= June 1921 =

Month of 1921

<<	June 1921					>>
Su	Mo	Tu	We	Th	Fr	Sa
			1	2	3	4
5	6	7	8	9	10	11
12	13	14	15	16	17	18
19	20	21	22	23	24	25
26	27	28	29	30

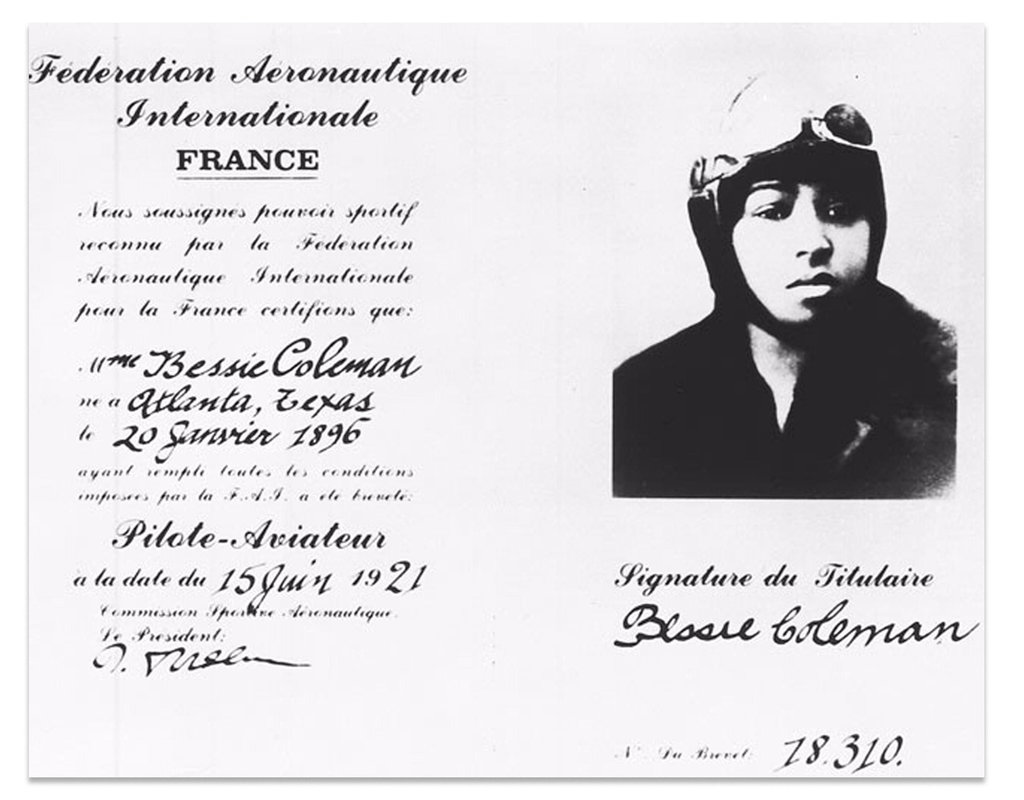
June 15, 1921: Bessie Coleman becomes first licensed black female pilot

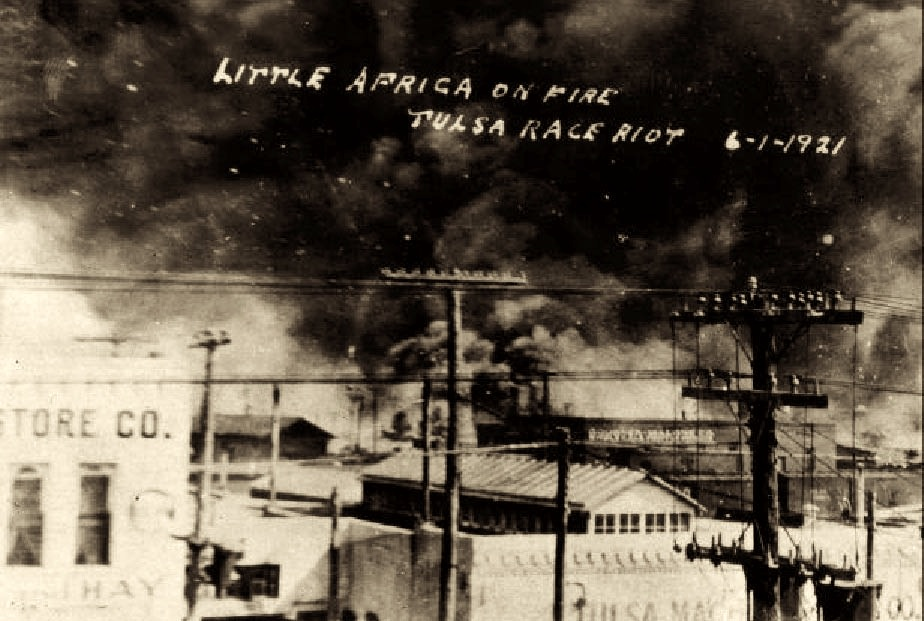
June 1, 1921: Greenwood, the African-American business and residential section of Tulsa, is burned down by white rioters; at least 21 black and nine white residents killed in rioting

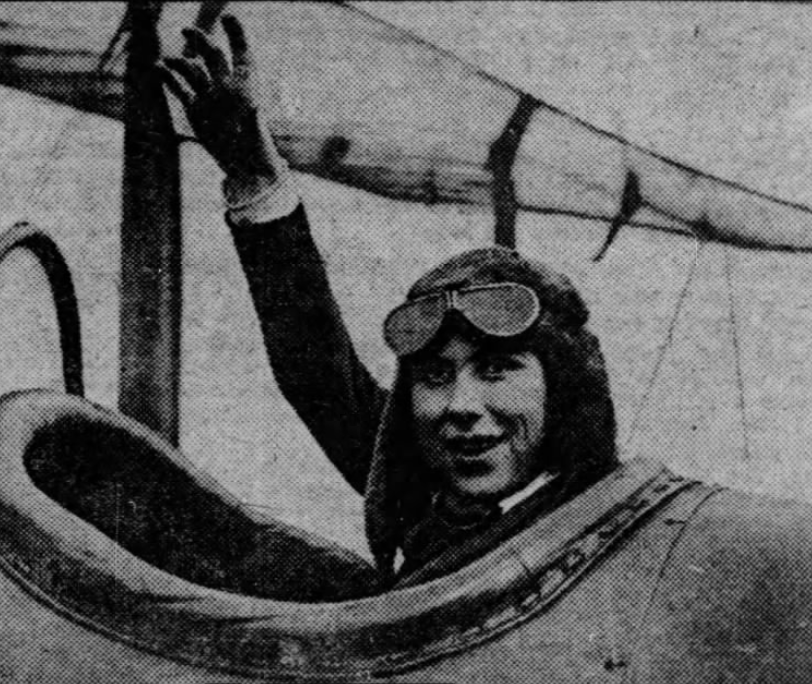
June 5, 1921: Laura Bromwell becomes first female stunt pilot to be killed in a crash

The following events occurred in June 1921:

== June 1, 1921 (Wednesday) ==
- The Greenwood massacre in the black section of Tulsa, Oklahoma was brought under control after 21 African Americans and nine Whites had been killed, and the city had been placed under martial law. Initial reports listed at least 55 black and 30 white deaths.
- The 1921 Canadian Census was taken and showed a total population of 8,788,483. It showed a 22 percent increase in the number of Canadians since 1911, with the provinces of Alberta and Saskatchewan having grown by more than 50 percent.
- Arturo Alessandri Palma, the President of Chile proposed to the Chilean Congress that a plebiscite be held in the disputed Tacna-Arica region, allowing voters to determine whether their region should remain part of Chile or become part of Peru.
- Born: Nelson Riddle, American musician and bandleader; in Oradell, New Jersey (d. 1985)
- Died: Yakov Lidski, 52-53, Warsaw-based Jewish bookseller and publisher (b. 1868)

== June 2, 1921 (Thursday) ==
- The International Olympic Committee voted to award the 1924 Summer Olympics to Paris, choosing the capital of France ahead of Amsterdam, Los Angeles, Prague and Rome.
- Eight members of a patrol of the Royal Irish Constabulary reserves were killed by the Irish Republican Army in the Carrowkennedy ambush near Westport, County Mayo as the RIC's two trucks and an auto were stopped in a rural area. The car had broken down while on its way back to Westport and was being towed by one of the trucks. After realizing that they were outnumbered, the 16 surviving RIC men surrendered to the IRA, which disarmed them and then released them.
- Died: Phebe Ann Hanaford, 92, American Universalist minister (b. 1829)

== June 3, 1921 (Friday) ==
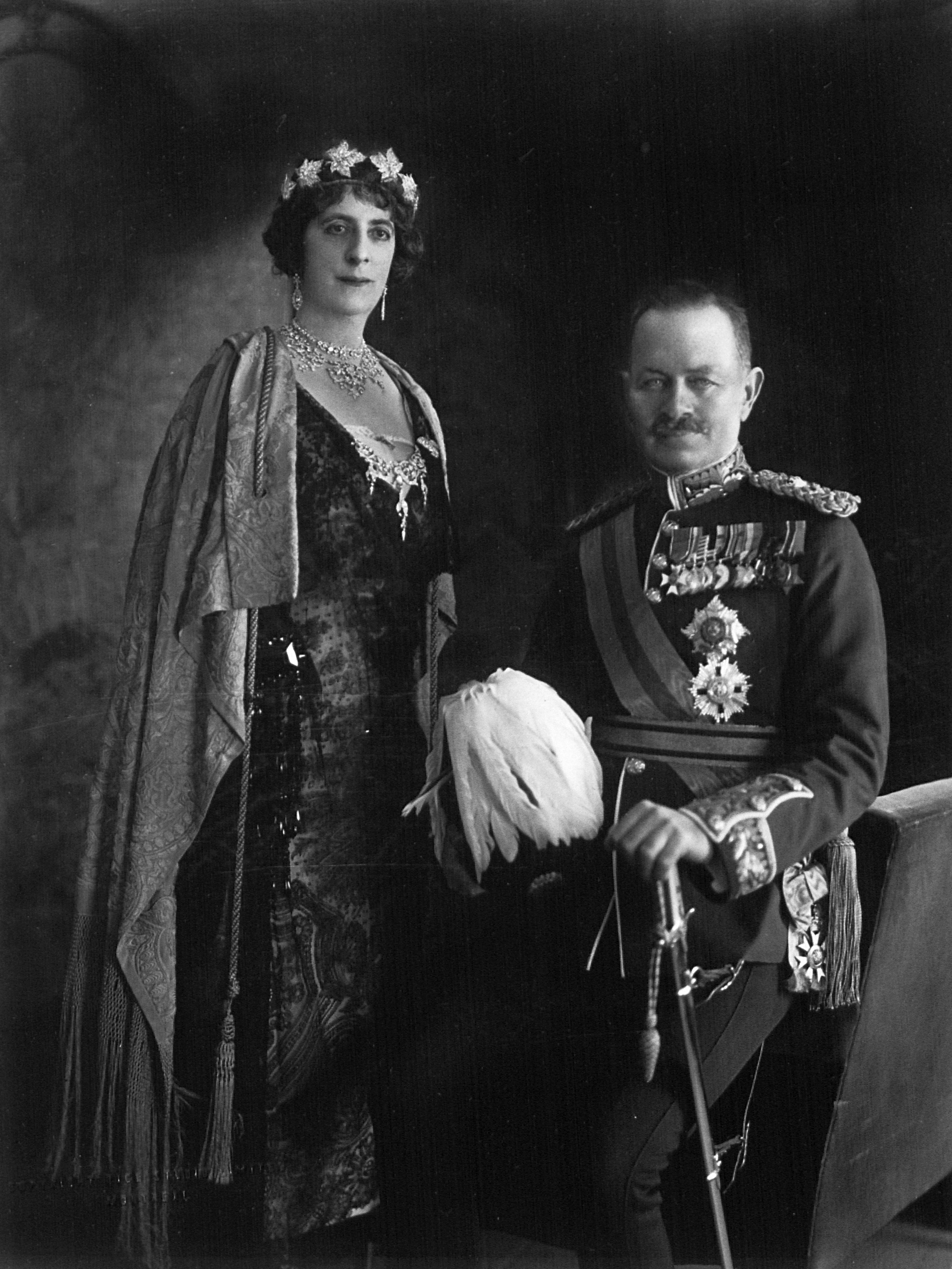
Lord Byng and wife

- Lord Byng was appointed as the new Governor General of Canada, succeeding the Duke of Devonshire.
- In Berlin, a German criminal court acquitted Soghomon Tehlirian of the charge of assassinating former Ottoman Grand Vizier Talaat Pasha on March 15.
- The Birthday Honours of King George V of the United Kingdom recognized, among others, Canadian manufacturer Douglas Alexander (baronet); Indian businessman and philanthropist Jehangir H. Kothari (knighted); and Scottish legal expert John Rankine (knighted).
- A British-operated artillery shell factory in Dublin, the only one in Ireland, was destroyed in an attack by Irish Republican forces.
- The 1921 Far Eastern Championship Games ended in Shanghai. China, Japan and the Philippines were the only competing countries.
- In the U.S., the Pueblo Flood in Pueblo, Colorado, began after torrential cloudbursts.
- Died: Simon Baruch, 80, American physician and advocate of hydrotherapy (b. 1840)

== June 4, 1921 (Saturday) ==
- At least 127 people were drowned and large sections of the U.S. city of Pueblo, Colorado were heavily damaged by the bursting of several dams after heavy rains flooded the Arkansas River and the Fountain River. The business section of Pueblo was covered by waters at least 5 feet (1.5 m) deep and as high as 18 feet (5.5 m) in low-lying areas. The initial death estimate was 500 people.
- Menshevik forces captured Omsk in Siberia from the Soviet Bolsheviks, while Japan prepared to transport other anti-Bolshevik forces to reinforce the Menshevik capture of Vladivostok.
- British Prime Minister David Lloyd George presented an offer to striking British miners for settlement, and set a deadline of June 18 for them to accept it.
- At the Leipzig War Crimes Trials, a German court acquitted Karl Neumann, the U-boat commander who had torpedoed and sunk the British hospital ship HMHS Dover Castle, accepting his defense that he was just following orders. As commander of SM UC-67, Neumann ordered the sinking of Dover Castle on May 26, 1917, although 302 of the 314 crew were rescued and there were no hospital patients on the ship at the time.
- The Allied Reparations Commission awarded 600,000 tons of confiscated German ships to the United States.
- Died:
  - Ludwig Knorr, 61, German chemist and co-developer of Aspirin (b. 1859)
  - Heinrich Albers-Schönberg, 56, German physician and radiologist, first to identify osteopetrosis; died of "cardiac failure consequent upon pneumonia." (b. 1865)

== June 5, 1921 (Sunday) ==
- A treaty was signed between Czechoslovakia and Romania, to combat possible Hungarian revisionism within the so-called "Little Entente."
- In New York City, an ordinance was passed to encourage the construction of new residences to accommodate 13,000 additional families by exempting them from city taxes for ten years if built in 1921 and 1922.
- Born: Thomas C. Peebles, American physician, first person to isolate the measles virus; in Newton, Massachusetts (d. 2010)
- Died:
  - Laura Bromwell, 24, American stunt pilot; killed after she lost control of her plane at the top of a loop over Long Island, New York, and crashed from an altitude of 1,000 feet (b. 1897)
  - Georges Feydeau, 58, French playwright (b. 1862)
  - Alexander Kellas, 52, Scottish mountaineer and chemist; died of a heart attack during the British expedition to Mount Everest (b. 1868)

== June 6, 1921 (Monday) ==
- The British government halted a five-month campaign of "reprisal burning" of the homes of Irish Republicans after the strategy had literally backfired. Tom Barry and his 3rd Cork Brigade had responded to the burning of Sinn Féin members' homes by burning down the much larger homes of Unionists, and as one observer would later note, "the huge homes of rich, politically influential Loyalists were worth far more than an Irish cottage." Years later, Barry would say of the British, "they had gone down in the mire to destroy us and down after them we had to go."
- Congolese religious leader Simon Kimbangu and his followers were arrested at Thysville (now Mbanza-Ngungu) by Belgian colonial authorities on the orders of administrator Léon Morel, but Kimbangu was able to escape and would remain a fugitive for three more months.
- Died: James A. Bradley, 91, American brush manufacturer and real estate developer, founder of the beach resorts of Bradley Beach, Ocean Grove, and Asbury Park, New Jersey (b. 1830)

== June 7, 1921 (Tuesday) ==
- The Parliament of Northern Ireland began operations in Belfast, with 40 of the 52 seats filled by the swearing in of Unionists. The remaining 12 seats remained empty as the Sinn Féin and the Irish nationalists who had won office refused to take the oath of loyalty to the crown.
- Allied troops in the disputed Upper Silesia region created a temporary buffer zone between the properties divided between Germany and Poland, with British troops and French troops enforcing the division.
- U.S. Secretary of State Charles Evans Hughes informed Mexican President Álvaro Obregón that the U.S. would not give diplomatic recognition until Mexico bound itself to the discharge of primary international obligations.
- U.S. President Warren G. Harding welcomed Panama's Foreign Minister, Marcisco Garay, to the White House to hear Panama's protests against the U.S. arbitrated settlement of the Panama and Costa Rica boundary.
- An assistance pact was signed between Romania and Yugoslavia.
- Patick Maher and Edmond Foley, the last of the "Forgotten Ten" Irish republicans, were executed in Mountjoy Prison, Dublin.
- In the Los Angeles mayoral election, incumbent Meredith P. Snyder was narrowly defeated by George E. Cryer.
- Died: Hans Christian Cornelius Mortensen, 64, Danish ornithologist and teacher (b. 1856)

== June 8, 1921 (Wednesday) ==
- U.S. Army Air Service test pilot Harold R. Harris became the first pilot to fly a pressurized aircraft, when he successfully took a Dayton-Wright USD-9A aloft with an experimental pressurized cockpit.
- The Highland Park Mosque, "the first building in the United States constructed by Muslims to use as a mosque consistent with the architectural traditions of that faith", was opened in the Detroit suburb of Highland Park, Michigan, at 242 Victor Street. It operated until 1926, when it was sold to the city of Highland Park by its builder, real estate developer and Syrian immigrant Mohammed Karob.
- President Alvaro Obregon of Mexico decreed a 25% increase on the export tax for Mexican petroleum, effective July 1.
- Babe Ruth of the New York Yankees, the highest-paid major league baseball player in the world, was placed in jail by a New York traffic court magistrate after being convicted of speeding and fined $100 after having driven 26 miles per hour (42 km/h) on a city highway. Placed in a cell at 11:30 in the morning, "The Home Run King" served five and a half hours and was released at 4:00 in the afternoon, forty minutes before he was scheduled to bat for the Yankees at the Polo Grounds.
- Born: Suharto, Indonesian military officer and politician, served as President of Indonesia from 1968 to 1998; in Kemusuk, Dutch East Indies (present-day Indonesia) (d. 2008)
- Died: Roderick Maclean, 66 or 67, Scotsman who attempted to assassinate Queen Victoria on March 2, 1882 (b. c. 1854)

== June 9, 1921 (Thursday) ==
- The British Government issued a White Paper publishing the text of a letter and text purporting to be a proposal for a treaty between Irish Republicans and the government of the Soviet Union. According to the release from the office of UK Prime Minister David Lloyd George, a June 15, 1920 letter was written by Dermot O'Hegarty to Desmond FitzGerald. The letter, said to have been captured in Dublin by British Army intelligence, attached a memorandum written by Patrick McCartan, stating that McCartan was working with American attorney John T. Ryan to negotiate with the Soviets.

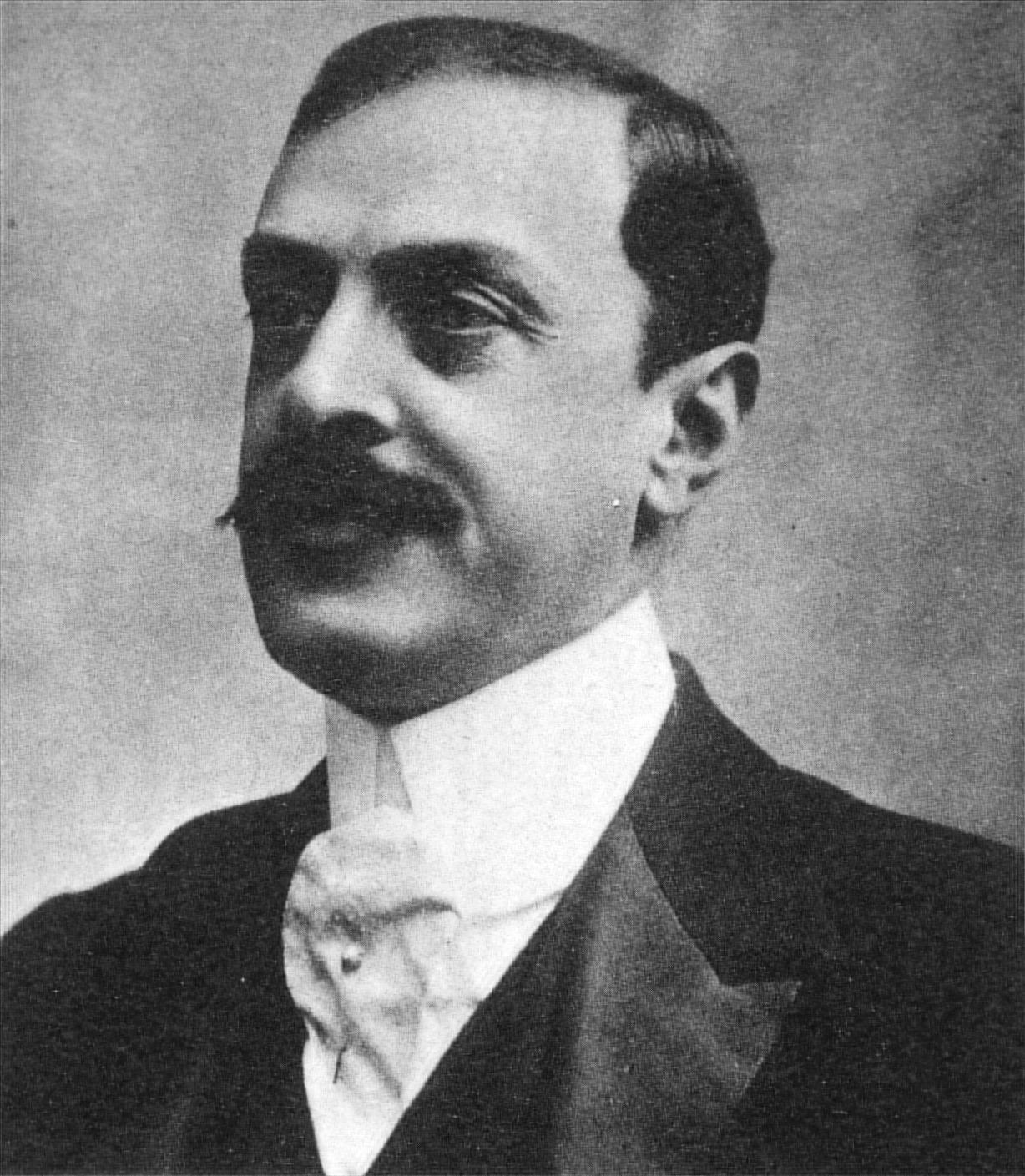
Minister Luis María Drago

- Died:
  - Luis María Drago, 62, Argentine politician and lawyer, served as Foreign Minister of Argentina, authored the Drago Doctrine in a diplomatic note in 1902 to U.S. President Theodore Roosevelt. During the Venezuelan crisis of 1902–1903, a blockade of Venezuela by European nations to collect debts owed, Drago proposed an addition to the Monroe Doctrine, that no foreign power should use force to collect a debt owed by a nation in the Western Hemisphere. As a result, the Roosevelt Corollary of 1904 asserted that foreign powers would be required to ask U.S. aid in resolving the debt rather than using military force (b. 1859)
  - Frederick W. Galbraith, 47, American World War I veteran, National Commander of the American Legion; killed in an auto accident in Indianapolis (b. 1874)
  - Louis de Rougemont, 73, Swiss hoaxster who claimed that he had lived among cannibals in Australia for 30 years (b. 1847)

== June 10, 1921 (Friday) ==
- The U.S. Office of Management and Budget (OMB) and the U.S. Government Accountability Office (GAO) were created as President Warren G. Harding signed the Budget and Accounting Act into law.
- The sinking of the Greek cargo ship Bouboulina killed 22 of the 30 crew after the vessel struck a naval mine in the Gulf of Smyrna off Uzunada, Turkey.
- Tristan Tzara's Le Cœur à gaz (The Gas Heart) was performed for the first time, during a Dada art exhibition at the Galerie Montaigne in Paris, France. It was later dubbed "the greatest three-act hoax of the century."
- D. H. Lawrence's controversial novel, Women in Love, was published in the UK for the first time. W. Charles Pilley, an early reviewer, wrote: "I do not claim to be a literary critic, but I know dirt when I smell it, and here was dirt in heaps—festering, putrid heaps which smell to high Heaven."

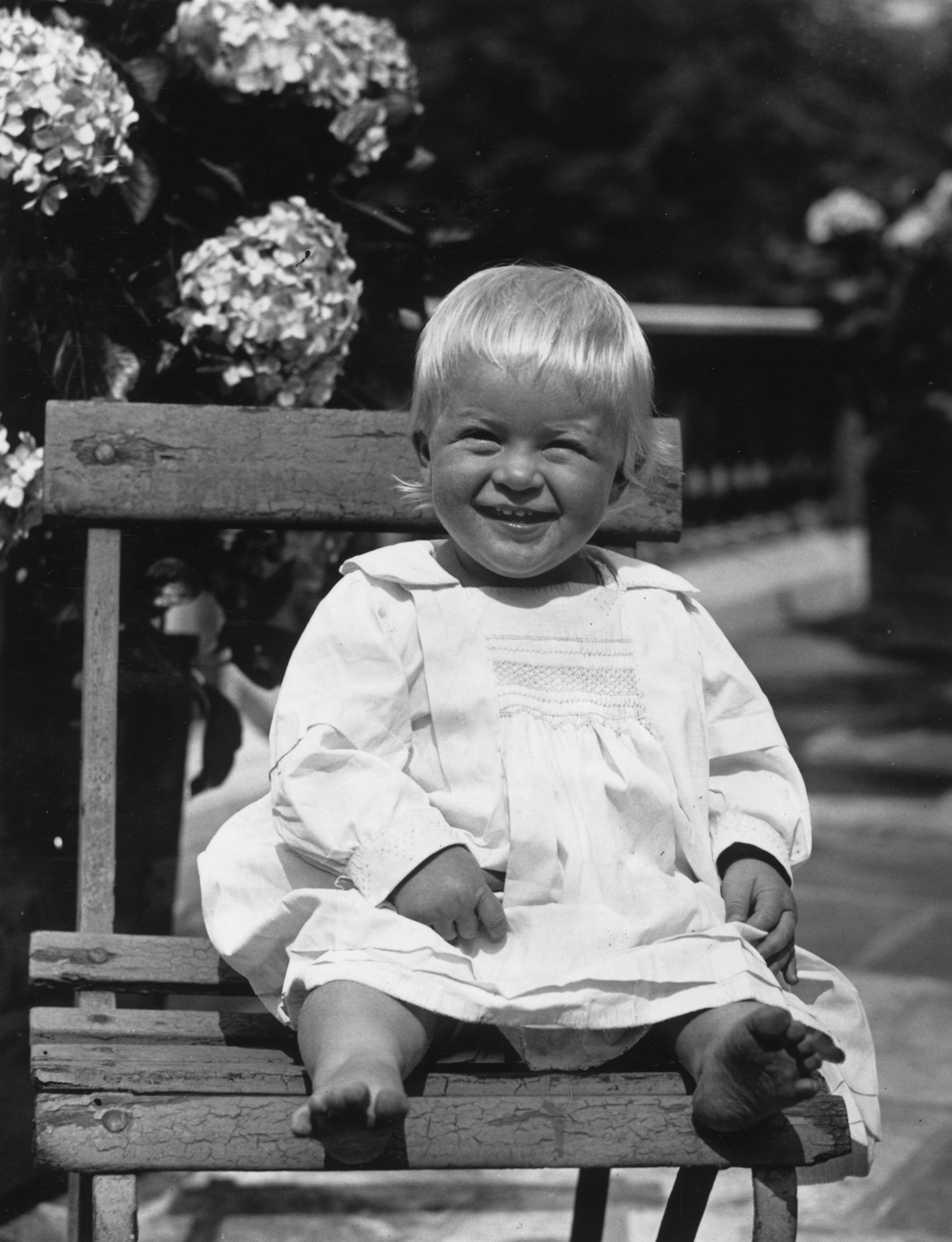
Prince Philip, Duke of Edinburgh as a toddler

- Born: Prince Philip, Duke of Edinburgh, consort of Queen Elizabeth II of the United Kingdom; as Prince Philip of Greece and Denmark, in Corfu, Kingdom of Greece (present-day Greece) (d. 2021)

== June 11, 1921 (Saturday) ==
- King Victor Emmanuel III of Italy opened the new session of the Italian parliament, and welcomed representatives from new territories that had been annexed in the 1920 peace settlement.
- King Constantine I of Greece departed from Athens to personally lead troops in the war against Turkey at the campaign to defend Smyrna (now İzmir).
- The collision of two trains in Spain near Villaverde killed at least 14 people when the southbound express passenger train from Madrid struck a northbound freight train from Toledo.
- Died: Ernesto Pastor, 29, Puerto Rican-born bullfighter; killed in Madrid after being gored by a bull (b. 1892)

== June 12, 1921 (Sunday) ==
- The Duchy of Luxembourg accepted protection by Belgium, after having been protected by Germany prior to the World War. Luxembourg consolidated its railways, abolished customs requirements, and adopted the Belgian franc as its currency.
- During the Greco-Turkish War, Greece's prime minister, Dimitrios Gounaris, traveled to İzmir by battleship.
- Completing its China famine relief program, the American Red Cross transferred ownership of 400 miles (640 km) of paved roads to the Chinese government. The transfer took place at Yucheng-Sang in the Shantung province.
- Born: Johan Witteveen, Dutch economist and politician, managing director of the International Monetary Fund (IMF) from 1973 to 1978; as Hendrikus Johannes Witteveen, in Zeist, Netherlands (d. 2019)

== June 13, 1921 (Monday) ==
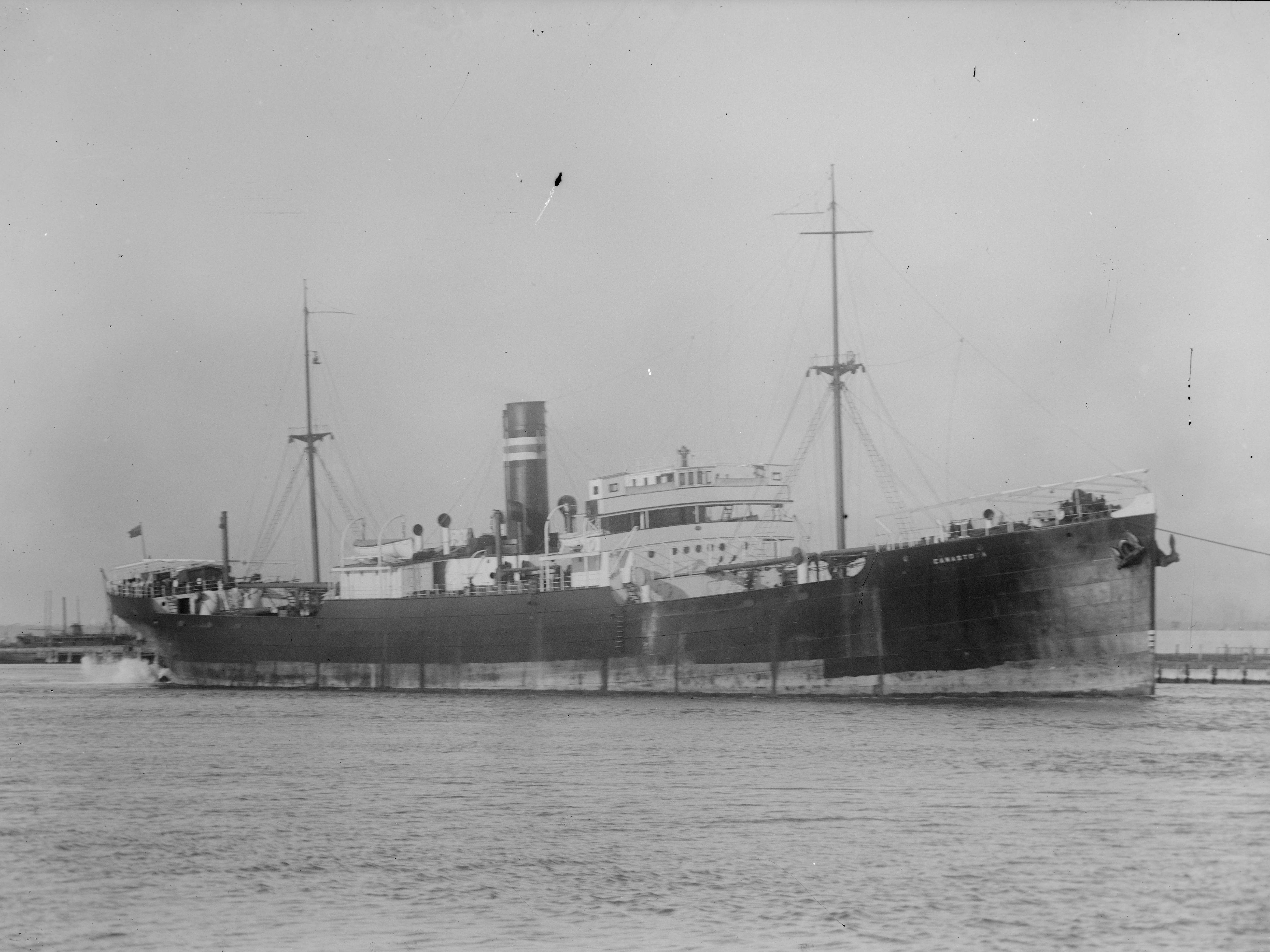
SS Canastota

- The British cargo ship SS Canastota left Sydney, Australia, bound for Wellington, New Zealand. It never arrived, and was presumed to have foundered in the Pacific Ocean with the loss of all 49 crew. Fire-damaged wreckage was eventually washed ashore.
- The U.S. House of Representatives passed the Knox–Porter Resolution, known as the "peace resolution" because it was a separate declaration of the end of America's state of war in World War I, 305 to 61.
- Died:
  - General José Miguel Gómez, 62, Cuban politician and revolutionary, served as President of Cuba from 1909 to 1913 (b. 1858)
  - Henry Clay Ide, 76, American judge and colonial commissioner, served as U.S. Governor-General of the Philippines from 1905 to 1906 (b. 1844)

== June 14, 1921 (Tuesday) ==
- The U.S. consul in Jamaica investigated charges laid by Marcus Garvey against the captain and chief engineer of Garvey's Black Star Line luxury yacht Kanawha, and exonerated them.
- Winston Churchill, the British Secretary of State for the Colonies, presented his plans to the House of Commons for creating an independent Arab state in Mesopotamia, which would become Iraq; and to maintain the Zionist state in Palestine, which would become Israel.
- In British Columbia, the legal sale of alcohol resumed after having been prohibited during Canada's participation in the World War. The provincial government sold permits, for 50 cents apiece, allowing the purchase of two quarts of liquor or twelve quarts of beer, and citizens were permitted to buy no more than 10 permits per year.
- Georgiana Simpson became the first African American woman to earn a Ph.D., receiving her doctorate in German literature for her dissertation Herder's Conception of "Das Volk" at the University of Chicago. The next day, Sadie Tanner Mossell became the second Black woman to receive a doctorate, a Ph.D. in economics from the University of Pennsylvania for The Standard of Living Among One Hundred Negro Migrant Families in Philadelphia.
- Born: Edward Gelsthorpe, American advertiser and marketing executive; in Philadelphia (d. 2009)

== June 15, 1921 (Wednesday) ==
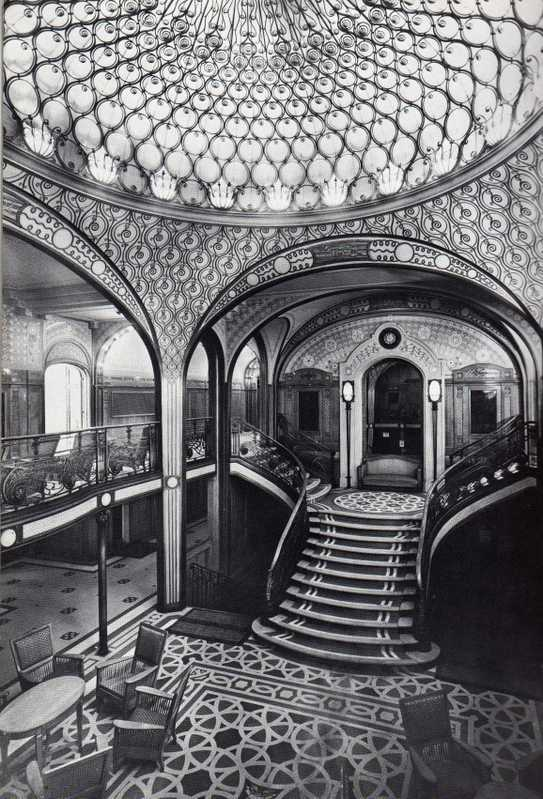
Inside the SS Paris

- The SS Paris, the biggest ocean liner of its time, began its maiden voyage, from Le Havre in France to New York City in the United States.
- Bessie Coleman became the first Black person to earn an international aviation license, and the first Black woman to earn any type of aviation pilot's license, when she was certified by the Fédération Aéronautique Internationale (FAI) of France. At the time, women of any race were not admitted into any certified U.S. schools that gave flying instruction.
- The U.S. Department of State announced that it would pursue negotiations with Japan to make final settlement of any points of dispute between the nations in the Pacific Ocean.
- U.S. federal agents raided the ship East Side while it was docked in New York Harbor, and found boxes of machine guns that were being sent to Ireland.
- Japan's Crown Prince Hirohito was welcomed by Queen Wilhelmina of the Netherlands after sailing from Britain.

== June 16, 1921 (Thursday) ==
- Members of the Miners' Federation of Great Britain refused to accept the government's proposed settlement of their strike, by a margin of 432,511 against and only 183,827 for.
- In the UK, the Hertford by-election, caused by the resignation of incumbent MP Noel Pemberton Billing on health grounds, was won by Murray Sueter for the Anti-Waste League.
- T. C. Glashen, a supporter of the Universal Negro Improvement Association and African Communities League (UNIA), was arrested in the United States for "inciting a riot" and was deported to Cuba.
- The Irish Republican Army carry out the Rathcoole ambush against a convoy of the Auxiliary Division in County Cork. In the ensuring attack the latter suffered 16 casualties.

== June 17, 1921 (Friday) ==
- The British House of Commons debated the Imperial Conference to be held in London, with the ministers of British Dominions present in a special gallery.
- Born: Gil Parrondo, Spanish Academy Award-winning movie set designer; in Luarca, Spain (d. 2016)

== June 18, 1921 (Saturday) ==
- Austria became the 38th nation to sign its agreement to be subject to the Permanent Court of International Justice.
- In Moultrie, Georgia, a lynch mob burned an African American murder convict at the stake immediately after he had been found guilty of the murder of a 12-year-old white girl. John Henry Williams had been sentenced to a July 8 hanging by the court in Colquitt County, Georgia, and was seized as he was being escorted out of the courtroom, then taken by the mob to the scene of the crime. According to a reporter at the scene, "Williams calmly smoked a cigarette as the match was applied to the fuel around him and he made but little outcry as the flames slowly burned him to death."
- Born:
  - Richard M. Bloch, American computer scientist, helped design and program the first digital computer, the Harvard Mark I, in 1944; in Rochester, New York (d. 2000)
  - Charles Atger, French glider pilot, has held the world record for longest glider flight time since 1952; in Gréoux-les-Bains, France (d. 2020)
- Died: Eduardo Acevedo Díaz, 70, Uruguayan writer and politician (b. 1851)

== June 19, 1921 (Sunday) ==
- The decennial census of Great Britain was taken, although Ireland was not enumerated because of the ongoing civil war. The total population of Great Britain was 42,919,700 including 37,886,699 in England and Wales, and 4,882,497 in Scotland.
- The United States Mint reported that it had resumed the minting of silver dollars for the first time since manufacture had ceased in 1914. During World War I, the U.S. had sold 279 million silver dollars to the United Kingdom.
- Born: Louis Jourdan, French stage, film and television actor; as Louis Robert Gendre, in Marseille, France (d. 2015)
- Died: Ramón López Velarde, 33, Mexican poet; died of pneumonia (b. 1888)

== June 20, 1921 (Monday) ==
- Representatives of the British Commonwealth nations met in London, as Prime Minister David Lloyd George welcomed prime ministers Billy Hughes of Australia, Arthur Meighen of Canada, William Massey of New Zealand and Jan Smuts of South Africa.
- El Salvador adopted a currency backed by gold after the Salvadoran Congress approved a 50-year agreement with an American bank for an exclusive concession in the Central American nation.
- The annual Wimbledon tennis championships opened in London, running until 2 July.

== June 21, 1921 (Tuesday) ==
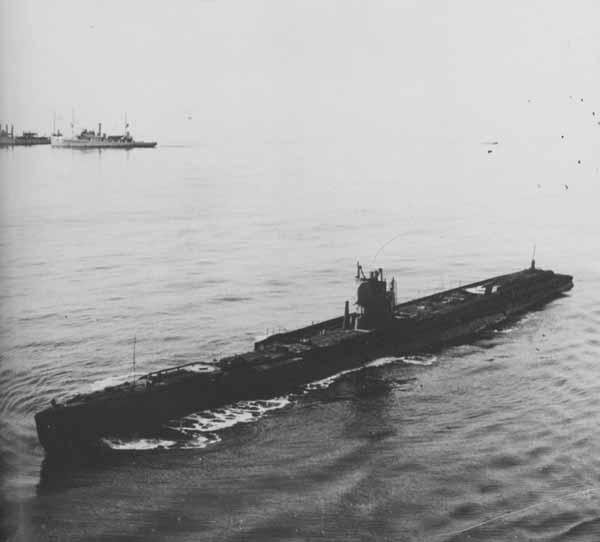
U-117 before the bombing

- The U.S. Navy and U.S. Army made a joint demonstration of American air power by dropping 12 bombs from an altitude of 1,100 feet (340 m) and sank the former German submarine U-117 within 16 minutes. The operation took place 75 miles (121 km) off of the coast of Norfolk, Virginia from Hampton Roads Naval Station, and was the first of several tests scheduled for the destruction of "former German vessels of every distinctive type." Three U.S. Navy F-5-L airplanes carried out the first wave of attacks that sank the U-117 and participation of the Army planes proved unnecessary.
- Michael Mayr resigned as Chancellor of Austria along with his cabinet, after slightly less than a year in office. He was replaced by Johannes Schober.
- The International Hydrographic Organization was established, as the International Hydrographic Bureau (IHB).
- Born:
  - Judy Holliday, American actress, comedian, and singer; as Judith Tuvim, in New York City (d. 1965)
  - Jane Russell, American actress, model, and singer; as Ernestine Jane Geraldine Russell, in Bemidji, Minnesota (d. 2011)

== June 22, 1921 (Wednesday) ==
- The new Parliament of Northern Ireland met at Belfast City Hall and was opened by King George V, with a speech calling for reconciliation in Ireland.
- Otto Blehr formed a cabinet as the new Prime Minister of Norway after the resignation of Otto Bahr Halvorsen.

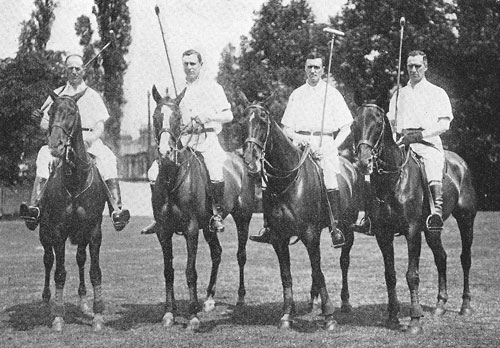
The 1921 U.S. Team

- In the match for the International Polo Cup at Hurlingham in England, the U.S. team defeated the British team, 10 to 6, bringing the Cup back to the United States.
- The U.S. Naval Academy eight-man rowing team won the Intercollegiate Rowing Association championship and shattered the record for rowing three miles. The record was lowered by 104 seconds, to 14 minutes, seven seconds, from 15:51.
- The Newbery Medal was created by the Association for Library Service to Children as the first annual award to be given to the author of "the most distinguished contribution to American literature for children." Hendrik Willem van Loon won the first Newbery Medal, for his book The Story of Mankind.
- The U.S. Senate passed the Army Appropriation bill and sent it to President Warren G. Harding, mandating the reduction of U.S. Army enlisted men by more than one-third from 220,000 to 150,000 by October 1. President Harding signed the bill into law on June 30.
- Died: General Charles H. Taylor, 74, American journalist, founder and editor of the Boston Globe (b. 1846)

== June 23, 1921 (Thursday) ==
- The U.S. Bureau of the Census announced the racial demographics of the United States, enumerating 94,822,431 whites, 10,463,013 African Americans, 242,959 American Indians, 111,025 Japanese and 61,686 Chinese.
- U.S. longshoremen's strike, which had started on May 1, ended after 53 days.
- Two women died immediately, and a third was fatally poisoned, hours after a dinner party the night before in Greensburg, Pennsylvania. Miss Ella Woodward, a maid at the home of Joseph D. Wentling died first, followed by Mrs. Wentling, despite the efforts of specialists called in from New York City and Pittsburgh. Mrs. J. Covode Reed, a guest at the Wentling party, died two days later. The deaths were all traced to botulism contamination in a single bottle of olives from a Pittsburgh farm.
- The Harvard Glee Club arrived in Paris and was received at the Hotel de Ville at the start of a European tour.
- Born: Rehman, Indian film actor; as Syed Rehman Khan, in Lahore, Punjab Province, British India (present-day Punjab Province in Pakistan) (d. 1984)

== June 24, 1921 (Friday) ==
- The Council of the League of Nations formally awarded Åland to Finland on condition that the islands not be used for military purposes and that Finland would protect Swedish citizens of the Alands.

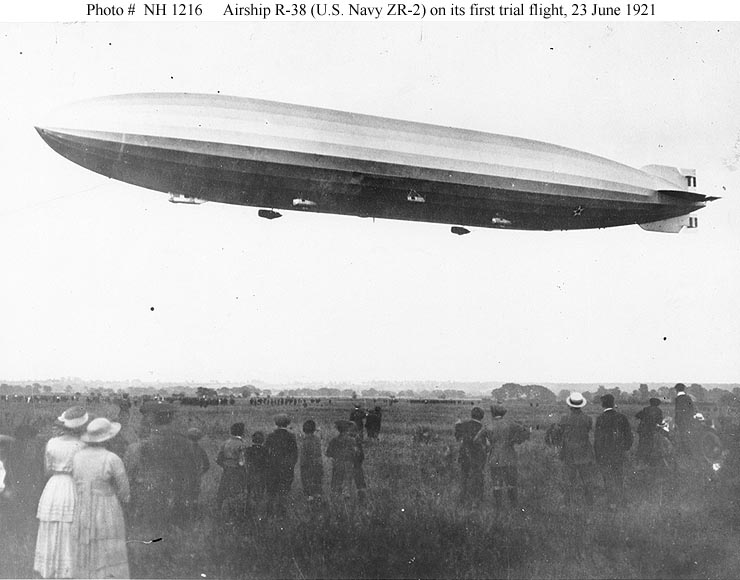
The R-38 Airship

- The first R38-class airship, the largest ever built by the British, completed its maiden voyage at Cardington, Bedfordshire. The R-38 had departed from Cardigan at 7:55 the night before with 48 people, including Royal Air Force Air Commodores Robert Brooke-Popham and Edward Maitland, and U.S. Navy Commander L. H. Maxfield who was preparing to captain the ship for its planned trans-Atlantic flight.
- The 1921 Women's Olympiad, the first international women's sports event, a multi-sport tournament organized by Alice Milliat, opened in Monte Carlo.

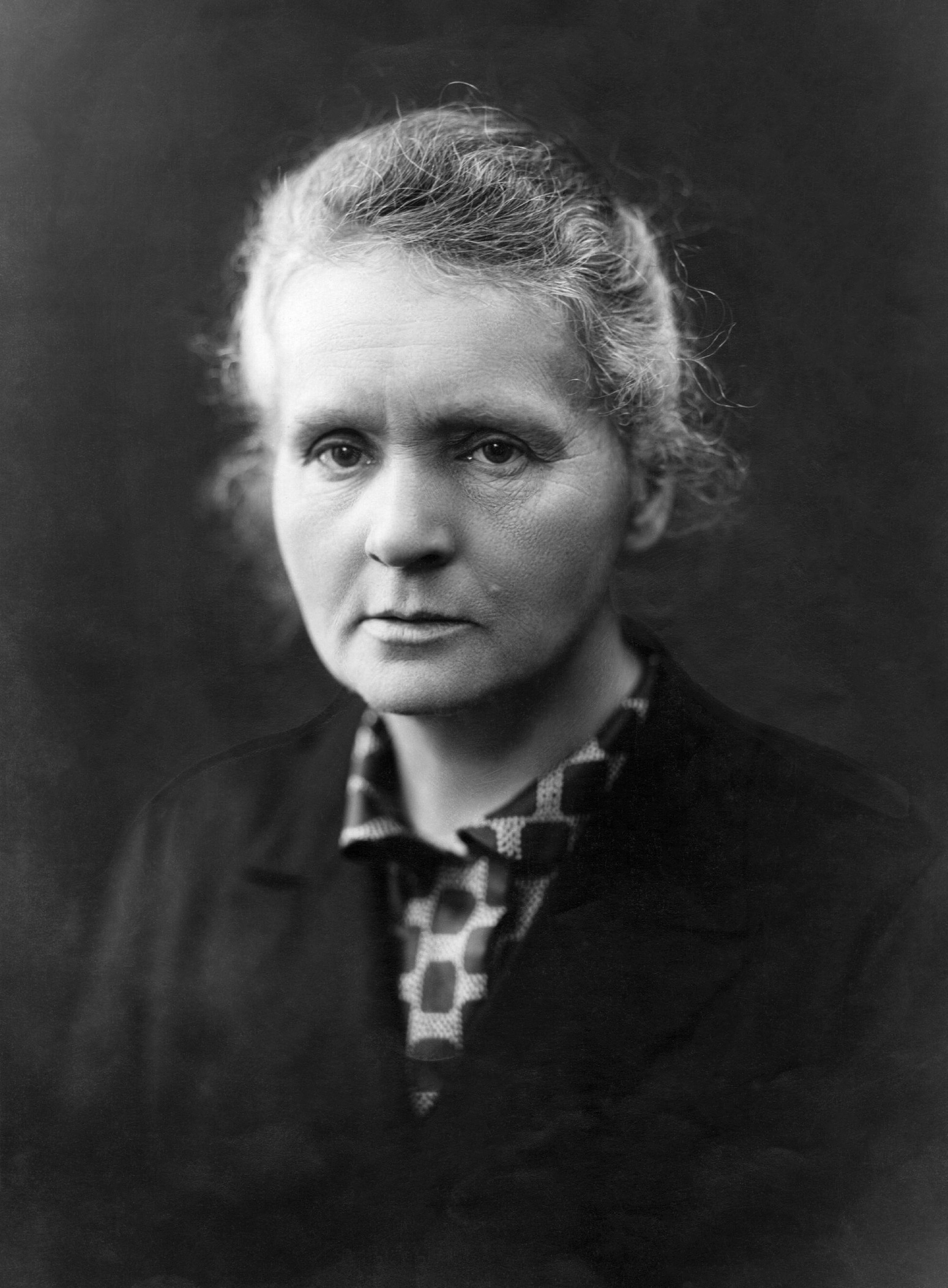
Marie Curie

- Marie Curie completed her visit to the United States and departed for France, after having been presented with a $100,000 sample of radium by U.S. President Harding.

== June 25, 1921 (Saturday) ==
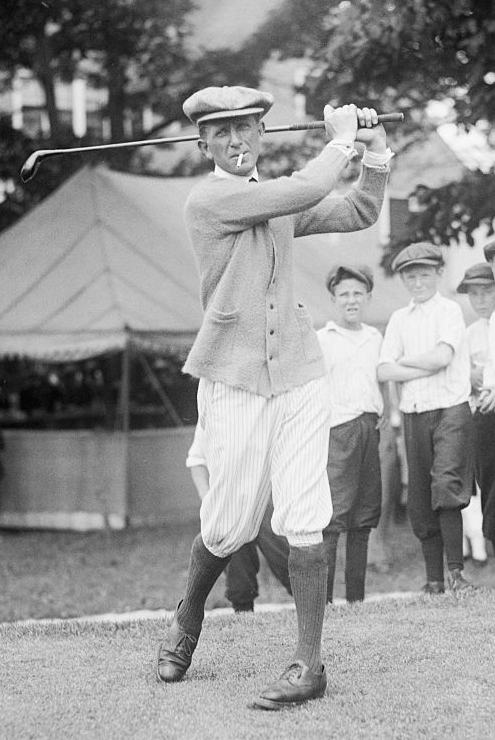
Jock Hutchison in 1921

- The British Open golf tournament was won by Scottish-born U.S. citizen Jock Hutchison, the first American to ever win the event. Hutchison had been born in St Andrews, near the site of The Open.
- British Prime Minister David Lloyd George sent an invitation to Irish nationalist Éamon de Valera (who had been named the tentative president of a "Republic of Ireland") and the premier of Northern Ireland, Sir James Craig, to meet in London to discuss peace. De Valera accepted the invitation the next day.
- Samuel Gompers was re-elected to a fortieth consecutive term as president of the American Federation of Labor, defeating United Mine Workers president John L. Lewis by a 2 to 1 margin (25,022 to 12,324).
- Oil was discovered in the Los Angeles metropolitan area when drilling at the Alamitos oil well reached a depth of 3,114 feet (949 m) near Signal Hill, California. The site is now at the corner of Temple Avenue and Hill Street in Signal Hill.
- Eleven people died in a single night near Mayfield, Kentucky in a murder-suicide carried out by a 35-year old farmer, Ernest Lawrence, against his own family and that of his sister-in-law. Investigators concluded that Lawrence shot or beat to death most of the victims— four adults and six children— then set fire to the house and shot himself. The bodies were so completely burned that all of the remains were placed in the same grave and in a single casket for interment.

== June 26, 1921 (Sunday) ==
- The Upper Silesian dispute between Germany and Poland was resolved by an agreement signed by General Charles Henniker-Major of Britain, and General Alberto de Marinis of Italy for the Allies defending Poland, and General Karl Höfer of Germany, where each side agreed to evacuate their armed forces from each other's nations.
- The 15th Tour de France cycle race opened in Paris.
- The capsizing of the Australian steamer Fitzroy in a gale killed 10 passengers and 21 crew. Only four people survived.
- Born:
  - Violette Szabo, French-born British Special Operations Executive (SOE) agent during World War II, posthumous recipient of the George Cross; as Violette Reine Elizabeth Bushell, in Paris (d. 1945, executed)
  - Ambroise Roux, French business magnate and presidential advisor; in Piscop, Val-d'Oise département (d. 1999)

== June 27, 1921 (Monday) ==
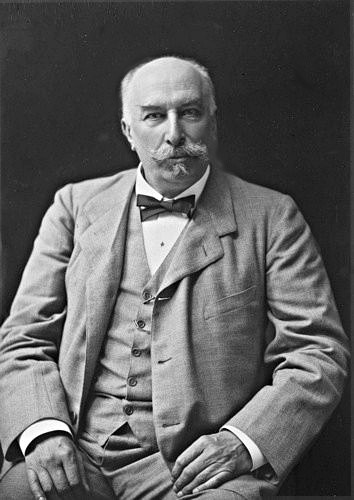
Italian Prime Minister Giovanni Giolitti

- Italy's Prime Minister, Giovanni Giolitti and his government resigned a day after only narrowly winning a confidence vote.
- Earl Granville informed the UK Foreign Secretary, Lord Curzon that Greece was about to launch a major offensive against Turkish troops commanded by İsmet İnönü in Anatolia.
- The initial signing of Treaty 11, between King George V of the United Kingdom and various First Nation band governments in the Northwest Territories of Canada, took place at Fort Providence.

== June 28, 1921 (Tuesday) ==
- The Vidovdan Constitution, so named because it was approved on the June 28 St. Vitus Day holiday, was adopted by a 223 to 35 vote of the Constitutional Assembly of the Kingdom of Serbs, Croats and Slovenes (later Yugoslavia).
- The United Kingdom's Air Navigation and Transport Act, which had been passed into law on December 2, 1920, to provide for the regulation of all air travel within the British Commonwealth, went into effect. It gave the British Empire authority over all air navigation in the British Commonwealth of Nations.
- The new Parliament of Southern Ireland met at the Royal College of Science for Ireland in Dublin and was opened by the Lord Lieutenant of Ireland, Viscount FitzAlan. In addition to the appointed Senate, only the four Unionist MPs representing Dublin University attended the House of Commons. Having elected Gerald Fitzgibbon to be Speaker, the House adjourned sine die because it lacked a quorum.
- The coal strike in the United Kingdom ended as the Miners' Federation of Great Britain dropped objections to accepting a cut in wages. The new agreement was designed to expire on September 30, 1922, if either labour or the government gave three months notice of intent to terminate. Formal approval was made by union members on July 1.
- Born: P. V. Narasimha Rao, Indian independence activist and statesman, served as Prime Minister of India from 1991 to 1996; as Pamulaparthi Venkata Narasimha Rao, in Narsampet, princely state of Hyderabad, British India (now the Telangana state iny India) (d. 2004)
- Died: Gyorche Petrov, 56, Bulgarian revolutionary; assassinated by members of his own Internal Macedonian Revolutionary Organization (b. 1865)

== June 29, 1921 (Wednesday) ==
- The German paramilitary group Einwohnerwehr (Citizens' Defense) was disbanded by the German government on the demands of the Allied Council.
- Greek forces evacuated Izmit in Turkey, leaving it to be retaken by Turkish Nationalists to travel to Istanbul.
- Died: Jennie Spencer-Churchill, 67, U.S.-born British socialite and mother of Winston Churchill, died of complications resulting from a fall (b. 1854)

== June 30, 1921 (Thursday) ==
- General Electric (GE), Radio Corporation of America (RCA), and American Telephone & Telegraph (AT&T) entered into an agreement with Westinghouse Electric Company to combine their research in radio broadcasting into a common technology rather than creating rival systems.
- William Howard Taft, the former President of the United States from 1909 to 1913, was nominated by U.S. President Harding to be the new Chief Justice of the United States, and was confirmed the same day by the U.S. Senate.
- Britain released multiple Irish republicans of Sinn Féin from prison in Dublin, including Arthur Griffith and Professor John MacNeill.
- The South African Reserve Bank, the central bank for South Africa, began operations at its headquarters in Pretoria.
- Sweden's death penalty was abolished as legislation passed by the Riksdag on May 7 took effect.
- The North Melbourne Football Club, an Australian rules football team, disbanded in an attempt to obtain entry to the Victorian Football League. The attempt was foiled by a legal challenge. The club subsequently merged with the Essendon Association Club.
