= Kent Kane Parrot =

American politician (1880–1956)

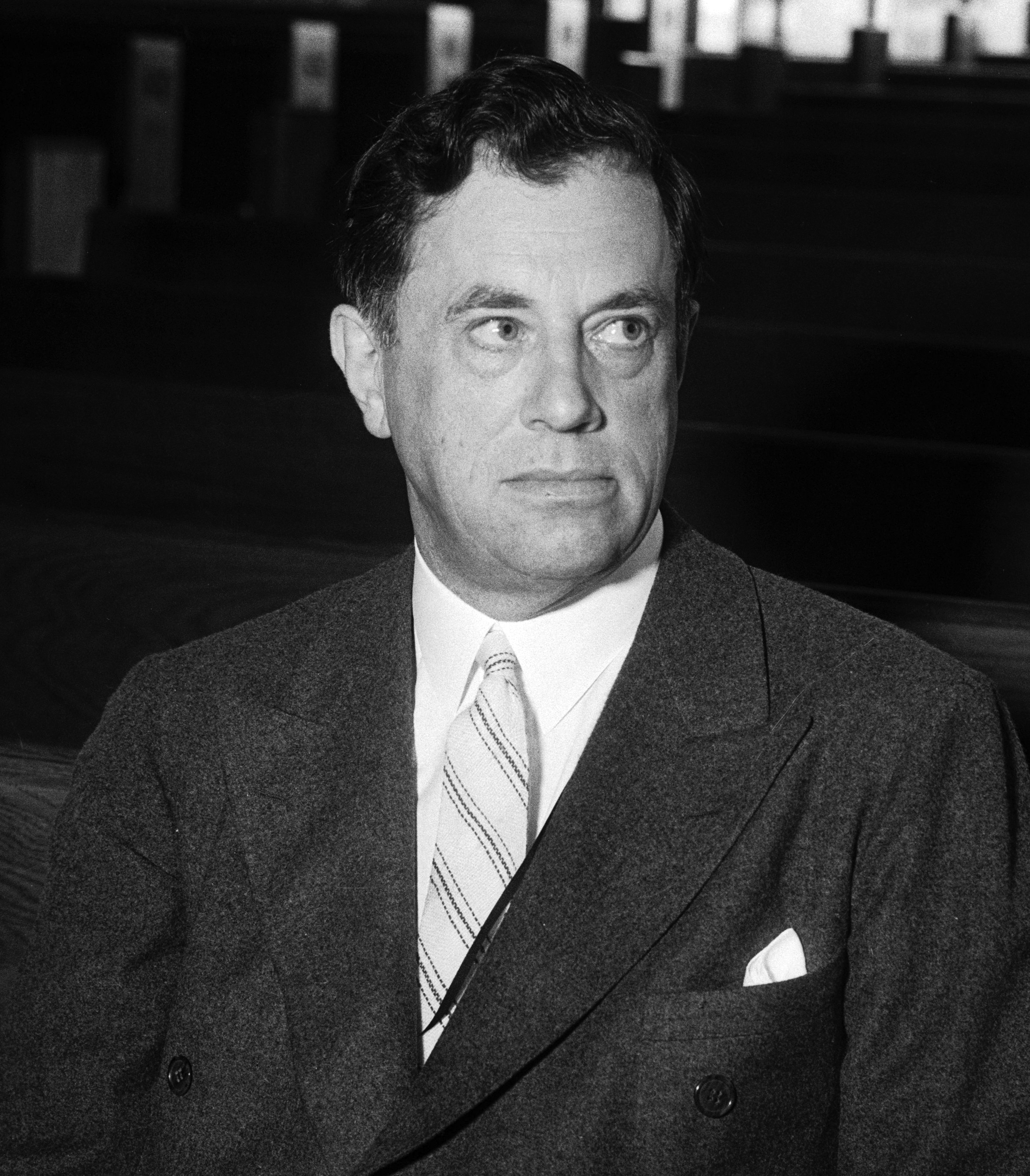
- Parrot in 1930s
- Born: May 22, 1880; Kennebunkport, Maine
- Died: March 11, 1956 (aged 75); Montecito, California
- Political party: Republican

Kent Kane Parrot (May 22, 1880 – March 11, 1956) was an American political figure and attorney who was considered the "boss" of municipal politics in Los Angeles, California, in the 1920s.

== Early years ==
Kane was a native of Kennebunkport, Maine, the son of a wealthy family. In 1905, he married his third cousin, Mary O'Hara. They had a son, Kent Kane Parrot Jr., and a daughter who died of cancer in childhood. Following the end of their marriage, O'Hara worked as a Hollywood screenwriter; her most noted work was My Friend Flicka.

Parrot moved with O'Hara to Los Angeles in 1907, where Parrot attended USC Law School. He was reported to have been a star football player while a student at USC. Parrot received his law degree in 1909 and was admitted to the bar, but he found his talent as a deal-maker with tremendous people skills. He was described as a big man, approximately 6 feet 2 inches (188 cm), with a "magnetic personality".

== George Cryer ==
Parrot became active in local politics, and in 1921 he teamed up with George E. Cryer, an assistant district attorney who had prosecuted public corruption cases. Parrot saw Cryer as a good choice for a mayoral candidate and suggested to Cryer that he run, with Parrot as his campaign manager. In 1921, the Cryer-Parrot team defeated the incumbent Mayor Meredith P. Snyder. Cryer's campaign promised to close the "dens of vice" and attacked Snyder as being corrupt and unfit to be mayor. The Los Angeles Police Commissioner sent a telegram to the newspapers before the election asking, "Shall crime and protected vice continue, or will the voters and taxpayers elect George E. Cryer mayor?"

== "De facto mayor" ==
Though Cryer had been elected to office as a reformer who would eliminate public corruption, Cryer's administration became the target of corruption charges. During Cryer's eight years as mayor from 1921 to 1929, Parrot became known for his wielding of power behind the scenes. Shortly after his election, Cryer appointed Parrot to the Board of Public Service Commission, but the City Council rejected the appointment by a 7 to 2 vote. Instead, Parrot remained in the background.

It was widely written that Cryer was a figurehead and that Parrot was the "de facto mayor" who ran the Harbor Commission and the Los Angeles Police Department, even transferring personnel without consulting the city's police chief. Cryer was sometimes referred to as "Parrot's Puppet", and the city government in the 1920s was said to be controlled by the "Parrot-Cryer machine". From his position of influence in city government, Parrot became associated with the city's vice king, Charles H. Crawford, and bootleggers Tony Cornero and Albert Marco. Though discreet in public, Parrot reportedly socialized with the city's criminal leaders at his private apartment at the city's newest opulent hotel, the Biltmore.

Cryer's opponent in the 1925 mayoral election, Benjamin F. Bledsoe, focused attention on Parrot's role in city government: "I ask, as I shall continue to ask through this campaign: 'Mr. Cryer, how much longer is Kent Parrot going to be the de-facto Mayor of Los Angeles'?" The Los Angeles Times in April 1925 ran a front-page editorial under the headline, "SHALL WE RE-ELECT KENT PARROT?" The editorial said of Parrot:

A condition exists in the municipal government of Los Angeles that has existed in other great cities in times past -- boss control. ... Although Mayor Cryer's name appears alone on the primary election ballot, the result is no less vital to Mr. Parrot than to Mr. Cryer. Elect Mr. Cryer and elect Mr. Parrot; defeat Mr. Cryer and eliminate Mr. Parrot. The Mayor of Los Angeles, who should be free from domination by any individual or interest, is cloaked with official authority that does not require the additional support of a political fixer. There should be no one attached to the office of Mayor whose peculiar genius runs to the business of controlling patronage, of fixing cases in police court, of interfering with police activities, of ordering the affairs of the gambler, the bootlegger, the bookmaker and other breakers of the law. Los Angeles does not need a boss.

Nevertheless, Cryer was reelected in the May primary by 82,188 votes to 67,722 for Bledsoe, the next finisher.

By 1927, the Los Angeles Times was increasingly critical of the relationship between Parrot and Cryer, referring to Cryer as Parrot's "personal mayor". Though the Times had been a strong backer of Cryer, the paper in 1927 published an editorial referring to the city government as "Our Local Tammany", with Parrot in the role of Boss Tweed. The article focused its attack on the "clumsy" corruption of the political machine run by "Boss Parrot":

Evidently Boss Parrot's subordinates are not well trained. Give him a few more years in control and he will, perhaps, do better. He must learn to think up plausible reasons for the actions of the organization and not let the purely political motive stick out like a sore thumb. Perhaps he thinks the voters of Los Angeles are so lacking in intelligence that this is unnecessary; if so, he is mistaken. It does not pay to be so raw anywhere.

A campaign to recall Cryer in 1927 was led by the City Planning Commissioner, Estelle Holman, and rumors spread that Cryer was "tired" and "weary" of the job, and that an "Unknown Committee of Twenty-Five" had formed to tell "the Parrot-Cryer lame-duck city 'administration' to ease the Mayor out of the side door of City Hall."

== Break with Cryer ==
By 1929, relations between the two principals of "the so-called Parrot-Cryer political machine" had been severed. Parrot leaked a report to the Los Angeles Record that Cryer would not seek re-election, and those close to Cryer openly charged Parrot with betraying the mayor. Cryer himself announced in late February 1929 that he would not run for re-election as mayor.

== Later years ==
After Cryer left office in 1929, Parrot abandoned politics and moved to Montecito, California. He was divorced by his second wife, Virginia Pierce Parrot, in 1929 and married Lucille Cary Armstrong in 1936. He remained in Montecito until he died of cancer in 1956 at age 73.
