= 1917 Los Angeles mayoral election =

- May 1, 1917
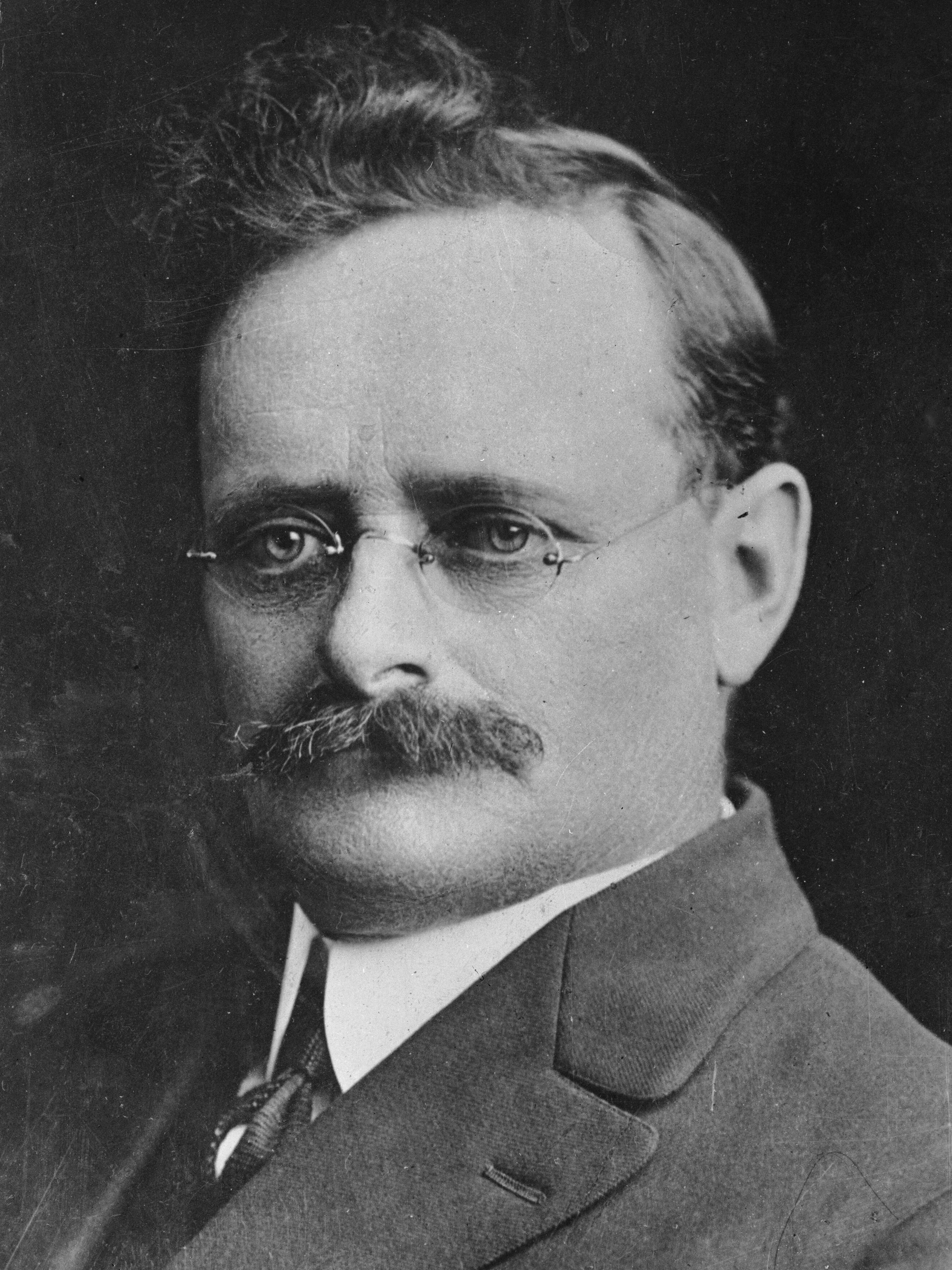

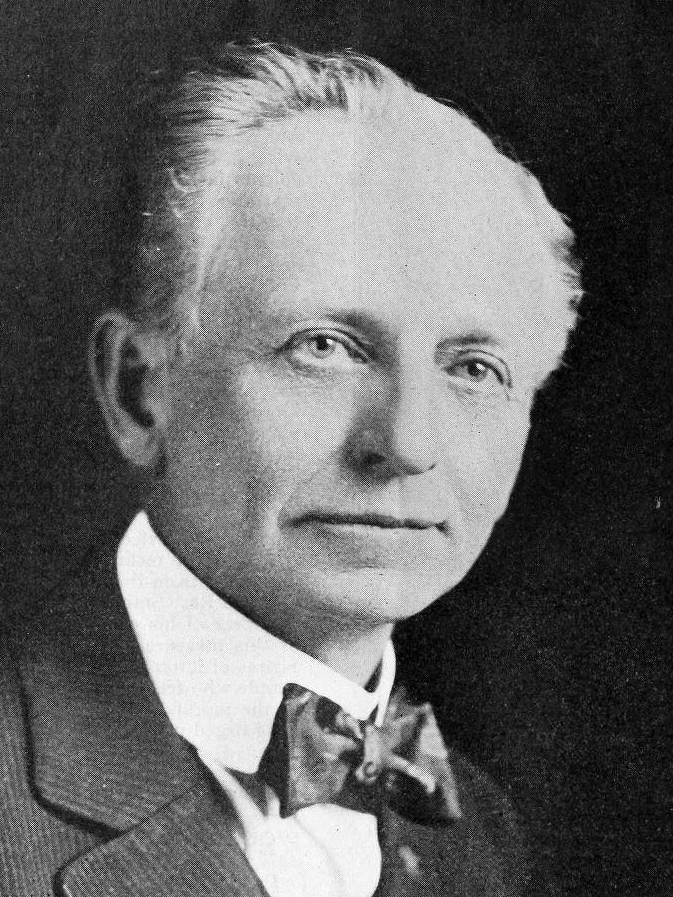
Candidate	Frederic T. Woodman	Meredith P. Snyder
Popular vote	39,445	34,486
Percentage	50.67%	44.30%
Mayor before election
Frederic T. Woodman
Elected Mayor
Frederic T. Woodman

The 1917 Los Angeles mayoral election took place on May 1, 1917. Incumbent Frederic T. Woodman, who was appointed after the resignation of Charles E. Sebastian, was re-elected over former Mayor Meredith P. Snyder.

Municipal elections in California, including Mayor of Los Angeles, are officially nonpartisan; candidates' party affiliations do not appear on the ballot.

== Election ==
The previous mayor, Charles E. Sebastian, resigned on September 2, 1916, due to newspapers publishing letters between him and Lillian Pratt showing infidelity. After three days, the Los Angeles City Council named Frederic T. Woodman as the new mayor, with the term going well for Woodman. In the election, Woodman faced former Mayor Meredith P. Snyder, who previously led the city from 1900 to 1904. Sebastian also ran in the election to try and get his old job back, as well as Henry H. Roser (no relation to previous Mayor Henry H. Rose). In the election, Woodman won outright, preventing the need for a runoff.

== Results ==
Los Angeles mayoral general election, May 1, 1917
Candidate	Votes	%
Frederic T. Woodman (incumbent)	39,445	50.67
Meredith P. Snyder	34,486	44.30
Henry H. Roser	3,091	3.97
Charles E. Sebastian	825	1.06
Total votes	77,847	100.00
