= 1919 Los Angeles mayoral election =

- May 6, 1919 and June 3, 1919
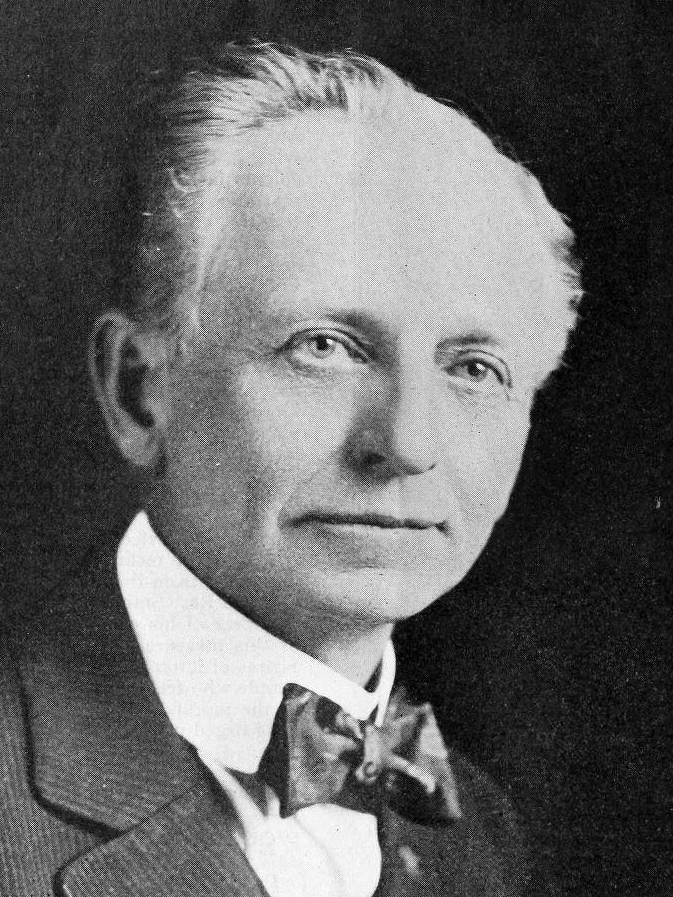

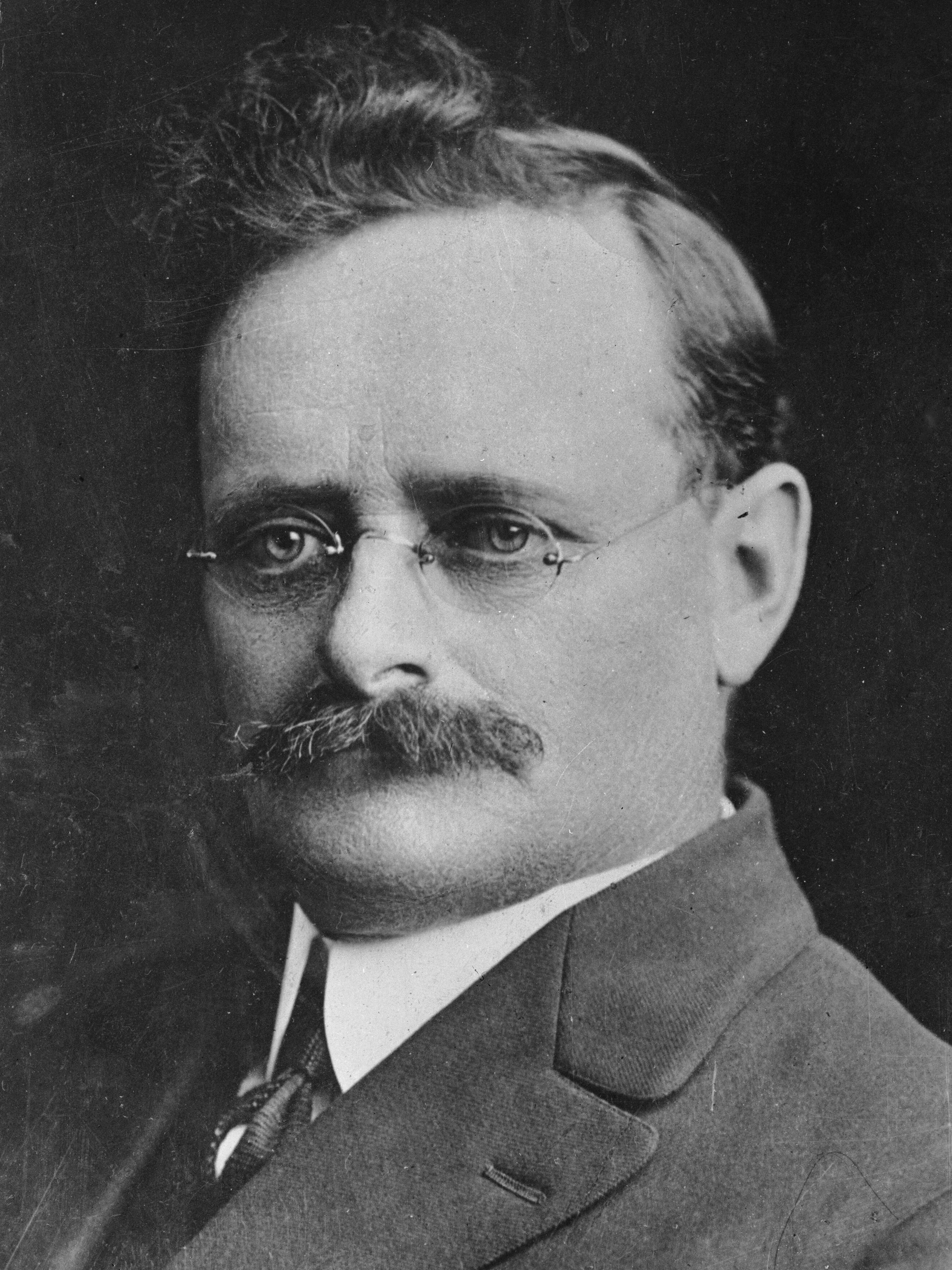

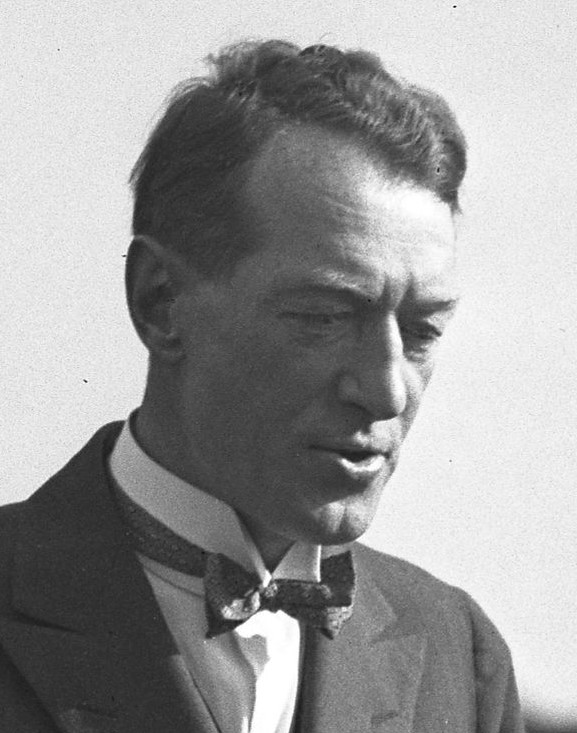

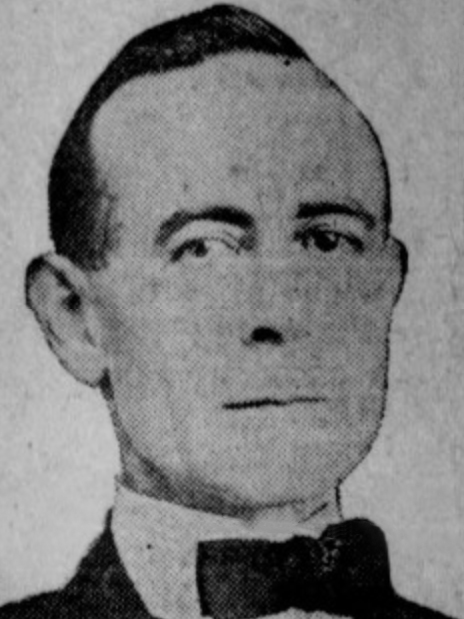
Candidate	Meredith P. Snyder	Frederic T. Woodman
First round	23,368; 37.28%	19,504; 31.12%
Runoff	26,779; 63.22%	15,578; 36.78%
Candidate	Sylvester Weaver	Gesner Williams
First round	13,864; 22.12%	4,316; 6.89%
Runoff	Eliminated	Eliminated
Mayor before election
Frederic T. Woodman
Elected Mayor
Meredith P. Snyder

The 1919 Los Angeles mayoral election took place on May 6, 1919, with a run-off election on June 3, 1919. Incumbent Frederic T. Woodman was defeated by Meredith P. Snyder. Snyder, the mayor of Los Angeles from 1896–98 and 1900–04, was elected to a third non-consecutive term.

Municipal elections in California, including Mayor of Los Angeles, are officially nonpartisan; candidates' party affiliations do not appear on the ballot.

== Election ==
After his election to a full term in 1917, incumbent Frederic T. Woodman was seeking another term in office. He faced Meredith P. Snyder, his opponent in the previous election. In March 1919, Woodman was indicted on charges of asking and receiving a bribe, and during his campaign for the election, he was arrested and tried but was later acquitted of all charges. Two months later, Woodman lost the election to Snyder.

== Results ==
=== Primary election ===
Los Angeles mayoral primary election, May 6, 1919
Candidate	Votes	%
Meredith P. Snyder	23,368	37.28
Frederic T. Woodman (incumbent)	19,504	31.12
Sylvester Weaver	13,864	22.12
Gesner Williams	4,316	6.89
Irene Smith	1,516	2.42
Henry E. Small	116	0.19
Total votes	62,684	100.00

=== General election ===
Los Angeles mayoral general election, June 3, 1919
Candidate	Votes	%
Meredith P. Snyder	26,779	63.22
Frederic T. Woodman (incumbent)	15,578	36.78
Total votes	42,357	100.00
