= Frederic T. Woodman =

American politician (1872–1949)

Frederic Thomas Woodman
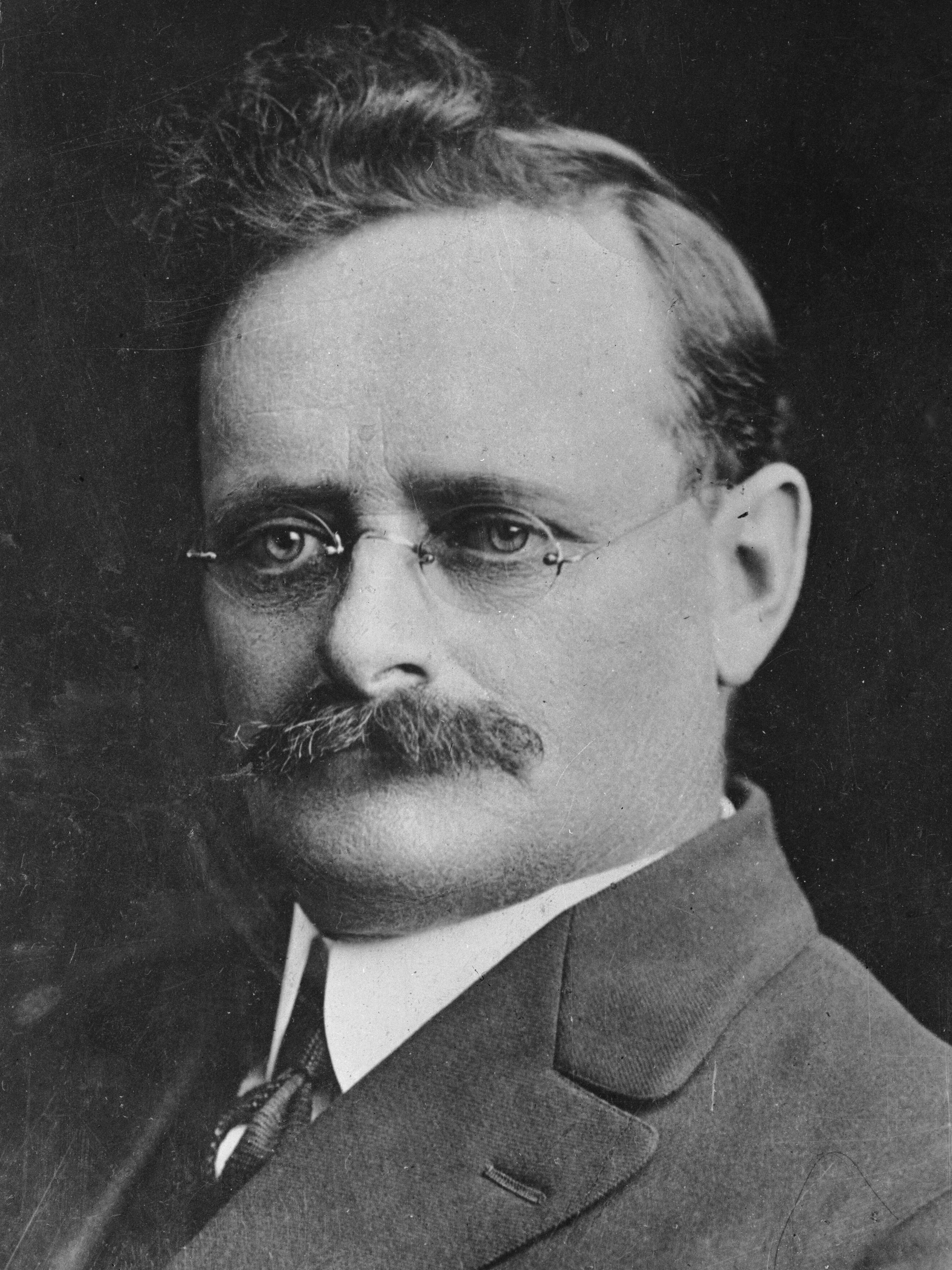
- Portrait c. 1910s

31st Mayor of Los Angeles
- In office September 5, 1916 – July 1, 1919
- Preceded by: Charles E. Sebastian
- Succeeded by: Meredith P. Snyder

Member of the New Hampshire House of Representatives
- In office 1901–1903

Personal details
- Born: June 28, 1872 Plainfield, New Hampshire, U.S.
- Died: March 25, 1949 (aged 76) Los Angeles, California, U.S.
- Party: Republican
- Spouses: Etta M. Sanborn (m. 1908; died 1916) Katherine Potter Winter (m. 1921)

Frederic Thomas Woodman (June 28, 1872 – March 25, 1949) was an American politician who served as the 31st Mayor of Los Angeles from September 5, 1916 to July 1, 1919. Previously serving in the New Hampshire House of Representatives, he moved to Los Angeles in 1908 and was appointed Mayor in September 5, 1916 after the resignation of incumbent Charles E. Sebastian.

== Personal life and early career ==
Woodman was Plainfield, New Hampshire on June 28, 1872 to Alfred Woodman and Maria Thomas Gallup Woodman. His sister was Kathryn Woodman Leighton, who became an artist in Los Angeles. He attended public school in White River Junction, Vermont and went to study law in Lebanon, New Hampshire. He was later admitted to the bar in 1897 and started practice in Concord, New Hampshire. In 1901, he was elected to the New Hampshire House of Representatives where he served for two years. He youngest chair of a committee and was encouraged to run for the New Hampshire Senate, but declined to do so.

He married twice, first to Etta M. Sanborn in 1908 who died in 1916 and then to Katherine Potter Winter in 1921. He died in Los Angeles on March 25, 1949.

=== Mayor of Los Angeles ===
In 1907, he left New Hampshire to move to Los Angeles and made investments within the city, establishing himself in practice. By 1902, he was appointed as a member of the Los Angeles Harbor Commission and was elected as its president at their first meeting. He was a member until 1916. As a member, he helped with harbor improvement and recovered all the tide lands at the harbor. In 1916, he was appointed as Mayor of Los Angeles after the resignation of Charles E. Sebastian. The next year, he was elected to a full term against former Mayor Meredith P. Snyder.

In March 1919, Woodman was indicted on charges of asking and receiving a bribe, and during his campaign for the 1919 election, he was arrested and tried but was later acquitted of all charges. Two months later, Woodman lost the election to Snyder. After retiring, he returned to law and became the president of the Woodman-Gray Company and the Vista Irrigation District. He contemplated running in the 1921 Los Angeles mayoral election, but decided not to.
