= 1925 Los Angeles mayoral election =

- May 5, 1925
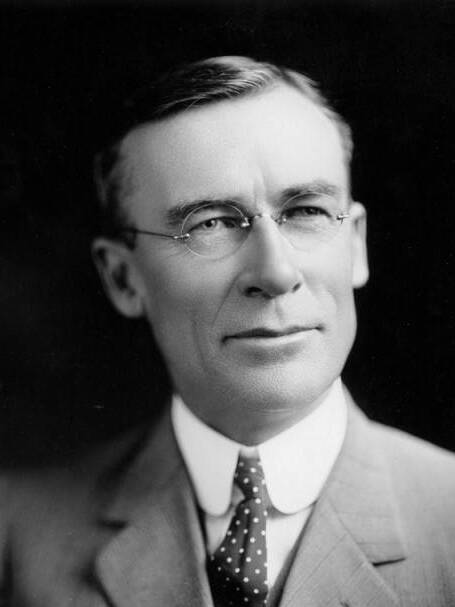

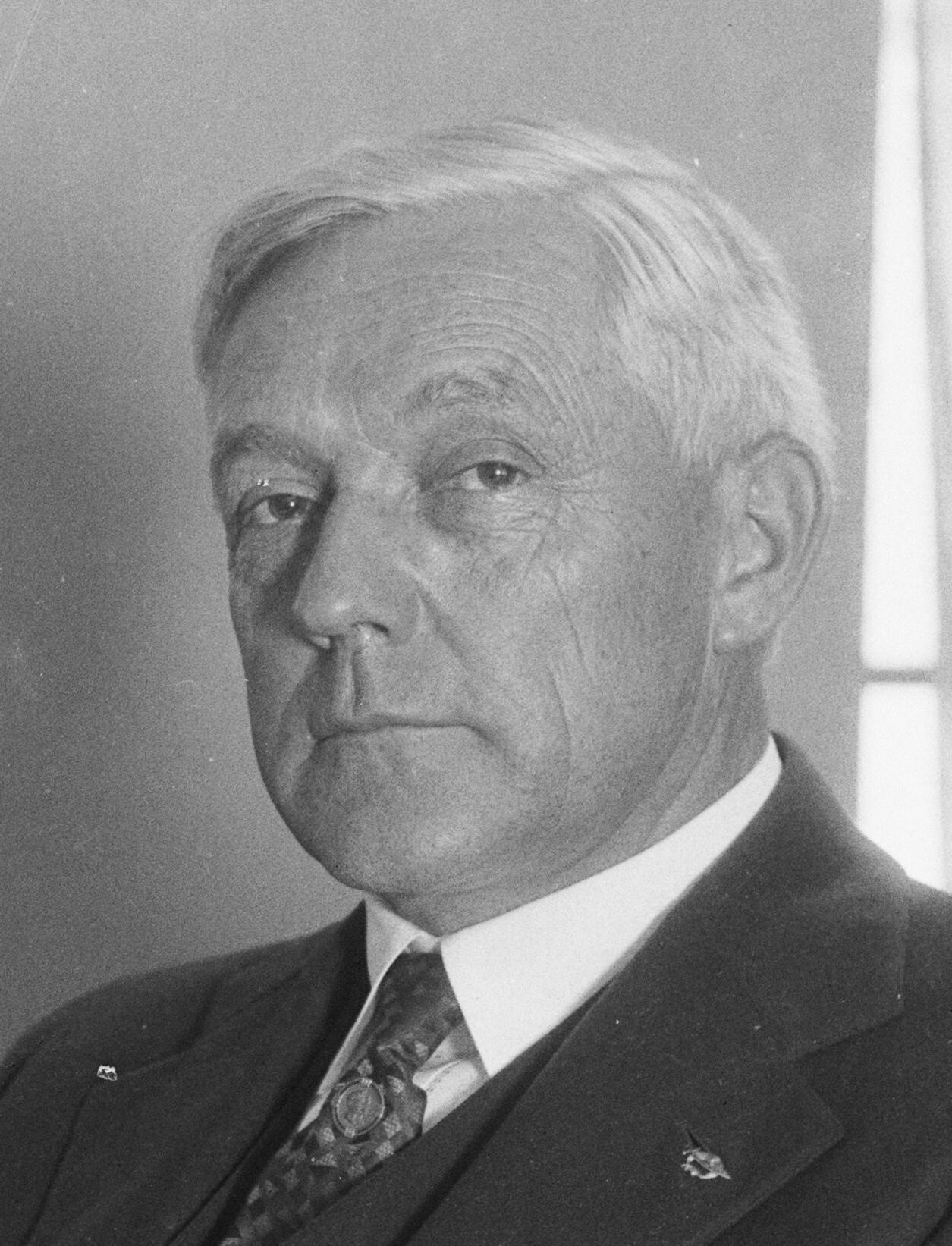

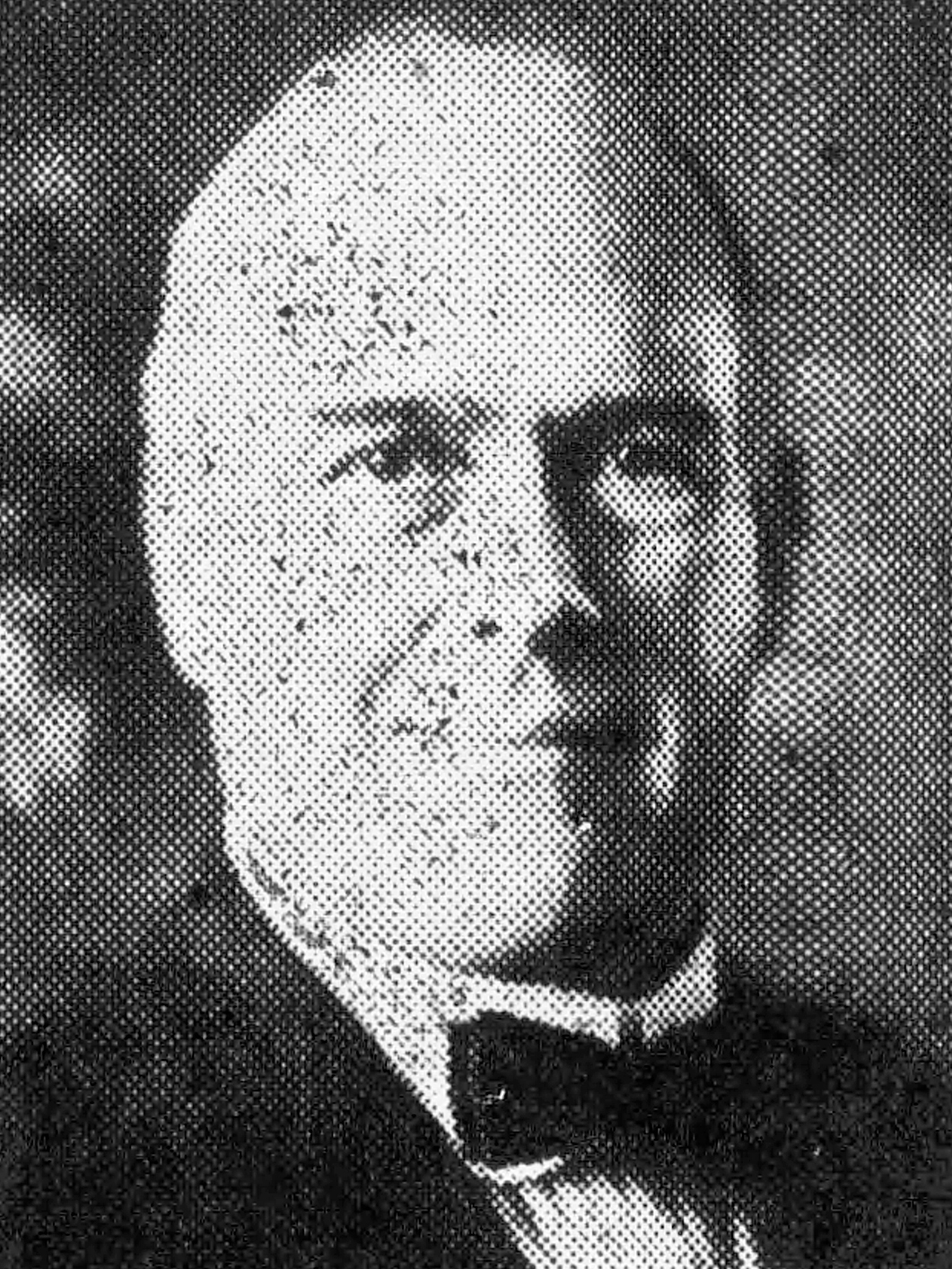
Candidate	George E. Cryer	Benjamin F. Bledsoe	Miles S. Gregory
Popular vote	82,186	67,722	9,540
Percentage	51.2%	42.2%	6.0%
Mayor before election
George E. Cryer
Elected Mayor
George E. Cryer

The 1925 Los Angeles mayoral election took place on May 5, 1925. Incumbent George E. Cryer was re-elected, defeating five challengers including judge Benjamin Franklin Bledsoe and Councilmember Miles S. Gregory and winning outright without the need of a general election.

Municipal elections in California, including Mayor of Los Angeles, are officially nonpartisan; candidates' party affiliations do not appear on the ballot.

== Election ==
Incumbent George E. Cryer had been elected in 1921 and was now seeking re-election for a third term. The election came after the passage of the 1925 charter, which amended the dates of elections and term years; the election was now on odd-numbered years and the term was extended to four years instead of two.

Cryer was challenged by Benjamin Franklin Bledsoe, a district judge from the United States District Court for the Southern District of California. Bledsoe, a Democrat, was supported by many women in Los Angeles and prominent attorney W. H. Anderson. He had been urged to run in the election by many leaders, and had stayed quiet about his plans until his announcement to run.

In February 1925, Sylvester Weaver, president of the Los Angeles Chamber of Commerce, and Assemblymember Thomas L. Dodge withdrew from the race, leaving the main competition between Cryer and Bledsoe; Weaver endorsed Bledsoe for the race.

Although Bledsoe was predicted to have an advantage due to a heavy vote, Cryer defeated all his opponents and was re-elected. The election was challenged by Edna Allen, who was an elector in the primary, who said that judges in all the districts counted ballots for Cryer that weren't meant for him.

== Results ==
Los Angeles mayoral general election, May 5, 1925
Candidate	Votes	%
George E. Cryer (incumbent)	82,186	51.24
Benjamin Franklin Bledsoe	67,722	42.22
Miles S. Gregory	9,540	5.95
Edgar McKee	390	0.24
E. J. Rindler	332	0.21
Ralph L. Knapp	229	0.14
Total votes	258,420	100.00
