= Kathryn Woodman Leighton =

American artist

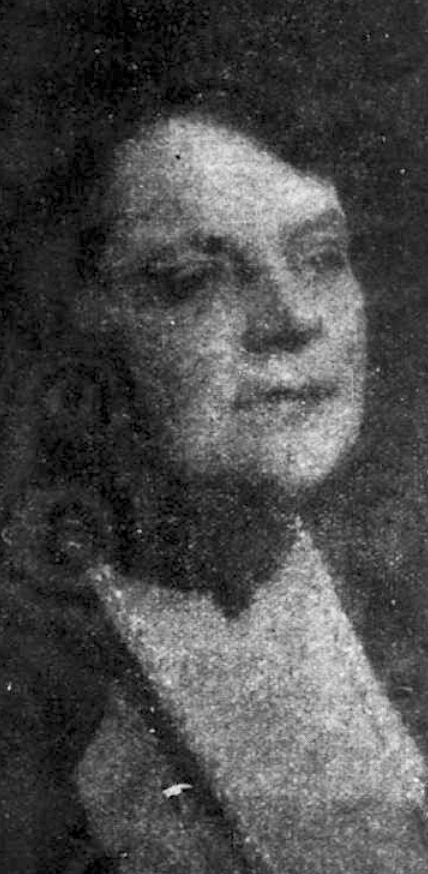
- Kathryn W. Leighton, from a 1927 magazine
- Born: Kathyrn Woodman; March 1, 1875; Plainfield, New Hampshire
- Died: July 1, 1952 (aged 77)
- Education: Kimball Union Academy, Boston Normal Art School
- Movement: California Art Club, Los Angeles Art Association
- Spouse: Edward Everett Leighton

Kathryn Woodman Leighton (March 17, 1875 − July 1, 1952) was an American artist, based in Los Angeles, California, best known for her Western landscapes and for portraits of Native Americans.

== Early life and education ==
Kathryn Woodman was born in Plainfield, New Hampshire, in 1875 (some sources give 1876), the daughter of Alfred Woodman and Marie Thomas Gallup Woodman. Her father was a Civil War veteran. Woodman graduated from Kimball Union Academy in Plainfield. She studied art at the Boston Normal Art School in Boston, Massachusetts.

== Career ==
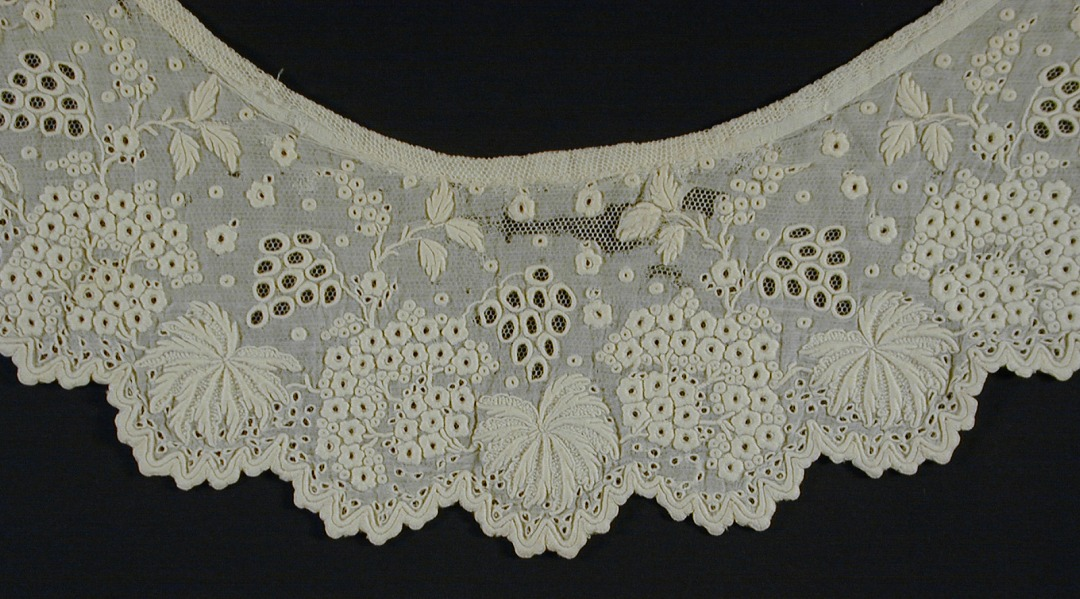
Woman's Collar LACMA 33.24.2 (2 of 2), donated to LACMA by Kathryn W. Leighton

Kathryn Woodman Leighton moved to Los Angeles with her husband in 1910. She had a studio at the couple's home on West 46th Street, in South Los Angeles. She traveled to the Canadian Rockies in 1923, and to Glacier National Park in 1925, to paint landscapes. In 1926, she returned to Glacier National Park, this time as the guest of the Great Northern Railway, commissioned to paint scenes of life among the Blackfeet, including portraits of the tribal leaders. The railroad used Leighton's paintings to promote Western tourism, and Leighton's work turned from landscapes to Native American portraits. She often used Native American actors as models in her Los Angeles studio. She painted a life-sized portrait of Los Angeles suffragist and clubwoman Florence Collins Porter in 1930.

Her paintings were not innovative in form, but they were hailed as "distinctive" and "historical" for their content; "Kathryn Leighton has painted the Indian aristocracy as Van Dyke painted the British aristocracy," declared a Los Angeles Times critic. However, another Los Angeles Times critic commented that the portraits "command my respect and admiration--and yet I do not personally like them."

Leighton served a term as president of the California Art Club, and was a member of the Los Angeles Art Association and the Laguna Art Association. In 1930, works by Leighton were exhibited at Knoedler Galleries in Paris. Her work was part of the painting event in the art competition at the 1932 Summer Olympics. She had a solo exhibition of her works at the Los Angeles County Museum of Art in 1940. She also donated some of her antique lace collection to LACMA.

Her brother Frederic T. Woodman was mayor of Los Angeles from 1916 to 1919, and displayed many of Kathryn's paintings in the mayor's office.

== Personal life and legacy ==
Kathryn Woodman married attorney Edward Everett Leighton in 1900; they adopted a son, Everett Woodman Leighton, who followed his father into a law career. She was widowed when Edward died in 1941, and she died in 1952.

Leighton's paintings continue to be collected and exhibited, often in shows about women artists in the American West. In 2007 she was included in a show at the University of Wyoming Art Museum. The Smithsonian American Art Museum has one painting by Leighton in its collection, a portrait of Iron Eyes Cody.
