= Florence Collins Porter =

American temperance worker (1853–1930)

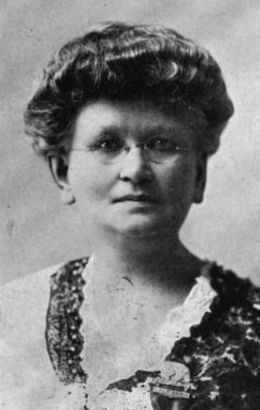
- Florence Collins Porter, from a 1913 publication.
- Born: Florence Collins; August 14, 1853; Caribou, Maine
- Died: December 31, 1930 (aged 77); Los Angeles, California
- Years active: 1880s-1930
- Known for: Newspaper editor, clubwoman, temperance activist, suffragist, Republican campaigner
- Notable work: President, Los Angeles Equal Suffrage League

Florence Collins Porter (August 14, 1853 – December 31, 1930) was an American newspaper editor, clubwoman, political campaigner, and activist for temperance and women's suffrage.

== Early life ==
Florence Collins was born August 14, 1853, in Caribou, Maine, the daughter of Samuel W. Collins and Dorcas Hardison Collins. Her parents ran the town's general store.

== Education and journalism ==
Porter was the first woman to serve on a Board of Education in Maine, and was superintendent of schools in Caribou for four years. In 1900, she was owner and publisher of the Aroostook Register, and president of the Maine Federation of Women's Clubs; that year, her uncle, oilman Wallace Hardison, invited her to California to join the editorial staff the Los Angeles Herald, which he owned. She also wrote and edited for the magazine California Outlook. and wrote political opinion pieces for various publications. She was a popular guest speaker, invited to speak on a range of topics, including "Myths and Legends of Maine" for the Pine Tree State Association of Los Angeles, in 1916.

Porter co-wrote a book of family history with her sister, Clara W. Gries, Our Folks and Your Folks: A Volume of Family History and Biographical Sketches (1919). She edited a book, The Story of the McKinley Home for Boys (1921), and co-edited another book, Maine Men and Women in Southern California (1913).

== Temperance, suffrage, clubwork ==
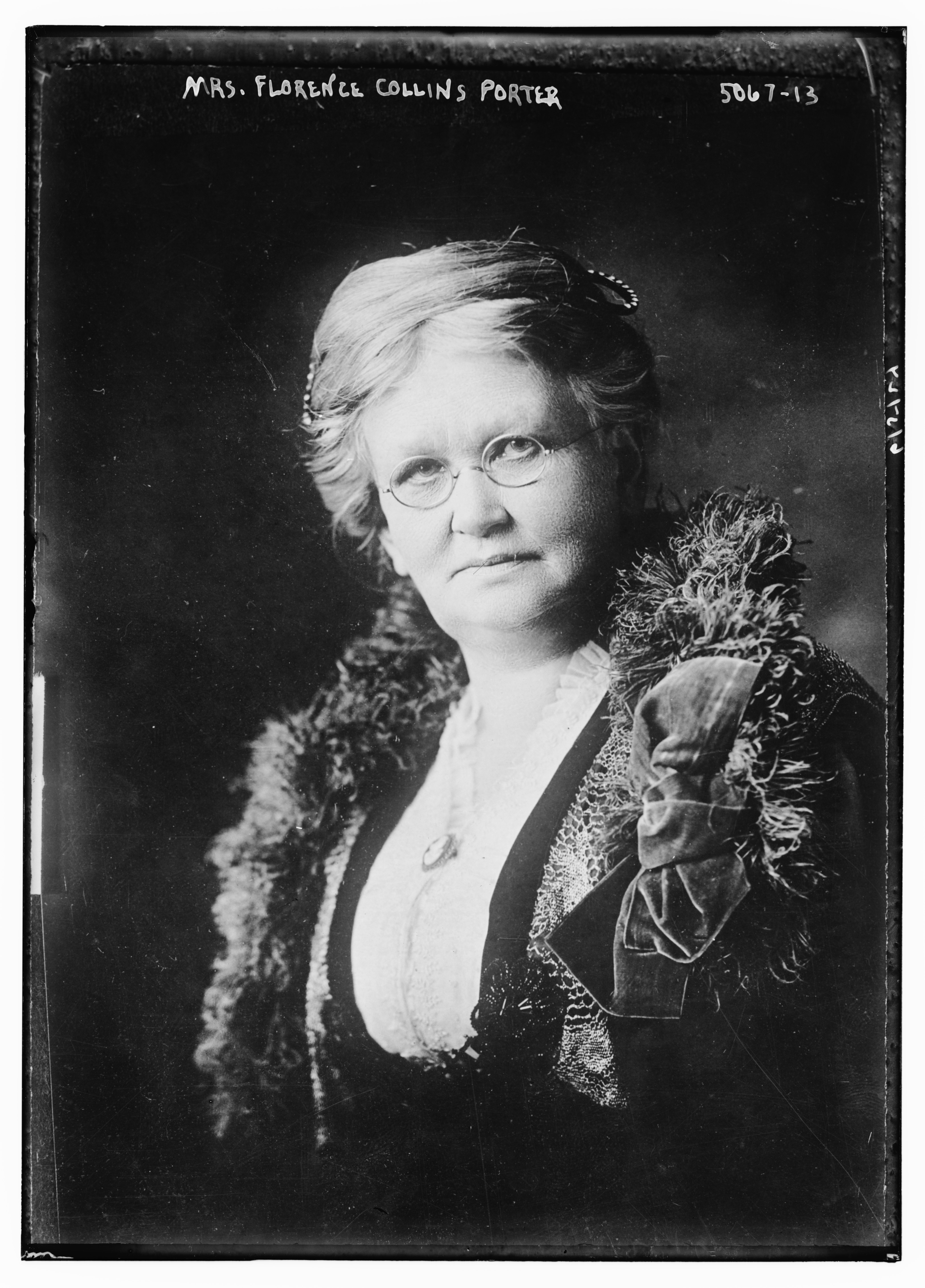
Florence Collins Porter, from the Library of Congress.

Porter attended the World Congress of Representative Women in 1893, where she gave a paper titled "The Power of Womanliness in Dealing with Stern Problems." For her, those "stern problems" facing women included temperance and suffrage. She joined the Woman's Christian Temperance Union, and was a national officer in the offshoot Non-Partisan National Woman's Christian Temperance Union when it was founded in 1888. She was president of the Los Angeles County Equal Suffrage League for two years. She was vice-president of the California Federation of Women's Clubs in 1906–1908. In 1909, she was president of the California Business Women's Association of Los Angeles. In 1916, she was secretary-treasurer of the Norwalk State Hospital. She was a member of the Ebell Club, the Tuesday Morning Club, and the Women's Improvement Club of Pasadena. "I am a woman's woman," she declared in a 1923 speech. "I find no fault with women in the mass. To me, organization women are always kind, beautiful, and achieving."

== Party politics ==
Porter was active in Republican and Progressive Party politics in California. She was vice president of the Roosevelt Progressive League in Los Angeles after it formed in 1912. She was one of two women to serve as California delegates to the 1912 Republican National Convention in Chicago. She was also an elector that year. In 1918 she campaigned for William Stephens in the California gubernatorial race. In 1920 she organized the Los Angeles Republican Study Club, a precursor of the California Federation of Republican Women. She helped to found the National Women's Republican Association, and seconded the nomination of Calvin Coolidge at the 1924 Republican National Convention. She campaigned for Herbert Hoover in 1928. A portrait of Porter, painted by Kathryn Woodman Leighton, was unveiled at a luncheon honoring Porter, held by the San Pedro Republican Women's Club in 1930.

== Personal life ==
In 1873, Florence Collins married Rev. Charles William Porter, a Congregational minister who also served in the Maine state legislature. They had three children. Rev. Porter died in 1894. She moved to South Pasadena, California in 1900, and died December 31, 1930, aged 77 years.

Her great-great-grandniece, Susan Collins, is a current United States Senator from Maine. Other notable kin of Porter's include her great-grandnephews Maine politician and judge Samuel Collins (1923-2012) and Maine legislator Donald Collins (1925-2018).
