= Los Angeles Art Association =

American nonprofit organization

- Founded: 1925
- Type: nonprofit arts organization
- Location: 825 N. La Cienega Blvd., Los Angeles, CA 90069
- Region served: Southern California
- Products: Contemporary Art
- Services: Exhibition, Mentorship, Artist Career Workshops, Panel discussion, Film & Video 825, Peer Review Groups, Public Art Classes, International Cultural Exchange
- Members: 377
- Key people: Peter Mays, Nancy Kaye, Midge Lynn, Linda Johannesen, Rebecca Hamm, Michael E. Napoliello Jr., Melissa Pugash, Neil Wertlieb
- Employees: 3
- Website: www.laaa.org

The Los Angeles Art Association (LAAA), a non-profit arts organization founded in 1925, helps up-and-coming artists. It was created to let people in Los Angeles see high-quality art and build a collection of European and American art for the city.
