= 1921 Los Angeles mayoral election =

- June 7, 1921
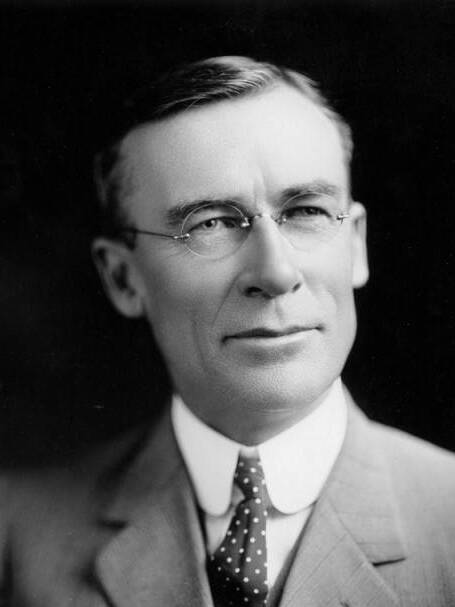

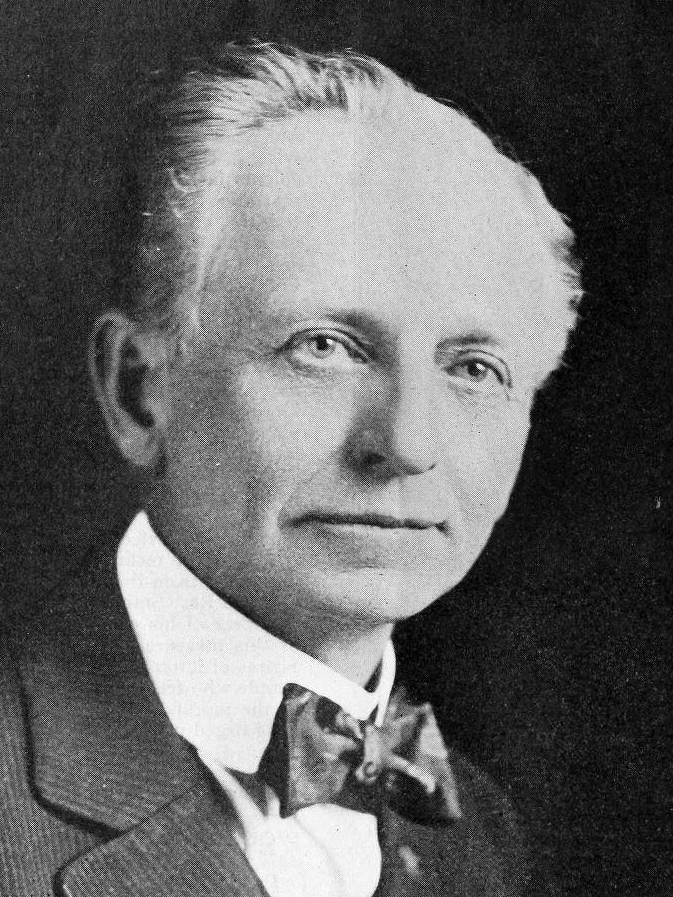

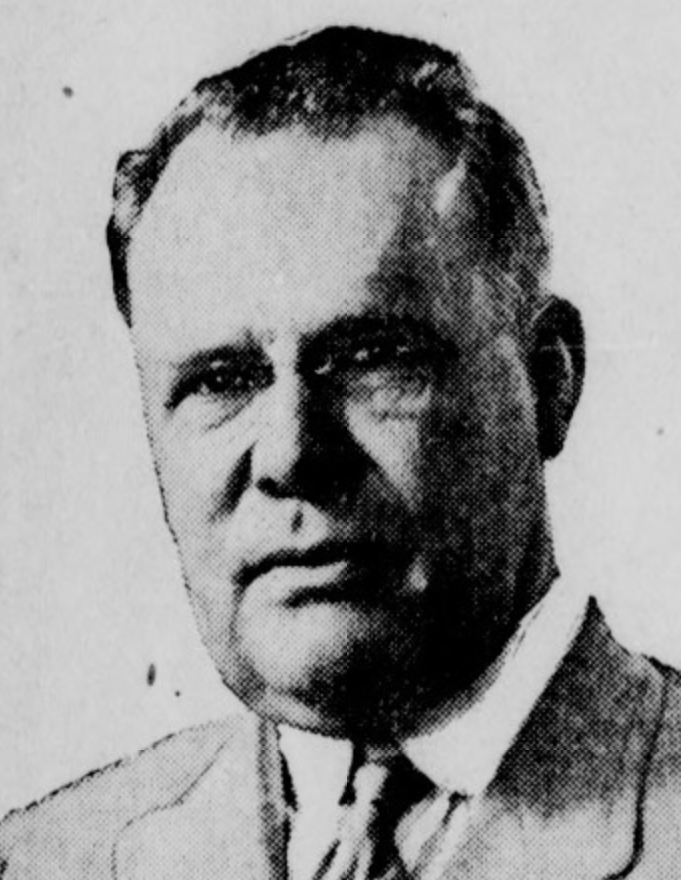
Candidate	George E. Cryer	Meredith P. Snyder	Boyle Workman
First round	30,854; 38.8%	33,378; 42.0%	12,982; 16.3%
Runoff	37,510; 52.89%	33,411; 47.11%	Eliminated
Mayor before election
Meredith P. Snyder
Elected Mayor
George E. Cryer

The 1921 Los Angeles mayoral election took place on June 7, 1921. Incumbent Meredith P. Snyder was defeated by George E. Cryer. It was the last time Snyder ran for Mayor.

Municipal elections in California, including Mayor of Los Angeles, are officially nonpartisan; candidates' party affiliations do not appear on the ballot.

== Election ==
Incumbent Democratic mayor Meredith P. Snyder had previously been elected in 1919 and was running for a fourth term. He was challenged by Republican George E. Cryer, who attacked Snyder for being corrupt and was supported by the Los Angeles Police Commissioner and the Los Angeles Times. Cryer stated that he was a non-politician and would conduct the business of Los Angeles "like any other business... quietly, effectively, efficiently." Former city councilmember Boyle Workman also challenged Snyder for the seat.

== Results ==
Los Angeles mayoral primary election, May 6, 1921
Candidate	Votes	%
Meredith P. Snyder (incumbent)	33,378	41.97
George E. Cryer	30,854	38.80
Boyle Workman	12,982	16.33
William L. Smith	1,469	1.85
Alfred A. Wright	512	0.64
Hayden Morgan	325	0.41
Total votes	79,520	100.00

Los Angeles mayoral general election, June 7, 1921
Candidate	Votes	%
George E. Cryer	37,510	52.89
Meredith P. Snyder (incumbent)	33,411	47.11
Total votes	70,921	100.00
