= Charles E. Sebastian =

American politician and police chief (1873–1929)

Charles Edward Sebastian
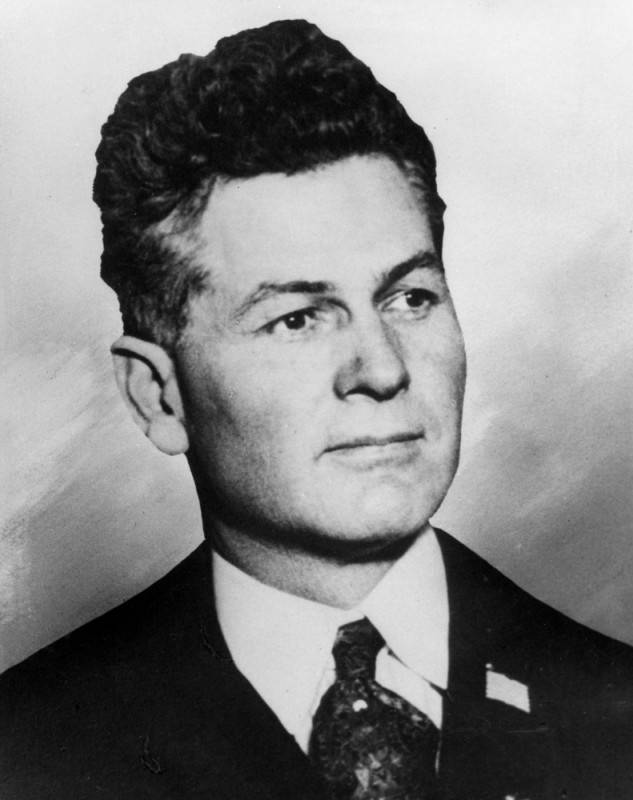
- Portrait of Mayor Charles Edward Sebastian

30th Mayor of Los Angeles
- In office July 1, 1915 – September 2, 1916
- Preceded by: Henry Rose
- Succeeded by: Frederic T. Woodman

Personal details
- Born: March 30, 1873 Farmington, Missouri, U.S.
- Died: April 17, 1929 (aged 56) Los Angeles, California, U.S.

Charles Edward Sebastian (March 30, 1873 – April 17, 1929) was the 30th mayor of Los Angeles, California, serving from 1915 to 1916. He was a Democrat.

== Biography ==
He was born in Farmington, Missouri, on March 30, 1873. He grew up in Artesia, California and was baptized in the Artesia Christian Church.

Originally a patrolman in the LAPD, Sebastian climbed the ranks to Chief of Police and served in that office from January 3, 1911 to July 16, 1915. He was the first L.A. police chief to be elected mayor, due in no small part to his crusade against vice. While running for office he became embroiled in a litany of charges but was later acquitted of them all. He did, however, later depart City Hall after adverse publicity concerning his personal life arose from the publication of letters of a damaging nature. According to Thomas Reppetto's The Blue Parade, "In 1915 he resigned to run for mayor but was accused of illicit relations with young ladies. Defended by Earl Rogers, he beat the charge and was elected. The next year, however, the accusations were proved, and to them were added new charges of extortion. Sebastian countered by staging a phony attempt on his life, but the plot was revealed and he resigned."

During his brief mayoralty, Sebastian oversaw the annexation of numerous outlying areas, including most of the San Fernando Valley and the West Side.

He died April 17, 1929, and is interred at Glen Haven Memorial Park in Sylmar, California.

Police appointments
Preceded by Alexander Galloway	Chief of LAPD; 1911–1915	Succeeded by Clarence E. Snively
