= George E. Cryer =

American lawyer and politician (1875–1961)

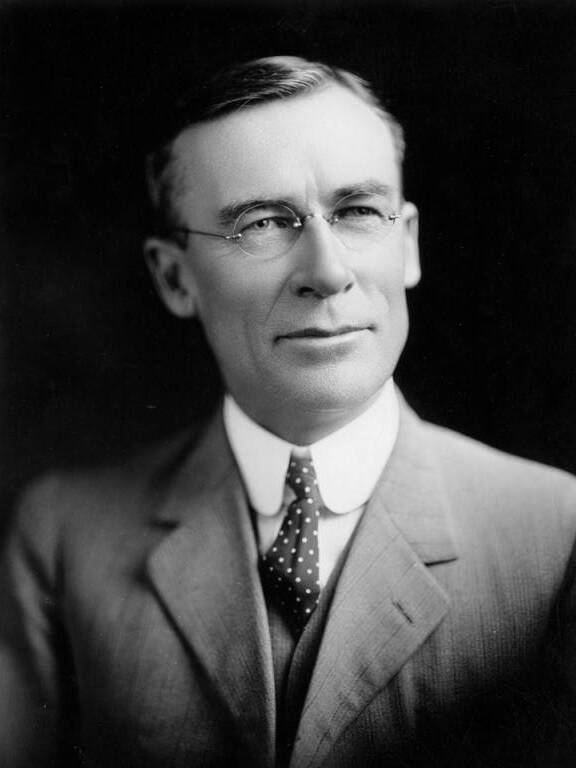
- Portrait by Fred Hartsook, 1925

32nd Mayor of Los Angeles
- In office July 1, 1921 – July 1, 1929
- Preceded by: Meredith P. Snyder
- Succeeded by: John C. Porter

Personal details
- Born: George Edward Cryer; May 13, 1875 Waterloo, Nebraska, U.S.
- Died: May 24, 1961 (aged 86) Los Angeles, California, U.S.
- Party: Republican
- Spouse: Isabel Grace Gay
- Children: 2
- Education: University of Michigan

George Edward Cryer (May 13, 1875 – May 24, 1961) was an American lawyer and politician. A Republican, Cryer served as the 32nd Mayor of Los Angeles from 1921 to 1929, a period of rapid growth in the city's population. During his administration, the Los Angeles City Hall and Los Angeles Memorial Coliseum were built, and the city's population surpassed 1,000,000. Prior and subsequent to serving as mayor, he was a lawyer. Between 1929 and 1931, Cryer became engaged in a widely publicized libel court case with the Reverend Robert P. Shuler, a radio evangelist who accused Cryer of being a "grafter" who had entered office a poor man and left office a millionaire.

== Early years ==
Born on a farm in Waterloo, Douglas County, Nebraska, Cryer moved to southern California with his family in 1885. He was educated in the Redlands and Pasadena public schools and graduated from Los Angeles High School. When the Spanish–American War was declared in 1898, Cryer volunteered and served as a private in Company G, Seventh California Infantry. He was mustered out with rank of sergeant.

After his military service, Cryer enrolled at the University of Michigan Law School where he was the assistant editor of the Michigan Law Review. He graduated with honors and began the practice of law in Los Angeles in 1903. In September 1906, Cryer married Isabel Grace Gay. Mrs. Cryer was also a graduate of the University of Michigan, though the two did not meet until they were both residents of Los Angeles. Cryer and his wife had a son, Edward Gay Cryer (born c. 1912) and a daughter, Catherine Christine Cryer (born c. 1915).

Cryer's first public office was as first assistant United States Attorney, a position he held from approximately 1910–1912. He then served as the chief assistant Los Angeles City Attorney (1912–1913) and the chief deputy Los Angeles County District Attorney (1915–1919). He gained fame for prosecution of public corruption. In 1917, he was the prosecutor in the corruption case brought against Los Angeles County Supervisor Richard H. Norton.

== Mayor of Los Angeles ==
Cryer was elected mayor of the City of Los Angeles in 1921 in a close election against the incumbent Meredith P. Snyder. Cryer's campaign promised to close the "dens of vice," and attacked Snyder as being corrupt and unfit to be mayor. The Los Angeles Police Commissioner sent a telegram to the newspapers before the election asking, "Shall crime and protected vice continue, or will the voters and taxpayers elect George E. Cryer mayor?" Cryer billed himself as a non-politician: "I know nothing about politics, and I shall never be a politician. I have an idea that the business of the City of Los Angeles can be conducted like any other business ... quietly, effectively, efficiently." The Los Angeles Times backed Cryer, noting, "To talk with George E. Cryer is to know instinctively that he is not a politician clutching at straws for a 'platform,' but that he is a quiet, effective man who does things."

Cryer was re-elected mayor in 1923 and again in 1925—the latter election was for the first four-year mayoral term. His eight-year administration was a period of explosive population growth, as the city passed 1,000,000 in population, and suburban sprawl began as businesses and residents moved west from the city's historic core. During his administration, large public works projects were launched, including the construction of the Los Angeles City Hall, the Central Library (built at a cost of $2.3 million), the Los Angeles Memorial Coliseum, and the Mulholland Highway. Cryer delivered the opening address and welcome the opening ceremony for the Coliseum on Armistice Day in 1923, and he led a parade of floats from the countries of the world as part of a ceremony marking the dedication of City Hall. The city also expanded its municipal-owned public utility system (the Los Angeles Department of Water and Power), and Cryer was instrumental in the passage of the legislation that provided for the construction of the Hoover Dam and All-American Canal, providing water and electricity to Los Angeles. The disappearance of Christine Collins' son, Walter, on March 10, 1928, also occurred during Cryer's mayoralty.

The disappearance brought publicity about the LAPD's lack of eagerness, incompetence and corruption concerning this case; for example, committing Christine to the local psychiatric ward when she publicly said a boy they claimed to have brought from DeKalb, Illinois (the boy was actually from Iowa) was not her son.

After the St. Francis Dam disaster in 1928, Cryer won national prominence and commendation for promptly accepting the city's responsibility for the disaster and agreeing to pay damages without the necessity of legal proceedings.

Cryer was also a leader in the successful effort to bring the 1932 Summer Olympic Games to Los Angeles. In May 1924, he declared a citywide half-day holiday and urged city residents to fill the new Los Angeles Memorial Coliseum to capacity for Olympic try-outs. By filling the Coliseum, Cryer sought to demonstrate the city's desire to host the Olympic Games. Cryer led a parade of athletes into the Coliseum for an event that included a boxing exhibition by Jack Dempsey.

Cryer was also an opponent of communism and the activities of the Industrial Workers of the World. On taking office in 1921, Cryer declared: "In this day of 'isms' and I.W.W. agitation, every enemy of our flag and country and institutions is carrying on this insidious propaganda of destruction, and it is, therefore, very necessary and proper that the forces of law and order should be alive, awake, and on guard."

== Allegations of corruption ==
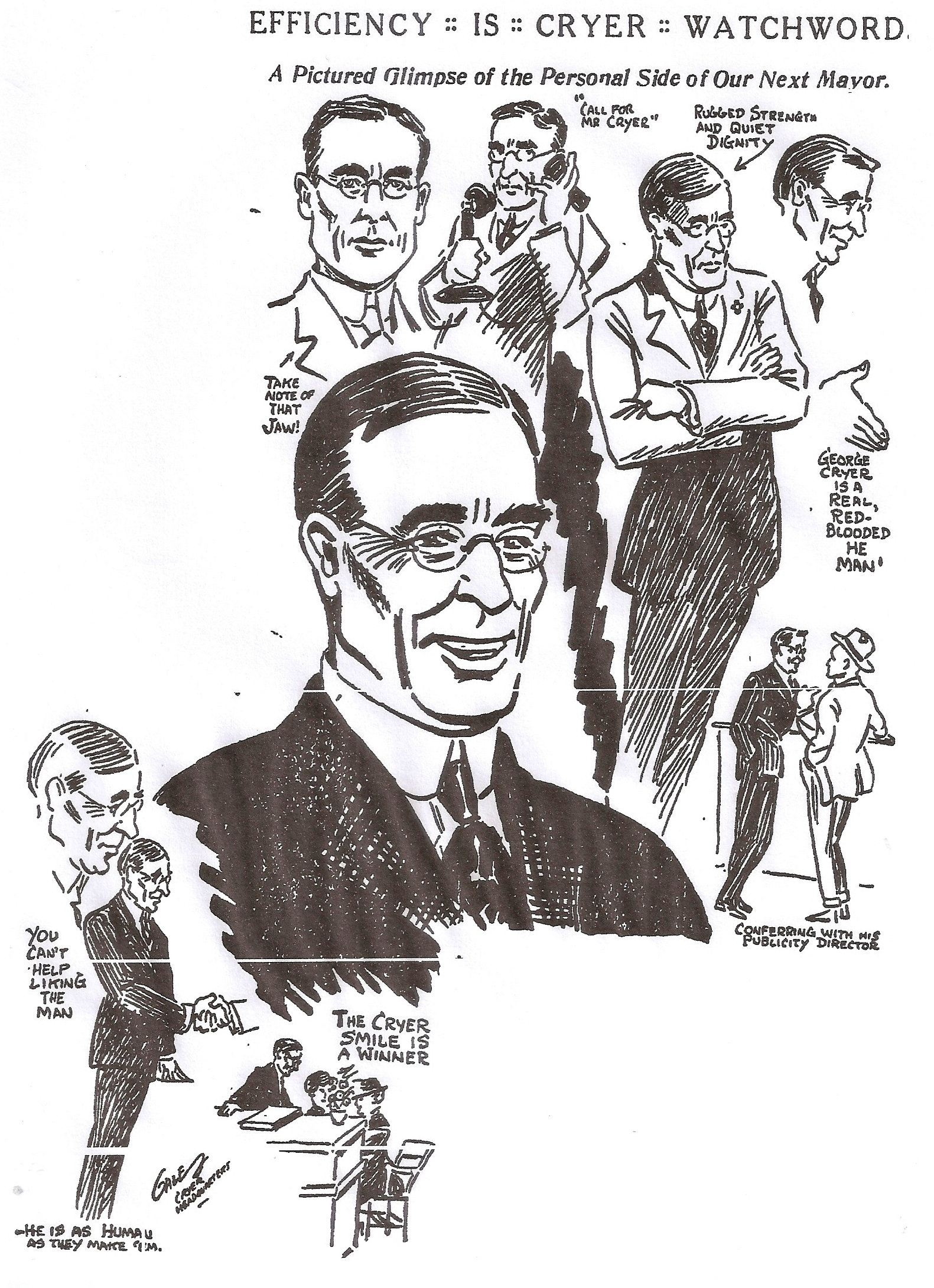
"George E. Cryer Sketched In Action", from the Los Angeles Times, March 26, 1921

Though Cryer had been elected to office as a reformer who would eliminate public corruption, Cryer's administration became the target of corruption claims. Cryer defended his integrity against such charges and asserted when he left office that "Los Angeles is now the cleanest large city in the country, far superior to any city anywhere comparable in size."

Some historical accounts indicate that Cryer was controlled by the city's political boss, Kent Kane Parrot, and a coterie of bootleggers and criminals, including "vice kingpin" Charles H. Crawford (a model for some of Raymond Chandler's villains). Indeed, the loosely organized crime syndicate operating within the city government became known as "the City Hall Gang" during the 1920s. Some have written that Cryer was a mere figurehead and that Parrot was the "de facto mayor" who ran the Harbor Commission and the Los Angeles Police Department, even transferring personnel without consulting with the city's police chief.

Cryer's opponent in 1925 focused attention on Parrot's role in city government: "I ask, as I shall continue to ask through this campaign: 'Mr. Cryer, how much longer is Kent Parrot going to be the de-facto Mayor of Los Angeles'?"

By 1927, the Los Angeles Times was openly critical of the relationship between Parrot and Cryer, referring to Cryer as Parrot's "personal mayor". Though the Times had been a strong backer of Cryer, the paper in 1927 published an editorial referring to the city government as "Our Local Tammany", a reference to Boss Tweed's Tammany Hall machine that controlled New York politics in the 19th century. The article ignored Cryer and focused its attack on the "clumsy" corruption of the political machine run by "Boss Parrot":

"Evidently Boss Parrot's subordinates are not well trained. Give him a few more years in control and he will, perhaps, do better. He must learn to think up plausible reasons for the actions of the organization and not let the purely political motive stick out like a sore thumb. Perhaps he thinks the voters of Los Angeles are so lacking in intelligence that this is unnecessary; if so, he is mistaken. It does not pay to be so raw anywhere."

A campaign to recall Cryer in 1927 was led by the City Planning Commissioner, Estelle Holman, and rumors spread that Cryer was "tired" and "weary" of the job, and that an "Unknown Committee of Twenty-Five" had formed to tell "the Parrot-Cryer lame-duck city 'administration' to ease the Mayor out of the side door of the City Hall."

By 1929, relations between the two principals of "the so-called Parrot-Cryer political machine" had been severed. Parrot leaked a report to the Los Angeles Record that Cryer would not seek re-election, and those close to Cryer openly charged Parrot with betraying the mayor. Cryer himself announced in late February 1929 that he would not run for re-election as mayor.

== Shuler libel trial ==
In the late 1920s, a popular radio evangelist, the Rev. Robert P. "Fighting Bob" Shuler, repeatedly branded Cryer as a "grafter" and the "chief exploiter," called his administration "one of the must corrupt the city ever saw," linked him to vice king Charlie Crawford, and asserted that Cryer went into office as a poor man and came out as a millionaire. Shuler's charges, made both on his radio station, KGEF, and in his magazine, led to a widely publicized libel lawsuit by Cryer against Shuler. The details of the Shuler libel suit were front-page news at the Los Angeles Times for much of 1929.

At the trial in November 1929, Shuler's lawyer cross-examined Cryer about allegations that he "pitched dice at in Farmer Page's place," and about his accumulation of wealth during his eight years as mayor. Cryer testified that he had a personal fortune of $160,000 when he took office in 1921 and left office in 1929 with a personal wealth of $450,000 which Cryer credited to "realty deals absolutely uninfluenced by his political position." Asked if he had ever taken a bribe, Cryer replied:

"No, sir; never at any time, directly or indirectly. I never profited by my office. In fact, I considered it a financial detriment. It was the darndest job I ever had. It took practically all of my time, Sundays and every other day, and most of the night. I had to take the telephone out of my house so I could get a little sleep. I used to come home at nights from a banquet or something and people would call me sometimes at 3 o'clock in the morning -- some of them apparently insane."

The jury found Shuler not guilty on one count and failed to reach a verdict on a second count. When Shuler continued his attacks on Cryer, Shuler brought further proceedings in 1931, this time an administrative action before the Federal Radio Commission ("FRC") seeking revocation of the broadcast license for Shuler's radio station, KGEF. Shuler's controversial broadcasts also included attacks on Catholics, African Americans, the YWCA (for sponsoring dances that extended into the early hours of Sunday morning), and Rufus B. von KleinSmid, the President of the University of Southern California for permitting evolution to be taught. In November 1931, Cryer succeeded in winning an order from the FRC revoking KGEF's broadcast license.

== Later years and death ==
After leaving office in 1929, Cryer went into the private practice of law. He ran for mayor again in 1933, but was defeated in the primary election. Cryer also served for a time as the president of Mutual Oil Company.

Cryer died at age 86 following surgery for a broken hip suffered when he tripped over a garden hose at his house in Los Angeles. As part of the city's memorial service, Cryer's body was carried into the rotunda of City Hall by an honor guard of policemen, a wreath placed on his casket by Mayor Norris Poulson, and his body lay in state in the rotunda. Cryer was entombed at Forest Lawn Mausoleum.

In the 2008 motion picture Changeling, the part of Mayor George Cryer was played by Reed Birney.
