= Meredith P. Snyder =

American politician and mayor (1859–1937)

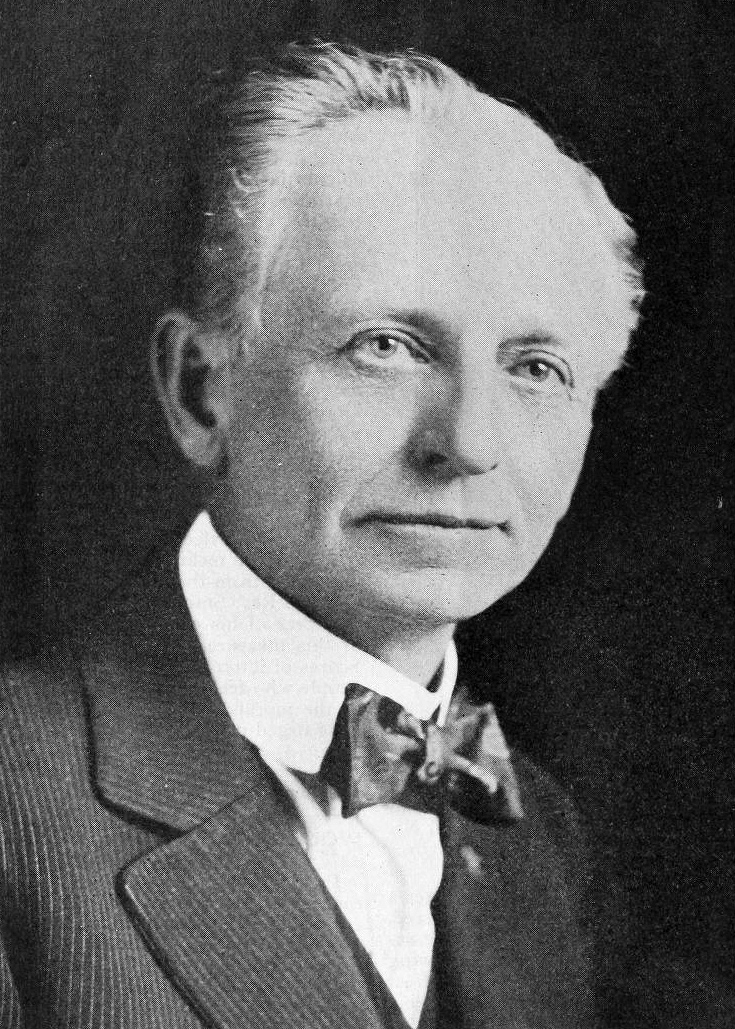
- Snyder in 1917

23rd Mayor of Los Angeles
- In office July 1, 1919 – July 1, 1921
- Preceded by: Frederic T. Woodman
- Succeeded by: George E. Cryer
- In office December 12, 1900 – December 8, 1904
- Preceded by: Fred Eaton
- Succeeded by: Owen McAleer
- In office December 16, 1896 – December 15, 1898
- Preceded by: Frank Rader
- Succeeded by: Fred Eaton

Member of the Los Angeles City Council for the 2nd ward
- In office December 12, 1894 – December 16, 1896
- Preceded by: Daniel Innes
- Succeeded by: Fred L. Baker

Personal details
- Born: October 22, 1859 Winston-Salem, North Carolina, U.S.
- Died: April 7, 1937 (aged 77) Los Angeles, California, U.S.
- Party: Democratic

Meredith Pinxton Snyder (October 22, 1859 – April 7, 1937) was a California property owner and businessman who was mayor of Los Angeles on three occasions from 1896 through 1921, and was also on the California Industrial Accident Commission.

== Personal ==
Snyder was born on October 22, 1859, in or near Winston-Salem, North Carolina, the son of Kehlin D. Snyder and Elizabeth Hire (Heiher). He went to public schools and then to Bethany and Schylo Academy and Yadkin College, all in North Carolina.

Snyder arrived in California in 1880 when he was 22, and he was married to May Ross of Washington, D.C., on February 14, 1888, in San Diego, California. They had one child, Ross Snyder, who was killed in World War I at the Battle of Chateau-Thierry in France. In 1923, Ross Snyder’s body was returned to Los Angeles, and lay in state for a day in Pershing Square before burial at Hollywood Cemetery.

Snyder was a Mason and an Elk and a member of the Jonathan Club, the Los Angeles Country Club, the Lomita Gun Club, the Knights of Pythias and the Knights Templar. He was a Protestant and a Democrat. His nickname was Pinky, "because of the color of his flaming red "side-burns".

He died at the Jonathan Club on April 7, 1937, at the age of 78, and his body lay in state in the City Hall, with interment at Hollywood Cemetery.

In 1990, the city of Hermosa Beach, California, included Pinxton's "extensively remodeled home", at No. 2020 The Strand, on a map guide to homes of notable people in that city.

== Vocation ==
Snyder established the M.P. Snyder Shoe Company in 1892. In 1904 he organized the California Savings Bank, of which he served as president for 14 years. At various times he was president of the Home Telephone Company in San Diego, owner of the Meredith office building, organizer and president of California Guaranty Corporation and an officer or director in the Gardena Bank and Trust Company, the American Druggist Syndicate and the Lomita Land and Water Company. He owned property in the San Joaquin Valley, which at first was farmed and later subdivided. This was the "old Dallas ranch, not far from the quaint little town of Hickman and the Dunkard settlement of Waterford". In 1905 he invested in a rubbish-disposal company.

== Public service ==
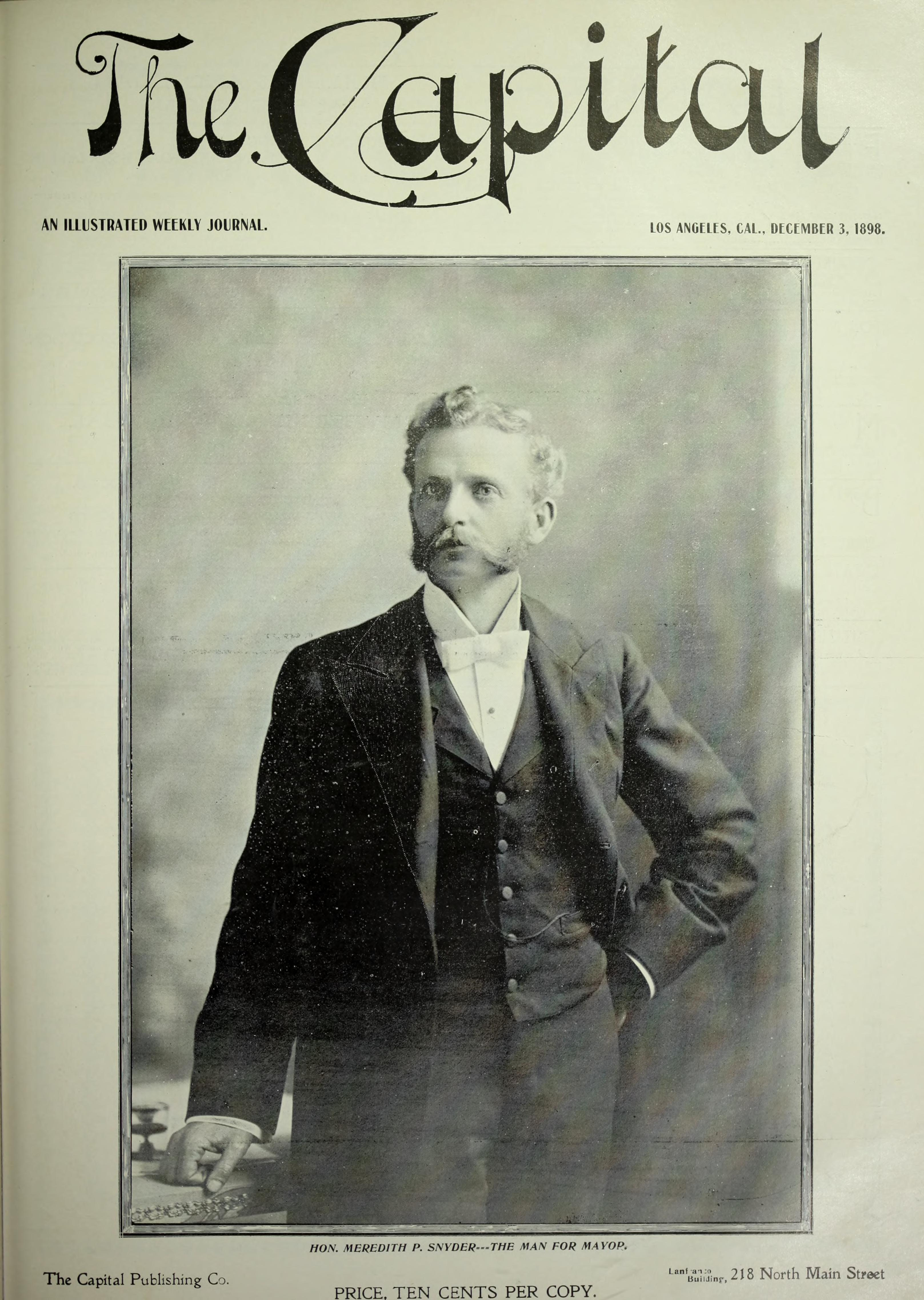
Snyder on the cover of The Capital, December 3, 1898

Having been a candidate for mayor on a "reform" ticket in 1896, Snyder was elected; he served as mayor of Los Angeles in 1896–1898, and was reelected in 1900 for another two terms. He was elected again in 1919, serving until June 1921; he ran again that year but lost to George E. Cryer. Snyder was also a police commissioner from 1901 to 1904, and a member of the City Council from 1904 to 1907. He was a Los Angeles City public service commissioner beginning in 1913 and serving until 1917 or 1918. His last appointment was Governor James Rolph's naming him to the State Industrial Accident Commission, from 1931 to 1935.

He was active in the successful movement to open Los Angeles Harbor and to connect it by a shoestring strip between Los Angeles and San Pedro and Wilmington. During his mayoralty, the Third Street Tunnel was bored through Bunker Hill, Los Angeles, in 1901, and the water system became municipally owned. He appointed the city's first Water Commission, which made plans to bring water to the city from the Owens Valley. Of him, historians Leonard Pitt and Dale Pitt said:

A Democrat in a period of Republican ascendancy, he was elected the first time because he favored municipal ownership of the waterworks. . . . In 1904 he opposed a corrupt printing contract between the city and the Republican Los Angeles Times. . . . His terms spanned a dynamic period in the city's history . . . .

== Police charge ==
Snyder was arrested and taken to the police station in May 1907 when his car, driven by a chauffeur, was pulled over on Broadway; it had been clocked by two officers on bicycles at 16 miles an hour crossing Third Street whereas a city ordinance limited the speed to 4 miles an hour at intersections.
