= List of mayors of Los Angeles =

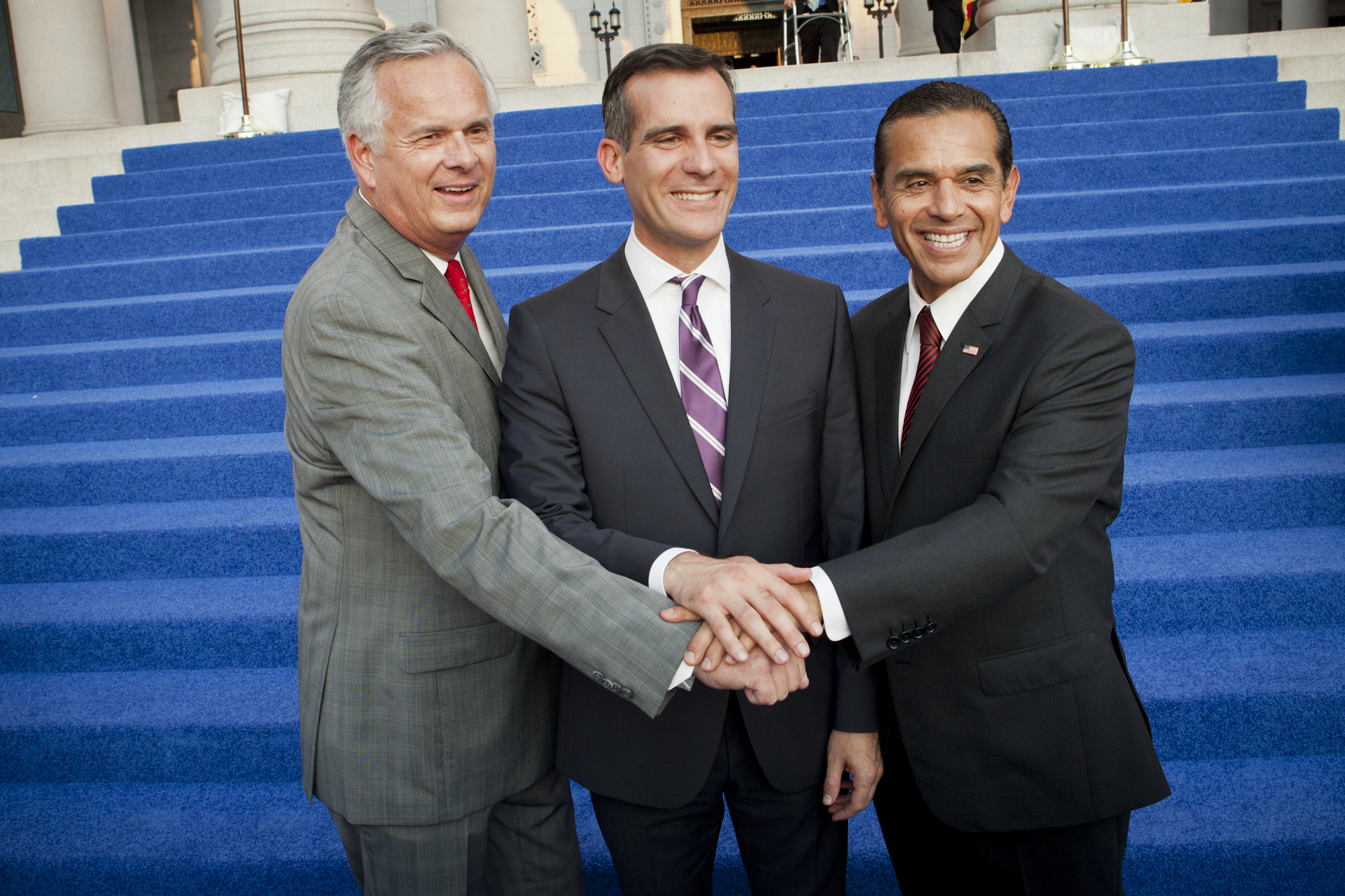
Then-Mayor Eric Garcetti (center) with his predecessors Antonio Villaraigosa (right) and James Hahn (left) in 2013.

The mayor of Los Angeles is the chief executive of the Government of Los Angeles as set in the city charter. The current officeholder, the 43rd in the sequence of regular mayors, is Karen Bass, a member of the Democratic Party.

When Los Angeles was founded as a small town, a comisionado (Military Commissioner) was appointed before the title was changed to alcalde (Mayor) in 1786. Between 1841 and 1844, there were two mayors called the Jueces de Paz (Justices of Peace). When the United States took control, the office was renamed to Mayor.

The longest serving mayors have been Tom Bradley (1973–1993; 20 years), Fletcher Bowron (1938–1953; 14 years), Sam Yorty (1961–1973; 12 years), and Eric Garcetti (2013–2022; 9 years). The shortest tenures, not counting Acting Mayors, were John Bryson (77 days), Bernard Cohn (14 days), and William Stephens (11 days).

Although the President of the Los Angeles City Council serves as acting mayor when the Mayor is out of the city, only five have served due to a vacancy: Manuel Requena (1855 and 1856), Wallace Woodworth (1860–1861), Bernard Cohn (1878), Niles Pease (1909), and Martin F. Betkouski (1916); only one, Cohn, ascended from Acting Mayor to Mayor. Two Mayors have died during their terms: Henry Mellus and Frederick A. MacDougall.

Los Angeles has had five Latino mayors post-incorporation: Antonio F. Coronel, Manuel Requena, Cristobal Aguilar, Antonio Villaraigosa, and Eric Garcetti. The city has also had two African-American mayors, Tom Bradley and Karen Bass. Two French-Canadian politicians, Damien Marchesseault and Prudent Beaudry, have served as Mayors. The first woman to serve as Mayor is Karen Bass, who was elected in 2022.

== Spanish era (1781–1821) ==
The office of Alcalde, the Mayor of El Pueblo de la Reina de los Ángeles, was elected annually, without the right to reelection for two years. With the incomplete nature of records from the Spanish colonial period of Los Angeles, only the first year of 1781 is certain.

Comisionado

Name	Term in office
José Vicente Féliz (Note: Féliz acted as the Chief Public Official during his term as Comisionado.)	1781–1786
Guillermo Soto (Note: Soto assumed the responsibilities of alcalde during his term as Comisionado.)	1812–1816

Alcalde

Name	Term in office
José Vanegas	1786–1788
José Sinova	1789–1790
Francisco Reyes	1790 (Note: Removed from office for gambling in July.)
Mariano Verdugo	1790–1793
José Vanegas	1792–1793
Francisco Reyes	1793–1795
José Vanegas	1796–1797
Manuel Arellanes	1797–1798
Guillermo Soto	1798–1799
Francisco Serrano	1799–1800
Joaquin Higuera	1800–1802
Mariano Verdugo	1802–1809
Francisco Avila	1810–1811
Manuel Gutierrez	1811–1812
Antonio Maria Lugo	1816–1819
Anastasio Avila	1819–1821

== Mexican era (1821–1848) ==
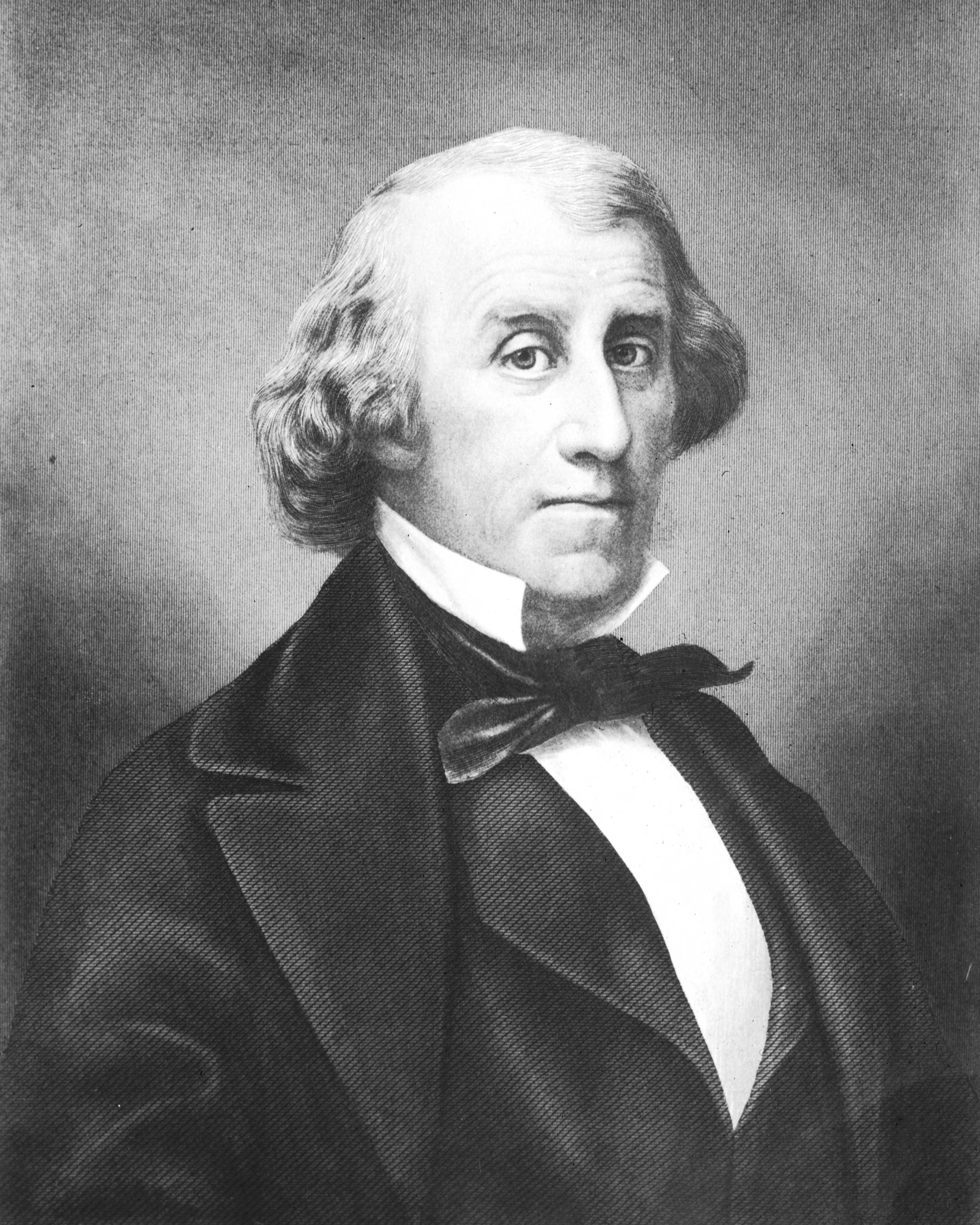
Abel Stearns, the inaugural mayor of Los Angeles from 1821 to 1822.

In 1821, Los Angeles came under Mexican rule, and the city continued having an alcalde. The inaugural holder was Abel Stearns, an American trader who came to California in 1829 from Massachusetts.

Name	Term in office
Abel Stearns	1821–1822
Manuel Gutierrez	1822–1824
Guillermo Cota	1824
Encarnacion Urquides	1824–1825
José Maria Avila	1825–1826
José Antonio Carrillo	1826
Claudio López	1826–1827
Guillermo Cota	1827–1828
José Antonio Carrillo	1828–1829
Guillermo Soto	1829–1830
Tiburcio Tapia	1830–1831
Manuel Dominguez	1832–1833
José Antonio Carrillo	1833–1834
José Perez	1834–1835
Francisco Javier Alvarado	1835–1836
Manuel Requena	1836–1837
José Sepúlveda	1837–1838
Luis Arenas	1838–1839

First & Second Alcalde

In 1839, instead of one alcalde, two officials served as First and Second Alcalde.

1st Alcalde	2nd Alcalde	Term in office
Tiburcio Tapia	José Sepúlveda	1839–1840

Jueces de Paz (Justices of Peace)

In 1841, the office of alcalde was abolished, instead being replaced by two Jueces de Paz (Justice of the peace).

1st Juez de Paz	2nd Juez de Paz	Term in office
Ygnacio Palomares	Ygnacio Alvarado	1841–1842
Manuel Dominguez	José Sepúlveda	1842–1843
Manuel Dominguez	Antonio F. Coronel	1843–1844

First & Second Alcalde

In 1844, the office of alcalde was restored, reverting to its 1839 posts.

1st Alcalde	2nd Alcalde	Term in office
Manuel Requena	Tiburcio Tapia	1844–1845
Vicente Sanchez	Juan Sepúlveda	1845–1846
Juan Gallardo	José Sepúlveda	1846–1847
José Salazar	Enrique Avila	1847–1848
Ygnacio Palomares	José Sepúlveda	1848

== American Territorial era (1848–1850) ==
Between the Interim government of California (1847-1850) and California's statehood (1850), the alcaldes of Los Angeles were was appointed by military governors and by the Governor of California.

Name	Portrait	Term in office
Stephen C. Foster		January 1, 1848 – May 21, 1849 (Note: Foster resigned as alcalde on May 21, 1849; the remainder of the year, he served as prefecto (prefect).)
Jose del Carmen Lugo		May 21 1849 - January 1 1850
Ygnacio del Valle		January 1, 1850 – July 1, 1850

== Post-incorporation (1850–present) ==
No. (Note: The City of Los Angeles counts one mayoralty for those who served multiple non-consecutive terms.)	Mayor	Took office	Left office	Tenure	Party (Note: In 1909, Los Angeles adopted a nonpartisan form of government, with the office and mayoral elections being officially nonpartisan since then.)	Election
1	Alpheus P. Hodges (1821–1858)	July 1, 1850	May 7, 1851	310 days	Democratic	1850
2	Benjamin Davis Wilson (1811–1878)	May 7, 1851	May 4, 1852	363 days	Democratic	1851
3	John G. Nichols (1812–1898); 1st time	May 4, 1852	May 3, 1853	364 days	Democratic	1852
4	Antonio F. Coronel (1817–1894)	May 3, 1853	May 4, 1854	1 year, 1 day	Democratic	1853
5	Stephen Clark Foster (1820–1898); 1st time	May 4, 1854	January 13, 1855 (Note: Foster resigned as Mayor to help lead a lynch mob against David Brown, a man who had killed one of Foster's friends and was given a stay of execution by the California Supreme Court. Manuel Requena, the President of the City Council, was the acting mayor in his absence. Foster was then re-elected via a special election.)	254 days	Democratic	1854
–	Manuel Requena (1802–1876); Acting	January 13, 1855	January 25, 1855	12 days	Republican	City Council; President acting as mayor
(5)	Stephen Clark Foster (1820–1898); 2nd time	January 25, 1855	May 9, 1855	104 days	Democratic	Jan. 1855
6	Thomas Foster (TBA–TBA)	May 9, 1855	May 7, 1856	364 days	Democratic	May 1855
(5)	Stephen Clark Foster (1820–1898); 3rd time	May 7, 1856	September 22, 1856 (Note: Foster resigned as mayor to attend to the executorship of the estate of his brother-in-law. City Council president Manuel Requena served as acting mayor until a special election could be held.)	138 days	Democratic	May 1856
–	Manuel Requena (1802–1876); Acting	September 22, 1856	October 4, 1856	12 days	Republican	City Council; President acting as mayor
(3)	John G. Nichols (1812–1898); 2nd time	October 4, 1856	May 9, 1859	2 years, 217 days	Democratic	Oct. 1856
(3)	John G. Nichols (1812–1898); 2nd time	October 4, 1856	May 9, 1859	2 years, 217 days	Democratic	1857
(3)	John G. Nichols (1812–1898); 2nd time	October 4, 1856	May 9, 1859	2 years, 217 days	Democratic	1858
7	Damien Marchesseault (1818–1868); 1st time	May 9, 1859	May 9, 1860	1 year, 0 days	Democratic	1859
8	Henry Mellus (1816–1860)	May 9, 1860	December 26, 1860 (Note: Died in office.)	231 days	Democratic	1860
–	Wallace Woodworth (1832–1882); Acting	December 26, 1860 (Note: Mellus died in office on December 26, 1860. City Council president Wallace Woodworth served as acting mayor until a special election could be held.)	January 7, 1861	12 days	Democratic	City Council; President acting as mayor
(7)	Damien Marchesseault (1818–1868); 2nd time	January 7, 1861	May 5, 1865	4 years, 118 days	Democratic	1861
(7)	Damien Marchesseault (1818–1868); 2nd time	January 7, 1861	May 5, 1865	4 years, 118 days	Democratic	1862
(7)	Damien Marchesseault (1818–1868); 2nd time	January 7, 1861	May 5, 1865	4 years, 118 days	Democratic	1863
(7)	Damien Marchesseault (1818–1868); 2nd time	January 7, 1861	May 5, 1865	4 years, 118 days	Democratic	1864
9	José Mascarel (1816–1899)	May 5, 1865	May 10, 1866	1 year, 5 days	Republican	1865
10	Cristobal Aguilar (1816–1886); 1st time	May 10, 1866	May 8, 1867 (Note: Aguilar was unseated for three months and replaced with Marchesseault, who as Zanjero of Los Angeles was considered more important than the mayor. Aguilar was reinstated on August 8, 1867.)	363 days	Democratic	1866
(7)	Damien Marchesseault (1818–1868); 3rd time	May 8, 1867	August 8, 1867	92 days	Democratic	1867
(10)	Cristobal Aguilar (1816–1886); 2nd time	August 8, 1867	December 7, 1868	1 year, 121 days	Democratic	–
11	Joel Turner (1820?–1888)	December 9, 1868	December 9, 1870	2 years, 0 days	Democratic	1868
11	Joel Turner (1820?–1888)	December 9, 1868	December 9, 1870	2 years, 0 days	Democratic	1869
(10)	Cristobal Aguilar (1816–1886); 3rd time	December 9, 1870	December 5, 1872	1 year, 362 days	Democratic	1870
(10)	Cristobal Aguilar (1816–1886); 3rd time	December 9, 1870	December 5, 1872	1 year, 362 days	Democratic	1871
12	James R. Toberman (1836–1911); 1st time	December 5, 1872	December 18, 1874	2 years, 13 days	Democratic	1872
12	James R. Toberman (1836–1911); 1st time	December 5, 1872	December 18, 1874	2 years, 13 days	Democratic	1873
13	Prudent Beaudry (1819–1893)	December 18, 1874	December 8, 1876	1 year, 356 days	Democratic	1874
13	Prudent Beaudry (1819–1893)	December 18, 1874	December 8, 1876	1 year, 356 days	Democratic	1875
14	Frederick A. MacDougall (1818–1878)	December 8, 1876	November 16, 1878	1 year, 343 days	Democratic	1876
14	Frederick A. MacDougall (1818–1878)	December 8, 1876	November 16, 1878	1 year, 343 days	Democratic	1877
–	Bernard Cohn (1835–1889); Acting, then appointed	November 16, 1878 (Note: MacDougall died on November 16, 1878. City Council president Bernard Cohn served as acting mayor until he was appointed by the council to become Mayor.)	November 21, 1878	5 days	Democratic	City Council; President acting as mayor
15	Bernard Cohn (1835–1889); Acting, then appointed	November 21, 1878	December 5, 1878	14 days	Democratic	App.
(12)	James R. Toberman (1836–1911); 2nd time	December 5, 1878	December 9, 1882	4 years, 4 days	Democratic	1878
(12)	James R. Toberman (1836–1911); 2nd time	December 5, 1878	December 9, 1882	4 years, 4 days	Democratic	1879
(12)	James R. Toberman (1836–1911); 2nd time	December 5, 1878	December 9, 1882	4 years, 4 days	Democratic	1880
(12)	James R. Toberman (1836–1911); 2nd time	December 5, 1878	December 9, 1882	4 years, 4 days	Democratic	1881
16	Cameron E. Thom (1825–1915)	December 9, 1882	December 9, 1884	2 years, 0 days	Democratic	1882
16	Cameron E. Thom (1825–1915)	December 9, 1882	December 9, 1884	2 years, 0 days	Democratic	1883
17	Edward Falles Spence (1832–1892)	December 9, 1884	December 14, 1886	2 years, 5 days	Republican	1884
17	Edward Falles Spence (1832–1892)	December 9, 1884	December 14, 1886	2 years, 5 days	Republican	1885
18	William H. Workman (1839–1918)	December 14, 1886	December 10, 1888	1 year, 362 days	Democratic	1886
18	William H. Workman (1839–1918)	December 14, 1886	December 10, 1888	1 year, 362 days	Democratic	1887
19	John Bryson (1852–1915)	December 10, 1888	February 25, 1889 (Note: Due to a change in the city's election calendar, Bryson's term was cut short due to voters' adoption of a new city charter and Hazard's subsequent election.)	77 days	Democratic	1888
20	Henry T. Hazard (1844–1921)	February 25, 1889	December 5, 1892	3 years, 291 days	Republican	1889
20	Henry T. Hazard (1844–1921)	February 25, 1889	December 5, 1892	3 years, 291 days	Republican	1890
–	William Hartshorn Bonsall (1846–1905); Acting	December 5, 1892 (Note: City Council president William H. Bonsall served as acting mayor for a week during the vacancy between the terms of Hazard and Rowan's terms.)	December 12, 1892	7 days	Republican	City Council; President acting as mayor
21	Thomas E. Rowan (1842–1901)	December 12, 1892	December 12, 1894	2 years, 0 days	Democratic	1892
22	Frank Rader (1848–1897)	December 12, 1894	December 16, 1896	2 years, 4 days	Republican	1894
23	Meredith P. Snyder (1859–1937); 1st time	December 16, 1896	December 15, 1898	1 year, 364 days	Democratic	1896
24	Frederick Eaton (1856–1934)	December 15, 1898	December 12, 1900	1 year, 362 days	Republican	1898
(23)	Meredith P. Snyder (1859–1937); 2nd time	December 12, 1900	December 8, 1904	3 years, 362 days	Democratic	1900
(23)	Meredith P. Snyder (1859–1937); 2nd time	December 12, 1900	December 8, 1904	3 years, 362 days	Democratic	1902
25	Owen McAleer (1858–1944)	December 8, 1904	December 13, 1906	2 years, 5 days	Republican	1904
26	Arthur Cyprian Harper (1866–1948)	December 13, 1906	March 11, 1909 (Note: Harper resigned as mayor on March 11, 1909 in the wake of a recall election against him. William Stephens, who was named as Harper's opponent in the recall, was appointed as mayor before the next election.)	2 years, 88 days	Democratic	1906
–	Niles Pease (1838–1921); Acting	March 11, 1909	March 15, 1909	4 days	Republican	City Council; President acting as mayor
27	William Stephens (1859–1944)	March 15, 1909	March 26, 1909	11 days	Republican	App.
28	George Alexander (1839–1923)	March 26, 1909	July 1, 1913	4 years, 97 days	Republican	Mar. 1909
28	George Alexander (1839–1923)	March 26, 1909	July 1, 1913	4 years, 97 days	Republican	Nov. 1909
28	George Alexander (1839–1923)	March 26, 1909	July 1, 1913	4 years, 97 days	Republican	1911
29	Henry H. Rose (1856–1923)	July 1, 1913	July 1, 1915	2 years, 0 days	Independent	1913
30	Charles E. Sebastian (1873–1929)	July 1, 1915	September 2, 1916 (Note: Sebastian resigned due to proven accusations of "illicit relations with young ladies" and extortion. Sebastian responded to the accusations with a staged attempt on his life, but the scheme was revealed and Sebastian resigned.)	1 year, 63 days	Democratic	1915
–	Martin F. Betkouski (1860–1942); Acting	September 2, 1916	September 5, 1916	3 days	Democratic	City Council; President acting as mayor
31	Frederic T. Woodman (1871–1949)	September 5, 1916	July 1, 1919	2 years, 299 days	Republican	App.
31	Frederic T. Woodman (1871–1949)	September 5, 1916	July 1, 1919	2 years, 299 days	Republican	1917
(23)	Meredith P. Snyder (1859–1937); 3rd time	July 1, 1919	July 1, 1921	2 years, 0 days	Democratic	1919
32	George E. Cryer (1875–1961)	July 1, 1921	July 1, 1929	8 years, 0 days	Republican	1921
32	George E. Cryer (1875–1961)	July 1, 1921	July 1, 1929	8 years, 0 days	Republican	1923
32	George E. Cryer (1875–1961)	July 1, 1921	July 1, 1929	8 years, 0 days	Republican	1925
33	John Clinton Porter (1871–1959)	July 1, 1929	July 1, 1933	4 years, 0 days	Democratic	1929
34	Frank L. Shaw (1877–1958)	July 1, 1933	September 26, 1938 (Note: Shaw was recalled and Bowron elected to replace him in a special election.)	5 years, 87 days	Republican	1933
34	Frank L. Shaw (1877–1958)	July 1, 1933	September 26, 1938	5 years, 87 days	Republican	1937
35	Fletcher Bowron (1887–1968)	September 26, 1938	July 1, 1953	14 years, 278 days	Republican	1938 recall
35	Fletcher Bowron (1887–1968)	September 26, 1938	July 1, 1953	14 years, 278 days	Republican	1941
35	Fletcher Bowron (1887–1968)	September 26, 1938	July 1, 1953	14 years, 278 days	Republican	1945
35	Fletcher Bowron (1887–1968)	September 26, 1938	July 1, 1953	14 years, 278 days	Republican	1949
36	Norris Poulson (1895–1982)	July 1, 1953	July 1, 1961	8 years, 0 days	Republican	1953
36	Norris Poulson (1895–1982)	July 1, 1953	July 1, 1961	8 years, 0 days	Republican	1957
37	Sam Yorty (1909–1998)	July 1, 1961	July 1, 1973	12 years, 0 days	Democratic	1961
37	Sam Yorty (1909–1998)	July 1, 1961	July 1, 1973	12 years, 0 days	Democratic	1965
37	Sam Yorty (1909–1998)	July 1, 1961	July 1, 1973	12 years, 0 days	Democratic	1969
38	Tom Bradley (1917–1998)	July 1, 1973	July 1, 1993	20 years, 0 days	Democratic	1973
38	Tom Bradley (1917–1998)	July 1, 1973	July 1, 1993	20 years, 0 days	Democratic	1977
38	Tom Bradley (1917–1998)	July 1, 1973	July 1, 1993	20 years, 0 days	Democratic	1981
38	Tom Bradley (1917–1998)	July 1, 1973	July 1, 1993	20 years, 0 days	Democratic	1985
38	Tom Bradley (1917–1998)	July 1, 1973	July 1, 1993	20 years, 0 days	Democratic	1989
39	Richard Riordan (1930–2023)	July 1, 1993	July 1, 2001	8 years, 0 days	Republican	1993
39	Richard Riordan (1930–2023)	July 1, 1993	July 1, 2001	8 years, 0 days	Republican	1997
40	James Hahn (born 1950)	July 1, 2001	July 1, 2005	4 years, 0 days	Democratic	2001
41	Antonio Villaraigosa (born 1953)	July 1, 2005	July 1, 2013	8 years, 0 days	Democratic	2005
41	Antonio Villaraigosa (born 1953)	July 1, 2005	July 1, 2013	8 years, 0 days	Democratic	2009
42	Eric Garcetti (born 1971)	July 1, 2013	December 12, 2022 (Note: Due to a change in the city's election calendar to align mayoral elections with statewide elections, Garcetti's second term was longer than the usual four years.)	9 years, 163 days	Democratic	2013
42	Eric Garcetti (born 1971)	July 1, 2013	December 12, 2022	9 years, 163 days	Democratic	2017
43	Karen Bass (born 1953)	December 12, 2022	Incumbent	3 years, 329 days	Democratic	2022
44	Nithya Raman (born 1981)	Due to take office December 14, 2026		−38 days	Democratic	2026

== Appendices ==
=== Mayoral terms and term limits ===
At the office's creation in 1850, mayors served one year terms. In 1889, the dates were changed to be on even-numbered years, with the term extending to two years per term; the first election in an even-numbered year was in 1892. In 1909, the city charter changed the election years to odd-numbered years with the March 1909 election, originally slated to be a recall election against Arthur C. Harper. In 1993, voters amended the city charter to implement term limits to elected officials, including mayor. In 2015, voters passed a charter amendment that would change the election dates to align with gubernatorial and presidential elections on even-numbered years; the first mayoral election after this change was in 2022.

Year	Term	Term limit	Years	Mayor(s) affected
1850	1 year	Unlimited	Unlimited	Alpheus P. Hodges to John Bryson
1889	2 years	Unlimited	Unlimited	Henry T. Hazard to William Stephens
1909	4 years	Unlimited	Unlimited	George Alexander to Meredith P. Snyder
1925	4 years	2 terms	8 years	George E. Cryer and his successors

=== Interrupted terms ===
Eight mayors have had interrupted terms: Stephen Clark Foster (1855 and 1856), Henry Mellus (1860), Cristobal Aguilar (1867), Frederick A. MacDougall (1878), John Bryson (1889), Arthur C. Harper (1909), Charles E. Sebastian (1916), and Frank L. Shaw (1938).

Interrupted terms of Los Angeles's elected mayors
Elected mayor	Last elected	End of service	Interim successor	Election	Elected successor	Reason
Stephen Clark Foster	1854	January 13, 1855	Manuel Requena	1855	Stephen Clark Foster	Resigned from office.
Stephen Clark Foster	1856	September 22, 1856	Manuel Requena	1856	John G. Nichols	Resigned from office.
Henry Mellus	1860	December 26, 1860	Wallace Woodworth	1861	Damien Marchesseault	Died in office.
Cristobal Aguilar	1866	May 8, 1867	None	1867	Damien Marchesseault	Unseated from office.
Frederick A. MacDougall	1877	November 16, 1878	Bernard Cohn	None	Bernard Cohn	Died in office.
John Bryson	1888	February 25, 1889	None	1889	Henry T. Hazard	Change in election dates.
Arthur C. Harper	1906	March 11, 1909	John D. Works; William Stephens	1909	George Alexander	Resigned from office.
Charles E. Sebastian	1915	September 2, 1916	Martin F. Betkouski	1917	Frederic T. Woodman	Resigned from office.
Frank L. Shaw	1917	September 26, 1938	None	1938	Fletcher Bowron	Recalled from office.

== See also ==
- Mayor of Los Angeles
- History of Los Angeles
- Pueblo de Los Angeles
- Los Angeles Pobladores
