= Claudio López =

Claudio López may refer to:

- Claudio López (mayor) (1767-1833), pre-statehood Alcade-Mayor of Los Angeles
- Claudio López Bru (1853–1925), Catalan businessman and philanthropist
- Claudio López (footballer) (born 1974), Argentine footballer
