= Elijah Moulton =

American politician

Member of the Los Angeles Common Council At-large
- In office May 09, 1860 – May 07, 1861
- Preceded by: T.B. Collins and William H. Peterson
- Succeeded by: James Edwards and Wallace Woodworth
- Constituency: At-large

Personal details
- Born: November 26, 1820 Montreal, Quebec
- Died: January 28, 1902 (aged 81) Los Angeles, California
- Spouse: Daughter of (d. 1861)
- Children: 3
- Parents: Elijah Moulton (father); Jane O'Farrell (mother)
- Occupation: Rancher, landowner, public official

Military service
- Allegiance: United States
- Battles/wars: Mexican–American War

Elijah Moulton (1820–1902) was a pioneer settler in Los Angeles, California, after the Mexican–American War, and became one of its wealthiest citizens. He was a member of the city's governing body, the Common Council.

== Personal ==
Moulton was born in Montreal, Quebec, on November 26, 1820, the son of Elijah Moulton of Massachusetts and Jane O'Farrell of Connecticut.

Moulton in 1845 joined a westward-bound expedition organized by mountain man Jim Bridger and arrived in Los Angeles on May 12 of that year. After settling in Los Angeles, he bought land near that of William Wolfskill, and in 1855 he took charge of Wolfskill's property, and later he married one of Wolfskill's daughters. She had one child, both she and the baby dying in 1861.

Moulton's will at probate stated that he was not married, but that he had three living children—two daughters, Marie L. (later Rodriguez) and Sacramenta, and a son, Manuel. The mother of the children, named Juana, died in 1899.

In 1898 he became a member of the Pioneers of Los Angeles, which limited its membership to those who were born outside of California and who had lived in Los Angeles for at least twenty-five years.

Moulton, by this time considered "wealthy," died on January 28, 1902, at the age of 81; he was labeled the "oldest pioneer in Los Angeles in point of residence." Mourners gathered in the home he had built sixty years previous at the corner of Alhambra Avenue and Daly Street (Alhambra Avenue formerly ran along the right-of-way now used exclusively by Southern Pacific, from Main & Alameda to approximately Mission and Main. The location of the adobe is now underneath the 5 freeway, near the corner of Daly & Luisa Sts.).

Even with the brick addition, which is larger than the original adobe, the rooms could hold but a small part of the sorrowing friends. ... The late pioneer had just about completed building a fine residence a block away, but he did not live to occupy it, and yesterday he was borne from the scenes of his life for over half a century.

"The services were spiritualistic, in accordance with the belief of the deceased," and the address and prayer were made by Maude L. Freitag. A procession which followed the bier to the cemetery was two blocks in length.

== Military ==
During the Mexican–American War, which began in 1845, Moulton "preceded and later joined" the California Battalion of John C. Fremont, "being sent with ten others to garrison Santa Barbara. This squad was driven out during the "rebellion of 1846," and went north with Indians to the head of the San Joaquin Valley. Moulton and his companions joined Fremont at Monterey and returned to Los Angeles a year later. He was present at the Mexican capitulation at the Cahuenga Pass.

According to pioneer historian Harris Newmark, Moulton's hardships during the war:

were far severer than those which tested the grit of the average emigrant; and Moulton in better days often told how, when nearly driven to starvation, he and a comrade had actually used a remnant of the Stars and Stripes as a seine with which to fish, and so saved their lives.

== Vocation ==
Moulton left his Canadian home as a youth and became a trapper all across the continent.

After his military service, he settled permanently in East Los Angeles in 1847 to raise cattle and sheep. Moulton was the first deputy sheriff of Los Angeles County, hired around 1850 by the first sheriff, George T. Burrill. He then went to work for Don Louis Vignes, the first commercial wine maker in California

In 1860 Moulton himself had 5,000 fruit-bearing grapevines. "He had a dairy, for a while," Newmark wrote, "and peddled milk from a can or two carried in a wagon."

== Common Council ==
Moulton was elected to the Los Angeles Common Council, the governing body of that city, for a term beginning May 9, 1860, and ending May 7, 1861. During rainy weather and a flood in 1859–60, the Los Angeles River was so deep that nobody could cross it on foot, so the next year, when Moulton was on the Common Council, he used his influence to successfully lobby for a footbridge across the river, the first such crossing ever constructed.

== Legacy ==
Around 1886 he sold his land to the Southern Pacific Railroad, which built its shop facilities there at the turn of the century.

Moulton's estate was probated in February 1902 and was valued at cash, $5,750; notes, $11,000; stock in the Los Angeles Brewing Company, $1,000; and real estate at $14,500, including thirty-two acres in his subdivision east of the Los Angeles River. His children shared his estate equally.

In 1904 "One of the most notable recent sales on the East Side was that of the Elijah Moulton estate to the Edison Electric Company of three acres extending from the Edison electric plant and including what has been known as 'The Swamp' or 'The Jungle.'"

Moulton Avenue in Lincoln Heights, Los Angeles, just north of his old ranch, was named after him.
