= Manuel Requena =

Californio politician (1802–1876)

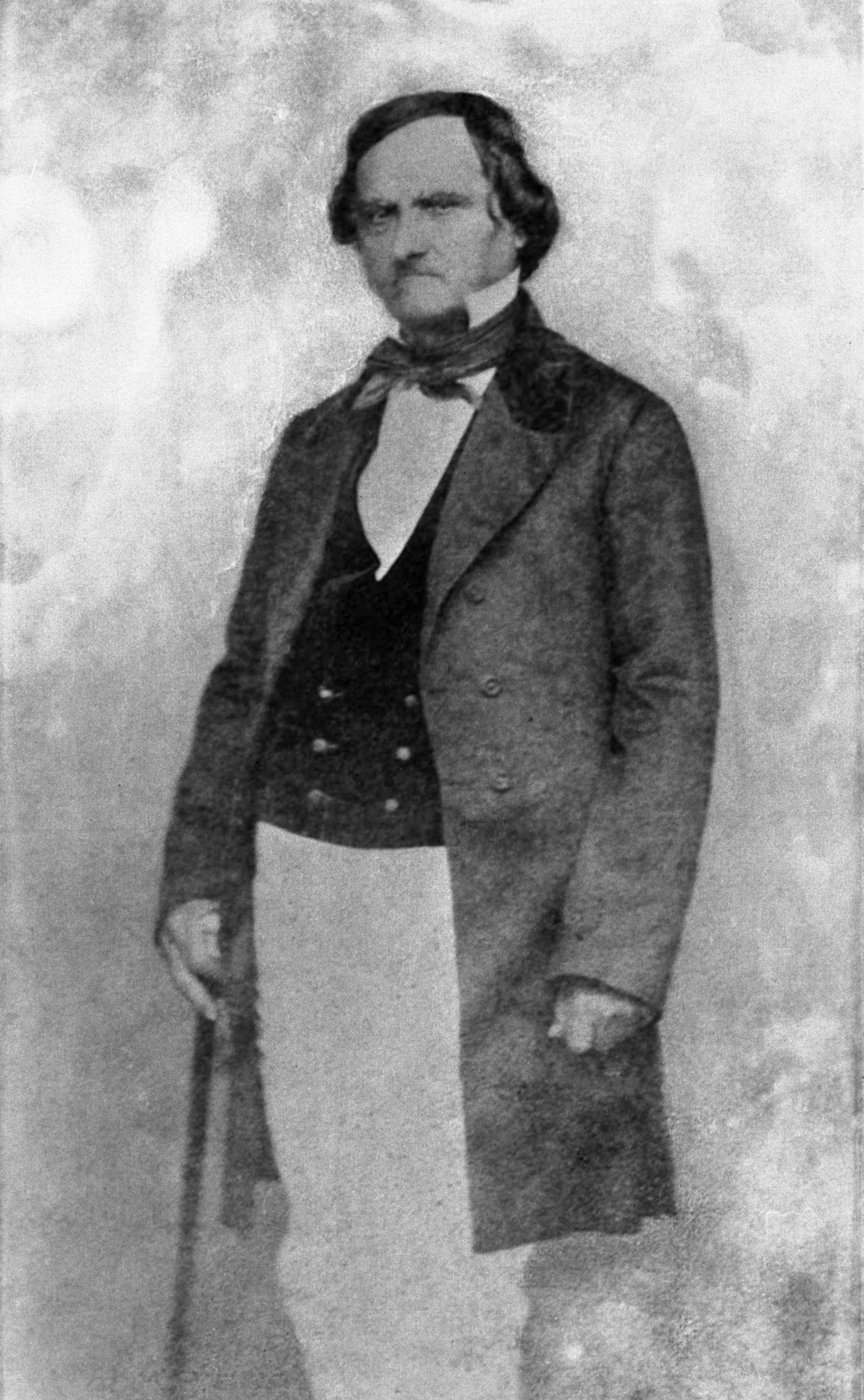
- Portrait photo of Manuel Requena

Acting Mayor of Los Angeles
- In office September 22, 1856 – October 4, 1856
- Preceded by: Stephen Clark Foster
- Succeeded by: John G. Nichols

Personal details
- Born: 1802 Yucatán, Mexico
- Died: 1876 (aged 73–74)
- Party: Republican

Manuel Requena (1802–1876) was a Yucatán-born Californio politician who served multiple terms as Alcalde of Los Angeles (Mayor of Los Angeles). Requena became active in Los Angeles politics in the 1830s, during the Mexican era, and continued serving after the American Conquest of California until his death in the 1850s. He was the first Republican mayor of Los Angeles.

== Early life ==
Requena was born in 1802 in the Mexican state of Yucatán, where he grew up and went on to become a successful merchant. In 1834 he moved to Los Angeles, where he quickly became an important business and political figure for the Mexican government.

== Political career ==
=== Mexican California ===
At one point, Requena, who was accorded the honorific Don, was appointed an election judge, but he declined, citing ill health.

The ayuntamiento was about to accept it when someone reported that Don Manuel was engaged in pruning his vineyard, whereupon a committee of investigation was appointed, with Juan Temple, merchant, as medical expert. The committee and the improvised doctor examined Don Manuel, and reported that his indisposition did not prevent him from pruning, but would incapacitate him from serving as a judge of the election.

Requena was first alcalde, which was equivalent to the position of mayor, during the last years of Los Angeles under Mexican rule.

In April 1836, a force of vigilantes demanded that he cooperate with them in turning over the key to a house where fugitive Maria del Rosario Villa, accused of murdering her husband, was staying. He replied, in Spanish,

Maria del Rosario Villa is incarcerated at a private dwelling, whose owner has the key, with instructions not to deliver the same to any one. The prisoner is left there at the disposition of the law only. God and liberty.

Nevertheless, the vigilantes, who had previously executed Rosario Villa's paramour, seized her and shot her. That was, wrote historian J.M. Guinn, "the only instance in the seventy-five years of Spanish and Mexican rule in California, of the people, by popular tribunal, taking the administration of justice out of the hands of the legally constituted authorities.

=== American California ===
When the Los Angeles Common Council (which preceded the Los Angeles City Council) was formed in 1850 after Los Angeles was incorporated as an American town, Requena became one of its charter members. He served during the periods of 1850—1854, 1856 (when as council president, he also served briefly as acting mayor), and 1864—1868.

Requena was elected to the first Los Angeles County Board of Supervisors in 1852. In 1854, he became a trustee in the city's first board of education.

Preceded by Manuel Dominguez and Antonio F. Coronel (as Justices of the Peace)	First Alcalde of Los Angeles, Alta California; 1844—1845	Succeeded by Vicente Sánchez
Preceded by None	Los Angeles County Board of Supervisors; 4th district 1852—1853	Succeeded by Daniel M. Thomas
