= José Mascarel =

American politician (1816–1899)

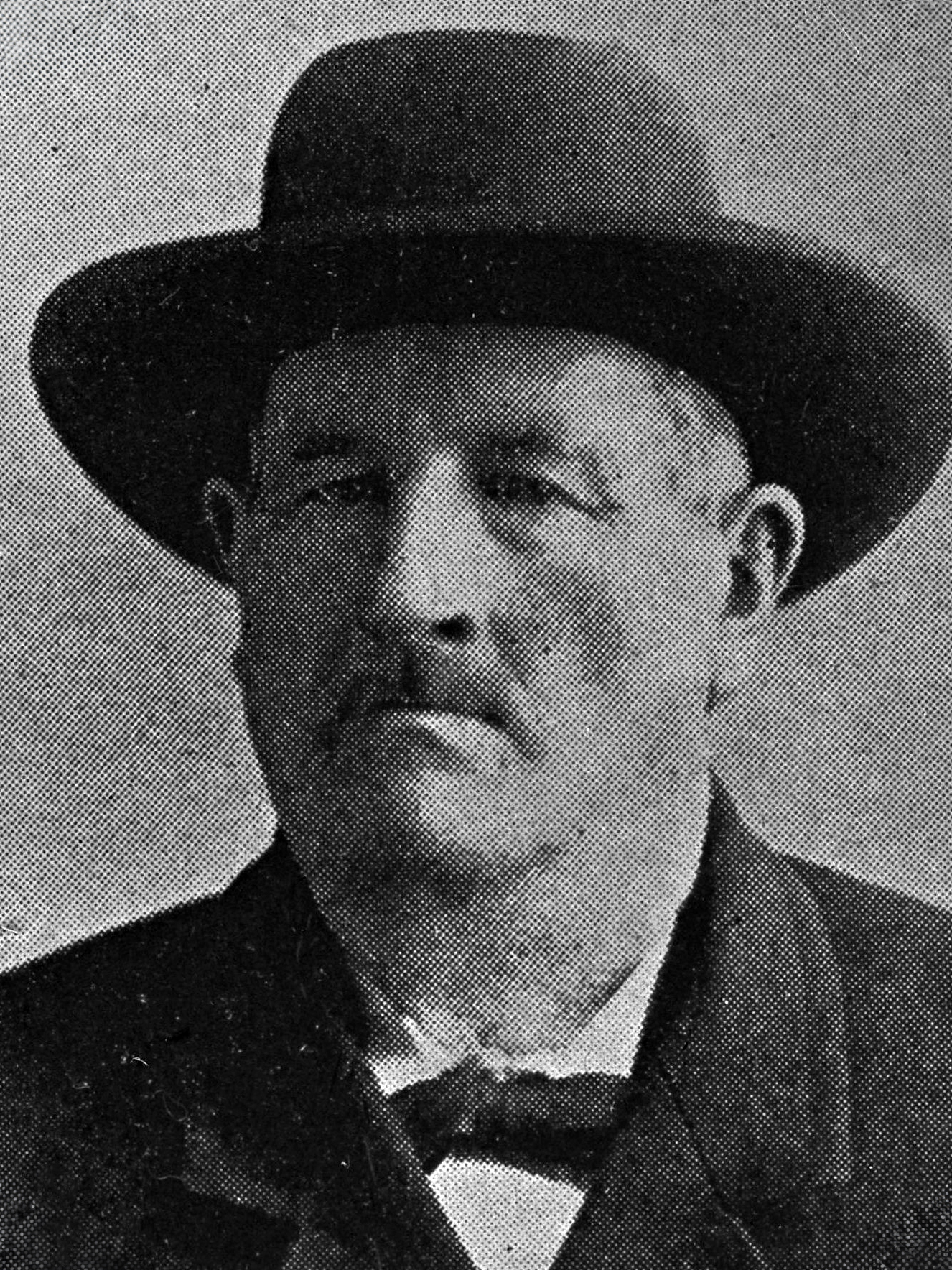

9th Mayor of Los Angeles
- In office May 5, 1865 – May 10, 1866
- Preceded by: Damien Marchesseault
- Succeeded by: Cristóbal Aguilar

Personal details
- Born: April 18, 1816 Marseille, France
- Died: October 6, 1899 (aged 83) Los Angeles, California, US

José Mascarel (April 18, 1816 – October 6, 1899) was a 19th−century sea captain, California landowner, investor, baker, and vintner; and a mayor of Los Angeles, California.

== Personal ==
=== Birth and death ===
Mascarel was born in Marseille on April 18, 1816 as Joseph Mascarel. He died of heart failure on October 6, 1899, at the age of 83 in his home at 615 Ducommun Street in Los Angeles. A solemn high mass was scheduled for the Old Plaza Church, with interment following at the Catholic Calvary Cemetery in East Los Angeles. He was at his death the "[second-]oldest foreigner in Los Angeles, if not in California," after Elijah Moulton. It was not uncommon in the mid-1800's for immigrants arriving in Southern California to be baptized and to take a Spanish-Christian name, and Mascarel was known as José throughout the balance of his life in Los Angeles.

=== Marriages ===
Mascarel's first marriage was in 1844 to Sevilda, a local indigenous woman, in the Pueblo de Los Ángeles in Alta California. They had nine children, Charles, Jose Jr., Constance, Hortense, Marie Larquier, Josephine Twist, Margarita Drouet, Adele Kracke, and Eugenie Hoover. She died in 1890.

However, "In spite of the opposition of relatives," the Los Angeles Times noted, Mascarel married Maria Jesus Benite Feliz on June 4, 1896, in a "quiet but romantic wedding" to "the woman who for thirty long years has been, to all intents and purposes," his wife. The Times added:

There was an attempt made to prevent the issuance of a marriage license to Mr. Mascarel, but it proved futile, as the law does not require a license to render the marriage valid in a case like this. . . . The desire to have the union made legal was brought about by the failing health of Mrs. Mascarel, who, although twenty years younger than her aged husband, is still a woman far advanced in years.

This second marriage produced one daughter, Maria Librada (aka Mary Lillian) Mascarel.

=== Personality ===
In an 1899 talk before the Historical Society of Southern California, Los Angeles historian H.D. Barrows noted that Mascarel was "physically of stalwart proportions, being over six feet in height and weighing over 200 pounds." Another contemporary, Horace Bell, recalled in 1881 that Mascarel was a "giant . . . with a great grizzly grip."

Barrows told his audience that:

While Mr. Mascarel was naturally of a retiring disposition, including [sic] him to shun publicity, he was in many respects a remarkable man. He had clear-cut and eminently practical views, strong convictions and a sound judgment in business matters, which enabled him to accumulate a handsome fortune, though he gave away for charitable and other purposes, considerable sums during his lifetime. His charities, which in his later years amounted to several hundred dollars a month, were, as a rule, unknown to outsiders, i.e., to any one except himself and the beneficiaries.

Barrows noted that Mascarel "spoke French and Spanish, but like so many natives of France who came to California, he was never quite able to master the English language."

When General Irwin McDowell was commander of the army on this coast, after the close of the civil war, he made Los Angeles a visit, and our people were anxious to have him receive due honors by the Mayor, which office was at the time filled by Mr. Mascarel; and they feared his unfamiliarity with the English language might cause embarrassment. But as it happened, General McDowell spoke French fluently, and so the official courtesies between him and the Mayor passed off felicitously.

=== Legacy ===
When Mascarel died, his estate was estimated to be worth a million dollars, but a later probate determined the sum to be "no more than $500,000 or $600,000. The difference may be accounted for that in his later years the old man got into the habit of deeding away his property to his loving friends until it was somewhat reduced," the Los Angeles Times reported. "A dozen or fifteen suits in this county and Santa Barbara county" were opened "to recover the property that deceased had deeded away so generously. when the will was challenged by three of his children [from his first wife]—Constance M. Goytino, Hortense Mascarel and Sylvester Mascarel. . . . volley after volley of allegations of murky fraud and deceit were fired back and forth . . . until the situation had become very complicated."

The settlement gave one-fourth of the estate to Mrs. Goytino, one-fourth to Hortense Mascarel and the remaining half to six grandchildren (said to be the "offsprings of a deceased sister"), "after $5 has first been given to the widow, Mrs. Mascarel; $2400 to Hortense Mascarel and to Mrs. Goytino, and $100 to Sylvester Mascarel." The children waived all claims to any of the property that Mascarel deeded to anyone else while he was alive. Mascarel had "provided for his wife before he died, and assigned her certain mortgages aggregating about $24,000, besides valuable property." It was agreed that the children would refund to investor Max Goldschmidt the sum of $25,000 he had paid for the Hotel Mascarel property in Santa Barbara in return for his giving them the deed to the hotel.

== Vocation ==
When José Mascarel was eleven years old, he shipped out on a French merchant ship, and at age 21 he joined the French Navy for four years.

In about the year 1840, he sailed from Gibraltar for Valparaíso. In passing Cape Horn he had both feet frozen, from which he was ill when he arrived at Valparaíso. After recovering his health[,] Captain Mascarel engaged in coasting trade off the western coast of South America, he and another party having purchased a vessel, a Chilean schooner, La Joven Fanita.

Mascarel sold the vessel to Joseph Yves Limantour but remained aboard as captain while trading on the California coast. In 1845 they arrived at San Pedro in Alta California, where Mascarel debarked and made his way to settle in the Pueblo de Los Ángeles. He went to work as a cooper for Luis Vignes and then, with "two Manon brothers" started a bakery.

Mascarel was noted as a man "largely instrumental in building up" early Los Angeles. He owned property "in the very midst of the city's wholesale district" and in San Bernardino, Riverside, Ventura, and Santa Barbara Counties.

=== Public service ===
Mascarel was a member of the Los Angeles Common Council in 1864–65, and he was again elected on November 12, 1866, to succeed Moritz Morris, who had resigned the previous month. He served also on the council in 1867 (his position was declared vacant on August 19 of that year, but he was reelected on September 2), in 1868–69 and in 1869–70 (he resigned on January 13, 1870). After the council was reformatted from an at-large representation to one based on electoral districts, he was elected to represent the 2nd Ward in 1873–74, 1874–75, 1880–81 and 1881–82.

Mascarel was a supporter of the Union government during the American Civil War, and helped to overcome a "strong secessionist movement" in Los Angeles at that time.

Mayor

He served one term as the Mayor of Los Angeles, from May 5, 1865, to May 10, 1866. He was also a member of the Fire Commission.

During his mayoral term, he wanted to include the prohibition of weapons in the city. During the municipal campaign in 1866, a local newspaper wrote: "Wanted: a candidate for Mayor who can read and speak the English language." In 1871, he invested in the Farmers and Merchants Bank of Los Angeles with Isaias W. Hellman and Charles Ducommun. In 1874 he acquired a store on Gower Street west of Los Angeles, which in 1886 became the city of Hollywood.

== References and notes ==
Access to the Los Angeles Times links may require the use of a library card.
