= Alpheus P. Hodges =

American politician in California

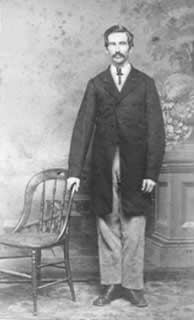

1st Mayor of Los Angeles
- In office July 1, 1850 – May 7, 1851
- Preceded by: Ygnacio del Valle (pre-statehood)
- Succeeded by: Benjamin Davis Wilson

Personal details
- Born: 1821 Virginia, U.S.
- Died: July 29, 1858 Alexandria, Virginia, U.S.

Alpheus P. Hodges (1821 – July 29, 1858) was the first mayor of Los Angeles, California after the city was incorporated on April 4, 1850. However, he was preceded by Stephen C. Foster, who was the first mayor under American rule.

== Biography ==
Alpheus was born in 1821, and was from Richmond, Virginia. In 1844 he graduated in one of the first classes of the Medical College of Virginia, now part of Virginia Commonwealth University in Richmond, VA. His name is on the 1844 graduating records as A.P.Hodges. On April 3, 1849, he left Richmond aboard Madison Mining and Trading Company's ship, the Glenmore, under command of Captain W.P. Poythress, and traveled to San Francisco. He's listed on the manifest as Hodges, A.P., M.D.

Within a year of arriving in California, he served as both the mayor and Coroner of Los Angeles, California from 1850 to 1851. At that time, the population of the city was only 1,610. He became mayor of the new city at age 28 and the youngest mayor of Los Angeles. He served as mayor for only a year, that being the term of the office at that time.

He later returned to Virginia, and died in Alexandria at the home of his father on July 29, 1858. He was aged 36 years and ten months.
