= Francis Mellus =

American politician

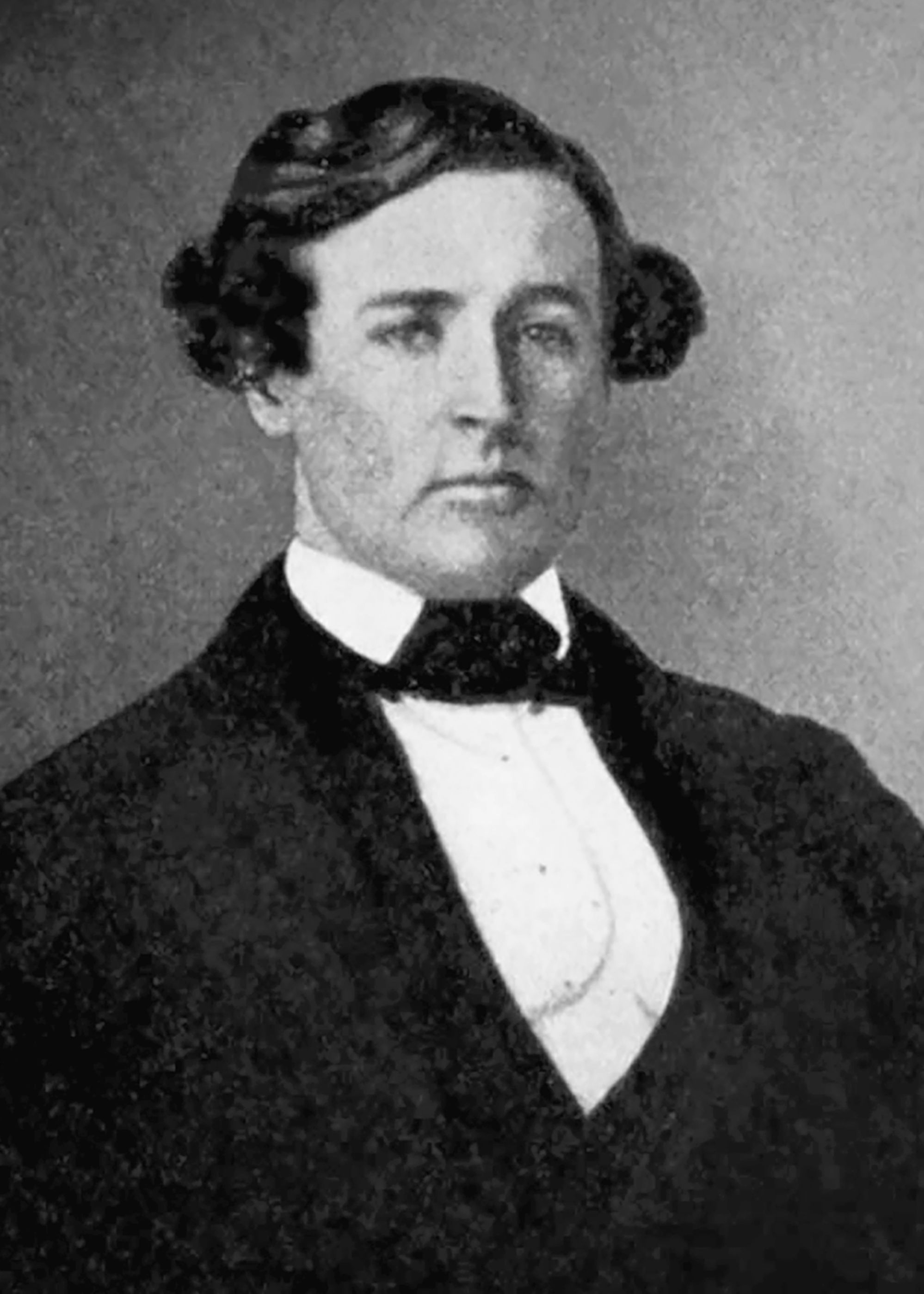

Member of the California State Assembly from the 1st district
- In office January 1, 1855 – January 7, 1856
- Preceded by: Charles P. Noell
- Succeeded by: John G. Downey

Personal details
- Born: February 3, 1824 Salem, Massachusetts
- Died: September 14, 1864 (aged 40) Los Angeles, California
- Party: Whig
- Relatives: Henry Mellus (brother)

Francis Mellus (February 3, 1824 – September 14, 1864) was a Los Angeles County Supervisor and a successful California business man.

== California ==
Mellus, the brother of Henry Mellus, was born in Salem, Massachusetts. In 1839 he came to San Francisco in Mexican Alta California, and was employed as clerk by his brother Henry. As noted in his journal, he worked for a Mr. Thompson for at least 3 years.

Francis Mellus bought hides for this company along the coast of California, taking the goods by sailing ship to San Diego, where they were dried, and when a sufficient quantity was collected to fill a trading ship, usually took a couple of years' time, Mellus sent the goods to the East Coast.

=== Los Angeles ===
After 11 years of that work he came to Los Angeles, where he entered the general merchandise business with David W. Alexander, under the firm name of Alexander & Mellus. Francis married Adelaida Johnson (the daughter of James (Santiago) Johnson and a sister of Henry Mellus's wife Anita). James J. Mellus was the son of Francis Mellus.

Francis Mellus was elected to the Los Angeles Common Council, the governing body of the city, on May 1, 1854. He was chosen to be council president. Mellus resigned from the council on December 8, 1854.

Mellus was a member of the California State Assembly, representing 1st Assembly District, from 1855 to 1856. In 1858 he was elected to the Los Angeles County Board of Supervisors.

After the ending his partnership with Alexander in 1863, Francis Mellus was representative for the Wells Fargo Express Company until his death in 1864.

Francis Mellus' widow, Adelaida Mellus, married his partner Alexander in 1864.
