= Mariano Verdugo =

Spanish soldier and mayor

Mariano de la Luz Verdugo (1746 – 1822) was a Spanish soldier and later Mayor of the Pueblo of Los Angeles.

== Biography ==
Mariano de la Luz Verdugo was born at San Javier, Baja California, to Juan Diego Verdugo and María Ignacia de la Concepción Carrillo. Mariano Verdugo came to California with his brother, José María Verdugo, in the 1769 Rivera expedition and, for the next two decades, served at various presidios in California. Mariano Verdugo was promoted to the rank of corporal and placed in command of the guard at Mission San Luis Obispo in 1773. In 1781, he was elevated to sergeant and put in charge of the Monterey Presidio. In 1782, when Governor Felipe de Neve's expedition headed back to Mexico via the Colorado River, Verdugo led the military escort of the return trip.

In 1784, Spanish governor Pedro Fages granted grazing rights to Rancho Portezuela, near present day Universal City, to Mariano de la Luz Verdugo. Rancho Portezuela was reclaimed by the Mission San Fernando in 1810. Verdugo retired to Los Angeles around 1787, and served as alcalde of the Pueblo in 1790 - 1791 and 1802 - 1808. Mariano married Maria Guadalupe Lugo (–1780) at Mission San Carlos Borromeo de Carmelo in 1775. After Guadalupe Lugo died in San Diego in 1780, Verdugo married Maria Gertrudis Gregoria Espinosa (1760–1830) in 1788. Their daughter, Maria del Rosaria Verdugo (1793-), married Francisco Avila in 1810.
