= Cristobal Aguilar =

American politician

Cristóbal Aguilar
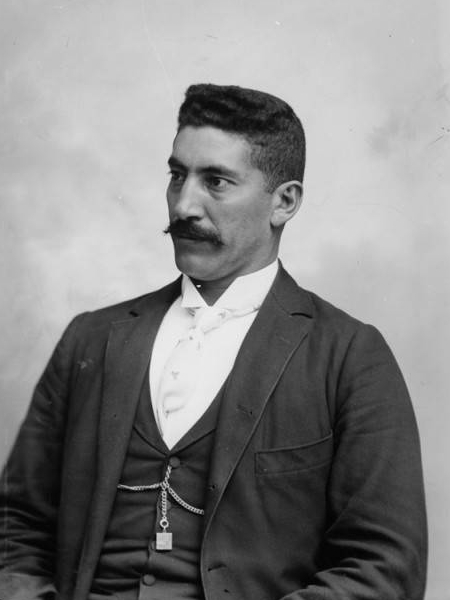

10th Mayor of Los Angeles
- In office May 10, 1866 – May 8, 1867
- Preceded by: José Mascarel
- Succeeded by: Damien Marchesseault
- In office August 8, 1867 – December 7, 1868
- Preceded by: Damien Marchesseault
- Succeeded by: Joel Turner
- In office December 9, 1870 – December 5, 1872
- Preceded by: Joel Turner
- Succeeded by: James R. Toberman

Personal details
- Born: José Cristóbal Aguilar; 1816 Alta California, Viceroyalty of New Spain (now California, U.S.)
- Died: April 11, 1886 (aged 69–70) East Los Angeles, California
- Spouse: Maria Dolores Yorba (m. 1848)
- Relations: José Antonio Yorba (father in-law)

José Cristóbal Aguilar (1816 – April 11, 1886) was a Californio politician and journalist, who served three terms as Mayor of Los Angeles, the last Hispanic to hold the office until 2005, with the election of Antonio Villaraigosa.

== Background ==
Aguilar was born on 1816, in Alta California, Viceroyalty of New Spain (now California, U.S.), to parents Jose María Aguilar and María Ygnacia Elizalde. The Aguilars lived in an adobe facing the Los Angeles Plaza on what is now North Main Street. This house was a prominent landmark that later served as the town calabozo, or jail, and then as the town's first hospital, in 1858.

On October 31, 1848, Aguilar married Maria Dolores Yorba at the San Gabriel Mission. His wife was the daughter of José Antonio de los Remidios Yorba and María Catalina Verdugo. The Yorbas possessed vast land holdings including most of the Santa Ana Valley (in present-day Orange County, California). In the 1870 census, the Aguilars had four children living with them: Librada, 19; Jose M., 17; Matias, 12; Guadalupe, 10, and Rosa, 7.

Aguilar could not speak English, but, as reported by Los Angeles historian H.D. Barrows in 1899, he "made a good and acceptable Mayor because of the general familiarity of citizens of all nationalities then residing here, with the Spanish tongue."

== Political life ==
Aguilar "held prominent office under Mexican rule." After the transfer of California from Mexico to the United States, the Mexican ayuntamiento was abolished in favour of a city council system. A Democrat, Aguilar was elected to the new Los Angeles Common Council on July 1, 1850, and he served in 1850-51, 1855–56, 1858–59 and 1861-62. He was mayor of Los Angeles in 1866-67, 1867–68 and 1870-72.

Aguilar was elected to the Board of Supervisors three times, serving in 1854-56, 1860 and 1862-64.

Aguilar was first elected mayor on May 7, 1866. The election was certified three days later and he assumed office that same day. In that same year he signed an ordinance to set aside five acres of land as a "Public Square or Plaza, for the use and benefit of the Citizens in common," which land later was named Pershing Square.

Aguilar was unseated for three months in the middle of his first term and replaced by Damien Marchesseault. During that time he served as Zanjero of Los Angeles (water steward). With Los Angeles being in a Mediterranean climate and risks of both drought and flooding a constant threat, this position was actually considered more important than the mayor and paid the highest salary of any city official at the time. On August 8, 1867, Aguilar was reinstated as mayor and served the remainder of his term. His decision in 1868 to retain control over the city's water rights and reserves is considered one of the most important in Los Angeles' history.

In 1868, Aguilar lost re-election to Joel Turner and was subsequently appointed as zanjero once again.

Aguilar was elected mayor in 1870 over Andrew Glassell by a vote of 436 to 428, and he was installed despite a requested recount. He was defeated for reelection in 1872 by J.R. Toberman in a vote of 715 for Toberman and 350 for Aguilar. During that election, Toberman "made an issue" of Aguilar's "poor English."

Historian John P. Schmal noted that:

"When Aguilar became Mayor, there were less than 6,000 residents in the City. When the city council proposed selling off the city's water rights to bring in additional revenue, Aguilar vetoed the proposal. If Aguilar had not used his power of veto, Los Angeles would have lost control of its water rights, leading to serious problems at a later date."

In December 1873, Aguilar was again appointed as zanjero by a vote in the Common Council of 7-2 over T.H. Eaton. Aguilar served until December 5, 1878.

== Later years ==
After retiring from politics Aguilar wrote for La Cronica, the City's leading Spanish-language newspaper at the time. In the paper, he wrote a regular column on local community issues.

He died of a heart attack on April 11, 1886, at the age of 70. The Los Angeles Herald wrote of him in an obituary:

He was at one time a wealthy man and brought up a large family with much care, giving each a good education. Later he lost most of his property, as many others did, in the dark days of the municipality before there was a market for products of the soil. . . . He was getting on his horse to ride out and see to a water ditch, and fell back dead.

The funeral was at the Church of Our Lady the Queen of Angels.

Preceded by Stephen C. Foster	Los Angeles County Board of Supervisors; 2nd district 1854—1857	Succeeded by William M. Stockton
Preceded by Ralph Emerson	Los Angeles County Board of Supervisors; 2nd district 1860—1861	Succeeded by Morris S. Goodman
Preceded by Jesus Cruz	Zanjero of Los Angeles; May 23, 1867—August 8, 1867	Succeeded by Damien Marchesseault
Preceded by Charles Pleasant	Zanjero of Los Angeles; December 21, 1868—March 1, 1869	Succeeded by Charles Pleasant
Preceded by James H. Easton	Zanjero of Los Angeles; December 31, 1873—December 9, 1875	Succeeded by Unknown or Vacant
Preceded by Unknown or Vacant	Zanjero of Los Angeles; December 6, 1877—December 5, 1878	Succeeded by William P. Meinzer
