= Hazard Park =

Los Angeles municipal park established 1911

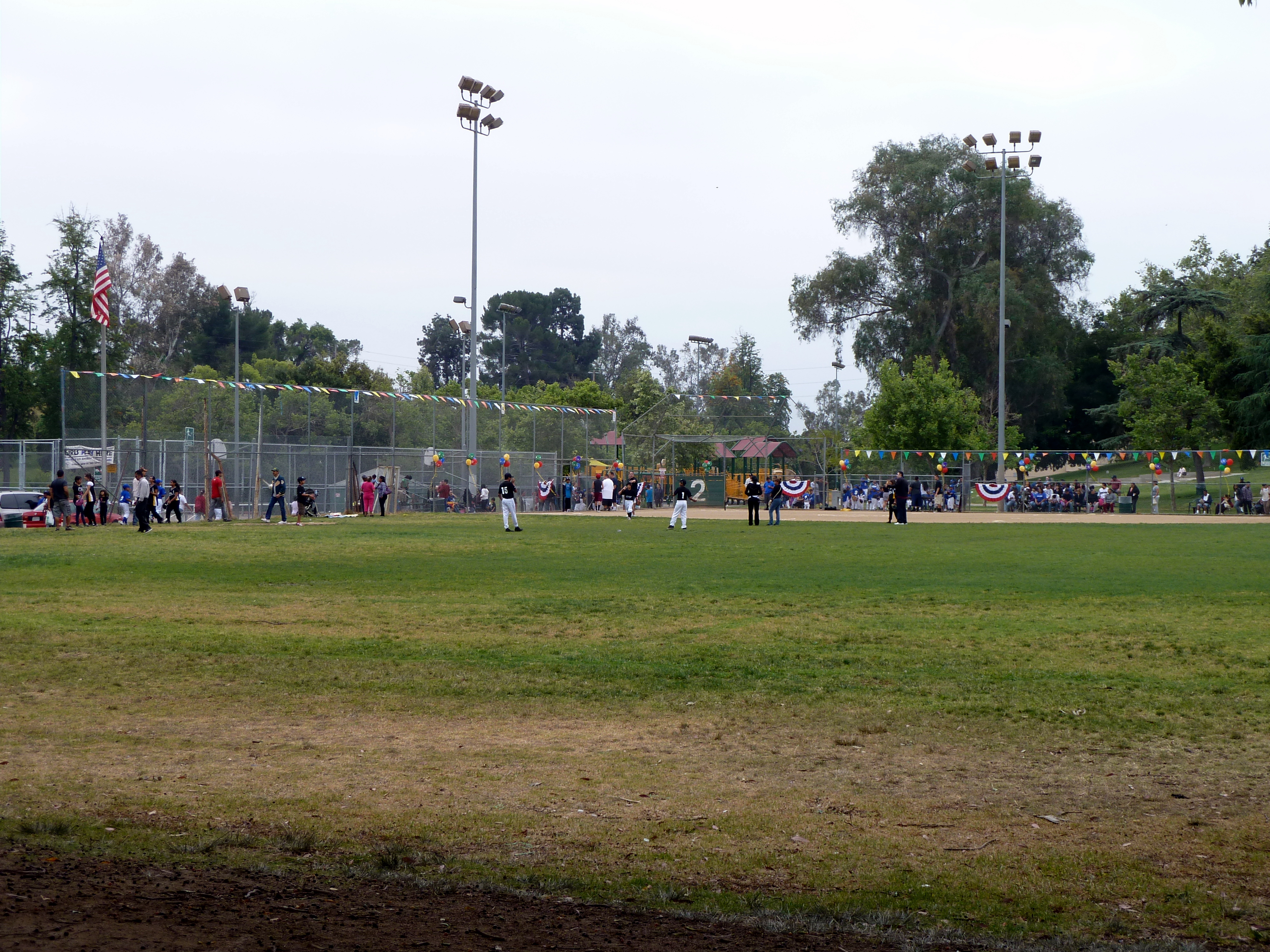
- Baseball at Hazard Park
- Interactive map of Hazard Park
- Type: Urban park
- Location: 2230 Norfolk Street, Boyle Heights, Los Angeles
- Coordinates: 34.059077°N 118.201969°W
- Area: 26.5 acres (10.7 ha)
- Operator: City of Los Angeles Department of Recreation and Parks
- Status: Open all year

Hazard Park is a 26.5-acre (10.7 ha) city park in Los Angeles, California. The park was named after Henry T. Hazard, the 20th mayor of Los Angeles.

The park is abutted by County+USC Medical Center and the Francisco Bravo Medical Magnet High School.

== History ==
Named after Henry T. Hazard A 2000-seat terraced grandstand opened in 1911 in the park, as did "the largest and best fitted playgrounds", divided into sections for boys and for girls.

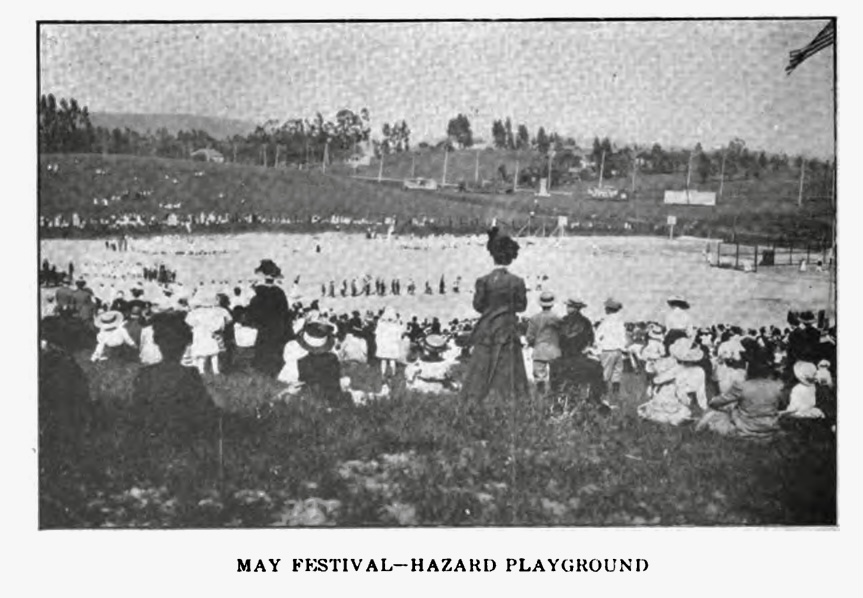
May Festival — Hazard Playground (Los Angeles Playground Commission annual report, 1912)

Beginning in 1962, a 1000-bed Veterans Administration (VA) hospital was planned to replace the park. The VA had proposed exchanging 16.5 acres (6.7 ha) of park land for the 21.8 acres (8.8 ha) at the VA property near Westwood. This proposal was met with opposition organized through the Save Hazard Park Association, which called the action "Robin Hoodism in reverse", since parkland in a poor Latino community would be exchanged for parkland in wealthier West Los Angeles. In 1966, the City Parks Commission voted in favor of the exchange, with general manager of the Recreation and Parks Department calling it a "good deal for the city". In the same year, Mayor Sam Yorty and the city council approved the exchange. The Association brought an injunction against the city, but it was denied in 1968. By 1969, Yorty ceded to the protest, asking the city council to repeal the plan. The Los Angeles Times said "the council and the mayor moved correctly, if belatedly", calling it a victory for the Association.

In May 1970, a celebration occurred at the park to celebrate the dropping of the eminent domain suit. The celebration included local artist Leo Politi, who had painted murals at the park during the protests.

In 2000, supporters lobbied for the inclusion of an adjacent 2 acres (0.81 ha) section of wetlands to be included in the park. The efforts were led by the Save Hazard Park Association, which renamed to Friends of Hazard Park and Hazard Park Wetlands.
