= Benjamin Davis Wilson =

American politician from California (1811–1878)

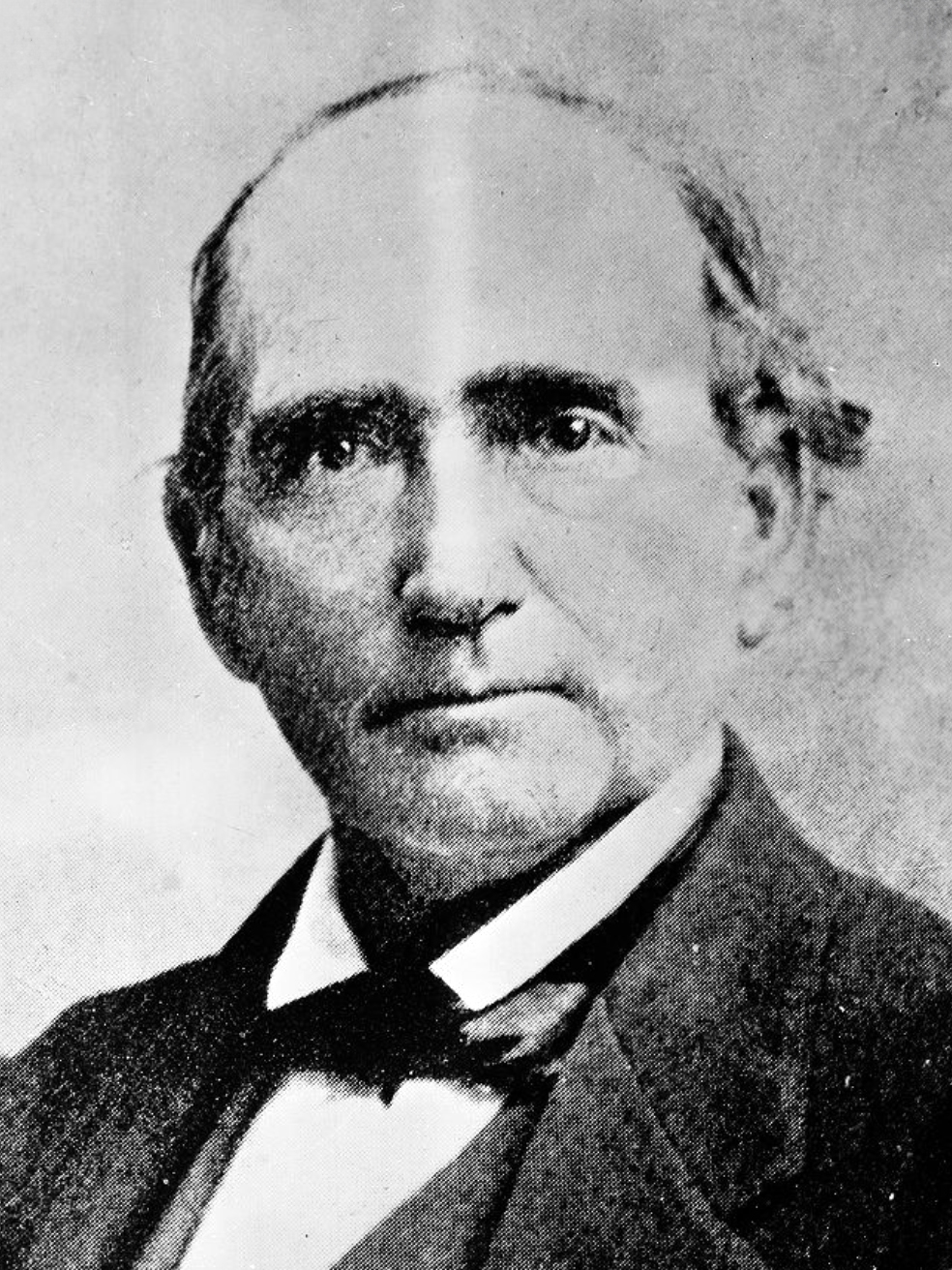

9th Chair of Los Angeles County
- In office December 3, 1861 – December 2, 1862
- Preceded by: Abel Stearns
- Succeeded by: Julius Morris

2nd Mayor of Los Angeles
- In office May 7, 1851 – May 4, 1852
- Preceded by: Alpheus P. Hodges
- Succeeded by: John G. Nichols

Personal details
- Born: December 1, 1811 Wilson County, Tennessee, U.S.
- Died: March 11, 1878 (aged 66) San Gabriel, California, U.S.
- Resting place: San Gabriel Cemetery, San Gabriel, California, U.S.
- Spouse(s): Ramona Yorba, Margaret Hereford
- Relations: George S. Patton (grandson)
- Children: 1
- Occupation: Statesman

Benjamin Davis Wilson (December 1, 1811 – March 11, 1878), commonly known as Don Benito Wilson, was an American-Mexican politician, fur trapper, and ranchero of California. Born in Tennessee to parents from Virginia, Wilson eventually settled in Alta California when it was part of the Republic of Mexico, and acquired Rancho Jurupa. He became a naturalized Mexican citizen and married into a prominent Californio family.

Following the American Conquest of California, Wilson acquired considerable other property, some from Mexicans struggling to retain their land grants. Having served on the Common Council of Los Angeles, he later was elected to a term as the second mayor of the city after California was admitted as a state.

== Life in California ==
=== Rancho Jurupa ===
At about the age of 30, Wilson came to California with the Workman-Rowland Party in 1841, which was seeking passage to China.

In 1842, Wilson bought a key portion of Rancho Jurupa from Juan Bandini, a section that was later named Rancho Rubidoux. Encompassing most of present-day Rubidoux, California, as well as a significant portion of downtown Riverside, California, Wilson became the first permanent settler in the Riverside area. In 1844 he married his first wife, Ramona Yorba, whose father Bernardo Yorba, was the prominent Spanish (Mexican) landholder of Rancho Cañón de Santa Ana.

Wilson gained a local reputation and was often asked to assist with Native American affairs. Wilson was appointed as Justice of the Peace of the Inland Territory.

=== Big Bear Lake ===
In 1845 Wilson was asked to pursue a group of Native Americans led by a man who had escaped from the San Gabriel Mission. They were stealing numerous horses from local ranchers. The Indians drove the horses, numbering in the thousands, up to the high desert near Lucerne. In his pursuit, Wilson sent 22 men through the Cajon Pass and led another 22 into the depths of the San Bernardino Mountains. According to Trafzer, the resident Serrano people let Wilson pass through their territory in pursuit of the raiders.

Wilson later sent his 22 men in pairs on a bear hunt, gathering 11 pelts. On their return trip to Rancho Jurupa, they gathered another 11 pelts. He named the place Big Bear Lake. The lake today is known as Baldwin Lake, after Elias J. "Lucky" Baldwin. The name Big Bear Lake was assigned to a reservoir built nearby in 1884.

=== Political activities ===
In 1850, Wilson was elected to the Los Angeles Common Council. A year later he was elected as the second mayor of Los Angeles after California was admitted to the US as a state. He also served as a Los Angeles County supervisor (1853, 1861–64). He was elected to three terms of the California State Senate.

=== Rancho San Pascual ===
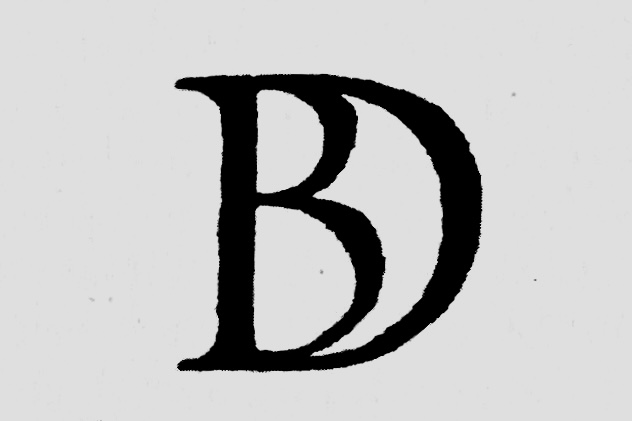
Cattle brand of Benjamin Davis Wilson

In 1854 Wilson established Lake Vineyard, his own ranch and winery near modern-day San Gabriel, California. He had acquired the property from the widow Victoria Reid, an indigenous woman of social standing in Mexican California who had received the rancho in a land grant in her name. He had been appointed by Americans as her conservator after the Mexican Cession. They assumed that an indigenous woman was not competent to manage her affairs.

Wilson next acquired possession of adjoining Rancho San Pascual (present day Pasadena) through a series of complicated land deals, which began with his lending money to the Rancho's owner Manuel Garfias in 1859. In 1863 Wilson and Dr. John Strother Griffin, who had also lent Garfias money, bought the entire rancho property outright. They diverted water from the Arroyo Seco up to the dry mesa via an aqueduct called the "Wilson Ditch." Wilson and Griffin undertook many business deals together in early Los Angeles, including railways, oil exploration, real estate, farming and ranching.

In 1864 Wilson took the first expedition to a high peak of the San Gabriel Mountains, which was later named Mount Wilson. He hoped to harvest timber there for the making of wine vats, but he found the wood inadequate. The Wilson Trail became a popular one or two-day hike to the crest of the San Gabriel Mountains by local residents for years to come.

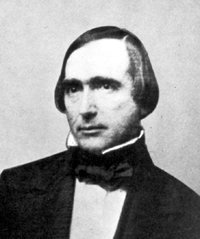
Wilson about 1850

In 1873, Wilson and Griffin subdivided their land (with Griffin getting almost 2/3 of the property, but Wilson retaining some better land – east of current Fair Oaks Avenue, near his Lake Vineyard property). Griffin then sold 2,500 acres (10 km^{2}) of his property to the "Indiana Colony," represented by Daniel M. Berry. In 1876, after the Colony had sold most of its allotted land and established what became the City of Pasadena, Wilson began subdividing and developing his adjacent landholdings which became the eastern side of the new settlement.

== Legacy ==
He gave several acres of property to his son-in-law James de Barth Shorb which he named San Marino, and developed other parts of the land as Alhambra, where he is enshrined as a statue in Renaissance Plaza. Wilson's first wife died in 1849, after which time he married the widow Margaret Hereford. They had four children, of whom one daughter Ruth married George Smith Patton and had a son who became the World War II General George S. Patton Jr. The Pattons later purchased Lake Vineyard. Wilson died at the ranch in 1878 and was buried in San Gabriel Cemetery. The last of his land holdings in the downtown Pasadena area were bequeathed to Central School on South Fair Oaks Avenue.

Mount Wilson, a metromedia center (television and radio transmission towers) for the greater Los Angeles area, is the most famous monument to Benjamin Wilson. Wilson Avenue in Pasadena and Don Benito School of the Pasadena Unified School District also honor his name. Mount Wilson is also the site of the Mount Wilson Observatory and the 100-inch Hooker telescope, where Edwin Hubble discovered the expansion of the universe.
