= Damien Marchesseault =

American politician (1818–1868)

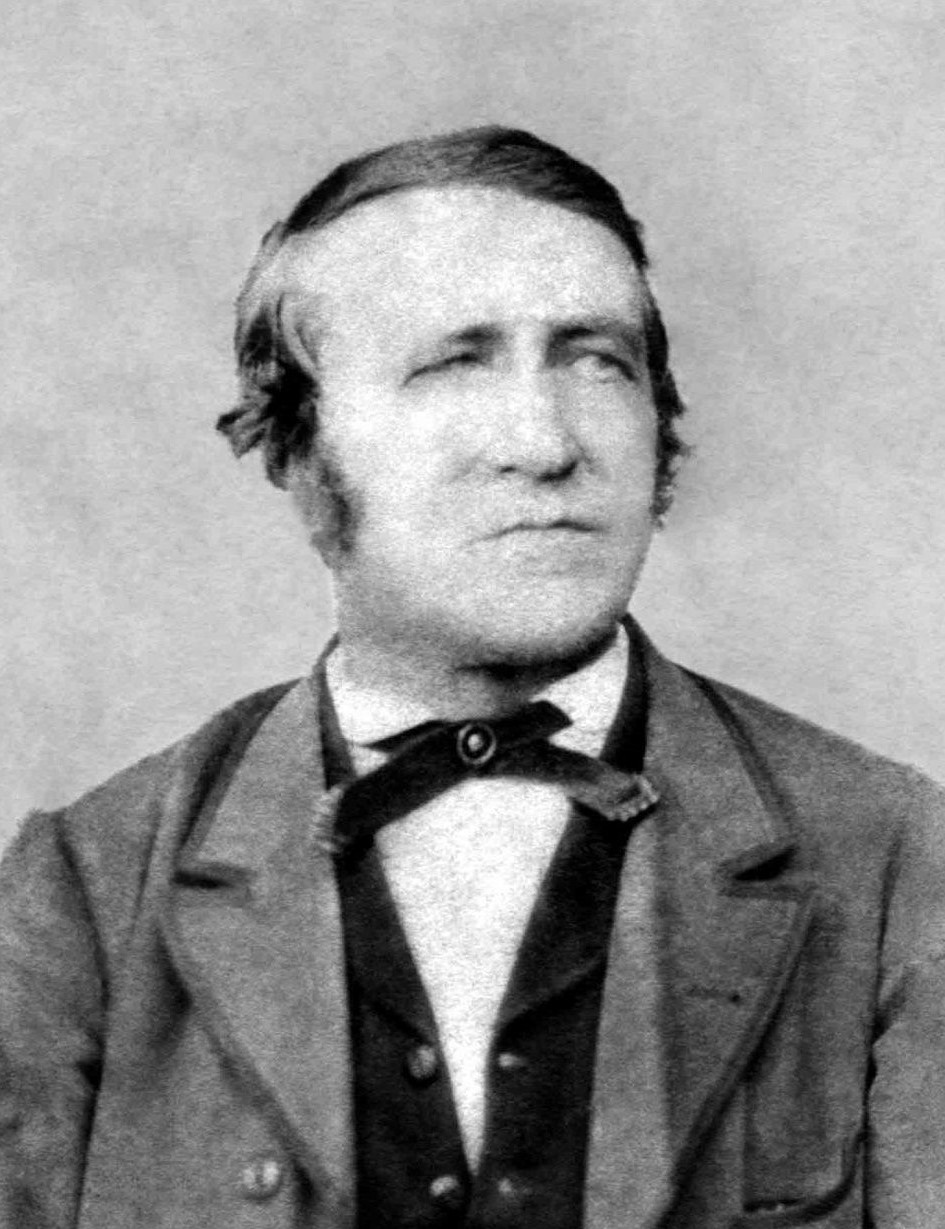

7th Mayor of Los Angeles
- In office May 9, 1859 – May 9, 1860
- Preceded by: John G. Nichols
- Succeeded by: Henry Mellus
- In office January 7, 1861 – May 6, 1865
- Preceded by: Wallace Woodworth (acting)
- Succeeded by: Jose Mascarel
- In office May 8, 1867 – August 8, 1867
- Preceded by: Cristóbal Aguilar
- Succeeded by: Cristóbal Aguilar

Personal details
- Born: April 1, 1818 Saint-Antoine-sur-Richelieu, Quebec, Canada
- Died: January 20, 1868 (aged 49) Los Angeles, California

Damien Marchesseault (or Marchesseau) (April 1, 1818 – January 20, 1868) was a Canadian-born American politician who served as the seventh mayor of Los Angeles from May 9, 1859, to May 9, 1860, and then again from January 7, 1861, to May 6, 1865. Marchesseault assumed the office one last time interrupting Cristobal Aguilar's first term in office for three months.

== Biography ==
Born in St.-Antoine-sur-Richelieu, Quebec, Canada, Marchesseault was described as a carousing onetime New Orleans gambler. With Victor Beaudry, he started an ice vending company using ice from what is now known as Icehouse Canyon near Mount San Antonio.

During his term as Zanjero of Los Angeles (water steward), Marchesseault and a partner laid wooden water pipes that burst and turned streets into sinkholes.

Marchesseault killed himself on 20 January 1868, leaving a suicide note to his wife, Mary Clark Marchesseault, stating his motivation was shame from his drinking and gambling debts.

== Legacy ==
Marchesseault Street in Los Angeles is named for him.

Political offices
Preceded by Oliver Stearns	Zanjero of Los Angeles; May 12, 1866—May 8, 1867	Succeeded by Jesus Cruz
Preceded by Cristobal Aguilar	Zanjero of Los Angeles; August 8, 1867—January 20, 1868	Succeeded by Elijah Bettis
