= 1904 Los Angeles mayoral election =

- December 5, 1904
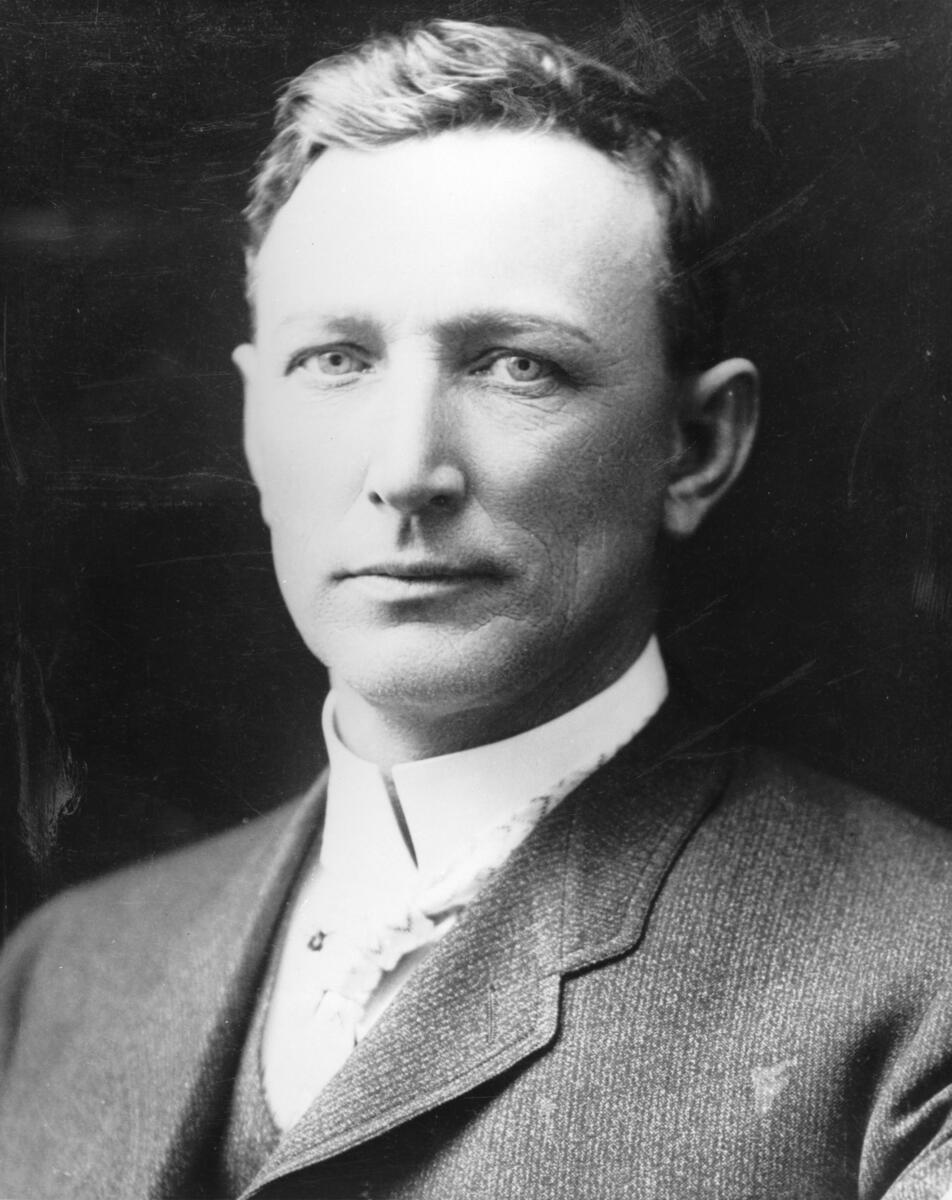

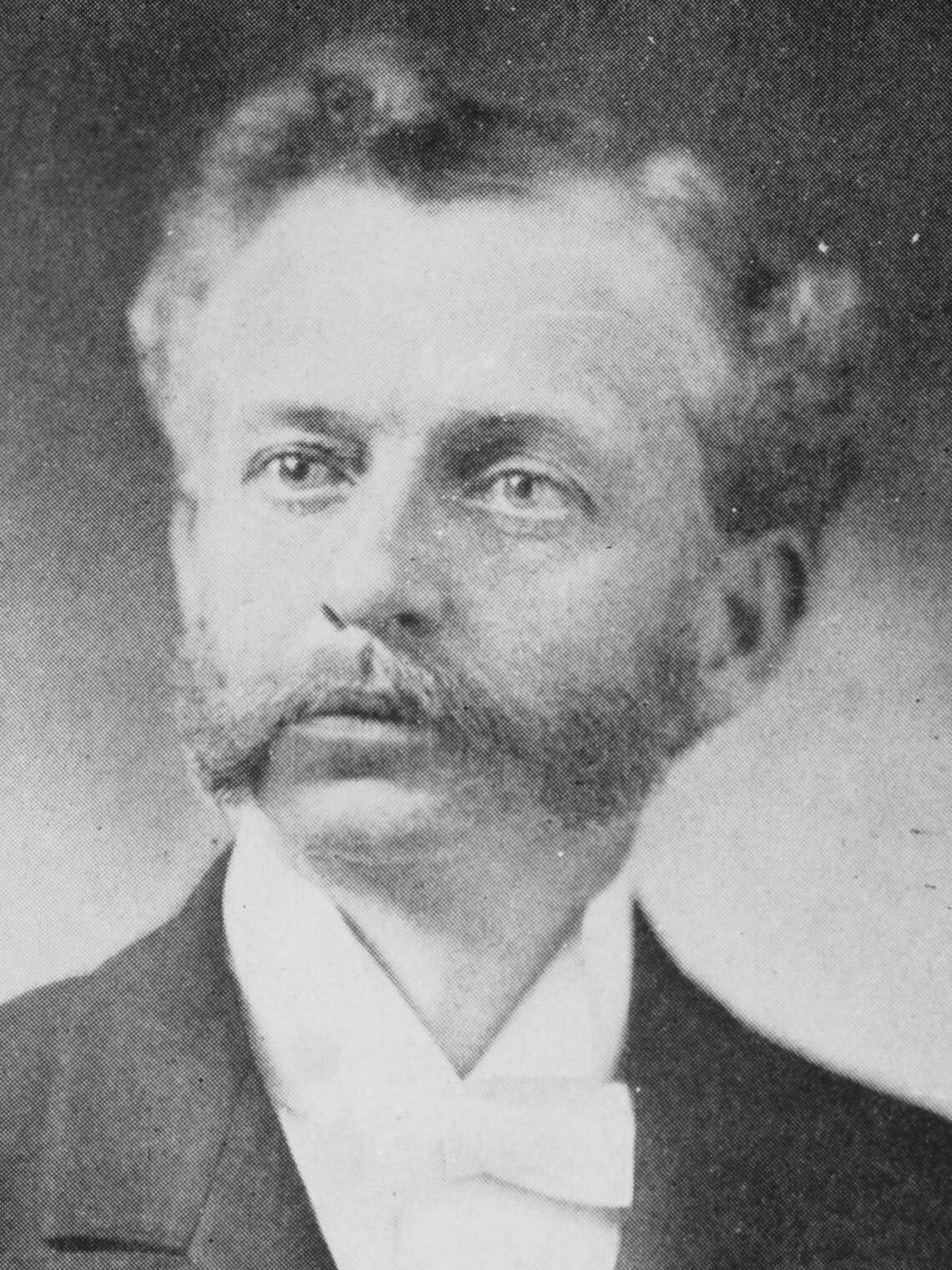
Candidate	Owen McAleer	Meredith P. Snyder
Party	Republican	Democratic
Popular vote	14,293	10,949
Percentage	56.62%	43.38%
Mayor before election
Meredith P. Snyder
Democratic
Elected Mayor
Owen McAleer
Republican

The 1904 Los Angeles mayoral election took place on December 5, 1904. Incumbent Meredith P. Snyder was defeated by Owen McAleer.

== Results ==
Los Angeles mayoral general election, December 5, 1904
Party	Candidate	Votes	%	±%
Republican	Owen McAleer	14,293	56.62%	
Democratic	Meredith P. Snyder (incumbent)	10,949	43.38%	
Total votes		25,242	100.00	
Republican gain from Democratic		Swing		
