= Thomas Foster (American mayor) =

American physician and politician from California

6th Mayor of Los Angeles
- In office May 9, 1855 – May 7, 1856
- Preceded by: Stephen Clark Foster
- Succeeded by: Stephen Clark Foster

Personal details
- Party: Democrat
- Occupation: Physician, politician

Thomas Foster was an American physician and politician. He served as the sixth mayor of Los Angeles. He was a physician and responsible for the first schoolhouse to be built at Spring and 2nd Streets. He was not related to mayor Stephen C. Foster. He was elected in May 1855 over William G. Dryden, 192 votes to 179.
