= John G. Nichols =

American politician

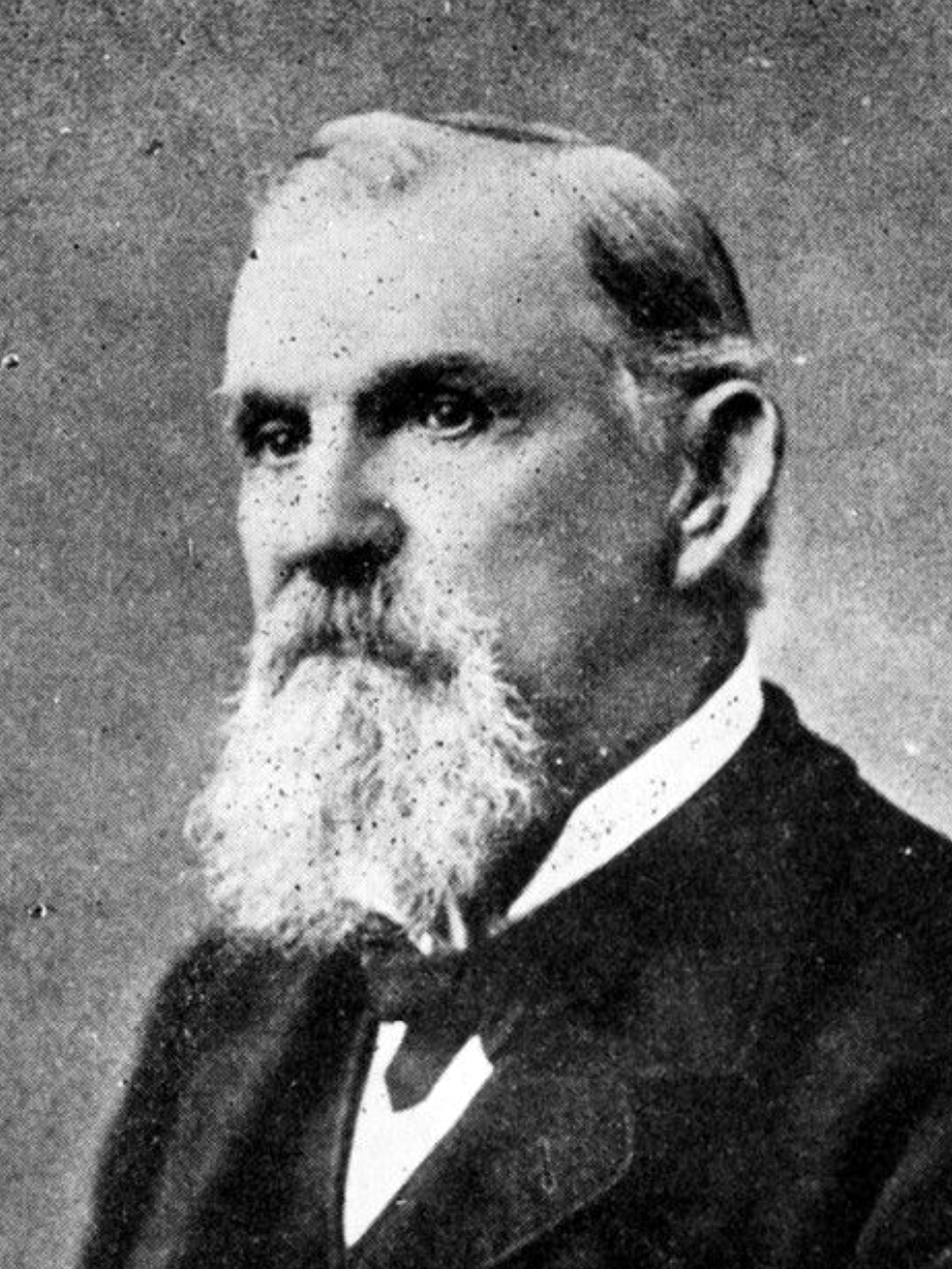

3rd Mayor of Los Angeles
- In office May 4, 1852 – May 3, 1853
- Preceded by: Benjamin Davis Wilson
- Succeeded by: Antonio F. Coronel
- In office October 4, 1856 – May 9, 1859
- Preceded by: Manuel Requena (acting)
- Succeeded by: Damien Marchesseault

Personal details
- Born: John Gregg Nichols; December 29, 1812 Canandaigua, New York, U.S.
- Died: January 22, 1898 (aged 85) Los Angeles, California, U.S.
- Spouse: Florida Cox
- Occupation: Sheriff, politician, businessman, builder

John Gregg Nichols (December 29, 1812 – January 22, 1898) was an American businessman, builder, and politician.

== Early life ==
Nichols was born on December 29, 1812, in Canandaigua, New York. His father, William Nicholas, was a Scottish immigrant.

== Career ==
Nichols served as the sheriff of Jackson County, Iowa, for two terms in the 1840s.

He made the trip to California in 1849, arriving in San Bernardino on December 31, 1849. He served as the third Mayor of Los Angeles from 1852 to 1853 and again from 1856 to 1859.

== Personal life ==
Nichols married Florida Cox. They lived in the first brick house to be built in Los Angeles, California. Their son was the first American to be born in the city, and he was the first mayor to expand the city.

On January 22, 1898, Nichols died in Los Angeles, California. He was buried at the Angelus-Rosedale Cemetery in Los Angeles, California. Nichols Canyon was named in his honor.
