= Prudent Beaudry =

American politician (1819–1893)

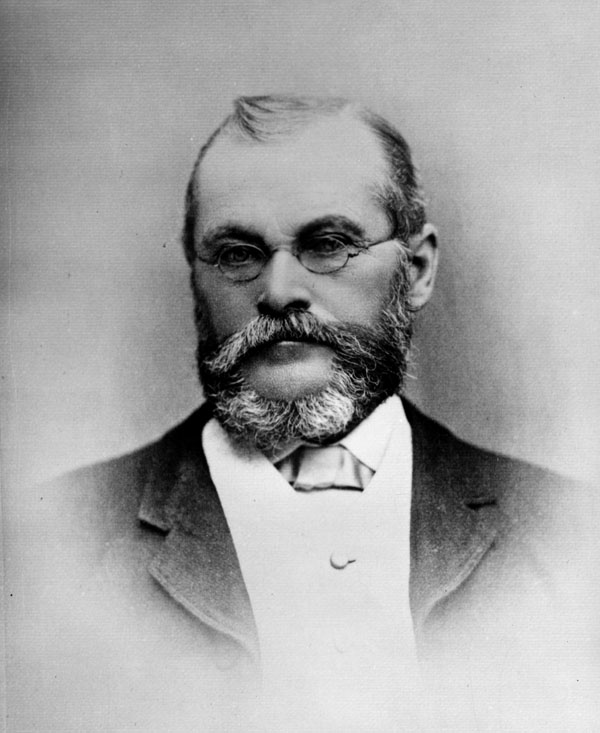
- Portrait, 1884

13th Mayor of Los Angeles
- In office December 18, 1874 – December 8, 1876
- Preceded by: James R. Toberman
- Succeeded by: Frederick A. MacDougall

Personal details
- Born: 1819 Mascouche, Lower Canada
- Died: May 29, 1893 (aged 73–74) Los Angeles, California
- Resting place: Notre Dame des Neiges Cemetery
- Relatives: Jean-Louis Beaudry (brother)

Prudent Beaudry (1819 – May 29, 1893) was a Canadian-born American politician who served as the 13th mayor of Los Angeles, from 1874 to 1876. A native of Mascouche, Lower Canada (now the province of Quebec), he was the 2nd French Canadian and 3rd French-American mayor of Los Angeles.

== Early life ==
Prudent Beaudry was born in Mascouche, Quebec, Canada, in 1819. He started a business in Montreal and during his career he visited Europe multiple times. He immigrated to the United States in 1850, and moved to Los Angeles, California, in 1852. He worked as a merchant in Los Angeles until 1867, and afterwards became active in real estate.

== Los Angeles ==
Beaudry acquired the Slate Range Gold and Silver Mining Company at a bargain price when the failed Mojave Desert firm found itself unable to pay for goods purchased from Beaudry's store, though his investment failed when the mining enterprise was destroyed by fire set by disgruntled Californian Indian tribe member workers.

Beaudry then decided to use his savings to buy inexpensive, undeveloped parcels of land on Bunker Hill above central Los Angeles which featured views of the city at its base and the Pacific Ocean, and an undeveloped hilltop he named Angelino Heights. At both locations, Beaudry developed prestigious, upscale residential districts.

He also bought property near the Sierra Nevada, and built an aqueduct to redirect several mountain streams to his properties. He owned a great deal of real estate in Downtown Los Angeles, located for the most part around Temple Street, Bunker Hill, Bellevue Road, and in the Angelino Heights and Arcadia areas.

Beaudry served on the Los Angeles Common Council from 1873 to 1875, and was elected as mayor in 1874. Coincidentally during this time, his brother Jean-Louis Beaudry was mayor of Montreal.

He died on May 29, 1893, in Los Angeles, but was entombed at the Notre Dame des Neiges Cemetery in Montreal. The L.A. Times praised him as one of the most visionary men in Los Angeles. Following his will, his body was brought back and buried in Montreal. Los Angeles County praised Beaudry in these words:

Prudent Beaudry has the record of having made in different lines five large fortunes, four of which, through the act of God, or by the duplicity of man, in whom he had trusted, have been lost; but even then he was not discouraged, but faced the world, even at an advanced age, like a lion at bay, and his reward he now enjoys in the shape of a large and assured fortune. Of such stuff are the men who fill great places, and who develop and make a country. To such men we of this later day owe much of the beauty and comfort that surround us, and to such we should look with admiration as models upon which to form rules of action in trying times.

== Legacy ==
Beaudry Avenue in Downtown Los Angeles is named for him. The street is on the far west side of his 1874 Bellevue Terrace Tract property, west of Olive Street and north of Sixth Street. The Los Angeles State Normal School, a teachers college and predecessor to UCLA, was built on the tract, where the present-day Los Angeles Central Library is located.

Beaudry was instrumental in helping found the towns of Alhambra and Pasadena.

The Beaudry a residential tower in Los Angeles was named in honor of the mayor. It is the tallest residential building in California as of 2023 completion.

== Other reading ==
- Antoine Bernard, Nos pionniers de l'Ouest, Presses de la survivance française de l'Université Laval, 1992
- Joseph Tassé, Des Canadiens de l'Ouest, Compagnie d'imprimerie canadienne, 1878
- Gaétan Frigon: Prudent Beaudry, and other pioneering Quebec businessmen, in Legacy. How french Canadians shaped North America. McClelland & Stewart, Toronto 2016; réimpr. 2019 ISBN 0771072392 p 59 – 83 (including sections Victor Beaudry, mining magnate and Jean-Louis Beaudry, entrepreneur, patriote, and politician)
  - (in French) Bâtisseurs d'Amérique: des canadiens français qui ont faite de l'histoire. ed. André Pratte, Jonathan Kay. La Presse, Montréal 2016, p 215 – 242
