= John Bryson (mayor) =

American businessman and Mayor of Los Angeles (1819-1907)

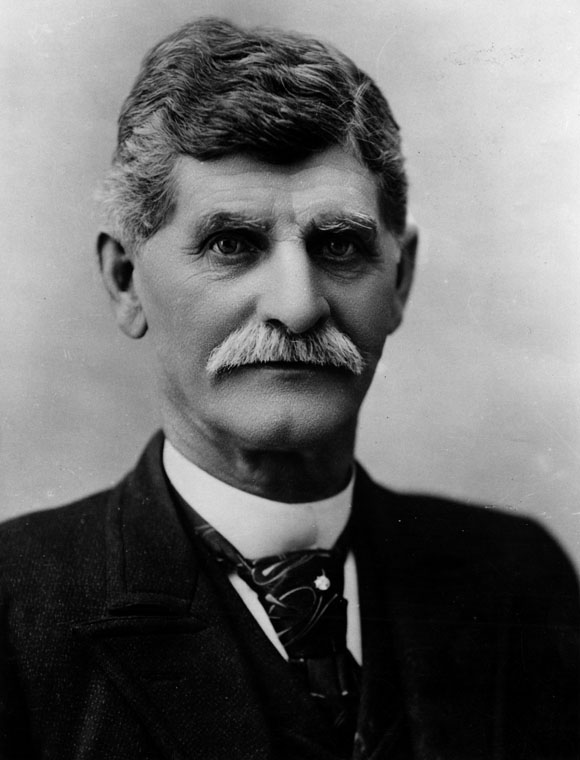
- Portrait of Bryson

19th Mayor of Los Angeles
- In office December 10, 1888 – February 25, 1889
- Preceded by: William H. Workman
- Succeeded by: Henry T. Hazard

Personal details
- Born: June 20, 1819 Lancaster County, Pennsylvania, U.S.
- Died: October 11, 1907 (aged 88) Los Angeles, California, U.S.

John Bryson (June 20, 1819 – October 11, 1907) was an American businessman who served as the 19th Mayor of Los Angeles from December 10, 1888, to February 25, 1889.

Known as "Uncle John", he worked as a cabinetmaker before becoming involved in the Los Angeles real estate business.

== Biography ==
On June 20, 1819, John Bryson was born in Lancaster County, Pennsylvania. He had twelve siblings.

Bryson was trained as an apprentice cabinetmaker and worked as a journeyman. In the 1840s, he moved with his wife Emeline Sentman to Ohio and began his own carpentry business. They moved to Muscatine, Iowa, in 1851 before relocating five years later to Washington County, Iowa. While there, he became involved in the lumber business and built his own hotel.

Bryson then moved to Los Angeles, becoming involved with the real estate business.

Despite being "never very active in politics", Bryson served a single term as the Mayor of Los Angeles in 1888.

=== Later life ===
In 1894, Emeline filed for a divorce from her husband after accusing him of having an affair. Although they never officially divorced, Bryson gave half of his property to his wife.

On 11 October 1907, Bryson died at his Los Angeles house. The following day, he was interred in the family vault at the Rosedale Cemetery.

=== Children ===
Bryson and his wife had several children, including:

- John M. Bryson (died March 27, 1915), businessman in the lumber and real estate business
- Isaac H. Bryson
- James F. Bryson
- Margaret Bryson
