= Stephen Clark Foster =

American politician (1820–1898)

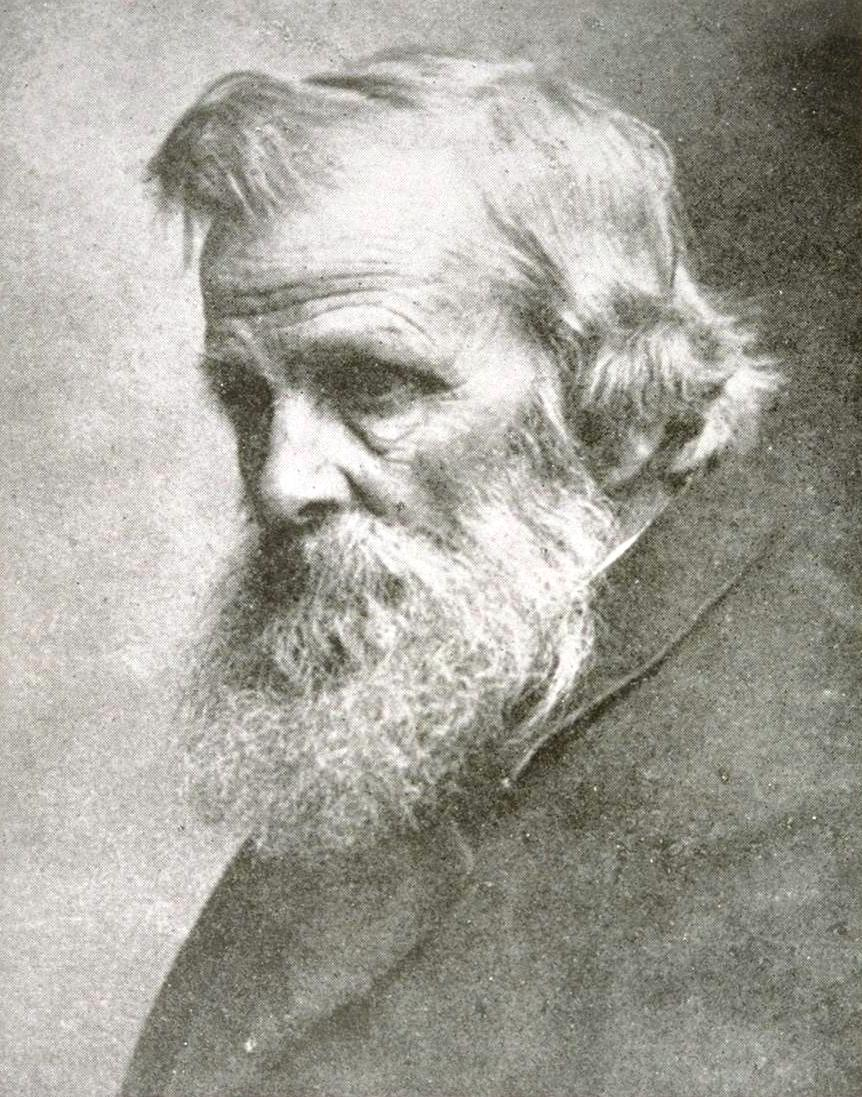
- Portrait of Stephen Clark Foster circa 1880

Chair of Los Angeles County
- In office December 6, 1859 – December 4, 1860
- Preceded by: Julian A. Chavez
- Succeeded by: Abel Stearns

5th Mayor of Los Angeles
- In office May 4, 1854 – January 13, 1855 & January 25, 1855 – May 9, 1855
- Preceded by: Antonio F. Coronel
- Succeeded by: Dr. Thomas Foster
- In office May 7, 1856 – September 22, 1856
- Preceded by: Dr. Thomas Foster
- Succeeded by: Manuel Requena (acting)

De Facto Mayor of Los Angeles
- In office January 1, 1848 – May 21, 1849
- Preceded by: Ygnacio Palomares (as Alcalde)
- Succeeded by: Jose del Carmen Lugo(May, 1849)

Personal details
- Born: Stephen Clark Foster; December 17, 1820 Machias, Maine
- Died: 28 January 1898 (aged 77) California
- Resting place: Calvary Cemetery, Los Angeles, CA
- Party: Democratic
- Spouse: María Merced Lugo
- Education: Yale University
- Occupation: Politician

Stephen Clark Foster (December 17, 1820 – January 27, 1898) was a politician, the first American mayor of Los Angeles under United States military rule. Foster served in the state constitutional convention, and was elected to the State Senate. He was elected as mayor of Los Angeles in 1856, and later elected for four terms to the Los Angeles County Board of Supervisors.

== Early life and education ==
Foster was born in Machias, Maine, December 17, 1820. He graduated from Yale College in 1840.

== Career ==
He taught at a private academy in the South. In 1845 at age 25, he headed for California, like many other young single men, via El Paso and Santa Fe. While in Santa Fe, Foster was hired by Quartermaster Wm. M.D. McKissack to be an interpreter for the Mormon Battalion of Volunteers, then on its way to California as part of the Mexican–American War forces sent to California. He acted unofficially as an additional guide.

In the stormy period when California was under US military rule after the defeat of the Mexicans, Governor Richard Barnes Mason appointed the 26-year-old Foster alcalde (mayor) of Los Angeles to replace the dissolved ayuntamiento (government) of the Mexicans. For this reason, Foster often has been referred to as the first American mayor of the city. He served as alcalde from January 1, 1848 to May 21, 1849. For the remainder of that year, or until the city came under United States jurisdiction in 1850, Foster served as prefect.

Mason appointed José del Carmen Lugo, a prominent and mature Californio, as mayor following Foster.

== Marriage and family ==
During his early years in Los Angeles, Foster made a marriage important to his standing in the community. He met and married María Merced Lugo, one of the sisters of José del Carmen Lugo above. Their father was a prominent Californio landowner. The Fosters had five children together.

Foster was elected a member of the 1849 California Constitutional Convention, which met in Monterey. The group framed the state Constitution and petitioned Congress for admission of California into the United States.

== Political career ==
Foster achieved his first political office after statehood in 1850, when he was elected to the Los Angeles Common Council for a one-year term. In 1851 he was elected California state senator from Southern California, and served two years.

In 1854, Foster was elected mayor of Los Angeles. He is credited with authorizing construction of the first public school in Los Angeles. Los Angeles was then said to be the toughest frontier town in the United States. It had a diverse population with simmering tensions after the war, as well as a "disorderly element". The surrounding territory was overrun by bandits driven from the gold mines of northern California southward into the cattle ranching counties. Numerous gamblers and criminals drifted into the city to escape the vigilantes of San Francisco.

Mayor Foster, like most of the city's prominent citizens, was a member of the local vigilance committee and of the Los Angeles Rangers, the mounted body of volunteer police. In early 1855, Foster resigned his official position to lead a lynch mob. After the lynching, the people held a special election and returned Foster to office for the remainder of his regular term. Foster was re-elected mayor in 1856. He resigned Sept. 22, 1856, to act as executor for the large estate of his brother-in-law, Colonel Isaac Williams.

Foster next served as a supervisor on the Los Angeles County Board of Supervisors for four terms. He was elected in 1856, 1858 and 1859. In 1857 he replaced Jonathan R. Scott, who resigned as county supervisor in March of that year.

== Historian ==
Foster documented the history of California under the rule of Mexico in articles published by the Southern California Historical Society. In 1888 he wrote A Sketch of Some of the Earliest Pioneers of Los Angeles and Reminiscences: My First Procession in Los Angeles March 16, 1847.

At Forefather's Day celebrations on December 21, 1886, Foster read a paper about yankee pioneers, titled First New Englanders Who Came to Los Angeles, which The Los Angeles Times stated was a "historically valuable paper."

== Death ==
He died in 1898 and his funeral was held in Downey, California. Former Los Angeles mayor James R. Toberman was a pall-bearer.
