= Henry Mellus =

American politician

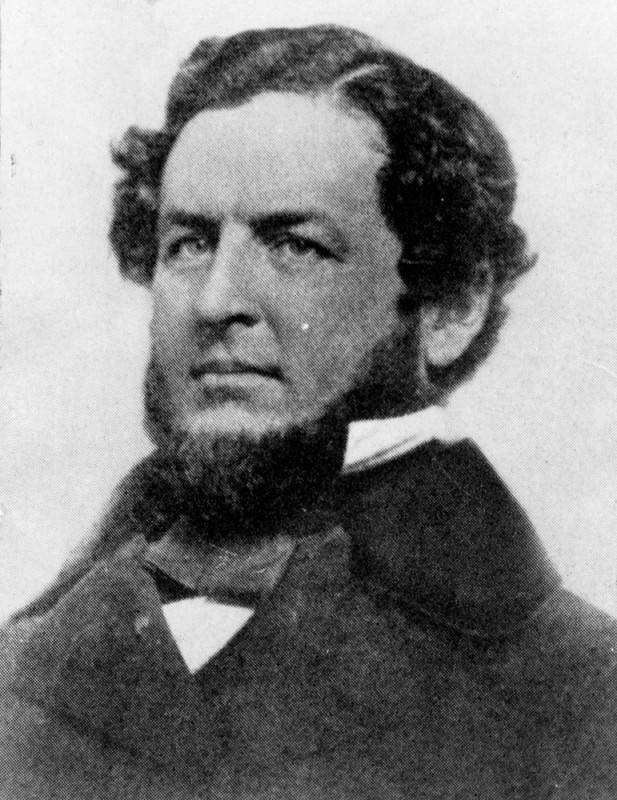
- Mellus in 1860

8th Mayor of Los Angeles
- In office May 9, 1860 – December 26, 1860
- Preceded by: Damien Marchesseault
- Succeeded by: Wallace Woodworth (acting)

Personal details
- Born: August 24, 1816 Dorchester, Boston
- Died: December 26, 1860 (aged 44) Los Angeles, California

Henry Mellus (August 24, 1816 – December 26, 1860) served as the eighth Mayor of Los Angeles from May 9, 1860, to December 26, 1860. He was a successful California businessman.

== Biography ==
Born in Dorchester, Boston, he was the son of William and Amelia (Lyon) Mellus and was a brother of Francis Mellus. Henry sailed "around the [Cape] horn" with Richard Henry Dana Jr. on the ship named the Pilgrim, and arrived in California in 1835, leaving the ship to become an agent's clerk onshore. In 1837 Mellus returned to Boston, and then returned in 1839 to California, becoming a successful merchant in San Francisco. In 1845 he and William Davis Merry Howard formed the firm of Mellus & Howard in San Francisco. This firm had an active commercial business in San Francisco, and in 1846 bought the property of the Hudson's Bay Company.

In 1846 Henry married Anita F. Johnson (the daughter of James (Santiago) Johnson and a sister of Francis Mellus's wife Adelaida). After the marriage, the Mellus’ family lived in Los Angeles. Bell Row, a two-story, L-shaped adobe built by Captain Alexander Bell, became Mellus Row, owned by Henry Mellus.

After relinquishing the Bryant & Sturgis agency in 1848, Mellus went to Boston with his family on a visit. He returned to this coast in the winter of 1849–1850, at which time he had an attack of apoplexy. He partially recovered.

After Henry retired from Mellus, Howard & Co., his brother Francis joined as a partner, and the firm became Howard, Mellus & Co. Francis shortly after withdrew, and the firm name was changed to Howard & Green.

Henry Mellus was elected as Mayor of Los Angeles on May 9, 1860, and died while holding that office.
