= Martin F. Betkouski =

American politician

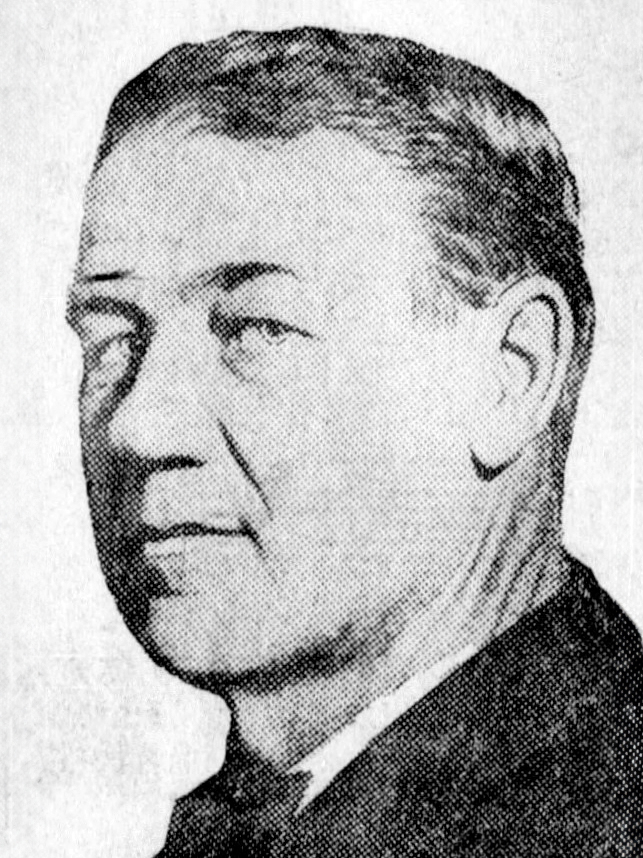
- Betkouski in 1915

Member of the Los Angeles City Council for the at-large district
- In office December 10, 1909 – July 1, 1917

Personal details
- Born: 1860
- Died: 1942 (aged 81–82)

Martin Francis Betkouski (1860–1942) was a member of the Los Angeles City Council between 1909 and 1917.

== Public service ==
In 1906 Betkouski was a member of the Los Angeles Fire Commission.

A Los Angeles County grand jury in 1917 accused him as a City Council member of misconduct in office in connection with property transactions in the area where Union Station was eventually built. According to the Los Angeles Times, while councilman for the Seventh Ward, he was alleged "to have realized a profit of more than $50,000 by securing options on property within the terminal site, before the owners were aware of the proposed improvement." He was also said to have received a check of "several thousand dollars" from attorney Isidore Dockweiler, who represented the terminal company.

Betkouski ran for re-election in 1917, placing 15th in a field of eighteen candidates, of whom only the first nine were successful in a first-past-the post election. The grand jury accusation was dropped after Betkouski lost the election, on the grounds that the only penalty he might suffer would be removal from office. In the same year, Betkouski was elected a member of the Los Angeles Board of Trade.

== Personal life ==
He was born in San Francisco, California, and moved to Los Angeles in 1887. He died shortly before May 8, 1942, in his home, 1840 Canyon Drive, Hollywood, survived by his wife, Mary E. Betkouski, a son, Marcellian R. Betkouski, and two daughters, Marie C. Betkouski and Margaret T. Betkouski. Interment was at Calvary Cemetery.

Through his son, he is the grandfather of Mathew Betkouski, who in September 2026 was posthumously identified as a possible suspect in the 1982 Chicago Tylenol murders.

== Additional reading ==
- Paul R. Spizzeri, Homestead Museum, "'In the Big City Class': A Progress Map of the Union Terminal Warehouse District of Los Angeles, April and September 1917," The Homestead Blog, September 17, 2019
