= Joel Turner (mayor) =

American politician

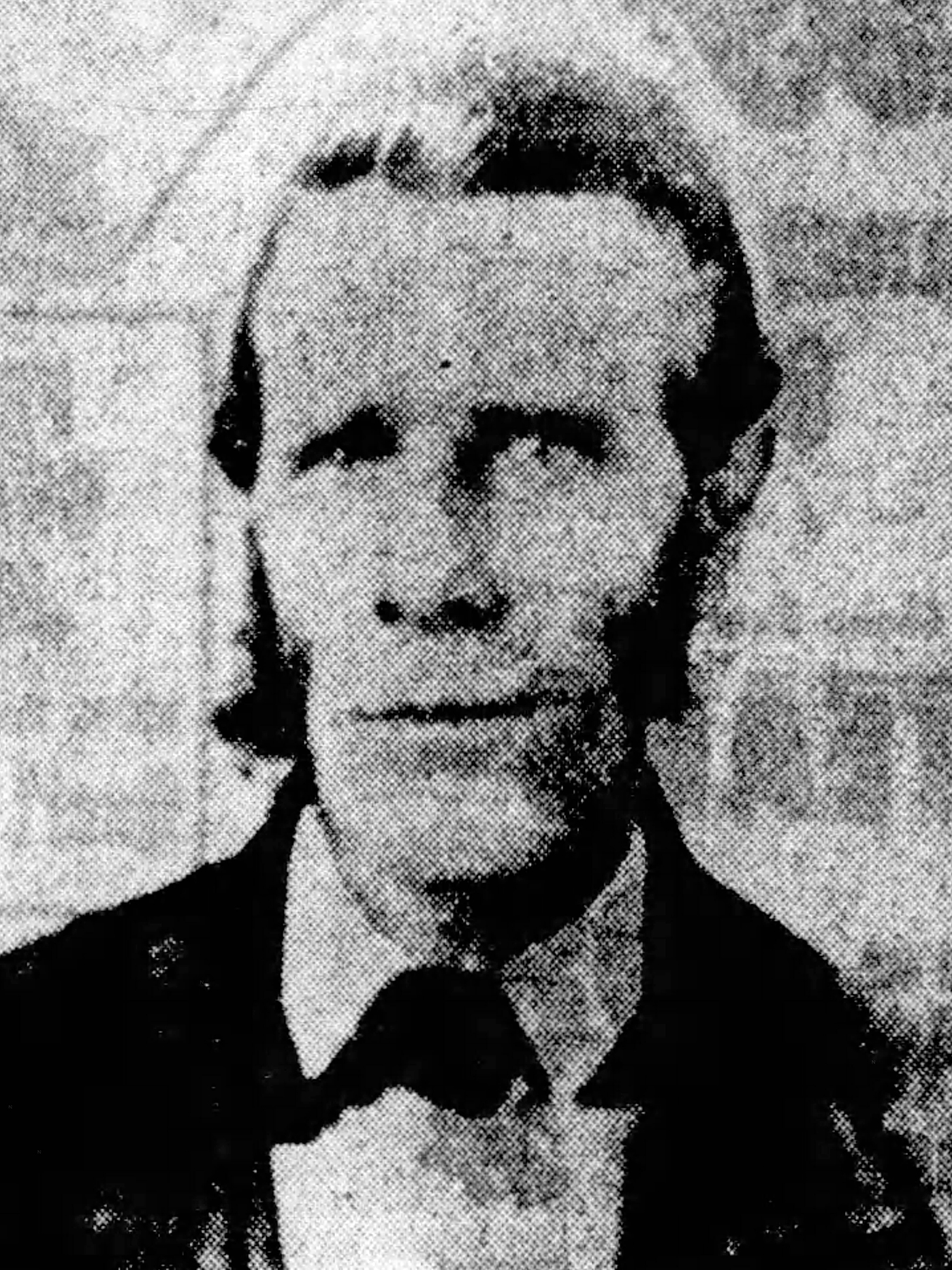
- Purported portrait of Turner

11th Mayor of Los Angeles
- In office December 9, 1868 – December 9, 1870
- Preceded by: Cristóbal Aguilar
- Succeeded by: Cristóbal Aguilar

Personal details
- Born: 1820
- Died: 1888 (aged 67–68)

Joel Turner (1820?–1888) was the 11th mayor of Los Angeles, California, from December 9, 1868, to December 9, 1870. He served two terms.

In 1870, Turner, eight members of the City Council and two members of a previous council were indicted by a grand jury for felony. "It is said that an issue of city scrip of over $50,000 has been made and that less than one fifth only is now accounted for, and that the books containing the stubs are not to be found." Each was freed on bail. Turner was convicted of malfeasance.
