= Claudio López (mayor) =

Californio politician

Alcalde of Los Angeles
- In office 1826–1827
- Preceded by: José Antonio Carrillo
- Succeeded by: Guillermo Cota

Personal details
- Born: 1767 San José del Cabo, California
- Died: 1 January 1833 (aged 65–66) San Gabriel, California
- Occupation: Politician

Claudio López (1767 – 1 January 1833) was a Californio politician who served as mayordomo of Mission San Gabriel Arcángel and Alcalde of Los Angeles.

== Biography ==
Claudio López was born in 1767 in San José del Cabo. His parents, Ignacio López and María Facunda López, were members of the prominent and wealthy López family, descended from Castilian aristocracy. He had four siblings: Juan, Juan Francisco, María Francisca, and María de la Encarnación.

López was the Mayordomo of San Gabriel for more than thirty years, serving under Frs. José María de Zalvidea and José Bernardo Sánchez. As Mayordomo, he was responsible for managing the affairs of the mission, including its orchards, vineyards, and warehouses, and overseeing the native laborers. He also supervised the various ranchos subordinate to the mission, such as San Bernardino, Ucaipe, El Chino, San Jose, Cucamonga, Santa Anita, Rosa de Castilla, and San Pasqual. His success at this made him a locally popular figure, with contemporary writer Hugo Reid remarking that, unlike most mission officials, López achieved his successes "without flogging".

For his work as Mayordomo, López was granted the use of a rancho, which he named Santa Anita in honor of Anita Cota, whom he hoped to marry. After Anita's death, López instead married her cousin María Luisa Cota on 20 April 1789. The couple had two children: Estevan López and Maria Ygnecia Valenzuela.

In 1826, López became Alcalde-Mayor of the Pueblo de Los Ángeles. He served a single term, and afterwards continued as Mayordomo of San Gabriel until his death in 1833.
