= Wallace Woodworth =

American politician

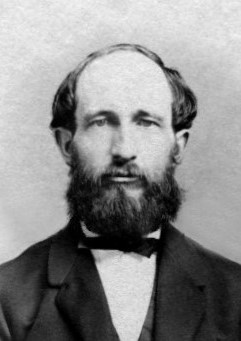
- Woodworth in 1860

Chair of Los Angeles County
- In office December 1, 1868 – December 3, 1872
- Preceded by: Maurice Kremer
- Succeeded by: Hugh Forsman

Acting Mayor of Los Angeles
- In office December 26, 1860 – January 7, 1861
- Preceded by: Henry Mellus
- Succeeded by: Damien Marchesseault

Personal details
- Born: July 28, 1832 Johnstown, Ohio
- Died: September 13, 1882 (aged 50) Los Angeles, California

Wallace Woodworth (July 28, 1832 – September 13, 1882) was a wealthy businessman and rancher in Los Angeles County, California, United States, in the 19th century. He was a member of the governing bodies of both Los Angeles City and County. He helped organize the city's first gas company.

== Personal ==
Woodworth was born in Johnstown, Ohio, on July 28, 1832.

He came to Los Angeles County in 1853 and lived with his uncle, Isaac Williams, on the Chino Ranch, of which the young man became manager. He grew wealthy in raising and selling cattle.

Woodworth married Carrie, a granddaughter of Antonio Maria Lugo, and they had six children, including an oldest son named Joseph and a younger one named Wallace J. Daughters were Hazel, Juanita and Mamie.

He died September 13, 1882, in his home on San Pedro Street of what his physicians called an "affection of the heart." Interment was in Evergreen Cemetery, Los Angeles.

== Vocation ==
Upon moving to Los Angeles in 1858, Woodworth bought the interest of James D. Brady in a furniture business co-owned by William H. Perry. In 1867 the Woodworth and Perry partnership organized a gas company, which brought the first gas lights to the city. Others in the venture, capitalized with $36,000, were James Hagan, John Goller and George J. Clark.

In 1872, S. H. Mott became a partner and the firm disposed of the furniture business and became "one of the largest and wealthiest" lumber yards in Los Angeles.

== Public affairs ==
Woodworth, a Democrat, was elected to the Los Angeles Common Council, the governing body of the city, in 1859, 1860 and 1864, and to the Los Angeles County Board of Supervisors in 1867, serving until 1871. In late 1860 in his role as Council President, Woodworth served as acting mayor for two weeks as a result of the death of Mayor Henry Mellis.

== Legacy ==
Woodworth is remembered with a large burial vault at Evergreen Cemetery, designed by A. C. Thompson, a leading memorialist of his time. Upon his death, Woodworth left an estate estimated at $350,000 to $450,000, half to his wife and half to their six children.
