= James R. Toberman =

Mayor of Los Angeles

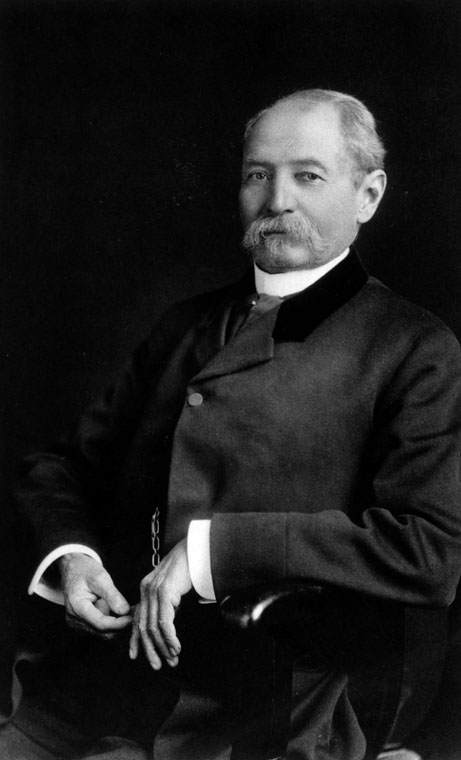
- Portrait of James Toberman,

12th Mayor of Los Angeles
- In office December 5, 1878 – December 9, 1882
- Preceded by: Bernard Cohn
- Succeeded by: Cameron E. Thom
- In office December 5, 1872 – December 18, 1874
- Preceded by: Cristóbal Aguilar
- Succeeded by: Prudent Beaudry

Personal details
- Born: 1836 Virginia
- Died: January 26, 1911 (aged 74–75)
- Party: Democratic
- Other political affiliations: Workingmen's

James Ralph Toberman (1836 – January 26, 1911) served six one-year terms as Mayor of Los Angeles. He first served between 1872 and 1874 and again between 1878 and 1882. Mayor Toberman switched on the city's first electric streetlights. He helped map out the first street car grid and water and sewer systems.

== Biography ==
James Toberman came to Los Angeles in 1864 when president Abraham Lincoln appointed him U.S. Revenue Assessor. Before his mayoralty, he was elected to the Los Angeles Common Council, the governing body of the city, in a special election on February 23, 1870, for a term ending on December 9 of that year.

Some of the accomplishments during his terms in office: the creation of the Los Angeles Chamber of Commerce, the Los Angeles Herald, the Athletic Club, and the Los Angeles Normal School (which became the Los Angeles branch of the University of California/UCLA in 1919); the organization of L.A.'s first synagogue; the city's first street paving (Main Street) and electric lights; the installation of the first telephone lines; the first orange trees planted along city streets; plans laid out for the city's water and sewer systems. Toberman cut taxes from $1.60 to $1.00 per $100.00 of assessed value. Toberman also left a surplus of $25,000 in the city treasury.

In 1909, Toberman and his wife Emma founded the Homer Toberman Deaconess Home in memory of their late son Homer (1872-1901). It exists today as the Toberman Neighborhood Center.
