= List of members of the Los Angeles County Board of Supervisors =

The Los Angeles County Board of Supervisors is the legislative body of Los Angeles County, California.

== Board members ==
=== Through 1851 ===
The State of California was founded in 1850. On February 18, 1850, the County of Los Angeles was established as one of the 27 original counties, several months before California was admitted to the Union. The Los Angeles County Board of Supervisors was created in 1852. The Court of Sessions was used under Mexican custom until 1852. The court was composed of a County Judge and two County Associate Justices. Julian A. Chavez served in the Court of Sessions as a "Judge of Waters" and later as a "Judge of the Plains" prior to the formation of the Board of Supervisors.

Year	Representation
Before 1850	Court of Sessions. Before board creation.
1850	Court of Sessions
1851	Court of Sessions

=== 1852–1861 ===
The Los Angeles County Board of Supervisors was created in 1852. Terms of office through the first decade were for one year. A piece of the county's territory was given towards the creation of San Bernardino County in 1853. [Note: Names in black have an article under that name, but not the person concerned in this table].

Year	1st District	2nd District	3rd District	4th District	5th District
1852	Jefferson Hunt	Julian A. Chavez	Francisco P. Temple	Manuel Requena	Samuel Arbuckle
1853	David W. Alexander	Leonardo Cota	G. A. Sturgis	Daniel M. Thomas	Benjamin D. Wilson
1854	David W. Alexander	Stephen C. Foster	Juan Sepulveda	Cristobal Aguilar	Samuel S. Thompson
1855	Thomas Burdick/ John G. Downey	David Lewis	Cristobal Aguilar	Agustin Olvera	James R. Barton
1856	David Lewis	Cristobal Aguilar	Stephen C. Foster	Thomas Burdick	Agustin Olvera/ James B. Winston
1857	Jonathan R. Scott/ Stephen C. Foster	William M. Stockton	Tomas Avila Sanchez	Richard C. Fryer	Manuel Dominguez/ Felix Bachman
1858	Julian A. Chavez	Francisco O'Campo	Tomas Avila Sanchez	Stephen C. Foster	Francis Mellus/ Ralph Emerson
1859	Stephen C. Foster	Ralph Emerson	Tomas Avila Sanchez	George C. Alexander/ Haywood	Bernardino Guirado
1860	Abel Stearns	Cristobal Aguilar	R.B. Moore	Gabriel Allen	Antonio F. Coronel
1861	Benjamin D. Wilson	Morris S. Goodman/ Thomas George Barker	Fielding W. Gibson	Julian A. Chavez	Julius Morris

=== 1862–1871 ===
Terms of office changed to two years. A piece of the county's territory was given towards the creation of Kern County in 1866.

Year	1st District	2nd District	3rd District	4th District	5th District
1862	Julius Morris	Benjamin D. Wilson	Fielding W. Gibson	Cristobal Aguilar	Vicente Lugo
1864	Asa Ellis	Benjamin D. Wilson	Cristobal Aguilar	Julius Morris	Philip Sichel/ Maurice Kremer
1866	John G. Downey	Maurice Kremer	Edmund H. Boyd	Felix Signoret	Eduardo Poyoreno
1868	Wallace Woodworth	James B. Winston	Robert Henry Mayes	A. Langenberger/ Hugh Forsman	Enrique Avila
1870	Hugh Forsman	G.D. Cankton	E. Sanford	Enrique Avila	R. Yorba

=== 1872–1882 ===
Los Angeles County is divided into four districts with two persons on behalf of the First District. [Note: Names in black have an article under that name, but not the person concerned in this table].

Year	1st District (Person 1)	1st District (Person 2)	2nd District	3rd District	4th District
1872	Francisco Machado	Samuel Bradford Caswell	Hugh Forsman	Francisco Palomares	Alfred Louis Bush
1874	Francisco Machado	John M. Griffith/ Gabriel Allen	George Hinds	Francisco Palomares	Edward Evey
1876	John D. Young	Gabriel Allen/ Charles Prager	George Hinds/ John J. Morton	J.C. Hannon	Edward Evey/ W.H. Spurgeon
1878	John D. Young/ A.H. Rogers	Charles Prager	John J. Morton	J.C. Hannon	W.H. Spurgeon/ James D. Ott
1880	A.H. Rogers	Charles Prager	W.F. Cooper	J.C. Hannon	James D. Ott/ Richard Egan
1882	A.H. Rogers	Charles Prager	W.F. Cooper	J.C. Hannon	Richard Egan

=== 1883–1884 ===
Los Angeles County is divided into seven districts.

Year	1st District	2nd District	3rd District	4th District	5th District	6th District	7th District
1883	L.G. Giroux	Charles Prager	William M. Osborn	Dave V. Waldron	S. Levy	Dan Reichard	J.H. Moesser

=== Since 1885 ===
Los Angeles County is divided into five districts. Districts 1 & 3 remain at a term of two years for one period, and then four years thereafter. Districts 2, 4, & 5 now have a term of four years. All districts became four-year terms in a phased in process by 1887. This allows for staggered elections every two years, which is still in effect. A piece of the county's territory was given towards the creation of Orange County in 1889. Although all local government positions in California are officially nonpartisan, virtually all board members are members of a political party and, if known, that information is included with the article.

Year	1st District	2nd District	3rd District	4th District	5th District
1885	James Foord	Oscar Macy	Milton Lindley	George Hinds	Jacob Ross, Jr.
1885	James Foord	Oscar Macy	Joseph W. Venable		Jacob Ross, Jr.
1887	William T. Martin	Oscar Macy	Joseph W. Venable	Thomas Edward Rowan	Jacob Ross, Jr.
1889	William T. Martin	S.M. Perry	Thomas Edward Rowan	Alonzo Edward Davis	Sheldon Littlefield
1889	William T. Martin	S.M. Perry	Thomas Edward Rowan	Alonzo Edward Davis	Henry C. Hubbard
1891	John W. Cook	S.M. Perry	E.A. Forrester	Alonzo Edward Davis	Henry C. Hubbard
1893	John W. Cook	Andrew W. Francisco	E.A. Forrester	James Hay	James Hanley
1895	W.L. Woodward	Andrew W. Francisco	Edward S. Field	James Hay	James Hanley
1897	W.L. Woodward	Robert E. Wirsching	Edward S. Field	Alonzo Edward Davis	James Hanley
1899	Orray W. Longden	Robert E. Wirsching	Edward S. Field	Alonzo Edward Davis	James Hanley
1901	Orray W. Longden	George Alexander	Edward S. Field	Peter James Wilson	James Hanley
1902	Orray W. Longden	George Alexander	Edward S. Field	Peter James Wilson	James Hanley
1902	Orray W. Longden	George Alexander	Edward S. Field	Peter James Wilson	Charles E. Patterson
1903	Orray W. Longden	George Alexander	A.J. Graham	Peter James Wilson	Charles E. Patterson
1905	Orray W. Longden	George Alexander	A.J. Graham	Peter James Wilson	Vacant
1905	John T. Brady	George Alexander	A.J. Graham	Peter James Wilson	Vacant
1907	Charles Dewey Manning	George Alexander	S. Tuston Eldridge	Peter James Wilson	Charles E. Patterson
1909	Charles Dewey Manning	Henry D. McCabe	S. Tuston Eldridge	Clarence J. Nellis	Richard W. Pridham
1911	Charles Dewey Manning	Henry D. McCabe	Sidney Allcutt Butler	Clarence J. Nellis	Richard W. Pridham
1913	Charles Dewey Manning	Richard H. Norton	Sidney Allcutt Butler	William E. Hinshaw	Richard W. Pridham
1914	Charles Dewey Manning	Richard H. Norton	Sidney Allcutt Butler/Frank E. Woodley	William E. Hinshaw	Richard W. Pridham
1915	John J. Hamilton	Richard H. Norton	Frank E. Woodley	William E. Hinshaw	Richard W. Pridham
1917	John J. Hamilton	Richard H. Norton/Edward J. Delorey	Frank E. Woodley	William E. Hinshaw/ Reuban F. McClellan	Richard W. Pridham Jonathan S. Dodge
1918	John. J. Hamilton/Prescott F. Cogswell	Edward J. Delorey/ Jack H. Bean	Frank E. Woodley	Reuban F. McClellan	Jonathan S. Dodge
1920	Prescott F. Cogswell	Jack H. Bean	Frank E. Woodley	Reuban F. McClellan	Jonathan S. Dodge
1921	Prescott F. Cogswell	Jack H. Bean	Frank E. Woodley	Reuban F. McClellan	Jonathan S. Dodge/Henry W. Wright (R)
1922	Prescott F. Cogswell	Jack H. Bean	Frank E. Woodley	Reuban F. McClellan	Henry W. Wright (R)
1924	Prescott F. Cogswell	Jack H. Bean	Frank E. Woodley	Reuban F. McClellan	Henry W. Wright (R)
1926	Prescott F. Cogswell/Fred T. Beaty	Jack H. Bean	Frank E. Woodley/ Sidney T. Graves	Reuban F. McClellan	Henry W. Wright (R)
1928	Fred T. Beaty	Jack H. Bean/Frank L. Shaw (R)	Sidney T. Graves	Reuban F. McClellan	Henry W. Wright (R)
1931	Hugh A. Thatcher	Frank L. Shaw (R)	J. Don Mahaffey (R)	John R. Quinn (R)	Henry W. Wright (R)
1933	Hugh A. Thatcher	Gordon L. McDonough (R)	Harry M. Baine	John R. Quinn (R)	Roger W. Jessup (R)
1935	Herbert C. Legg (D)	Gordon L. McDonough (R)	John Anson Ford (D)	John R. Quinn (R)	Roger W. Jessup (R)
1937	Herbert C. Legg (D)	Gordon L. McDonough (R)	John Anson Ford (D)	Leland M. Ford (R)	Roger W. Jessup (R)
1939	William A. Smith	Gordon L. McDonough (R)	John Anson Ford (D)	Oscar L. Hauge (R)	Roger W. Jessup (R)
1941	William A. Smith	Gordon L. McDonough (R)	John Anson Ford (D)	Oscar L. Hauge (R)	Roger W. Jessup (R)
1943	William A. Smith	Gordon L. McDonough (R)	John Anson Ford (D)	Oscar L. Hauge (R)	Roger W. Jessup (R)
1945	William A. Smith	Leonard J. Roach (R)	John Anson Ford (D)	Raymond V. Darby (R)	Roger W. Jessup (R)
1947	William A. Smith	Leonard J. Roach (R)	John Anson Ford (D)	Raymond V. Darby (R)	Roger W. Jessup (R)
1949	William A. Smith	Leonard J. Roach (R)	John Anson Ford (D)	Raymond V. Darby (R)	Roger W. Jessup (R)
1951	Herbert C. Legg (D)	Leonard J. Roach (R)	John Anson Ford (D)	Raymond V. Darby (R)	Roger W. Jessup (R)
1953	Herbert C. Legg (D)	Kenneth Hahn (D)	John Anson Ford (D)	Burton W. Chace (R)	Roger W. Jessup (R)
1955	Herbert C. Legg (D)	Kenneth Hahn (D)	John Anson Ford (D)	Burton W. Chace (R)	Roger W. Jessup (R)
1957	Herbert C. Legg (D)	Kenneth Hahn (D)	John Anson Ford (D)	Burton W. Chace (R)	Warren M. Dorn (R)
1959	Frank G. Bonelli (D)	Kenneth Hahn (D)	Ernest E. Debs (D)	Burton W. Chace (R)	Warren M. Dorn (R)
1961	Frank G. Bonelli (D)	Kenneth Hahn (D)	Ernest E. Debs (D)	Burton W. Chace (R)	Warren M. Dorn (R)
1963	Frank G. Bonelli (D)	Kenneth Hahn (D)	Ernest E. Debs (D)	Burton W. Chace (R)	Warren M. Dorn (R)
1965	Frank G. Bonelli (D)	Kenneth Hahn (D)	Ernest E. Debs (D)	Burton W. Chace (R)	Warren M. Dorn (R)
1967	Frank G. Bonelli (D)	Kenneth Hahn (D)	Ernest E. Debs (D)	Burton W. Chace (R)	Warren M. Dorn (R)
1969	Frank G. Bonelli (D)	Kenneth Hahn (D)	Ernest E. Debs (D)	Burton W. Chace (R)	Warren M. Dorn (R)
1971	Frank G. Bonelli (D)	Kenneth Hahn (D)	Ernest E. Debs (D)	Burton W. Chace (R)	Warren M. Dorn (R)
1973	Peter F. Schabarum (R)	Kenneth Hahn (D)	Ernest E. Debs (D)	James A. Hayes (R)	Baxter Ward (D)
1975	Peter F. Schabarum (R)	Kenneth Hahn (D)	Edmund D. Edelman (D)	James A. Hayes (R)	Baxter Ward (D)
1977	Peter F. Schabarum (R)	Kenneth Hahn (D)	Edmund D. Edelman (D)	James A. Hayes (R)	Baxter Ward (D)
1979	Peter F. Schabarum (R)	Kenneth Hahn (D)	Edmund D. Edelman (D)	James A. Hayes (R)	Baxter Ward (D)
1981	Peter F. Schabarum (R)	Kenneth Hahn (D)	Edmund D. Edelman (D)	Yvonne Brathwaite Burke (D)	Michael D. Antonovich (R)
1983	Peter F. Schabarum (R)	Kenneth Hahn (D)	Edmund D. Edelman (D)	Deane Dana (R)	Michael D. Antonovich (R)
1985	Peter F. Schabarum (R)	Kenneth Hahn (D)	Edmund D. Edelman (D)	Deane Dana (R)	Michael D. Antonovich (R)
1987	Peter F. Schabarum (R)	Kenneth Hahn (D)	Edmund D. Edelman (D)	Deane Dana (R)	Michael D. Antonovich (R)
1989	Peter F. Schabarum (R)	Kenneth Hahn (D)	Edmund D. Edelman (D)	Deane Dana (R)	Michael D. Antonovich (R)
1991	Gloria Molina (D)	Kenneth Hahn (D)	Edmund D. Edelman (D)	Deane Dana (R)	Michael D. Antonovich (R)
1993	Gloria Molina (D)	Yvonne Brathwaite Burke (D)	Edmund D. Edelman (D)	Deane Dana (R)	Michael D. Antonovich (R)
1995	Gloria Molina (D)	Yvonne Brathwaite Burke (D)	Zev Yaroslavsky (D)	Deane Dana (R)	Michael D. Antonovich (R)
1997	Gloria Molina (D)	Yvonne Brathwaite Burke (D)	Zev Yaroslavsky (D)	Don Knabe (R)	Michael D. Antonovich (R)
1999	Gloria Molina (D)	Yvonne Brathwaite Burke (D)	Zev Yaroslavsky (D)	Don Knabe (R)	Michael D. Antonovich (R)
2001	Gloria Molina (D)	Yvonne Brathwaite Burke (D)	Zev Yaroslavsky (D)	Don Knabe (R)	Michael D. Antonovich (R)
2003	Gloria Molina (D)	Yvonne Brathwaite Burke (D)	Zev Yaroslavsky (D)	Don Knabe (R)	Michael D. Antonovich (R)
2005	Gloria Molina (D)	Yvonne Brathwaite Burke (D)	Zev Yaroslavsky (D)	Don Knabe (R)	Michael D. Antonovich (R)
2007	Gloria Molina (D)	Yvonne Brathwaite Burke (D)	Zev Yaroslavsky (D)	Don Knabe (R)	Michael D. Antonovich (R)
2009	Gloria Molina (D)	Mark Ridley-Thomas (D)	Zev Yaroslavsky (D)	Don Knabe (R)	Michael D. Antonovich (R)
2011	Gloria Molina (D)	Mark Ridley-Thomas (D)	Zev Yaroslavsky (D)	Don Knabe (R)	Michael D. Antonovich (R)
2013	Gloria Molina (D)	Mark Ridley-Thomas (D)	Zev Yaroslavsky (D)	Don Knabe (R)	Michael D. Antonovich (R)
2015	Hilda Solis (D)	Mark Ridley-Thomas (D)	Sheila Kuehl (D)	Don Knabe (R)	Michael D. Antonovich (R)
2017	Hilda Solis (D)	Mark Ridley-Thomas (D)	Sheila Kuehl (D)	Janice Hahn (D)	Kathryn Barger (R)
2019	Hilda Solis (D)	Mark Ridley-Thomas (D)	Sheila Kuehl (D)	Janice Hahn (D)	Kathryn Barger (R)
2021	Hilda Solis (D)	Holly Mitchell (D)	Sheila Kuehl (D)	Janice Hahn (D)	Kathryn Barger (R)
2023	Hilda Solis (D)	Holly Mitchell (D)	Lindsey Horvath (D)	Janice Hahn (D)	Kathryn Barger (R)
2025	Hilda Solis (D)	Holly Mitchell (D)	Lindsey Horvath (D)	Janice Hahn (D)	Kathryn Barger (R)

== Gallery ==
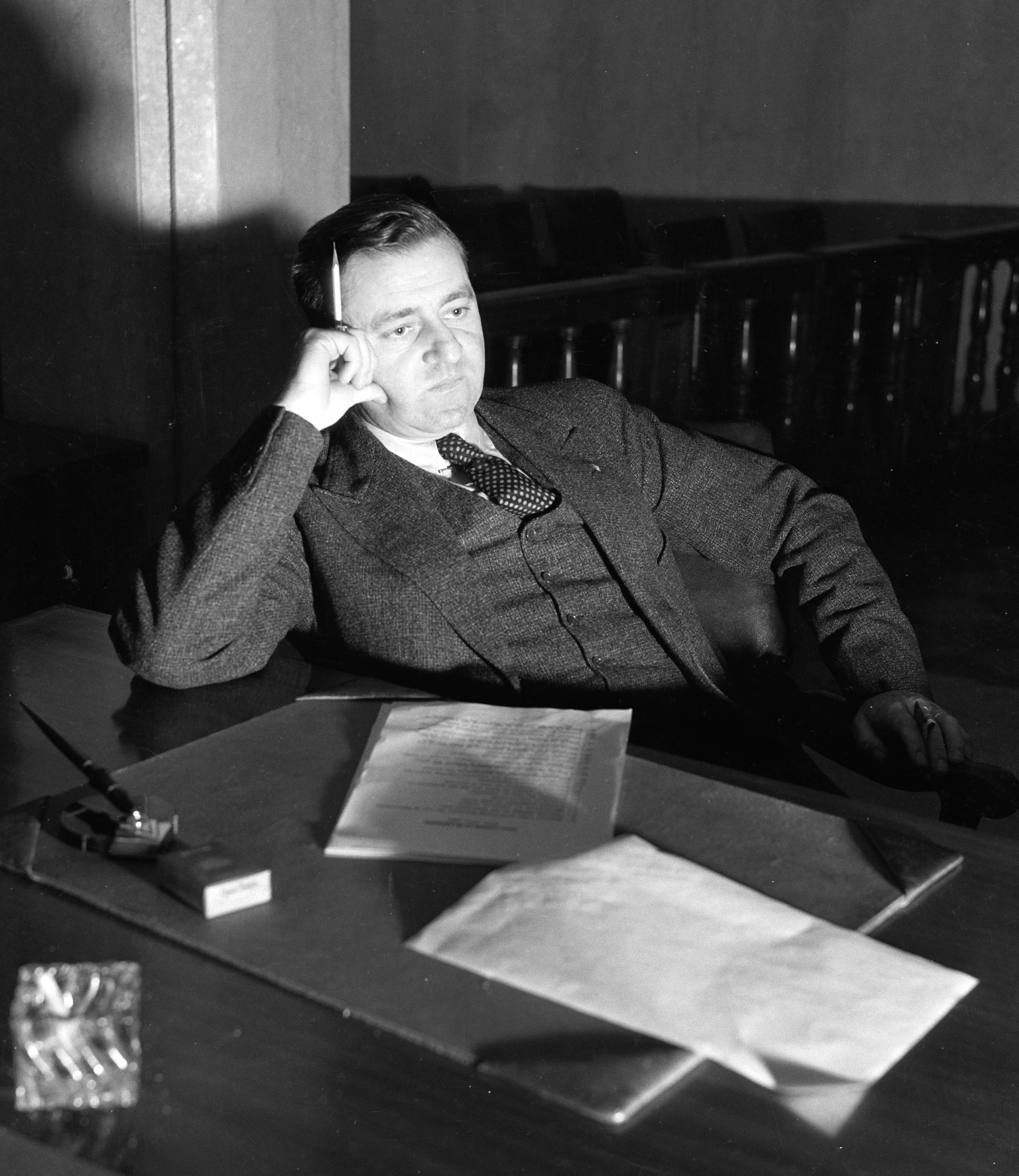
Leland M. Ford, appointed County Supervisor for Los Angeles' Fourth District, 1936

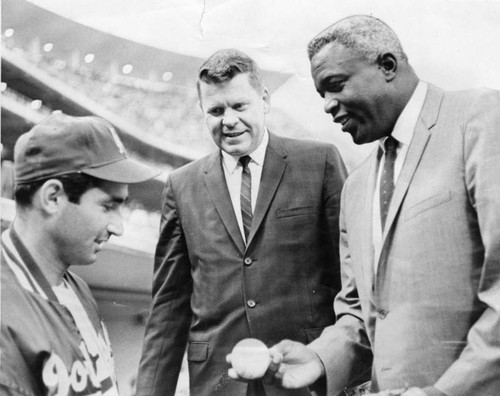
Supervisor Warren Dorn and Jackie Robinson congratulate Los Angeles Dodgers pitcher Sandy Koufax following 2-1 win over San Francisco Giants, 1965

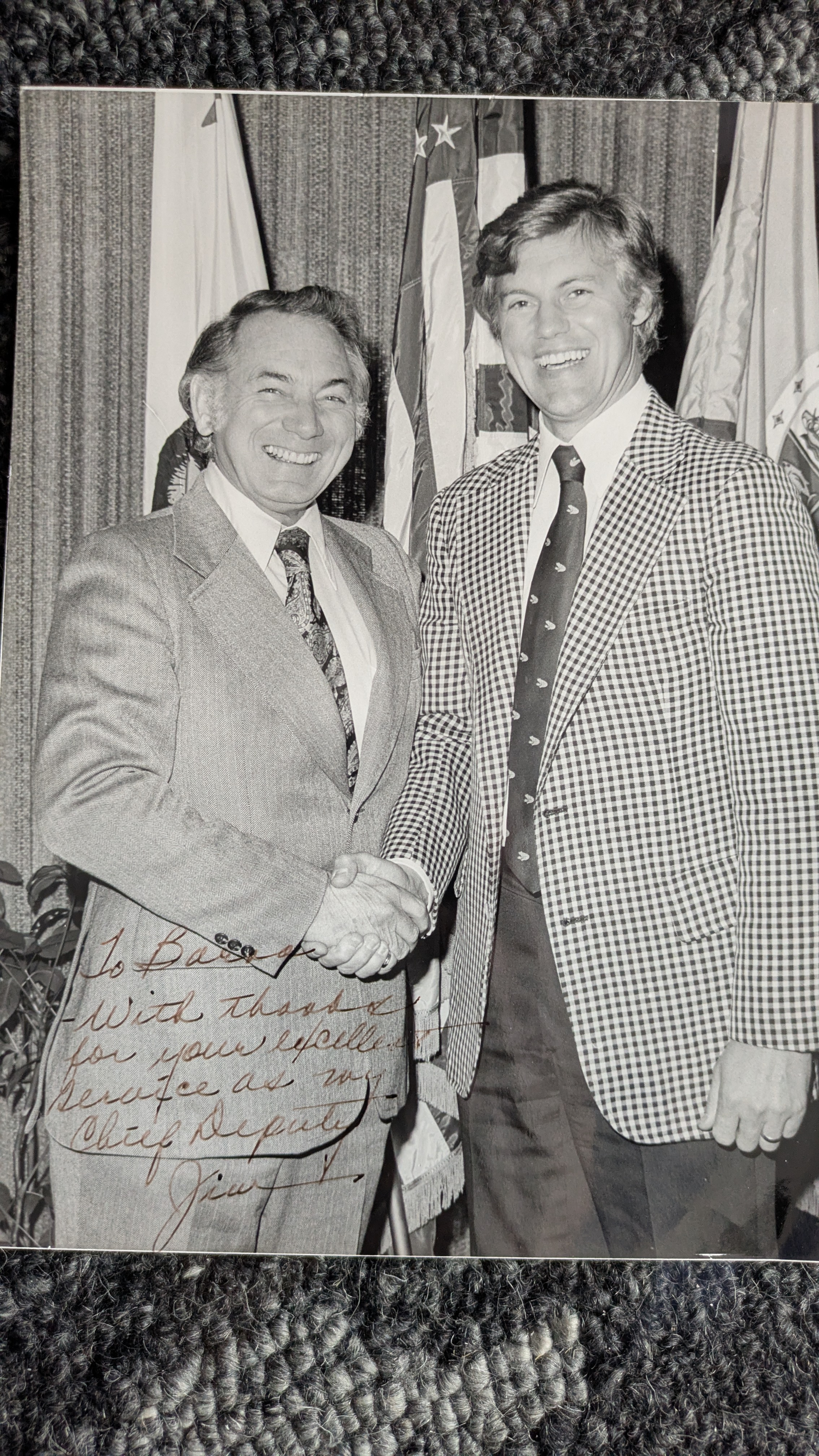
Supervisor James A. Hayes thanking his Chief Deputy Barna Szabo for his service, 1978

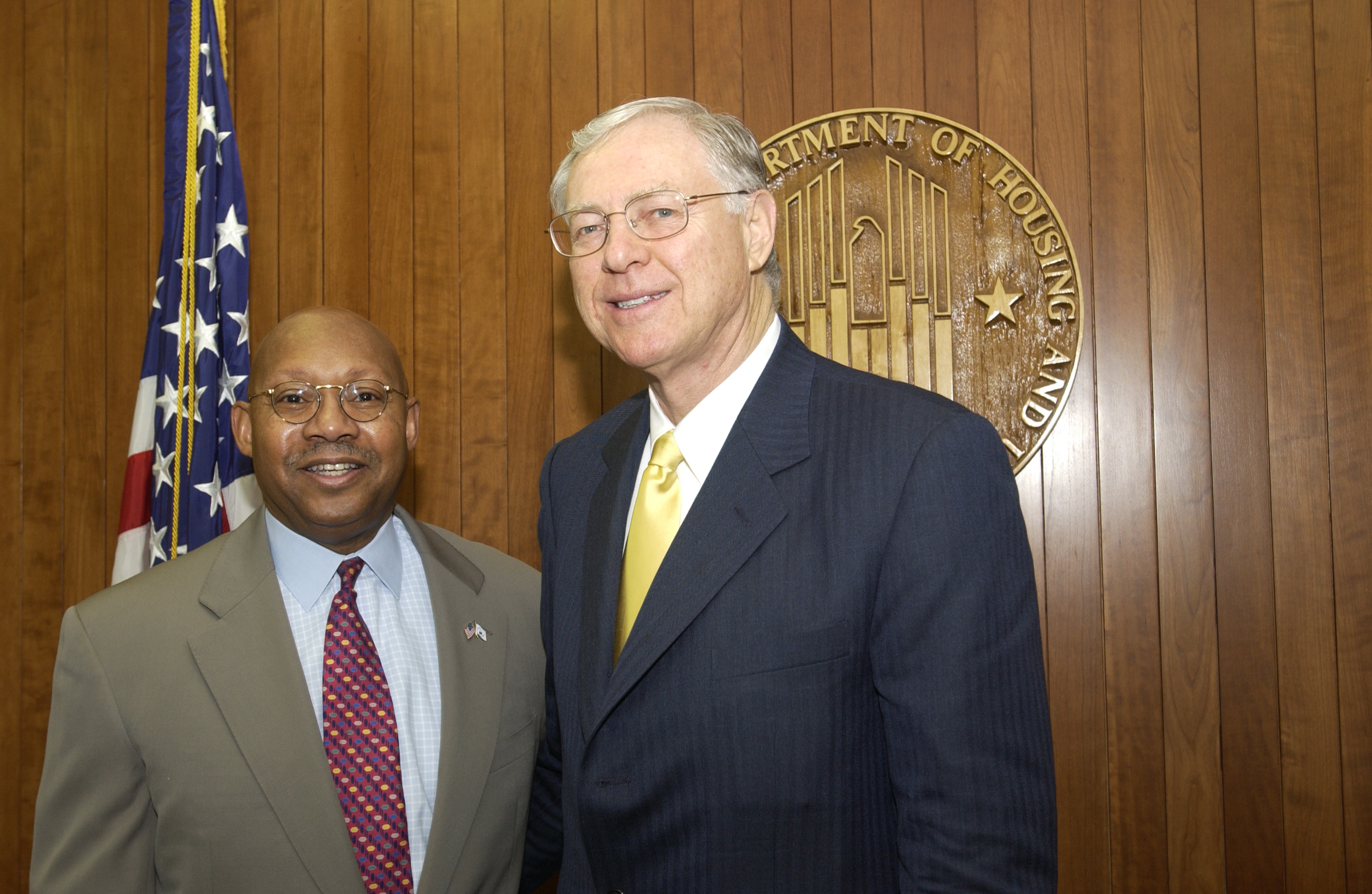
Secretary Alphonso Jackson meeting with Supervisor Michael D. Antonovich and staff at HUD Headquarters, 2006

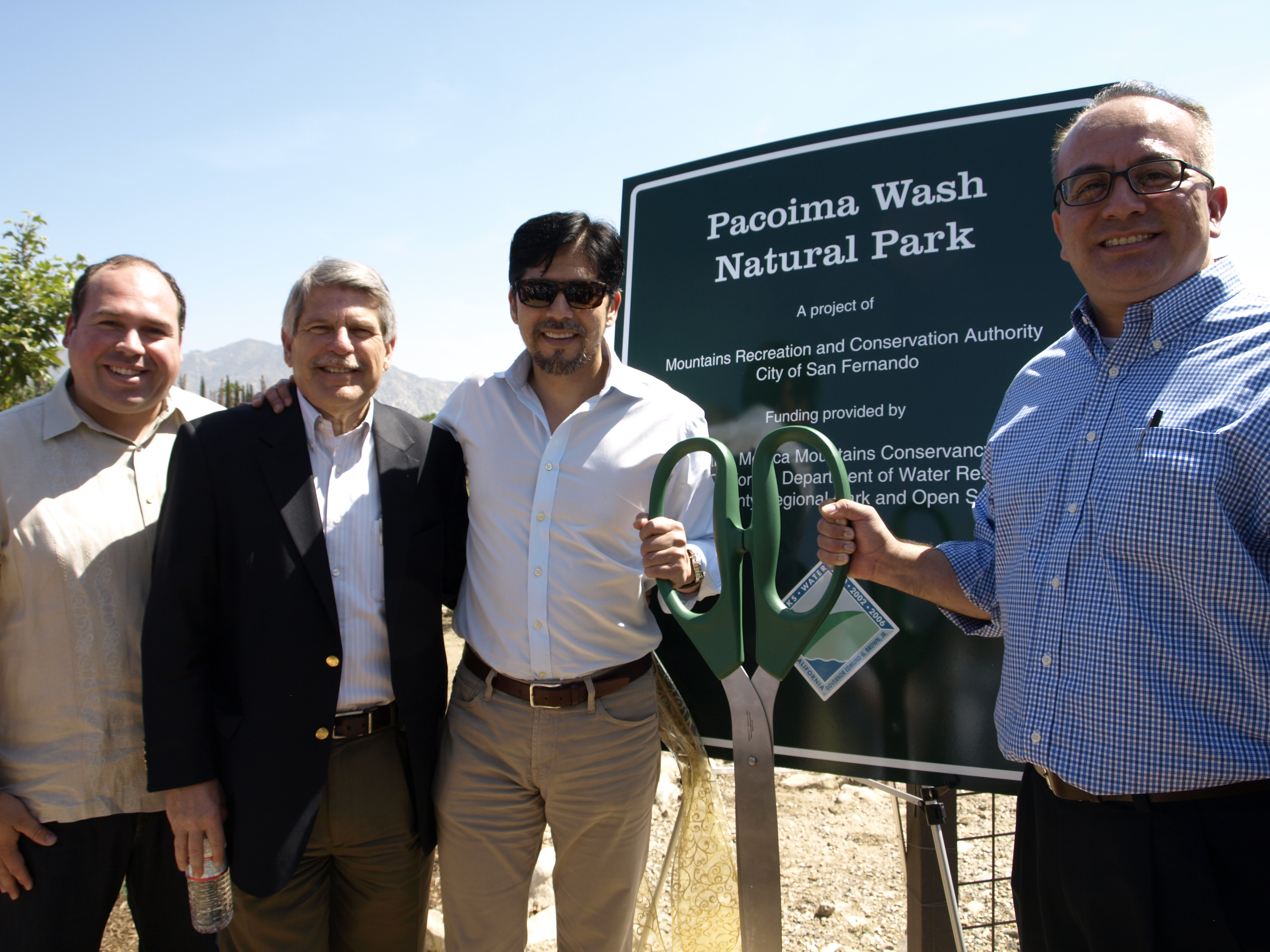
District Director Steve Veras, County Supervisor Zev Yaroslavsky, State Senator Kevin de León, and State Assemblymember Raul Bocanegra at Pacoima Wash Natural Park Grand Opening, 2014

== See also ==
- Los Angeles County, California
- Board of supervisors
