= Alfred Bush =

Alfred Bush may refer to:

- Alfred L. Bush (born 1933), American curator, writer, editor, and bibliophile
- Alfred Louis Bush (1849–1902), American industrialist and politician in Los Angeles County, California
