= Douglas Kent Hall =

American writer and photographer (1938–2008)

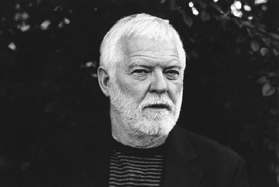
- Born: December 12, 1938; Vernal, Utah, U.S.
- Died: March 30, 2008 (aged 69); Albuquerque, New Mexico, U.S.
- Education: Brigham Young University; Iowa Writers' Workshop
- Occupations: Writer; photographer
- Spouse(s): Claire Nicholson (1959–1970); Dawn Claire Davidson (1971–2008, his death)
- Children: Devon Hall (b. 1980)
- Writing career
- Language: English
- Period: 1955–2008

Douglas Kent Hall (December 12, 1938 – March 30, 2008) was an American writer and photographer. His writing mostly focused on fiction, poetry, non-fiction, essays, and screenplays. His first published photographs were of Jimi Hendrix and Jim Morrison, and in 1974 his first exhibition was at the Whitney Museum of American Art in New York.

Hall published twenty-five books, including two with Arnold Schwarzenegger. His photographs cover subjects such as rock and roll, musicians, rodeo, cowboys, prison, flamenco, bodybuilders, the U.S.-Mexico border, the American West, New Mexico, New York City, Japan, Brazil, Mexico, Great Britain, Greece, Russia, Native Americans, writers, and artists. Hall's work also included collaborations with Larry Bell, Bruce Nauman, Terry Allen, and his son Devon Hall.

In 2008, at the time of Hall's unexpected death, solo exhibitions of his photographs hung concurrently at the Harwood Museum of Art, Taos, New Mexico; the Riva Yares Gallery, Santa Fe, New Mexico; the University Art Museum, University of New Mexico, Albuquerque, and the Roswell Museum and Art Center, Roswell, New Mexico.

== Early life and education ==
Hall was born in Vernal, Utah to Phyllis Hiatt and Charles William "Peck" Hall. He was the oldest of two children. While Peck Hall was serving in the Navy during World War II, his marriage to Phyllis broke up, and the two boys started living with their maternal grandmother, Beulah Perry. Hall spent his elementary and high school years on rural farms in the Vernal area with his grandparents. He raised sheep and cows that he exhibited and sold at county fairs. Hall participated in rodeo contests during his high school years.

At the age of seventeen, Hall entered Utah State University, Logan to study creative writing. He transferred to the University of Utah in Salt Lake City and then to Brigham Young University where he earned his bachelor's degree in English in 1960. At BYU Hall, Hall made friends with Alfred L. Bush and David Stires. Bush became the Curator of Western Americana at the Firestone Library, Princeton University, and Stires became a publishing executive. Hall's undergraduate years included the study of the creative process with Brewster Ghiselin, editor of the book The Creative Process. Hall married Claire Nicholson of Boise, Idaho between his junior and senior years at BYU. The two remained married for ten years. Hall was accepted into the Writer's Workshop at the University of Iowa. For three years, he worked as a special assistant to Paul Engle, director of the program. While at the Writer's Workshop, Hall befriended, among others, Mark Strand, Galway Kinnell, W. S. Merwin, Robert Bly, and Adrian Mitchell. Hall wrote and published while at Iowa.

== Early career ==
In 1963, Hall commenced a position at the University of Portland teaching Creative Writing and Literature. Hall and Claire moved to Portland, Oregon, in 1964. During his time at the University of Portland, Hall brought poets to the school for readings, including Allen Ginsberg, W. H. Auden, Anaïs Nin, Gary Snyder, Robert Duncan, William Stafford, and Robert Bly. At this time a friend lent Hall a camera and he taught himself photography, studying photographic technique and style. He photographed poets and the group of artists he befriended in Portland, including Lee Kelly, Carl Morris, and Hilda Morris.

Hall's increasing interest in photography led to freelance photographic work. He photographed Jimi Hendrix and Jim Morrison of the Doors for Sun Music, makers of amplifiers. He received commercial and magazine photographic assignments and realized he could dedicate himself to his writing and photography, which led him to leave the world of academia.

In 1967, Hall traveled throughout England, France, Italy, Spain, Morocco, and Portugal with his cameras. He shot his first images in the Dark Landscapes series. In 1968, Hall moved from Portland to London and continued work in advertising and on his series of artist and writer portraits and his art photography. He began formulating the idea of Passing, which dominated most of the philosophy behind his personal work.

== Writing and photography career ==
Hall and his wife moved from London to New York City in 1968. He continued to photograph rock and roll stars, which resulted in the publication of Rock: A World Bold as Love, released later in paperback as The Superstars: In Their Own Words. In New York, Hall continued writing. He published his first novel, On the Way to the Sky, in 1972. This book fictionalized Hall's childhood years in Vernal, Utah, and his relatives. Hall's time spent in the world of rock and roll led to his novel Rock and Roll Retreat Blues, published in 1974.

While driving across the country with Alfred Bush in 1969, Hall shot his first Passing series. In 1971, he developed the first negatives for Passing II.

Hall's marriage to Claire dissolved in 1970. He returned briefly to Portland, Oregon, and worked doing commercial photography jobs and writing. He met his future second wife, Dawn Claire Davidson, a fashion coordinator, in May 1971. The following December, the two moved to New York and set up residence and studio in a loft on 21st Street and 7th Avenue.

In the 1970s, Hall lived in New York but spent much time traveling. His work included writing a book about rodeo titled Let Er Buck; writing and codirecting a feature documentary film about rodeo titled The Great American Cowboy, which won an Academy Award for Best Feature-Length Documentary; and publishing a photography book titled Rodeo, which was followed in the early 1980s by another book about cowboys, this one about ranch cowboys, titled Working Cowboys. Mark Strand writes, "These cowboys, as opposed to urban cowboys, drugstore cowboys, rodeo cowboys, or movie cowboys, stay on horseback all day long working cattle. And when they stand in front of the camera—in Hall's best photos, they are standing, looking straight into the camera lens—their detached way of life shows." The 1970s also saw the publication of Hall's second novel, Rock and Roll Retreat Blues. In 1974, Hall exhibited his photographs for the first time at the Whitney Museum of American Art in New York. The exhibition and accompanying catalog, Photography in America, is where the public first viewed his photograph, Mesquite, Texas.

During the latter half of the 1970s and the early 1980s, Hall worked on books collaboratively. In 1975, Hall's literary agent, Bob Dattila, asked him if he would be interested in working on a project with bodybuilder Arnold Schwarzenegger. Hall and Schwarzenegger published two books, Arnold: The Education of a Bodybuilder and Arnold's Bodyshaping for Women. Arnold: The Education of a Bodybuilder was on the New York Times Best Seller list for eleven weeks in 1978. In 2002, Sports Illustrated included the Hall/Schwarzenegger collaboration as number 71 on their "Top 100 Sports Books of All Time". During the writing and photographing of Bodyshaping for Women, Hall became acquainted with female bodybuilder Lisa Lyon; the friendship led to the publication of their book Lisa Lyon's BodyMagic. The Incredible Lou Ferrigno with bodybuilder Lou Ferrigno rounded out Hall's collaborative publishing ventures with bodybuilders.

In 1977, Hall and his partner moved from New York to the village of Alcalde, New Mexico. After living together for more than six years, they were married in Santa Fe on July 23, 1977. In 1980, their son Devon was born.

Hall traveled throughout the Southwest and along the Mexico–U.S. border in the 1980s gathering material for two photographic books. The Border: Life on the Line introduced Hall to the varied types of people who live and work on both sides of the border. The book includes many color photographs. Frontier Spirit: Early Churches of the Southwest also includes many color images.

In 1992, Hall began printing with platinum. Also in the early 1990s, Hall traveled to Saint Petersburg, Russia, to document the Hermitage Museum's art school for children. He photographed in the students' homes and at the museum. During this period Hall also traveled to Minas Gerais, Brazil, to document the region's gold and gemstone miners.

In the mid-1990s, Hall began producing his Zen Ghost Horses series with images of Peruvian Paso and Clydesdale horses exposed onto handmade paper that was brushed with emulsion. Hall embellished the works with gold leaf, Chinese and Japanese calligraphy, and acrylics. Taking color images shot along the Mexico-U.S. border, Hall created a suite of Artes de Caja (art boxes). These pieces incorporate color photographs, poems, milagros, objects picked up while traveling the border, and pages from Mexican graphic novelettes into and on hand-painted wooden wine boxes. The Albuquerque Museum showed fifteen of the border boxes for four months as part of a tribute exhibition for Hall in 2008.

After being awarded the New Mexico Governor's Award for Excellence in the Arts in 2005, Hall's In New Mexico Light, a compilation of his images taken over a forty-year time span, was published by the Museum of New Mexico Press.

In 2002, Hall's first collection of poems was published in Visionary. The book also contains an extended auto-memoir/poem.

== Martial arts ==
Hall began studying and practicing Kaju Kenpo karate in Santa Fe in 1986, receiving his Nidan black belt in 1998. He taught karate in Española, New Mexico, until 2002. While continuing to practice karate, Hall also incorporated Tai Chi into his daily spiritual practice. When photographer Joyce Tenneson selected Hall in 2004 for inclusion in her book Amazing Men, she photographed him working with martial arts weapons.

== Death ==
Hall died suddenly at his home in Albuquerque on March 30, 2008; the cause of death was described as "a cardiac incident." He was survived by his wife, Dawn, and son, Devon Hall, a composer and pianist.

== Writing ==
Hall's first writing was fiction. His first novel, On the Way to the Sky, is set in Utah and explores themes that surface frequently in his work: small-town life, surviving a broken home, Mormonism, hunting and fishing, music, and rodeo.

His second novel, Rock and Roll Retreat Blues, is a commentary on the world of rock and roll and the culture it creates. According to a Publishers Weekly review,

The book is chock-full of familiar contemporary figures—Hells Angels, revolutionaries, people spaced out on religion or brown rice or drugs, even such exotics as the "plaster casters." Yet Hall is fresh and funny, and he makes Artie's [the protagonist's] search for his own psyche very real and very much a part of our times. (Excerpts ran in the Penthouse).

The third novel, The Master of Oakwindsor, set in 1908 England, explores the clash between rural England and a new and darker industrial Britain and between two families.

Hall wrote numerous books of nonfiction, which include his photographs, rodeo, cowboy life, bodybuilding, prison, the historic churches of the Southwest, and the border between the United States and Mexico.

== Photographs ==
Princeton University curator Alfred L. Bush writes:

Unlike the majority of the photographic explorers, who are continually clicking away at the American West, Douglas Hall's camera is firmly rooted in the region's very center.

The protagonist in the Sam Shepard story "San Juan Bautista" says: "I'm more into faces—people; Robert Frank, Douglas Kent Hall, guys like that." On the occasion of the exhibition in Santa Fe of Os Brasileiros (The Brazilians), David Bell notes,

Hall, who has recently made several trips to Brazil and the Amazon, takes as his subjects not only the miners who were his first objective but families, farmers, and students, too. The result is a composite portrait of a people who in most cases appear to give themselves with equal abandon to the camera and to life.

Mark Strand noted in Vogue magazine,

There is nothing provisional about Hall's enterprise; it is both broad and, in individual photographs, scrupulously resolved. His pictures have an edge, a magical certainty about them that not only justifies but also honors their subjects, no matter how odd or how exploited.

When discussing the complex relationship of a photograph to history, Hall noted to the author of Photography: New Mexico, Kristin Barendsen,

that a photograph imparts the illusion of permanence, when in fact the scene depicted no longer exists. What's more, he said, the photograph does not represent exactly what its maker saw. It takes on a life of its own, and because each viewer experiences it differently, the image reflects an essence of the viewer. 'That's not my photograph,' he said, pointing to his most famous image, Mesquite, TX, hanging in his studio. 'It belongs to the viewer.'

=== Transition to digital photography ===
Hall started out with a 35mm camera, added a 2 1/4 square format camera, and kept working with those two formats using Nikons, Leica Cameras, and Hasselblads. In the mid-1990s, he added digital cameras to his arsenal. In a Rangefinder magazine article, Hall said to author/photographer Paul Slaughter:

I am using a Nikon D70s digital SLR and I always carry a Nikon point-and-shoot that fits into my pocket. It does interesting things to the color (which I like). I also use an Olympus C-5050 digital camera that has a wonderful f/1.8 lens. My new series, Travel, is all digital color and I am fascinated by the images because they are different from anything I've done before. The creative part is the same, the tools are the tools—the cameras.

Hall had five external hard drives. He said to Slaughter,

I am a bit haphazard in my approach to work. I am more intuitive than anything else. That is part of my imagery evolvement.

Hall used Adobe's Photoshop and Lightroom software programs for after-capture processing and did his own printing, both digital and traditional. He had four Epson inkjet printers. For digital printing, he favored watercolor papers. He told Slaughter:

I am often upset that I can no longer readily find traditional printing supplies... That concerns me more than thinking about where photography is going. I look at the photographs being done and feel that the new digital work is less convincing than film work. But I feel certain that photographers such as Edward Weston would have brought a special look to digital. I hope I am doing the same. In the end, with either digital or film, I choose what pleases my eye. I think the world of professional photography is much like it has always been, full of challenge.

== Archives ==
The Douglas Kent Hall papers are held at Princeton University Library, Rare Books and Special Collections. The collection, which is open to researchers, consists of 101 boxes, spanning 93 linear feet.

== Awards ==
- J. Marinus Jensen Short Story Contest, Brigham Young University, 1959
- Academy Award for Best Documentary Feature, Great American Cowboy, 1974
- Honorary Chair, College of Notre Dame's Sister Catherine Julie Cunningham visiting scholar award. Fine Arts Department, College of Notre Dame, San Francisco, Spring 1997
- Distinguished Alumnus of Uintah High School, Vernal, Utah, 1999
- New Mexico Governor's Award for Excellence in the Arts, 2005
- Medici Gold Medal Career Award, Florence Biennale Internazionale Dell'Arte Contemporanea, 2005
- Finalist, New Mexico Book Awards, art books, for In New Mexico Light, 2008

== Quotations ==
- The camera, the split-second blink of the shutter, taught me that time does not pass. It is we who pass. We pass through time and we waste only ourselves. Time is indifferent to us and to our folly. Time remains the one certainty we have, the fixed and constant factor – more concrete than life, more permanent than space.

== Works ==
=== Books ===
- Rock: A World Bold As Love (1970) ISBN 0-8092-9230-0
- The Superstars: In Their Own Words (1970) ISBN 0-8256-6020-3
- On the Way to the Sky (1972) ISBN 0-8415-0125-4
- Let 'Er Buck! (1973) ISBN 0-8415-0274-9
- Rock and Roll Retreat Blues (1974) ISBN 0-380-00159-4
- Rodeo (1975) ISBN 0345248775, ISBN 978-0345248770
- The Master of Oakwindsor (1976) ISBN 0-690-01171-7
- Ski with Billy Kidd (1976) ISBN 0-8092-8310-7
- Van People: The Great American Rainbow Boogie (1977) ISBN 0-690-01418-X, ISBN 0-690-01452-X (pbk.)
- Arnold: The Education of a Body Builder (with Arnold Schwarzenegger) (1977) ISBN 0-671-22879-X
- Bodyshaping for Women (with Arnold Schwarzenegger) (1979) ISBN 0-671-24301-2
- Bodymagic (with Lisa Lyon) (1981) ISBN 0553014412, ISBN 978-0553014419
- The Incredible Lou Ferrigno (1982) ISBN 0-671-42863-2
- Working Cowboys (1984) ISBN 0-03-070418-9
- The Border: Life on the Line (1988) ISBN 0-89659-685-0
- In Prison (1988) ISBN 0-8050-0592-7
- Passing Through: Western Meditations of Douglas Kent Hall (1989) ISBN 0-87358-485-6
- Frontier Spirit: Early Churches of the Southwest (1990) ISBN 0-89659-914-0
- New Mexico: Voices in an Ancient Landscape (1995) ISBN 0-8050-1233-8
- Prison Tattoos (1997) ISBN 0-312-15195-0, ISBN 978-0-312-15195-9
- Albuquerque 2000 (2000)
- The Thread of New Mexico (2001) ISBN 978-0-9779910-7-5
- Visionary (2002) ISBN 0-938631-46-2
- Noches Perdidas, 2003
- In New Mexico Light (2007) ISBN 978-0-89013-501-3
- City Light: Douglas Kent Hall's New York, forthcoming

=== Films ===
- The Great American Cowboy, screenplay and narration
- Wheels of Fire, director and screenplay
- Arnold and Maria, interviewee, E! Network, 2003
- Arnold Schwarzenegger: Hollywood Hero, interviewee
- In the Spirit of Crazy Horse, screenplay (with Justin Ackerman)
- The Great Joe Bob, screenplay, based on a song by Terry Allen
- Sirens, photographer
- Fool for Love, photographer
- Roosters, photographer
- Tattoo Nation, still photographs
- Robert Bly: A Thousand Years of Joy, A Film by Haydn Reiss, still photographs

=== Photography ===
Public collections

- JP Morgan Chase Art Collection
- Center for Southwest Research, University of New Mexico, Albuquerque, NM
- The Albuquerque Museum, Albuquerque, NM
- Amarillo Museum of Art, Amarillo, TX
- Sheldon Museum of Art, Lincoln, NE
- Philadelphia Museum of Art, Philadelphia, PA
- Princeton University Library, Princeton, NJ
- Princeton University Art Museum, Princeton, NJ
- Millicent Rogers Museum, Taos, NM
- Bibliothèque nationale de France, Paris
- New Mexico Museum of Art (formerly the Museum of Fine Arts), Santa Fe, NM
- El Paso Museum of Archaeology, El Paso, TX
- Roswell Museum and Art Center, Roswell NM
- New Mexico State University Art Museum, Las Cruces, NM
- Midwestern State University, Wichita Falls, TX
- Brooklyn Museum, Brooklyn, NY
- The Museum of Fine Arts, Houston, Texas
- Hotel Erwin, Venice Beach, CA, two collections
- Rose Art Museum, Brandeis University, Waltham, MA
- City of Phoenix, AZ
- New Mexico State Capitol, Santa Fe, NM
- Museum of the American West, Autry National Center, Los Angeles, CA
- McAllen International Museum, McAllen, TX
- The Martin Foundation, San Francisco, CA
- Albuquerque International Sunport Collection, NM
- University of New Mexico, Los Alamos, NM
- University of New Mexico Art Museum, Albuquerque, NM
- University of New Mexico, HSC Art Collection, NM
- Panhandle Plains Historical Museum, Canyon, TX
- University of California, Los Angeles, Arts Library, CA
- National Cowboy Museum, Oklahoma City, OK
- Henry Art Gallery, University of Washington, Seattle
- City of Phoenix, AZ
- Harwood Museum of Art, Taos, NM
- Palace of the Governors, New Mexico History Museum, Santa Fe, NM
- National Museum of African American History and Culture, a Smithsonian Institution, Washington, DC

Notable photographs

- Mesquite, Texas
- Jimi Hendrix Seattle
- Taos Man
- Bareback Rider
- Tina Turner
- Andy Warhol at the Factory
- Arnold Schwarzenegger
- Horse, La Villita
- Generations, Navajo
- Sandia
- Jim Morrison, Portland
- Calf Roping, Pendleton
- Picuris Man
- Bell Spur
- Paris, 1980

== Other books, catalogs, and portfolios about Hall or with contribution by Hall ==
- "James Joyce at 71: Rue du Cardinal Lemoine," essay by Douglas Kent Hall, Brigham Young University Studies 3, nos. 3–4 (Spring–Summer 1961): pp. 43–49.
- Photography in America, New York, Random House, 1974, pp. 246–47. ISBN 0-517-39128-7
- "Love of Traction," essay by Douglas Kent Hall. Esquire, September 1976, p. 76.
- "Van Art," essay and photographs by Douglas Kent Hall. Esquire, September 1977, p. 115.
- Boundary 2: A Journal of Postmodern Literature, Binghamton, NY, 1982
- The Cowboy, New York, Stewart, Tabori, & Chang, 1983, pp. 226–27. ISBN 0-941434-25-7
- Princeton University Library Chronicle, vol. XLIV, Spring 1983, portfolio of Matachines photographs
- Photoflexion, New York, St. Martin's Press, 1984
- Third Western States Exhibition, New York, The Brooklyn Museum; Santa Fe, Western States Arts Foundation, 1986, Library of Congress Catalogue No. 85–052333
- 3 / Photographers: Douglas Kent Hall, Bruce Berman, and Roger Manley, Roswell Museum and Art Center, NM, 1986
- Images of Spirit and Vision, Santa Fe, NM, Museum of New Mexico Press, 1987, p. 74. ISBN 0-89013-169-4
- Die Gleichzeitigkeit des Anderen, Stuttgart, Germany, Verlag Gerd Hatje, 1987
- Way Out West, Tokyo, Japan, Treville Publishing Co., 1990, 21 pages. ISBN 978-4-8457-0575-7 C0072
- Electric Gypsy, London, England, Heinemann and Heinemann, 1990, color p. xv. ISBN 0-312-05861-6
- Zero Mass, The Art of Eric Orr, Stockholm, Sweden, Propexus, 1990, pp. 284–85. ISBN 91-87952-03-3
- Esquire/Japan, Working Cowboys and Artist Profile, Tokyo, Japan, July 1991
- Southwest Profile, Portfolio of Fourteen Photographs; Santa Fe, NM, August, September, October 1991
- Southwest Profile, Portfolio of Nine Photographs, Santa Fe, NM, November, December, January 1991/1992
- The Jimi Hendrix Concerts, Bella Godiva Music, Inc., 1991, pp. 18, 36, 96, 122, 154. ISBN 0-7935-0102-4
- Radio One, Hendrix, Bella Godiva Music, Inc., 1991, all photographs. ISBN 0-7935-0307-8
- The Doors: The Complete Lyrics, A Delta Book, 1992, pp. 88, 93, 105, 110, 166. ISBN 0-385-30840-X
- Imago, vols. 3–5, Japan, Portfolio, 1992
- Walking Swiftly, edited by Thomas R. Smith, HarperPerennial, 1992, photograph of Robert Bly, p. 73. ISBN 0-06-097526-1
- Chaco Past, Boxed Portfolio of Douglas Kent Hall photographs of Chaco Canyon, 1992
- Chaco Future, Boxed Portfolio of Douglas Kent Hall photographs of Chaco Canyon, 1992
- Photographer's Forum, Exclusive magazine interview and portfolio of eight photographs, November 1992
- a simple story (Juárez), Terry Allen, Ohio State University, Wexner Center, 1992
- The Photograph and the American Indian, by Alfred L. Bush and Lee Clark Mitchell, Princeton University Press, 1994 ISBN 0-691-03489-3
- The Paintings of William Lumpkins, "William Lumpkins in Roswell," catalog essay, Roswell Museum and Art Center, NM, 1995
- Understanding Art, Fourth Edition, by Lois Fichner-Rathus, Prentice Hall, 1995
- It's Only Rock and Roll: Rock and Roll Currents in Contemporary Art, by David S. Rubin, Munich, Prestel, 1995. ISBN 3791316273, ISBN 978-3791316277
- The Inner World of Jimi Hendrix, by Monika Dannemann, St. Martin's Press, New York, 1995. ISBN 0-312-13738-9
- Jimi Hendrix: The Ultimate Experience, by Adrian Boot and Chris Salewicz, London, Boxtree, 1995. ISBN 0-7522-0710-5
- Philadelphia Photo Review, portfolio, Prison Tattoos, the Stations of the Body, volume 19, number 4, Fall 1996
- Westerns, by Lee Clark Mitchell, University of Chicago Press, 1996. ISBN 0-226-53234-8
- A Borderless Vision: A Douglas Kent Hall Retrospective, catalog for Solo Exhibition, Wiegand Gallery, Belmont, CA, 1997
- Larry Bell: Zones of Experience, two essays, Albuquerque, The Albuquerque Museum, 1997, Library of Congress Catalogue No. 94–12045
- Eyewitness: The Illustrated Jimi Hendrix Concerts, 1969–1970, compiled by Ben Valkhoff, Up from the Skies Unlimited, Nijmegen, the Netherlands, 1997, p. 80. ISBN 90-803803-1-8
- Master Breasts, Aperture, New York, NY, 1998, pp. 4–5. ISBN 0-89381-803-8
- History of Photography: A Bibliography of Books, vol. 4, Laurent Roosens and Luc Salu, Mansell, 1999, p. 140. ISBN 0-7201-2354-2.
- 23. International Biennial of Graphic Arts/Mednarodni Graficni Bienale, Ljubljana, Slovenia, 1999
- Leslie Marmon SIlko, University of New Mexico Press, 1999, cover photograph. ISBN 0-8263-2033-3
- "Toughest Indian in the World," by Sherman Alexie, The New Yorker, June 21, 1999, p. 96, Douglas Kent Hall photograph
- Tamarind: Forty Years, by Marge Devon, University of New Mexico Press, 2000, p. 145. ISBN 0-8263-2072-4
- Spider Woman: A Story of Navajo Weavers and Chanters, Gladys Reichard, University of New Mexico Press, 2001, cover photograph. ISBN 0-8263-1793-6
- Alvin Lee & Ten Years After, by Herb Staehr, Hingham, MA, Free Street Press, 2001. ISBN 0-9708700-0-0
- New Mexico Magazine, Master's Showcase, July 2001
- Chokecherries 2001 (Cover photo), SOMOS, Taos, NM, 2002
- Magnifico: Art of Albuquerque: A World of Paint and Polish, catalog essay, August 2002
- Tony Price Atomic Artist, catalog essay, The Museum of Fine Arts, Santa Fe, NM, "Dancing to the Music: Tony Price in Retrospect," November 2002. ISBN 0-9675106-7-8; ISBN 978-0-9675106-7-5
- The Book of War: White Sands, collaborative multimedia artist book. Portfolio of Douglas Kent Hall photographs of White Sands, and DVD/CD of Douglas Kent Hall poetry read by Douglas Kent Hall with music composed and recorded by Devon Hall, composer, 2002
- The Social Lens, University Art Museum, Albuquerque, NM, July 2003
- Just You Just Me: The Art of Lily Fenichel, catalog essay, Harwood Museum of Art, Taos, NM, 2004. ISBN 0-9741023-9-3; ISBN 978-0-9741023-9-9
- Amazing Men, photographs by Joyce Tenneson, Bulfinch, New York, 2004. ISBN 0-8212-2855-2
- Classic Hendrix, Genesis Publications, Surrey, England, 2004 ISBN 0-904351-90-4; ISBN 978-0-904351-90-3
- New Mexico 24/7, DK Publishing, New York, 2004, pp. 65, 66, 70–71, 107, 110, 120–21. ISBN 0-7566-0071-5
- Dugout, by Terry Allen, Austin, University of Texas Press, 2005. ISBN 0-292-70686-3
- Carl*s Cars Magazine, Photographic Portfolio and Interview, "Van People." Issue 12, Summer 2005, Oslo, Norway
- Room Full of Mirrors: A Biography of Jimi Hendrix, by Charles Cross, Hyperion, 2005, insert p. 9. ISBN 1-4013-0028-6
- Carl*s Cars Magazine, Cover and Photographic Portfolio, "Passing." Issue 14, Winter 2005, Oslo, Norway
- Biennale Internazionale Dell'arte Contemporanea, Quinta Edizione, Florence Biennale, Italy, 2005
- Essentials of Argument, by Nancy V. Wood, Pearson/Prentice Hall, NJ, 2006, border photograph. ISBN 0-205-82702-0
- Hope: Preserving Tibetan Culture, Dalai Lama Benefit, CoolGreySeven/Dalai Lama Norbulinka Institute, 2006
- Jimi Hendrix: An Illustrated Experience, Janie L. Hendrix and John McDermott, New York and London, Atria Books, 2007. ISBN 978-0-7432-9769-1; ISBN 0-7432-9769-5
- Green, Inaugural Exhibition, essay by Sharyn Udall, 516 Arts, Albuquerque, NM, 2007
- El Palacio, excerpt from In New Mexico Light, 6 pages, Fall 2007
- Iconic America, Tommy Hilfiger with George Lois, New York, Rizzoli/Universe, November 2007. ISBN 978-0-7893-1573-1
- Insights: The Portraiture Of Charles R. Rushton, Nabee-Gerrer Museum of Art, Norman Oklahoma, 2008. ISBN 978-0-615-17331-3
- Titans: Muhammad Ali and Arnold Schwarzenegger, photographs by Al Satterwhite, essay contributions by Douglas Kent Hall, Dalton Watson Fine Art Books, 2008. ISBN 978-1-85443-231-5
- Mass: Of This World: The Art of Alan Paine Radebaugh, Radebaugh Fine Art, Albuquerque 2008
- Photography: New Mexico, essays by Kristin Barendsen, Fresco Fine Art Publishers, 2008. ISBN 978-1-934491-10-2
- Thirty Year Selected Retrospective, Midwestern State University Art Gallery, Wichita Falls, TX, 2008
- Illumination: The Paintings of Georgia O'Keeffe, Agnes Pelton, Agnes Martin, and Florence Miller Pierce, Orange County Museum of Art, Newport Beach, CA, 2009. ISBN 978-1-85894-481-4
- Rangefinder, portfolio of eight photographs, article by Paul Slaughter, March 2009
- Raymond Carver: A Life, Carl Sklenicka, Scribner, 2009. ISBN 978-0-7432-6245-3
- Terry Allen, University of Texas Press, 2010. ISBN 978-0-292-72246-0
- College of Notre Dame People: Douglas Kent Hall, Textstream, 2010. ISBN 9781156898840; ISBN 1156898846
- Day out of Days, Sam Shepard, Vintage Books, 2011, p. 50. ISBN 9780307277824. See also The Wall Street Journal, December 2–3, 2017, Books section.
- Perspectives on Argument, by Nancy V. Wood and James Miller, Pearson Education, NJ, 2011, border photograph. ISBN 0-205-06033-1
- The Rolling Stones in Portugal, Rolando Rebolo, Zebra Publicações, 2011
- Larry Bell, Carré d'Arte–Musée d'art contemporain de Nîmes, France, 2011. ISBN 978-2-84066-442-0
- Princeton University Library Chronicle, vol. LXXIII, Autumn 2011, announcement of the acquisition of the Douglas Kent Hall Papers
- Hendrix on Hendrix: Encounters and Interviews with Jimi Hendrix, Steven Roby, Chicago Review Press, 2012. ISBN 978-1-61374-322-5
- Total Recall, Arnold Schwarzenegger, Simon and Schuster, 2012, pp. 226–27. ISBN 978-1-4516-6243-6
- "Top Five Iconic Music Photos," photo of Eric Clapton and Ginger Baker by Douglas Kent Hall, Elmore Magazine, issue 59, November/December 2013
- Princeton University Library Chronicle, "Photography and the Princeton Collections of Western Americana," by Gabriel A. Swift, vol. LXXV, no. 2, Winter 2014, pp. 242–43
- 20th Century Photographers, Grace Schaub, Routledge, 2015, pp. 99–106. ISBN 978-1-138-84095-9
- Visualizing Albuquerque: Art of Central New Mexico, Joseph Traugott, Albuquerque Museum, 2015. ISBN 978-0-9779910-8-2
- 100 Years of Tattoos, David McComb, London: Laurence King Publishing, 2016. ISBN 978-1-78067-476-6
- 75 Years of Capitol Records, edited by Reuel Golden, Taschen, 2017, pp. 299, 483. ISBN 978-3-83655-028-4
- "The Ascetic," by Dan Chiasson, The New Yorker, September 18, 2017, photograph of W. S. Merwin by Douglas Kent Hall, p. 67
