= Radebaugh =

Radebaugh is a surname. Notable people with the surname include:

- Alan Paine Radebaugh (born 1952), American artist
- Arthur Radebaugh (1906–1974), American illustrator
- Barclay Radebaugh (born 1965), American basketball coach
- Jani Radebaugh, American planetary scientist
- Roy Radebaugh (1881–1945), American baseball player

A place in the United States:

- A community in Hempfield Township, Westmoreland County, Pennsylvania.
