= Paul Engle =

American poet

- Born: October 12, 1908; Cedar Rapids, Iowa, U.S.
- Died: March 22, 1991 (aged 82); Chicago, Illinois, U.S.
- Occupations: Writer and teacher

Paul Hamilton Engle (October 12, 1908 – March 22, 1991), was an American poet, editor, teacher, literary critic, novelist, and playwright. He is remembered as the long-time director of the Iowa Writers' Workshop and as co-founder of the International Writing Program (IWP), both at the University of Iowa.

== Life ==
Engle was born in Cedar Rapids, Iowa to Hamilton Allen, a livery stable owner, and Evelyn (Reinheiner) Engle. He grew up in the Wellington Heights section of Cedar Rapids. He graduated from Washington High School (Cedar Rapids, Iowa), and later attended Coe College (class of 1931), The University of Iowa, Columbia University, and Merton College, Oxford (where he studied as a Rhodes Scholar 1933–1936). As a student at Iowa, Engle was one of the earliest recipients of an advanced degree awarded for creative work: his first collection Worn Earth, which went on to win the Yale Series of Younger Poets. His second book, American Song (1934), was given a rave front-page review in the New York Times Book Review and was even, briefly, a bestseller. From 1954 to 1959, Engle served as series editor for the O. Henry Prize.

== Iowa Writers' Workshop ==
During his tenure as director of the Iowa Writers' Workshop (1941–1965), he was responsible for bringing some of the finest writers of the day to Iowa City. Robert Lowell, John Berryman, Robie Macauley, Kurt Vonnegut and many other prominent novelists and poets served as faculty under Engle. He increased enrollment and oversaw numerous students of future fame and influence, including Flannery O'Connor, Philip Levine, Mark Costello, Marvin Bell, Joe Nicholson, Sunil Gangopadhyay, Donald Justice, Raymond Carver, Douglas Kent Hall, Andre Dubus, and Robert Bly. During his tenure, Engle raised millions of dollars in support of the program whose shape and direction proved the model for hundreds of writing programs that have followed.

Vonnegut described Engle in a 1967 letter in this fashion: "The former head, Paul Engle, is still around, is a hayseed clown, a foxy grandpa, a terrific promoter, who, if you listen closely, talks like a man with a paper asshole."

In 1967, following his departure as director of the workshop, Engle and future second wife Nieh Hualing co-founded The University of Iowa's International Writing Program, which provided for dozens of published authors from around the world to visit Iowa City each year to write and collaborate. Engle left the Writer's Workshop permanently in 1969 to devote himself full-time to the international program. One of these various programmes' enduring legacies was that they helped mainstream humanist ideals of literature and writing: The most famous principles advocated (though not created by the workshops) were writing from self-knowledge (write what you know) and with self-discipline (show, don’t tell), with Engle summarizing his philosophy as "sensations, not doctrines; experiences, not dogmas; memories, not philosophies.".

== Death and legacy ==
At the time of his death (in Chicago's O'Hare Airport on his way to accept an award in Poland), Engle was the author of more than a dozen collections of poetry, a novel, a memoir, an opera libretto (for Philip Bezanson), and even a children's book. Engle wrote numerous articles and reviews for many of the largest periodicals of his day.

His papers are held at the libraries of the University of Iowa and Coe College.

== Works ==
=== Poetry ===
- Worn Earth, Yale University Press, 1932.
- American Song, Doubleday, 1934, reprinted, AMS Press, 1979.
- Break the Heart's Anger, Doubleday, 1936.
- Corn, Doubleday, 1939.
- New Englanders, Prairie Press (Muscatine, IA), 1940.
- West of Midnight, Random House, 1941.
- American Child: A Sonnet Sequence, Random House, 1945
  - revised and enlarged edition published as American Child: Sonnets for My Daughter, Dial, 1956.
- The Word of Love, Random House, 1951.
- Book and Child: Three Sonnets, Cummington Press (Iowa City, IA), 1956.
- Poems in Praise, Random House, 1959.
- Christmas Poems, privately printed, 1962.
- A Woman Unashamed and Other Poems, Random House, 1965.
- Embrace: Selected Love Poems', Random House, 1969.
- Images of China: Poems Written in China, April–June, 1980, preface by Hualing Nieh, New World Press (Beijing), 1981.

=== Other ===
- Always the Land (novel), Random House, 1941.
- A Prairie Christmas (nonfiction), Longmans, Green, 1960.
- Golden Child (novel), Dutton, 1962.
- Who's Afraid?, Crowell-Collier, 1962.
- An Old-Fashioned Christmas, Dial, 1964.
- Women in the American Revolution, Follett, 1976.
- A Lucky American Childhood. foreword Albert E. Stone. Iowa City, IA: University of Iowa Press. 1996. ISBN 978-1-58729-636-9.

=== Editor ===
- 1954–59 Prize Stories: The O. Henry Awards, six volumes, Doubleday.
- (With Warren Carrier) Reading Modern Poetry, Scott Foresman, 1955, revised edition, 1968.
- Homage to Baudelaire, on the Centennial of "Les Fleurs du Mal," Cummington Press, 1957.
- (With Henri Coulette) Midland: Twenty-Five Years of Fiction and Poetry from the Writing Workshops of the State University of Iowa, Random House, 1961.
- (With Joseph Langland) Poet's Choice, Dial Press, 1962.
- On Creative Writing, Dutton, 1964.
- Midland II, Random House, 1970.
- (And translator with wife, Hualing Nieh) Poems of Mao Tse-Tung, Dell, 1972.
- (With Rowena Torrevillas and Hualing Nieh Engle) The World Comes to Iowa: Iowa International Anthology, Iowa State University (Ames, IA), 1987.

NB: for further reference, Richard B. Weber (Library of the University of Iowa, 1966) has compiled a comprehensive bibliography entitled Paul Engle: A Checklist of books Paul Engle authored, as well as of publications he edited or to which he contributed.
