= William A. Johnstone =

American politician

Member of the California State Assembly from the 68th district
- In office January 6, 1913 - January 4, 1915
- Preceded by: Prescott F. Cogswell
- Succeeded by: Lewis L. Lostutter
- In office January 5, 1903 - January 7, 1907
- Preceded by: Charles Warren Merritt
- Succeeded by: Prescott F. Cogswell

Personal details
- Born: December 15, 1869 Belleville, Ontario, Canada
- Died: September 15, 1937 (aged 67) Winnipeg, Manitoba, Canada
- Party: Republican
- Spouse: Alice Eugenia Bost (m. 1902)
- Children: 3

William Arthur Johnstone (December 15, 1869 – September 15, 1937) served in the California legislature in 1902, 1904, 1912 and 1914. He served as Speaker pro Tem of the California Assembly during the 1914 term, and was listed as a Republican. William A. Johnstone ran for re-election to the California Assembly in District 68 (Los Angeles) as a Progressive in 1915, and lost (3,652 to 5240 votes) to L. L. Lostutter (Republican). Three other candidates received smaller numbers of votes. The California Outlook confirms his nomination as a Progressive for that district. He authored the State Water Commission Act which was signed into law on 19 December 1914. He was appointed to the California State Water Commission 17 March 1915 and later headed the Los Angeles County Civil Service Commission.

William Johnstone was known by the name Will. He was born 15 December 1869 in Ameliasburg, Ontario, Canada. He came to California with his father James Arthur Johnstone in 1890. They established a citrus farm in San Dimas, Los Angeles County. Will applied for naturalization 24 September 1894 and became a citizen of the United States two years later. He married Alice Eugenia Bost 20 December 1902 in Pomona California. They had three daughters, Margaret, Dorothy and Elizabeth (called Jean). Will died 15 September 1937 in Winnipeg, Manitoba, Canada while travelling with his wife.
