= Alexander P. Fleming =

American politician (1849–1920)

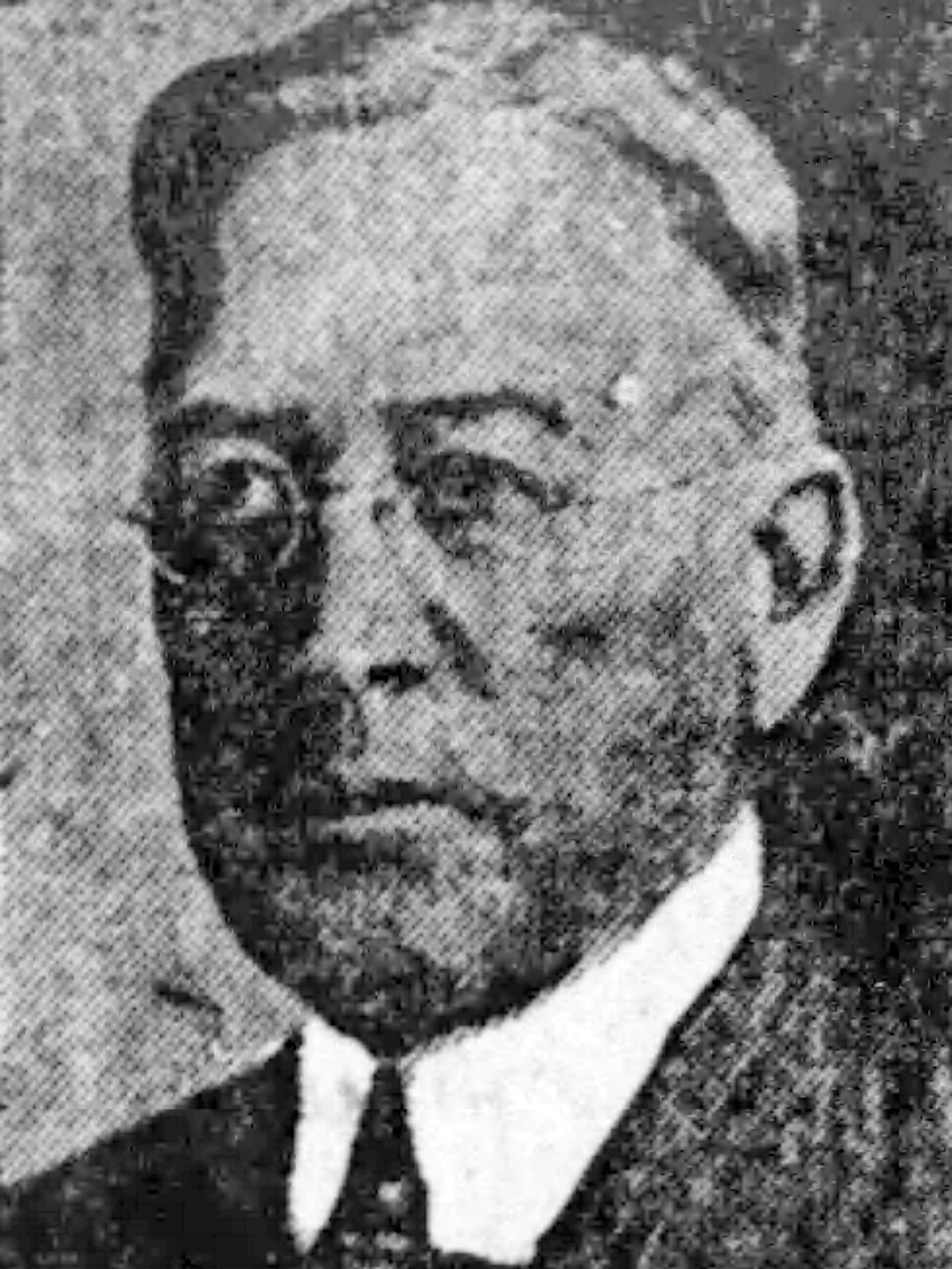
- Fleming in 1920

Member of the Los Angeles City Council for the at-large district
- In office July 7, 1919 – December 15, 1920
- Preceded by: Frank Harwood True
- Succeeded by: Edward J. Delorey

Member of the California State Assembly from the 72nd district
- In office January 6, 1919 – December 15, 1920
- Preceded by: George C. Watson
- Succeeded by: Willard E. Badham

Personal details
- Born: October 27, 1849 Tipton, Iowa
- Died: December 15, 1920 (aged 71) Los Angeles, California
- Party: Republican
- Spouse: Ida V. Fleming

Alexander Patterson Fleming (October 27, 1849 – December 15, 1920) was an American politician who served concurrently in the California State Assembly and on the Los Angeles City Council. He was the author of AB 626, which abolished the State Normal School at Los Angeles and created the Southern Branch of the University of California, which later became the University of California, Los Angeles.

== Early life and education ==
Fleming was born on October 27, 1849, in Tipton, Iowa to a widowed mother, being the seventh child out of thirteen children. As a child, it was stated that his "only ambition was to provide for his dear mother," in which he would become a lawyer to help. It was also stated that Fleming had "a vivid memory of seeing and hearing Lincoln and of having carried the banners for his election."

== Political career ==
On November 29, 1910, Fleming was appointed to the Board Of City Planning Commissioners, serving until December 13, 1911. In 1918, he was a candidate for California State Assembly for the 72nd district, being endorsed by both the Republican and Democratic parties in the election. The next year, he announced his candidacy for the Los Angeles City Council without resigning from his seat in the State Assembly. In the primary, he and seventeen other candidates advanced to the general election. In May, Henry F. Woodward, considered a prime candidate for the City Council and for the motion picture industry, withdrew from the race and endorsed Fleming. In the general election, he won a seat as one of the nine members of the City Council.

== Personal life ==
Fleming married Ida V. Fleming. In November 1920, Fleming became ill at his home in Arlington Heights. Although his condition was reported to be improving, he died of heart failure on December 15, 1920. His death caused a vacancy in both the California State Assembly and in the Los Angeles City Council, and he was succeeded in the City Council by Edward J. Delorey, a former Supervisor and in the State Assembly by Willard E. Badham. Ida later died of heart failure as well a year later, with her death being attributed to her grieving of her husband.
