= Prescott F. Cogswell =

American politician

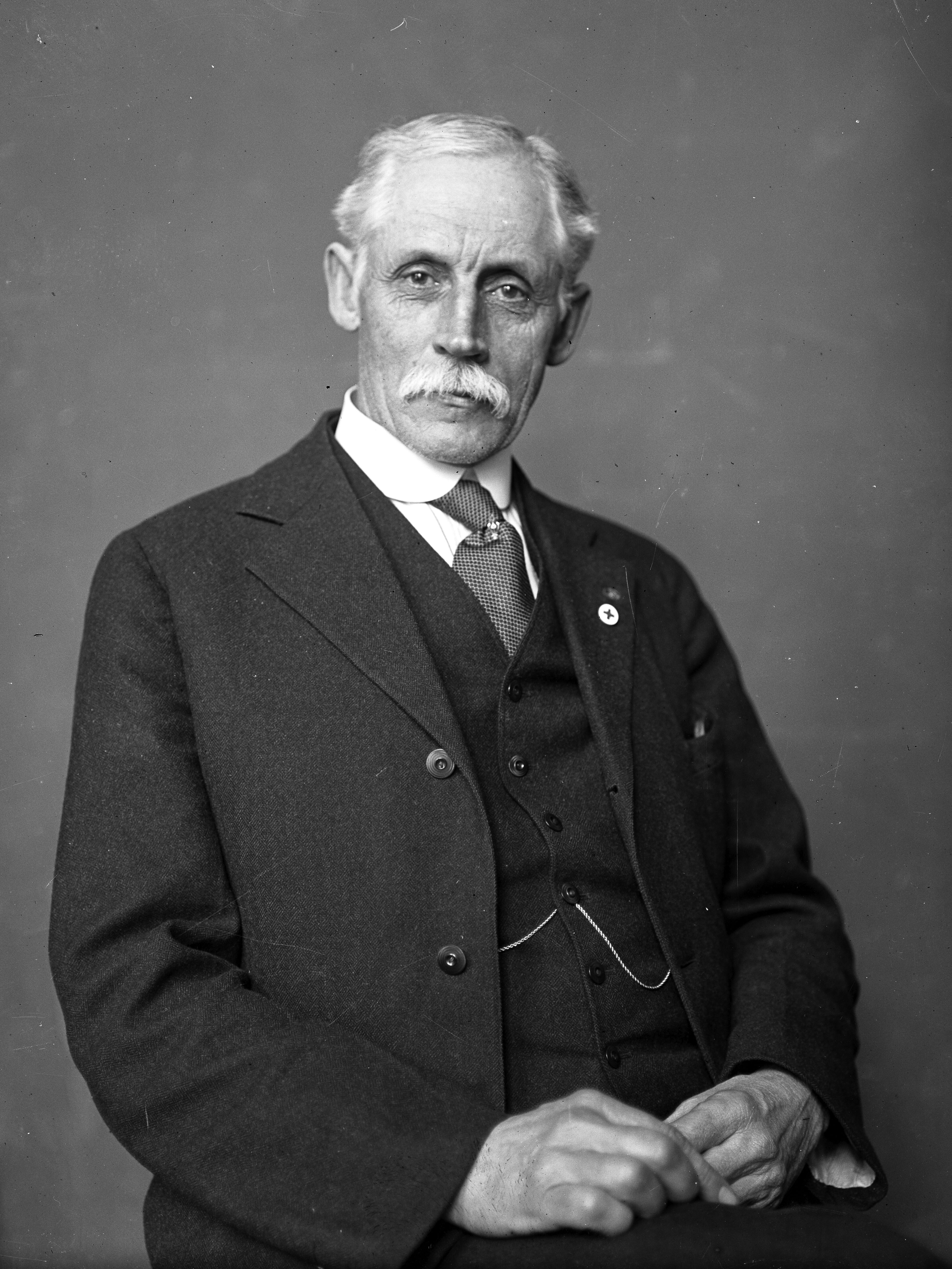
- Cogswell, c. 1921

Member of the Los Angeles County Board of Supervisors
- In office 1918–1926
- Preceded by: John. J. Hamilton
- Succeeded by: Fred T. Beaty
- Constituency: First District

Member of the California Senate from the 33rd district
- In office January 6, 1913 - January 8, 1917
- Preceded by: Louis H. Roseberry
- Succeeded by: Joseph A. Rominger

Member of the California State Assembly from the 68th district
- In office January 7, 1907 - January 6, 1913
- Preceded by: William A. Johnstone
- Succeeded by: William A. Johnstone

Personal details
- Born: October 23, 1859 Thamesford, Ontario, Canada
- Died: January 15, 1960 (aged 100) El Monte, California
- Party: Progressive
- Spouse(s): Jane Belcher(m. 1885, d. 1898); Isabel Adams (m. 1925)
- Children: Frederick, Harold, Irene, Prescott and Horatio
- Education: Albert University

Prescott Franklin Cogswell (October 23, 1859 – January 15, 1960) served in the California legislature for the 33rd District for the 40th and 41st sessions.

== Biography ==
Cogswell was born in Thamesford, Canada West on October 23, 1859.

He was a member of the California State Assembly from 1906 to 1912, and of the California State Senate from 1912 to 1916.

From 1918 to 1926, Cogswell served on the Los Angeles County Board of Supervisors.

He died in El Monte, California on January 15, 1960.

A reservoir on the San Gabriel River was named in his honor.

Political offices
Preceded by John. J. Hamilton	Los Angeles County Supervisor; First District; 1918-1926	Succeeded by Fred T. Beaty
