= Sidney T. Graves =

American politician

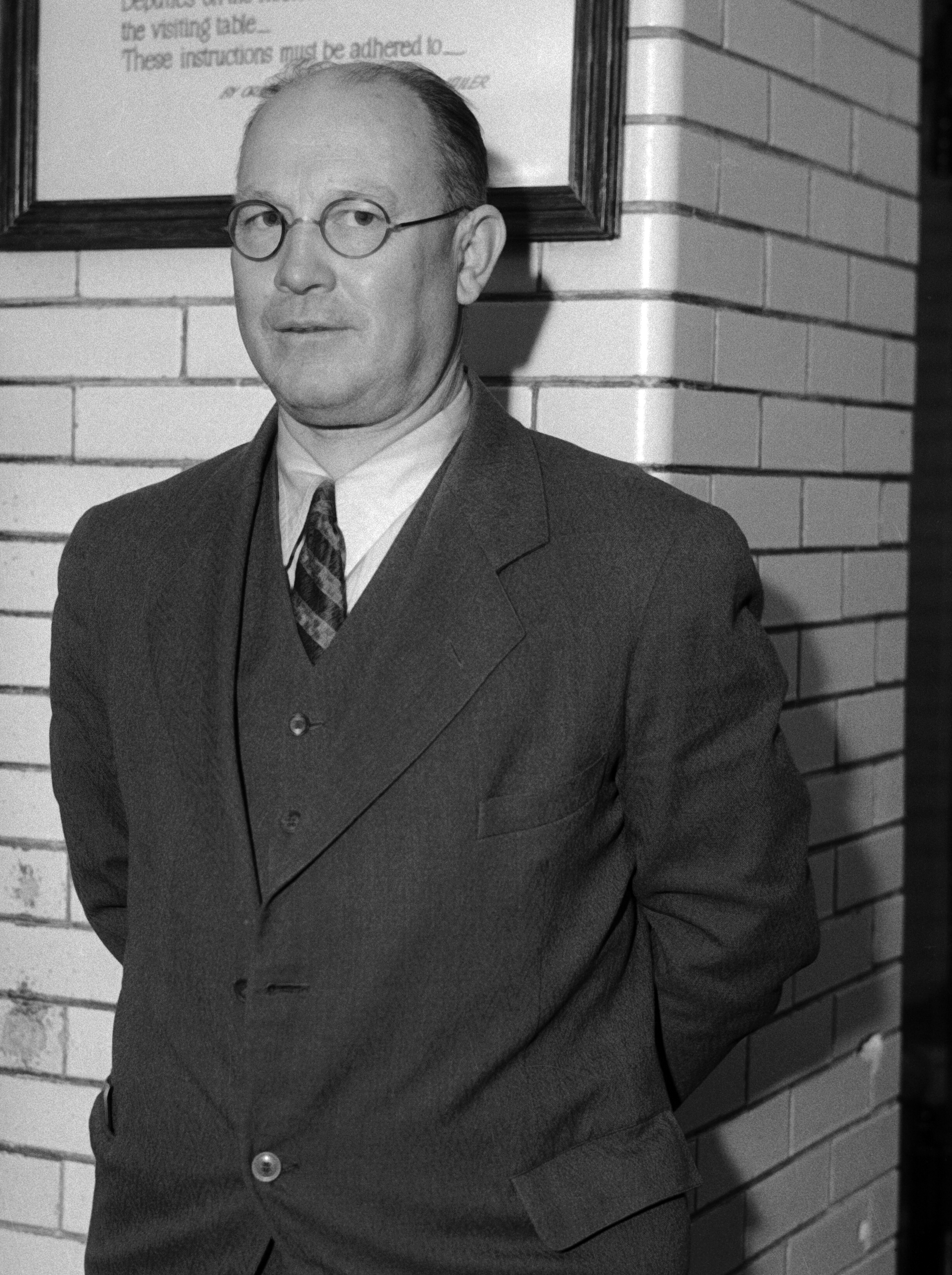
Graves in 1934, awaiting transfer to San Quentin State Prison

Sidney T. Graves was a member of the Los Angeles County Board of Supervisors between 1926 and 1930. He was the only member of the county's governing body to be convicted of a crime and sent to prison. In 1933, the former supervisor was convicted of accepting a bribe concerning the building of a dam on the San Gabriel River. He served three years in state prison and was released, but he had to serve more time in federal prison for evading taxes on the bribe.
