= Samuel S. Thompson =

American politician

Samuel S. Thompson was an early California politician and pioneer to Los Angeles. He served on the third Los Angeles County Board of Supervisors in 1854.

The third County Supervisors in 1854 for Los Angeles were David W. Alexander, Stephen C. Foster, Juan Sepulveda, Cristobal Aguilar, and Samuel S. Thompson.
