= Alan Paine Radebaugh =

- Born: Boston, Massachusetts
- Website: https://www.radebaughfineart.com/

Alan Paine Radebaugh (born 1952) is a contemporary American artist, born in Boston and raised in Maine and New York. He grew up painting, primarily in oils. At the College of Wooster, where he enrolled to study premed, he spent his time taking photographs and designing jewelry. He left Wooster to become a jeweler. Alan Paine Radebaugh left New England in 1973. He lived and worked throughout the western United States for five years. He restored a Victorian house in Colorado; designed and constructed interiors of two Oregon pubs; built an architectural model for the Natural History Museum in Albuquerque, New Mexico; and sculpted clay miniatures for Archeological Museum of Andros, Greece. He had studios in Santa Barbara, California; Portland, Oregon; and Pueblo, Colorado before settling in New Mexico in 1979. He spent ten years designing sculptural art furniture, received a BFA in printmaking from the University of New Mexico, and returned to painting full time in 1988.

Radebaugh's work has been shown across the United States and abroad. In 2002, he had a major exhibition spanning 20 years of creativity, Chasing Fragments: 1982 – 2002 at 516 Magnifico Artspace, Albuquerque, NM. The exhibition included sculptural art furniture, prints, photographs, drawings, and paintings. It centered on Radebaugh's then-recurring theme of fragments.

He spent two and a half years painting 36 canvasses for Mass: of Our World, exhibited at the University of New Mexico Art Museum Jonson Gallery in 2007. The Jonson Paintings hung side-by-side through three galleries, covering 13 walls. Radebaugh received Albuquerque Arts Alliance Award for Excellence in Visual Arts for Mass: Of Our World.

In 2008, Radebaugh began his artistic project, Ghost of Sea. He had been driving and camping throughout the United States and Canada for many years, finding inspiration and subject matter. With this Project, however, he focused his journeys on the Interior Plains of Canada and the Great Plains of the United States. He traveled from the Rockies to the Ohio River Valley and from the Gulf of Mexico to northern Canada. One of the more memorable journeys was two weeks on the Arctic Ocean, 250 miles above the Arctic Circle in Inuvik, Northwest Territories. In 2020 he completed Ghost of Sea, a 12-year Project. Since 2009, Radebaugh has shown this work in many group exhibitions, including Cleveland State University Galleries at CSU and 9 solo exhibitions, including the Nicolaysen Art Museum in Casper, Wyoming, New Mexico Highlands University Gallery, and Lincoln Center in Fort Collins, Colorado.

For his current project, Canyons, begun in 2021, Radebaugh has been traveling extensively throughout the Canyonlands area. Located in Southwest United States, this area includes parts of New Mexico, Arizona, Utah, and Colorado. He has hiked, sketched, and studied landforms in Grand Canyon National Park, Bryce Canyon, Escalante National Monument, Canyon Lands National Park, the Navajo Nation including Canyon de Chelly, along San Juan and Colorado Rivers, and in many lesser-known parks and monuments. The Canyonlands is a spectacularly scenic sandstone area with gorges, mesas, rivers, and winding canyons as represented by Radebaugh's Canyons paintings. These paintings have been shown at South Broadway Cultural Center in Albuquerque, New Mexico in 2023 and in Center for the Arts in Crested Butte, Colorado in 2025.

His artworks are housed in the collections of corporations and cultural institutions including Albuquerque Museum of Art and History; New Mexico Museum of Fine Arts; Ohio State University–Shisler Center, Wooster, Ohio; Portland Museum of Art, Portland, Maine; Roswell Museum and Art Center, New Mexico; The College of Wooster, Ohio; University of New Mexico Art Museum; Bates College Museum of Art, Lewiston, Maine; Marian Graves Mugar Art Gallery, Colby-Sawyer College, New London, New Hampshire; Nicolaysen Art Museum, Casper, Wyoming; Olin Fine Art Gallery, Washington and Jefferson College, Washington, Pennsylvania; and Indianapolis Museum of Art. He also has paintings in the Public Art Collections of the City of Albuquerque, New Mexico; Bernalillo County, New Mexico; and the State of New Mexico.

== Analysis of Work ==
David L. Bell, writing about Radebaugh's sculptural furniture, noted that it has "acute proportion, impeccable detailing."

In critiquing New Mexico landscape artists, Wesley Pulkka commented, "Dappled by sunlight and rough textured as tree bark, Radebaugh's surfaces celebrate nature like a Gerard Manley Hopkins poem."

In a later analysis of Radebaugh's work, Douglas Kent Hall wrote, "Radebaugh is clearly a landscape painter. Yet, he is a landscape painter of a very different kind.... To a certain degree Radebaugh is doing what Jackson Pollock did as an artist....Radebaugh, too, is an action painter....The action he presents is in slow motion, few drips, if any, but plenty of gesture. The painting is what he creates....If Pollock and others from the abstract expressionist school freed line and form from their traditional roles in painting, Radebaugh has responded to their spontaneity and extended it with his almost self-conscious linear detailing."

Jeanne Shoaf, curator of art at the Lincoln Center Art Gallery, wrote that "Radebaugh's complex patterns of negative and positive space capture the stark shadow and light of the plains. The resulting landscapes shape-shift between abstraction and representation, echoing the glints of sun off the shining sea. Ultimately, he makes visible the ghostlike imprint of the sea across the horizon of these Great Plains."

According to Mary Tsiongas, professor of art, University of New Mexico, "Radebaugh re-members the geological past and encodes it in pigment and strokes in the surfaces of these works. . . . Radebaugh paints to translate the experience [of landscape] beyond light, beyond form, to somehow activate our senses and engage us, too, in the long and intricate history of the places he paints.”

Art historian and artist Maria Rose Wimmer writes “Radebaugh willingly inserts himself into the rhythm of the natural scenery. The sites that serve as formal subjects are not determined by historical significance nor are the paintings a direct documentation of a specific place. Instead Radebaugh allows his work to function as revelations into moments that often go unseen or unnoted by the casual observer."
