= Edward J. Delorey =

American politician (1849–1920)

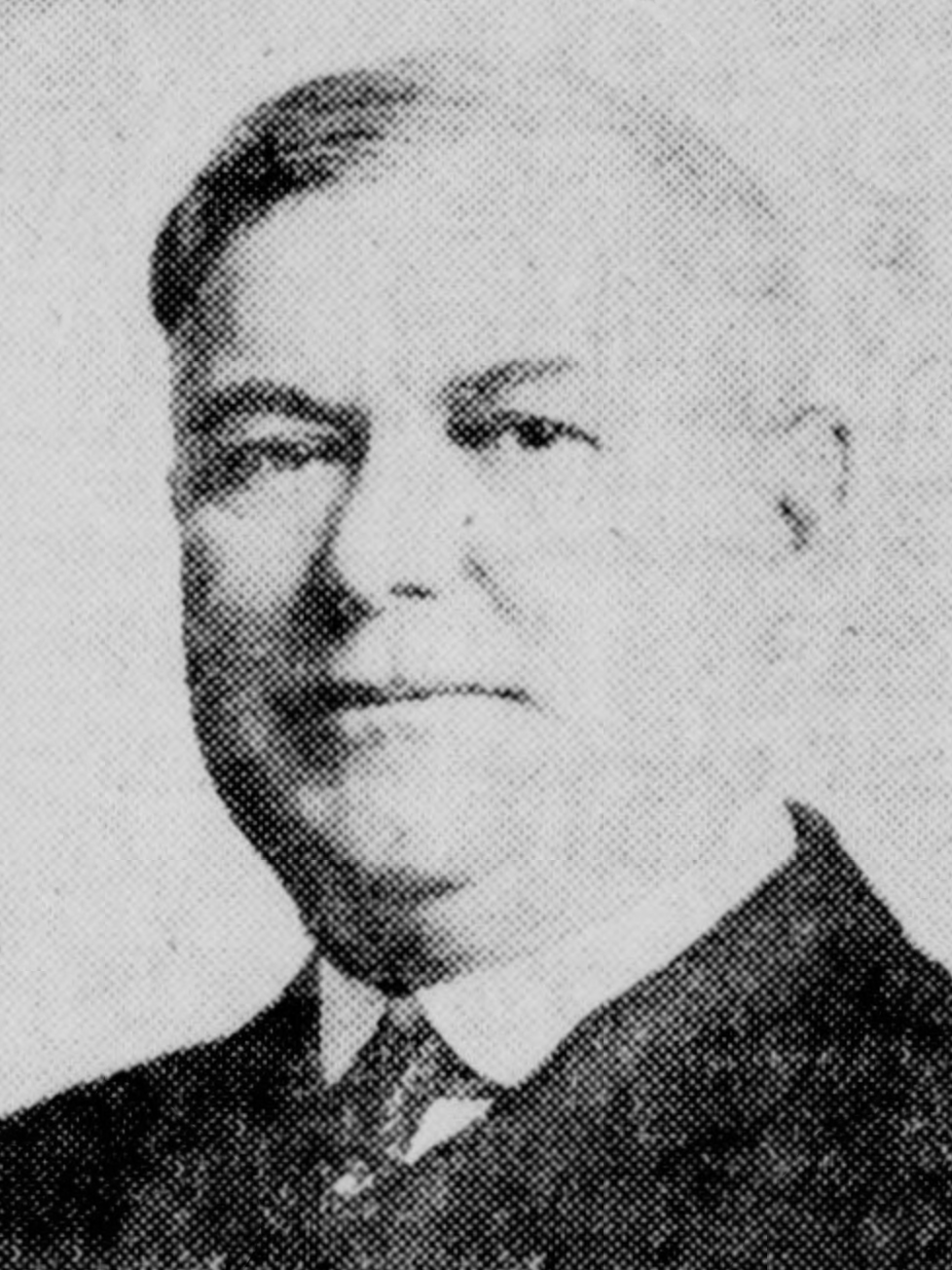
- Delorey in 1917

Member of the Los Angeles City Council for the at-large district
- In office December 24, 1920 – July 5, 1921
- Preceded by: Alexander P. Fleming
- Succeeded by: William C. Mushet

Member of the Los Angeles County Board of Supervisors for the 2nd district
- In office 1917–1918
- Preceded by: Richard H. Norton
- Succeeded by: Jack H. Bean

Personal details
- Born: 1865 Maine, U.S.
- Died: June 8, 1931 (aged 65–66) Los Angeles, California
- Party: Republican
- Spouse: Annie Laurie Bourne (m. 1891)
- Children: 2

Edward James Delorey (1865 – June 8, 1931) was an American politician who served brief tenures on the Los Angeles County Board of Supervisors and the Los Angeles City Council, being appointed to both offices and later losing the offices in elections. He was also a member of the Board of Public Works from 1925 until 1931, and under his Vice Presidency from 1925 to 1927, he helped with the planning and construction of the San Pedro Municipal Building.

== Early life and career ==
Delorey was born in 1865 in Maine to Simon DesLauriers and Bridget DesLauriers, being one of nine children. He came to California in 1885 before settling in Los Angeles in 1896.

== Political career ==
In 1910, Delorey was appointed to the California State Board of Agriculture. In 1916, Delorey ran for Los Angeles County Board of Supervisors for the 3rd district, but lost the election. On October 11, 1917, the seat for the 2nd district of the Board of Supervisors was declared vacant, and in the following month, Delorey was appointed to fill the seat left by Richard H. Norton. The next year, he ran for re-election but was defeated by Jack H. Bean.

On December 24, 1920, Delorey was unanimously appointed to the Los Angeles City Council to fill the seat of Alexander P. Fleming, who had died days prior. He ran for re-election in 1921 but lost the general election after placing behind Fred C. Wheeler and being the 10th vote-getter. On November 2, 1921, Delorey was appointed to the Board of Public Works by Mayor George E. Cryer, becoming the Board's vice president on July 1, 1925. He was re-appointed for a final time by Mayor John Clinton Porter on July 1, 1929 before being ousted from the board on September 16, 1929. After he was ousted, he fought the ousting by taking it to the Supreme Court of California for his reinstatement.

Delorey died on June 8, 1931 at his home in Hancock Park.
