= Juan Capistrano Sepúlveda =

American politician (1814–1898)

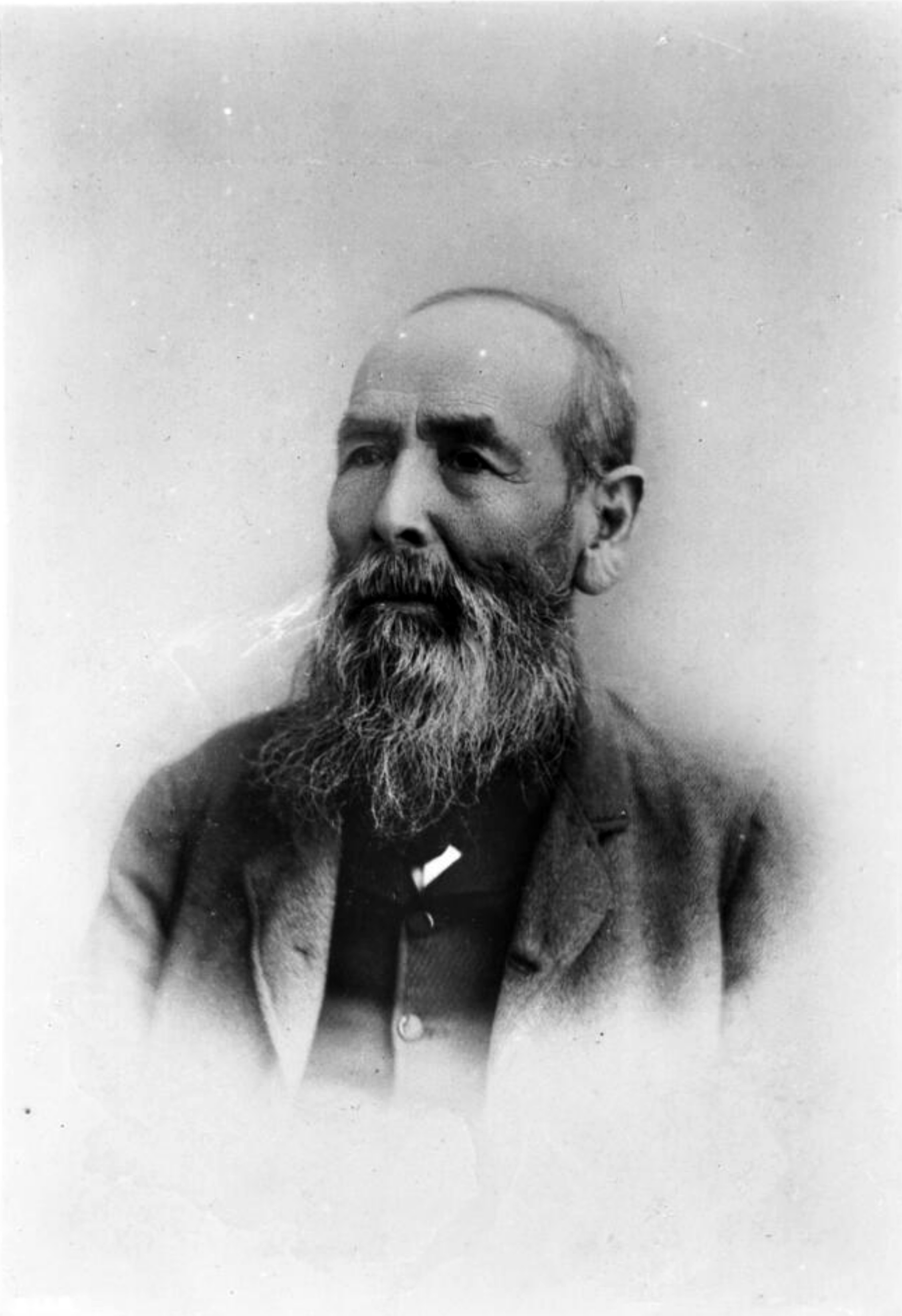
Juan Capistrano Sepúlveda

Juan Capistrano Sepúlveda (1814–1898) was a Californio politician and pioneer in Los Angeles. He was a member of the prominent Sepúlveda family of California.

Juan Capistrano Sepúlveda was a son of José Dolores Sepúlveda (1793 - 1824). He served on the third Los Angeles County Board of Supervisors in 1854 for the 3rd District. The County Supervisors in 1854 were David W. Alexander, Stephen C. Foster, Juan Sepúlveda, Cristóbal Aguilar, and Samuel S. Thompson.
