= Alfred L. Bush =

American writer (1933–2023)

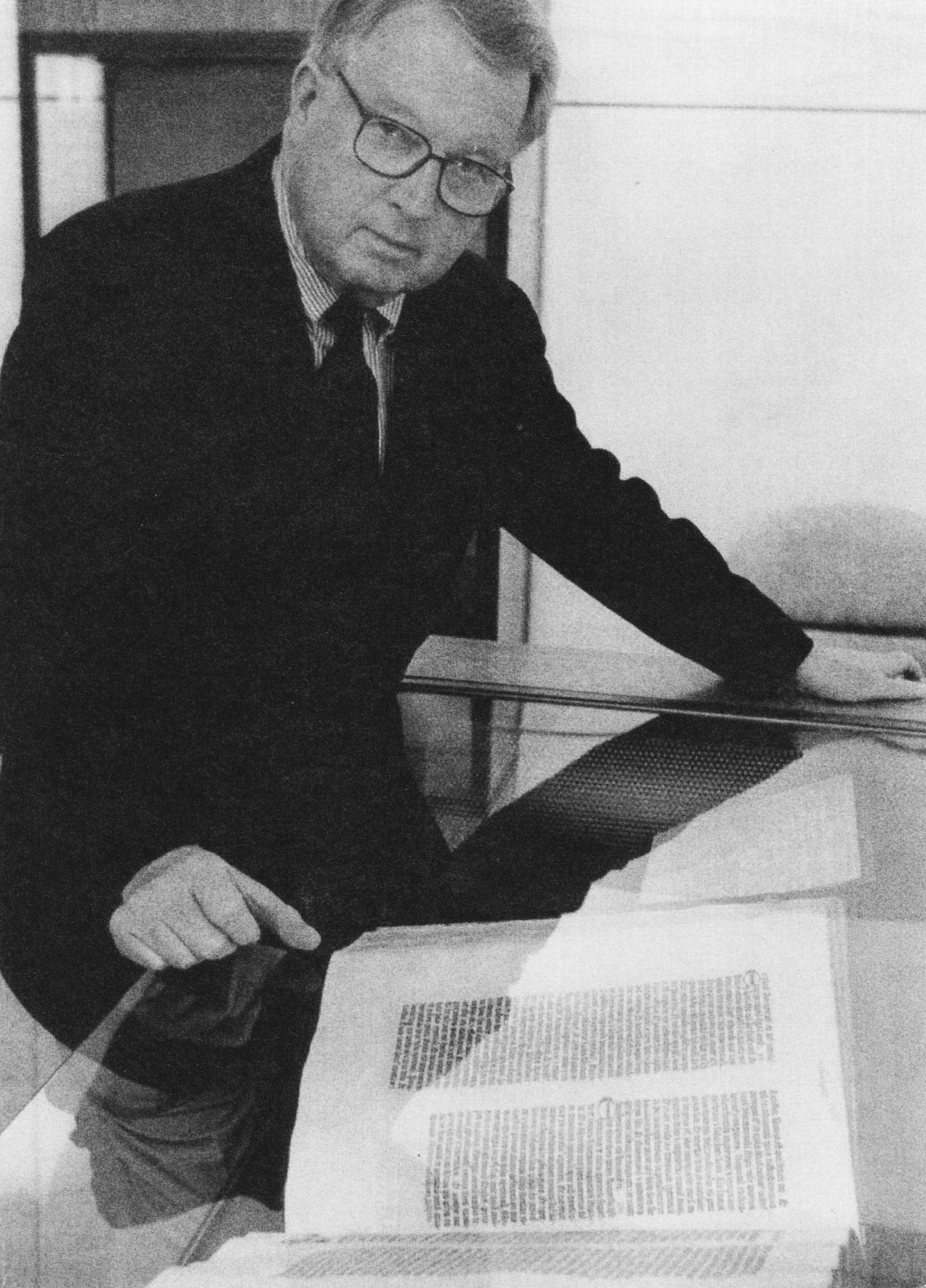
- Born: January 5, 1933; Denver, Colorado, U.S.
- Died: November 9, 2023 (aged 90); Princeton, New Jersey, U.S.
- Education: Brigham Young University
- Occupations: American curator and writer
- Children: Paul Tioux

Alfred Lavern Bush (January 5, 1933 – November 9, 2023) was an American curator, writer and editor. He was Curator of Western Americana at the Princeton University Library. Bush was an editor of the Papers of Thomas Jefferson, where his study of Jefferson images produced The Life Portraits of Thomas Jefferson (1962). He was the author of numerous books and scholarly articles, many of which pertain to Native Americans.

== Early life and education ==
Born in Denver, Colorado, into a fifth-generation Mormon family, Bush graduated from Brigham Young University in 1957, where he continued graduate studies in archaeology before joining the Fifth University Archaeological Society excavations at the Maya site of Aguacatal in western Campeche, Mexico, in the winter of 1958. The following summer he was a student at the Institute for Archival and Historical Management at Radcliffe College.

A mountain climber in his youth, Bush climbed in the Colorado Rockies, the Tetons, and the Swiss Alps. He subsequently served as curator of the American Alpine Club’s museum in New York City.

Bush served in the Medical Service Corps of the US Army in the Panama Canal Zone during the Korean War.

Bush's legally adopted son, Paul Tioux, is an enrolled member of Tesuque Pueblo. Tioux's three daughters have given birth to nine children, Bush's great-grandchildren.

== Career ==
From 1958 through 1962 Bush was an editor of the Papers of Thomas Jefferson. His publication The Life Portraits of Thomas Jefferson (1962) has subsequently gone through several editions, including two published by the National Gallery of Art, in The Eye of Thomas Jefferson and Jefferson and the Arts, both edited by William Howard Adams. Bush discovered the lost 1800 portrait of Jefferson by Rembrandt Peale, which was announced in his 1962 monograph. This image of the president has since eclipsed all others and is the painting most familiar to the public; it now hangs in the White House and is featured on the Jefferson nickel.

Bush proposed and in 1971 created an exhibition at the Grolier Club in New York of ancient Maya hieroglyphic texts, mostly on pottery. The catalog by Michael D. Coe revolutionized the study of texts on Maya ceramics and accelerated the eventual decipherment of the ancient American writing system. The show also brought to light for the first time what purported to be the fourth surviving Maya codex. Highly controversial, this book went through extensive tests over the next half century and only in September 2018 was it declared genuine by the Mexican authorities. Referred to as the Grolier Codex, it is now recognized as the earliest surviving book from ancient America, dating to the 11th century.

During Bush's forty years as Curator of Western Americana at Princeton University Library, he enlarged the size of the collection tenfold and added a collection of photographs of American Indians and an archival component of papers on twentieth-century American Indian Affairs. In the 1970s he aided Princeton's recruitment of American Indian students and acted as their undergraduate advisor. After the 1990 enactment of the Native American Graves Protection and Repatriation Act he also served as Princeton University's Curator for Repatriation. Bush taught courses at Princeton University on Native American subjects in the departments of English, Art, and Archaeology, and in 1981 a course on Mayan Literature in the department of Anthropology. In 1971 he taught Art of the American Indian at Trinity College, Hartford, Connecticut. He was awarded a fellowship to spend a sabbatical year at the Huntington Library, San Marino, California.

Bush served for three decades on the editorial board of the Princeton University Library Chronicle, and was its editor from 1962 to 1977. He is also the founding editor of Princeton History, first issued in 1971.

In retirement Bush advised institutions facing issues of repatriation of American Indian remains and artifacts. He also served on the visiting committee of the Arts of Africa, Oceania, and the Americas of the Metropolitan Museum of Art in New York City.

== Death ==
Bush died in Princeton on November 9, 2023, at the age of 90.

== Awards ==
- The 2020 Princeton University Alumni Awards. Bush received the Alumni Council Award for Service to Princeton for recruiting and mentoring American Indian students. The Award recognizes outstanding service contributions by any member of the Princeton family, with special emphasis on those who serve significantly, but inconspicuously. In its announcement, the Council noted, "With the Award for Service to Princeton, the Alumni Council is honored to recognize a true sachem, chief, who, by enriching the lives of Native Americans at Princeton, has not only enriched the life of the University but also enriched a nation’s understanding."
- The Western History Association presented Bush with an honorary lifetime member award in 2019.

== Curated exhibitions ==
- Princeton University Library: "Ancient America: Five Centuries of Discovery" (1965); "Wilde and the Nineties" (1966); "Literary Landmarks of Princeton" (1967); "Windows on Other Worlds: An Exhibition of Classic Works of Ethnography" (1978); "A Quorem Called Out of the Kingdom: One Hundred and Fifty Imprints from the First Century and a Half of Mormonism" (1980); "A First and Second Tongue: Nine Spanish-Speaking Peoples in America’ (1983); "The Photograph and the American Indian" (1985); "Books for Kings: Illuminated Manuscripts from the Orient" (1985); "A Century for the Millennium" (2000).
- Grolier Club, New York City: "Desert Wanderers and Wayfarers" (1967); "The Maya Scribe and His World" (1971); and a Cragwood Miscellany (1993), highlights from the library of Jane Engelhard.

== Published books and articles ==
- The Life Portraits of Thomas Jefferson. Charlottesville, Virginia: Thomas Jefferson Memorial Foundation, 1962. LC control number 62015594
- Wilde and the Nineties, with Richard Ellman, E. D. H. Johnson, and Charles Ryskamp. Princeton, New Jersey: Princeton University Library, 1966. ISBN 978-0878110100
- Literary Landmarks of Princeton. 1968. ASIN: B00E3ESL0K
- The Princeton Collections of Western Americana. Princeton University Library Chronicle 33, no. 1 (Autumn 1971).
- The Life Portraits of Thomas Jefferson, rev. ed. Charlottesville: University of Virginia Press, 1987. ISBN 978-0813911632
- The Photograph and the American Indian, with Lee Clark Mitchell. Princeton, New Jersey: Princeton University Press, 1994. ISBN 978-0691034898
- "Eastern Universities and Indians," "Princeton University." In Encyclopedia of North American Indians, edited by Frederick E. Hoxie, 173–74. Boston: Houghton Mifflin, 1996. ISBN 978-0395669211
- "Photography of and by Indians." In Encyclopedia of North American Indians, edited by Frederick E. Hoxie, 477–80. Boston: Houghton Mifflin, 1996. ISBN 978-0395669211
- Remembering Alfonso Ortiz. D’Arcy McNickle Center for the History of the American Indian. Newberry Library. 1998. ASIN: B004FNA4A4
- Pueblo Artists Portraits, with Toba Tucker, Rina Swentzell, and Lonnie Vigil. Santa Fe: Museum of New Mexico Press, 1998. ISBN 978-0890133637
- Einstein's Poems to Johanna Fantova: An Introduction. Princeton University Library Chronicle, 65, no. 1 (Autumn 2003), 79–82.
- Charles Ryskamp, 1928–2010, with Bruce Redford, Verlyn Klinkenborg, and John Bidwell. New York: Ink, Inc., 2011.
- A Few Incidents from My Life among the Indians on the Princeton Campus. Princeton University Library Chronicle 78, no. 1 (Autumn–Winter 2020), 105–24.
