= Alfred Louis Bush =

American politician

County Supervisor for the Los Angeles Board of Supervisors
- In office 1872–1874

Member of the Los Angeles Common Council for the 4th Ward
- In office December 9, 1882 – October 27, 1883

Personal details
- Born: February 3, 1849 Vriesland, Michigan
- Died: July 3, 1902 (aged 53)
- Spouse: Clara
- Children: Wilhelmine, Anna Louis, and Alfred Jr.

Alfred Louis Bush (1849–1902) was an industrialist and politician in Los Angeles County, California.

== History ==
Bush was born February 3, 1849, in Vriesland, Michigan, where he attended public schools until age 15. when he became a machinist's apprentice.

In 1870 he moved to South Bend, Indiana, where he formed a partnership, Bush and Palmeteer. The company built gasoline engines and other machines.

In his business life, he later consolidated his machinery business with the Burge Manufacturing Company to form the Bush and Burge Company.

== Los Angeles ==
He moved to Los Angeles, California, and at age 23 he was elected in 1872 to the Los Angeles County Board of Supervisors from the 4th District. Ten years later, on December 4, 1882, he was elected to the Los Angeles Common Council from the 4th Ward for a two-year term, but he resigned on October 27, 1883.

He died on July 3, 1902, survived by his wife, Clara, and three children, Wilhelmine, Anna Louis, and Alfred Jr.
