= 1941 Los Angeles mayoral election =

- April 1, 1941 and May 6, 1941
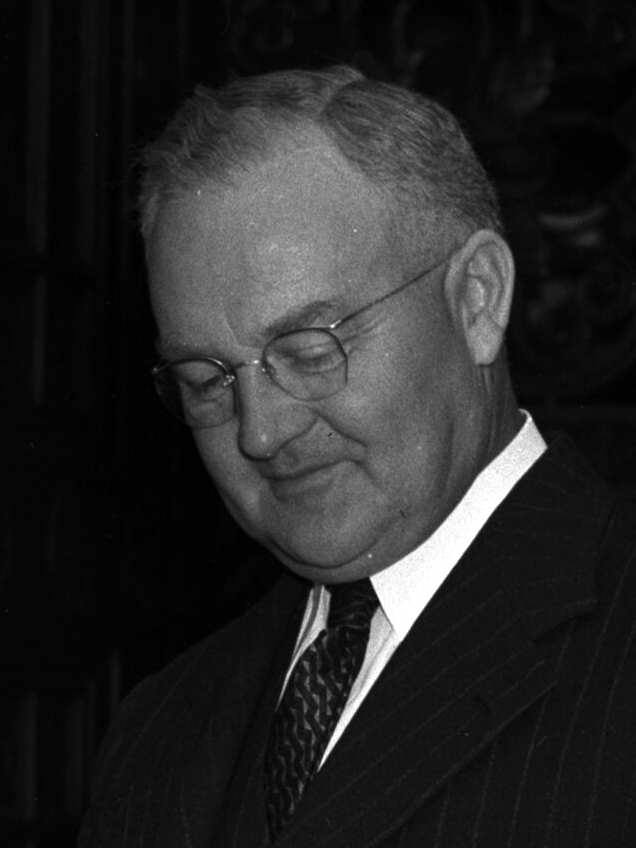

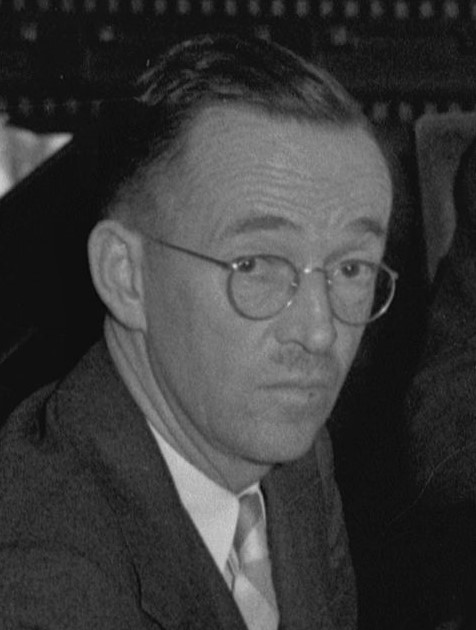

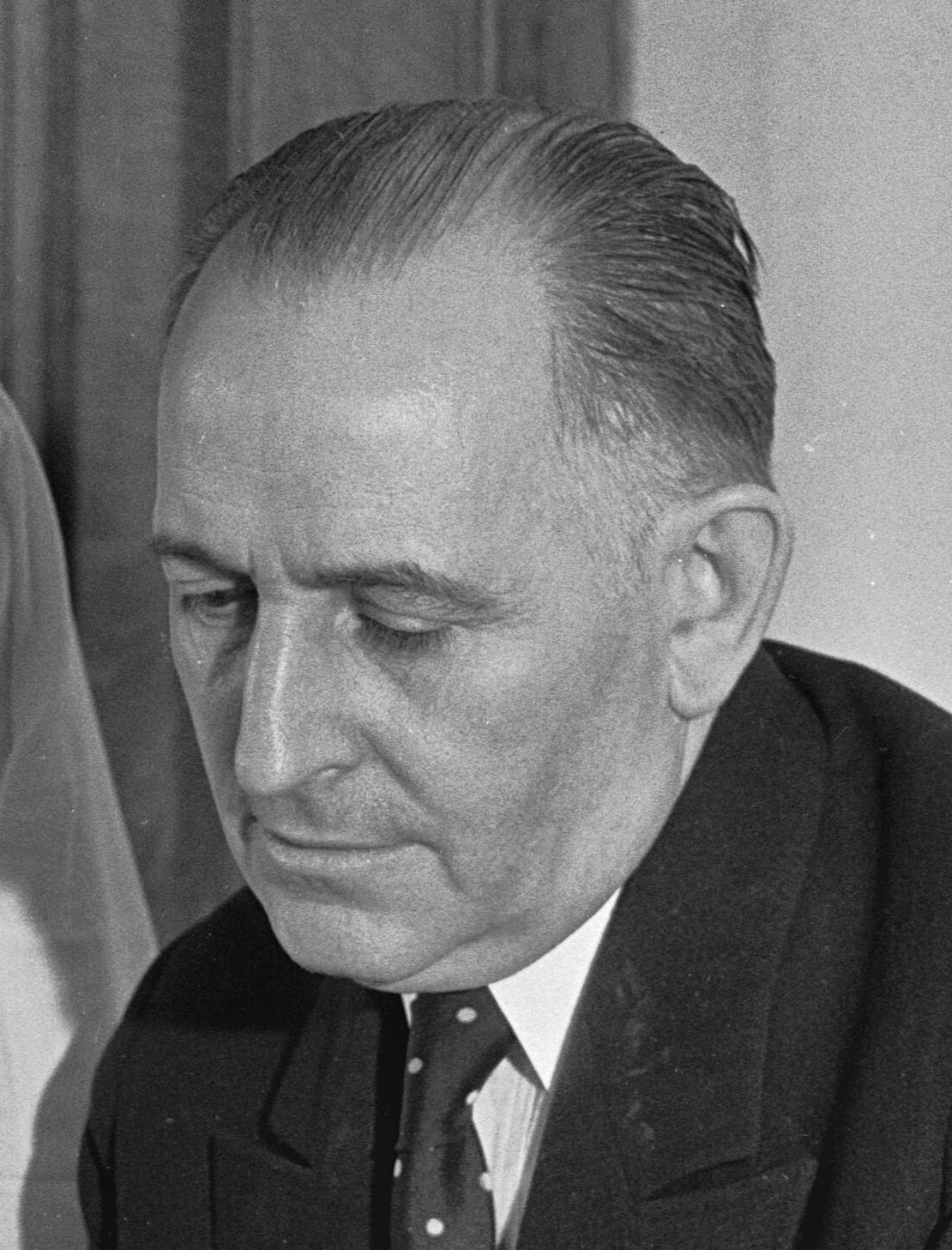

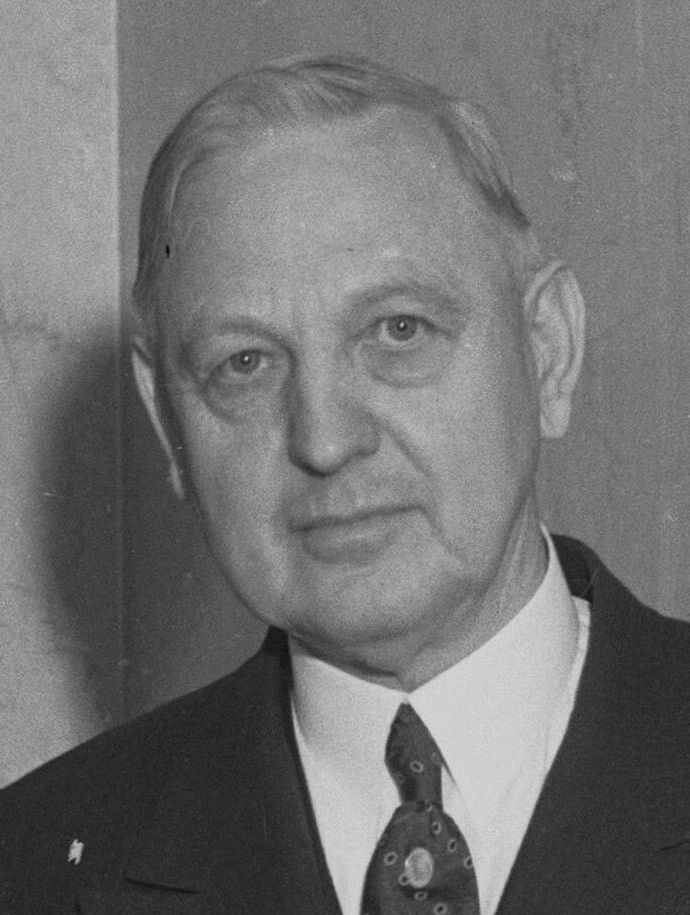

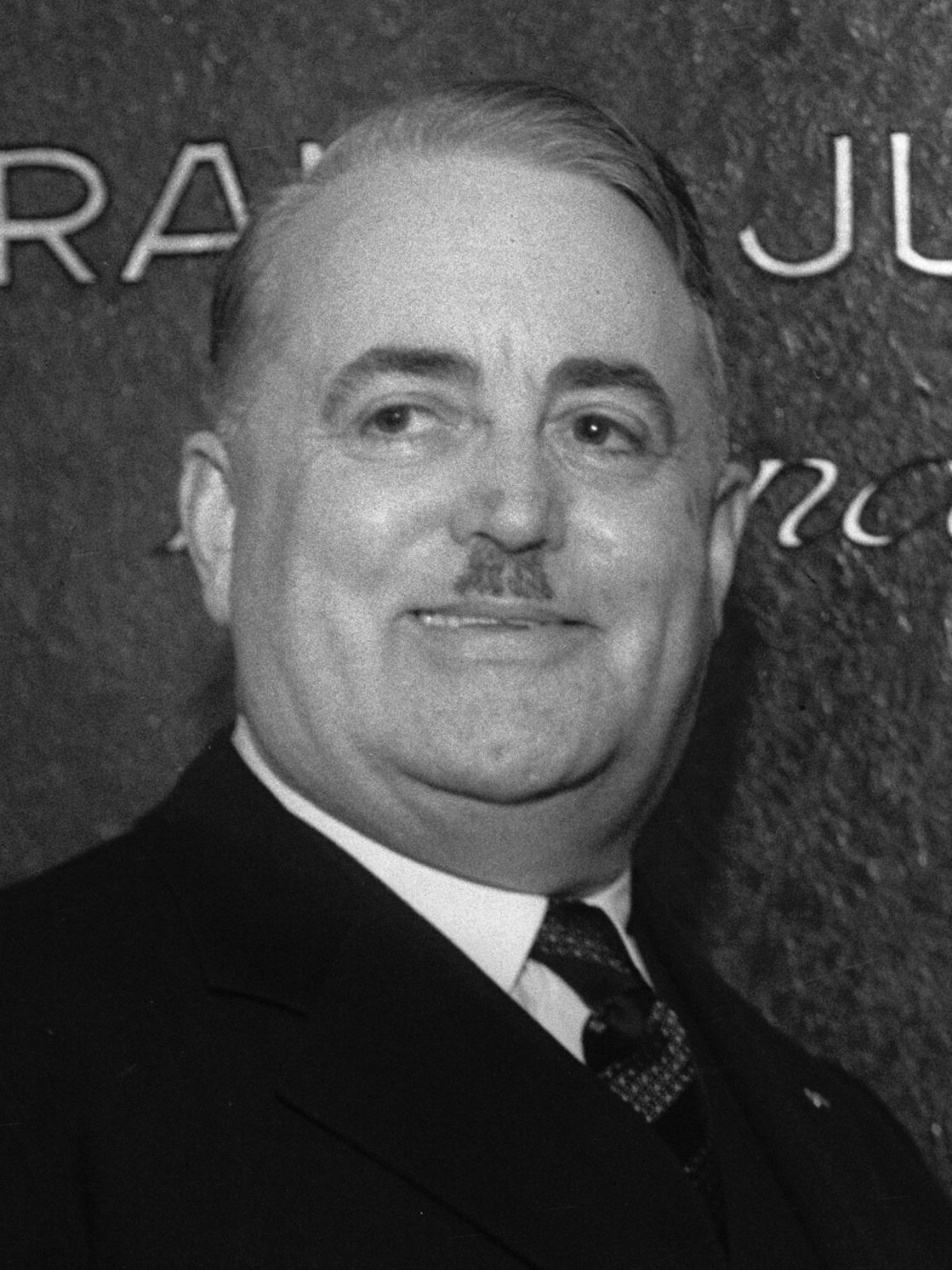
Candidate	Fletcher Bowron	Stephen W. Cunningham	Charles Kramer
First round	146,405; 48.84%	57,109; 19.05%	30,643; 10.22%
Runoff	181,582; 54.90%	149,195; 45.10%	Eliminated
Candidate	John C. Porter	Frank L. Shaw
First round	28,712; 9.58%	24,382; 8.13%
Runoff	Eliminated	Eliminated
Mayor before election
Fletcher Bowron
Elected Mayor
Fletcher Bowron

The 1941 Los Angeles mayoral election took place on April 1, 1941, with a run-off election on May 6, 1941. Incumbent Fletcher Bowron was re-elected in the runoff election, defeating councilmember Stephen W. Cunningham.

Municipal elections in California, including mayor of Los Angeles, are officially nonpartisan; candidates' party affiliations do not appear on the ballot.

== Election ==
After being elected in the 1938 recall, Bowron was now seeking a second term in office, with it being his first full term. He was challenged by city councilmember Stephen W. Cunningham, U.S. Representative Charles Kramer, and former Mayors John C. Porter and Frank L. Shaw. Thomas F. Ford, another U.S. Representative, had previously filed to run before withdrawing. In the primary, Bowron and Cunningham advanced to the general election, with Bowron taking most of the votes.

In the runoff election, attorney Greg Bautzer urged the election of Cunningham against Bowron. Bowron won the runoff with a majority of the vote.

== Results ==
=== Primary election ===
Los Angeles mayoral primary election, April 1, 1941
Candidate	Votes	%
Fletcher Bowron (incumbent)	146,405	48.84
Stephen W. Cunningham	57,109	19.05
Charles Kramer	30,643	10.22
John Clinton Porter	28,712	9.58
Frank L. Shaw	24,382	8.13
Charles J. Husband	9,120	3.04
Angie Rossitto	1,963	0.66
Joseph H. Thayer	1,410	0.47
Total votes	299,744	100.00

=== General election ===
Los Angeles mayoral general election, May 6, 1941
Candidate	Votes	%
Fletcher Bowron (incumbent)	181,582	54.90
Stephen W. Cunningham	149,195	45.10
Total votes	330,777	100.00
