= Ernest L. Webster =

American politician

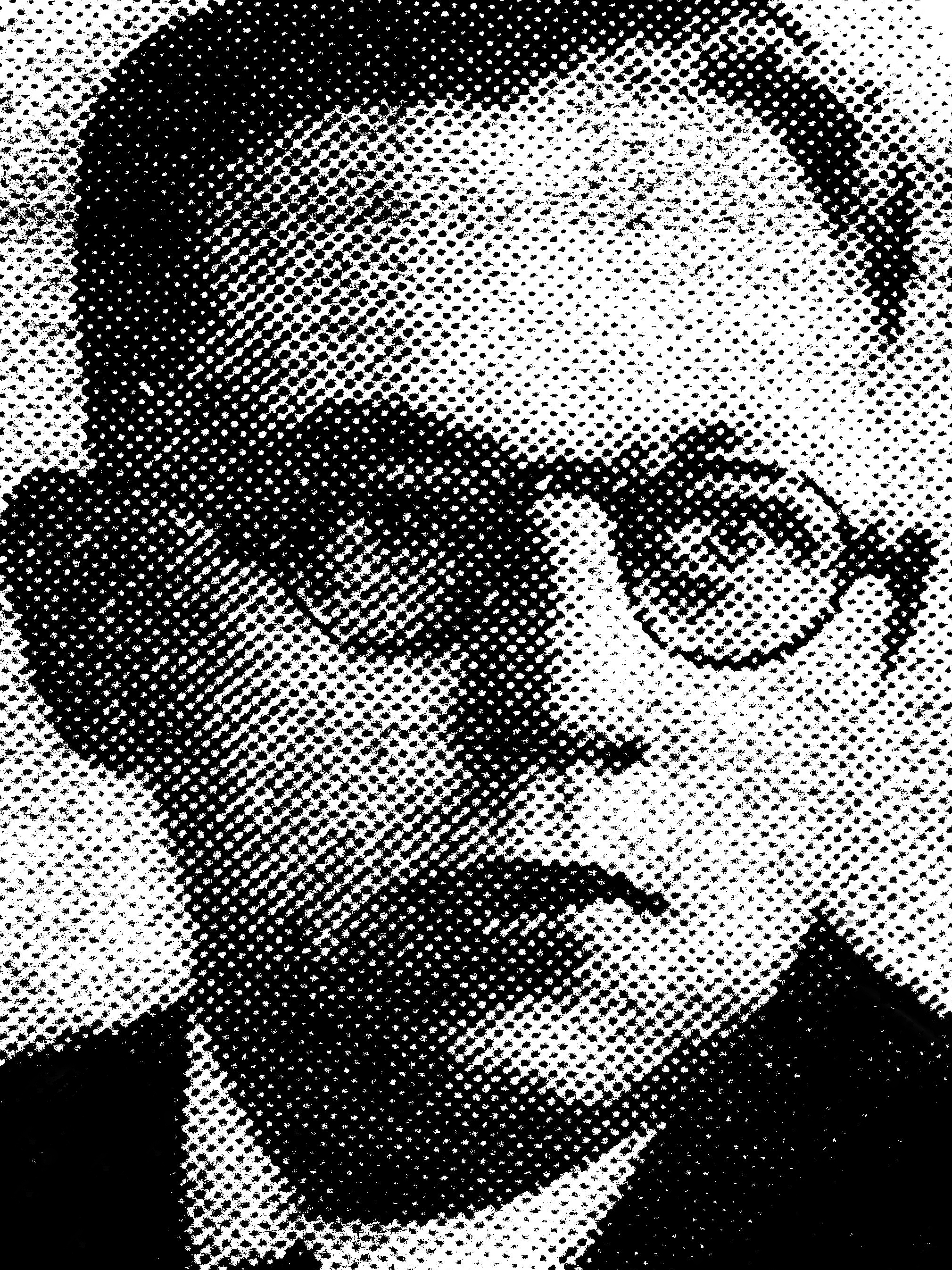
- Webster in the 1930s

Member of the Los Angeles City Council for the 3rd district
- In office July 1, 1927 – June 30, 1931
- Preceded by: Isaac F. Hughes
- Succeeded by: James Stuart McKnight

Personal details
- Born: 1889 Youngstown, Ohio
- Died: April 2, 1984 Los Angeles, California
- Spouse: Nettie Elizabeth Kline (m. 1912)

Ernest L. Webster (1889–1984) was a pioneer automobile dealer in Los Angeles, California, and representative of the 3rd District on the Los Angeles City Council between 1927 and 1931.

== Biography ==
Webster was born in 1889 in Youngstown, Ohio, to Warren Webster, originally from Pennsylvania, and Jane William Webster, from South Wales. As a youth he worked for the Youngstown Sheet and Tubing Company as a pattern maker. In 1914 he became an automobile salesman and moved to California in 1917, where he worked at early automobile agencies both in Los Angeles and San Diego. He formed the Landsdale-Webster Company, dealing in automobile accessories, in 1925, and then the Startomatic Company, which was later leased to the Bendix Corporation.

He was married on December 25, 1912, to Nettie Elizabeth Kline.

In 1934, he said his hobbies were his bungalow home at 5139 Maplewood Avenue, in today's Larchmont District, "with its rock pool, rose garden, barbecue and outdoor clubroom." After his retirement from public service he was in the commercial photography business. He died on January 16, 1954, leaving his widow; a sister, Mrs. Addie Ford, and two brothers, John and Warren.

== Public service ==
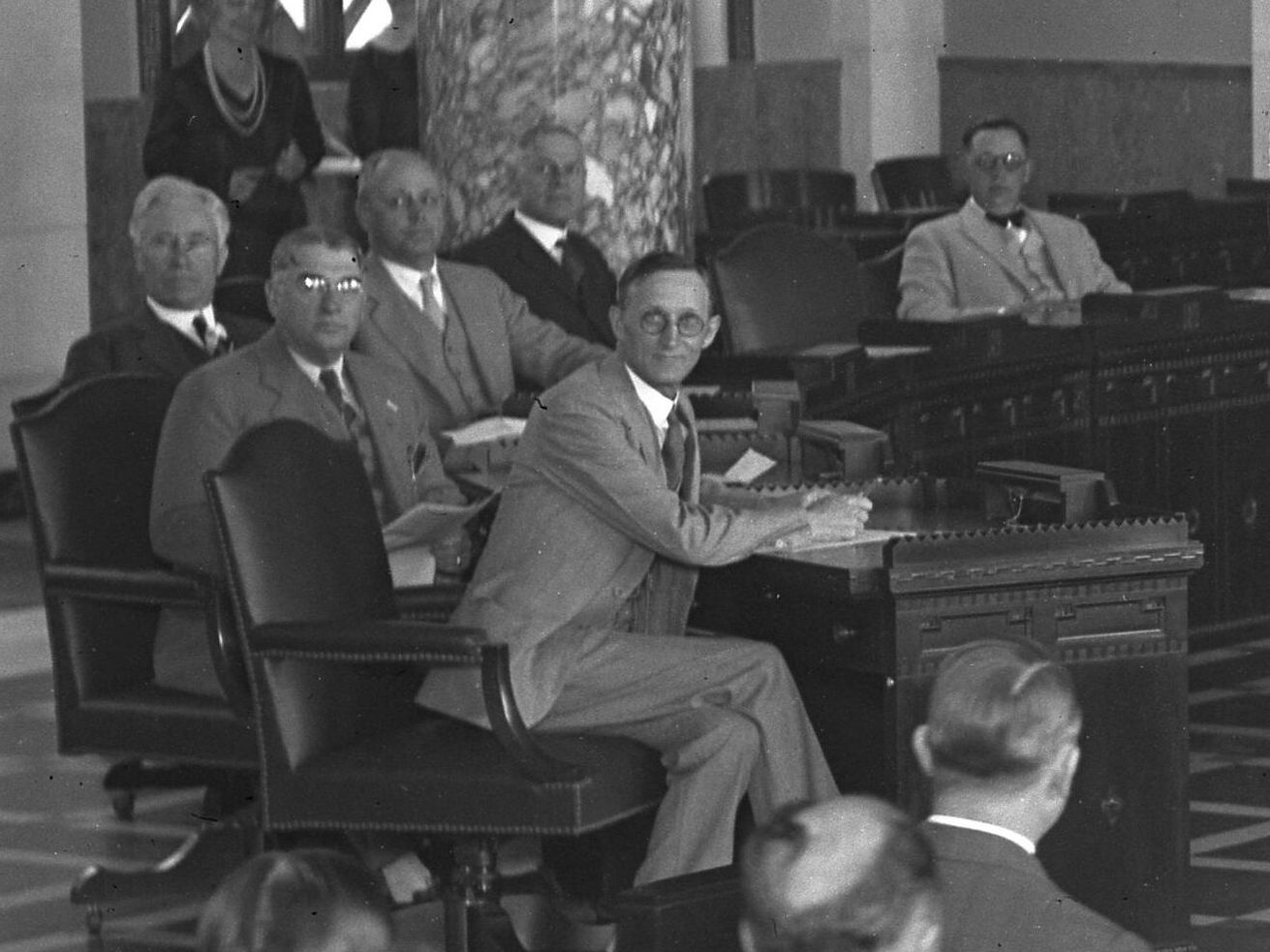
Webster (far right) in the Los Angeles City Council in 1928.

Webster ran in 1927 for the 3rd Councilmanic District post as an anti-Parrot candidate, and trounced the incumbent, Isaac F. Hughes by a vote of 9,608 to 2,386 in the June final. He was easily reelected in May 1929. At that time, the 3rd District was known as the "West Washington area," but it actually lay mostly south of the Santa Monica Mountains east of Sawtelle, with its eastern boundary at Western Avenue, and its southern boundary running along Washington Boulevard to embrace the Palms area. It included the Los Angeles Country Club and the Sawtelle district, and all the Santa Monica Mountains west of Sawtelle to the Ventura County line, including Pacific Palisades and Topanga Canyon.

During his two terms, he was instrumental in installing a traffic-signal system on Wilshire Boulevard and unsuccessfully advocated legislation for public nurses in parochial schools.

In January 1930, Webster and seven other council members who had voted in favor of granting a rock-crushing permit in the Santa Monica Mountains were unsuccessfully targeted for recall on the grounds that the eight

have conspired with . . . Alphonzo Bell, Samuel Traylor and Chapin A. Day, all multi-millionaires, to grant this group a special spot zoning permit to crush and ship . . . from the high-class residential section of Santa Monica, limestone and rock for cement.

Webster was among six council members who in May 1930 unsuccessfully opposed allocating funds to make a study of leveling Bunker Hill, "which stands as a hindrance to traffic and a bar to development in the northwestern downtown territory."

He ran for reelection again in 1931 but was beaten by James Stuart McKnight, 7,866 to 4,861. He was appointed secretary of the city's Building and Safety Commission in 1934.

Preceded by Isaac F. Hughes	Los Angeles City Council; 3rd district 1927–31	Succeeded by James Stuart McKnight
