= J. Win Austin =

American businessman and politician

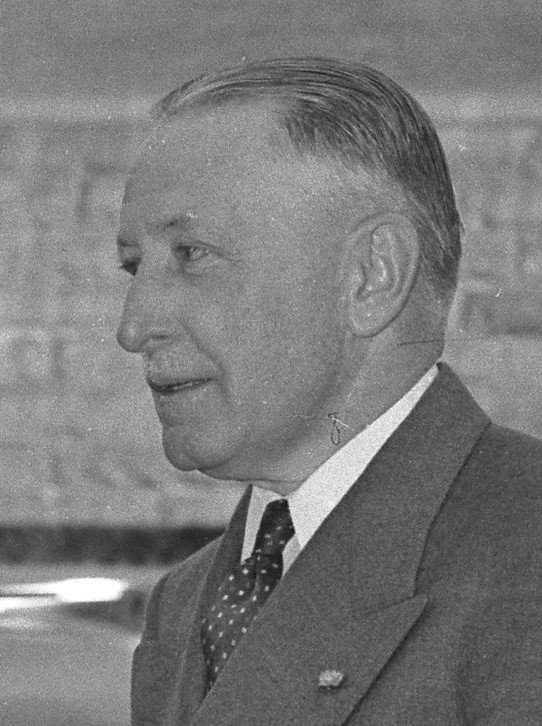
- Austin in 1942

Member of the Los Angeles City Council from the 3rd district
- In office July 1, 1941 – June 30, 1953
- Preceded by: Stephen W. Cunningham
- Succeeded by: Robert M. Wilkinson

Personal details
- Born: James Win Austin; November 11, 1879 Chicago, Illinois, U.S.
- Died: August 18, 1964 (aged 84) Honolulu, Hawaii, U.S.
- Party: Republican
- Spouse: Helen Teagan (m. 1904; died 1951)
- Children: 2

James Win Austin (November 11, 1879 – August 18, 1964) was a retired businessman who became a Los Angeles, California, City Council member from 1941 to 1953. He was earlier on the Police and Health commissions.

== Biography ==
Austin was an executive of a graphite, a lead and a bridge company in Detroit, Michigan. He retired and moved to Los Angeles in 1928 or 1929, living at 722 South Beverly Glen Boulevard. He was a member of the Los Angeles Country Club and founded an organization for the preservation of California history—Los Rancheros de San Jose Breakfast Club. He had a son, Edmund. After retiring in 1955, Austin and his wife moved to Wailaia Kahala, Hawaii.

== Public service ==
In 1939, Mayor Fletcher Bowron appointed Austin to the Board of Health Commissioners, and in 1940 he was on the Board of Police Commissioners.

=== Elections ===
Austin ran for the 3rd District spot being vacated by Stephen W. Cunningham in 1941 and overcame the first-round lead of Paul V. Parker to win in the final vote, 10,446 to Parker's 8,649. In 1943, he beat Parker 7,587 to 575 in the primary. He was reelected every two years thereafter but did not run in 1953.

=== Positions ===
==== Police Commission ====
Uniforms, 1940. The commission adopted his motion to require police officers, except those on plainclothes duty, to wear uniforms while working.

Speed, 1941. He opposed a proposal to raise the highway speed limit to 65 miles an hour.

Dancers, 1941. His proposal that taxi dancers be required to undergo physical examination twice a year as a condition in issuing permits to dance halls brought a ruling from City Attorney Ray L. Chesebro that "such a requirement would not stand up in the courts on the grounds that it would be unreasonable."

Tunnels, 1941. Austin's motion directing the chief of police to stop "the practice of motorists tooting prolonged blasts on their auto horns while passing through the Second and Third Street tunnels" was adopted by the commission.

==== City Council ====
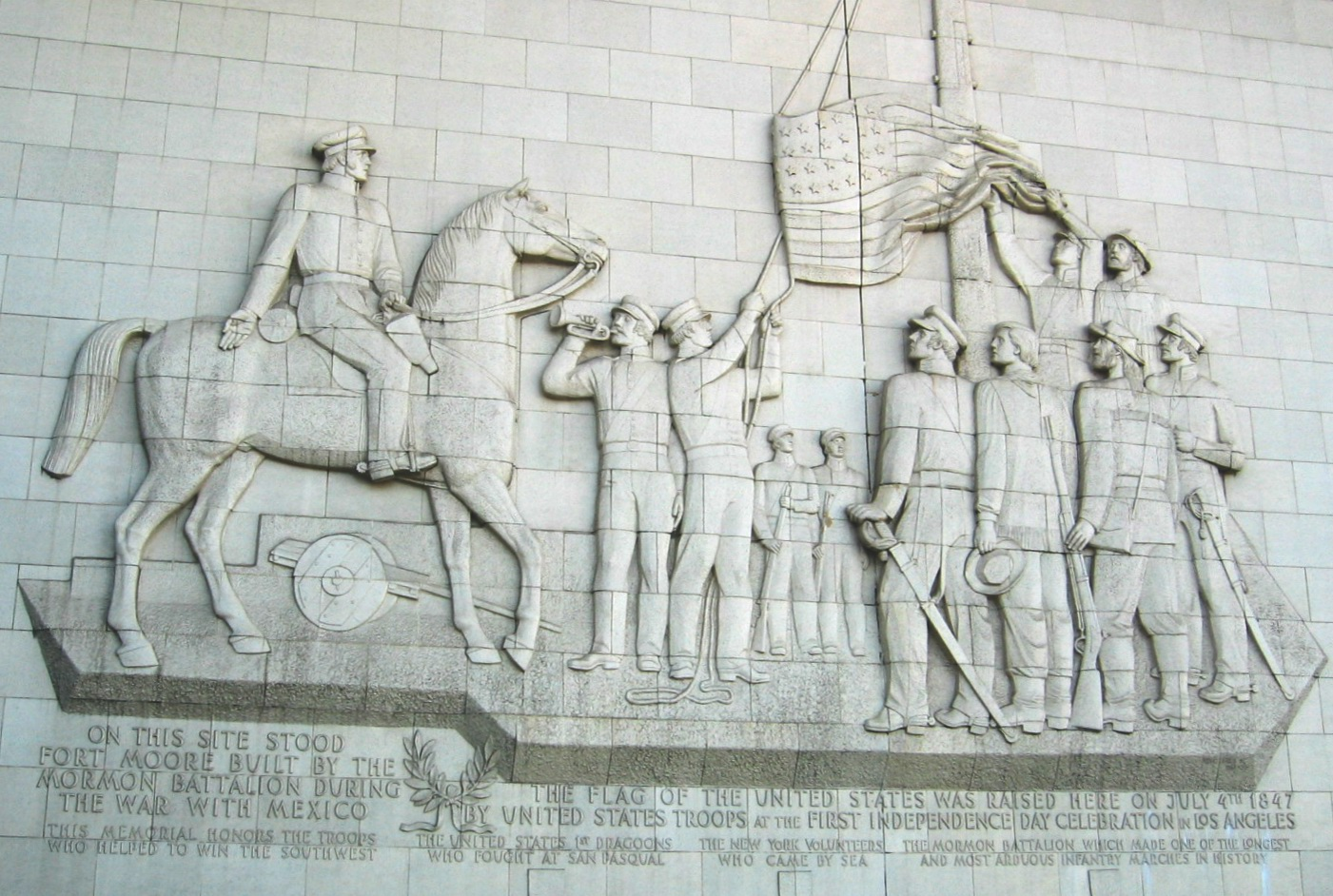
Fort Moore Pioneer Memorial

Noise, 1953. Austin scored noise "both in the skies and on the streets" and asked Police Chief William H. Parker to "take some action to quiet it down," perhaps by requiring mufflers on low-flying airplanes that "disturb thousands." He also was critical of "exhaust sounds of automobiles, mostly from foreign-made cars."

Monument, 1953. He opposed the proposed allocation of $75,000 as the city's share of building a monument atop Fort Moore Hill to honor the pioneers who raised the first American flag in Los Angeles.

No protest, 1953. Austin spent the last day of his term in "almost continuous session" with seven other conservative members of the City Council while police were searching for the missing members to make up a quorum so that business could take place. The missing men were boycotting the council over the proposed elimination of a public-housing program. The boycott ended the next day when new members were seated.

Preceded by Stephen W. Cunningham	Los Angeles City Council; 3rd district 1941–53	Succeeded by Robert M. Wilkinson
