= Isaac F. Hughes =

American businessman and politician (1861–1931)

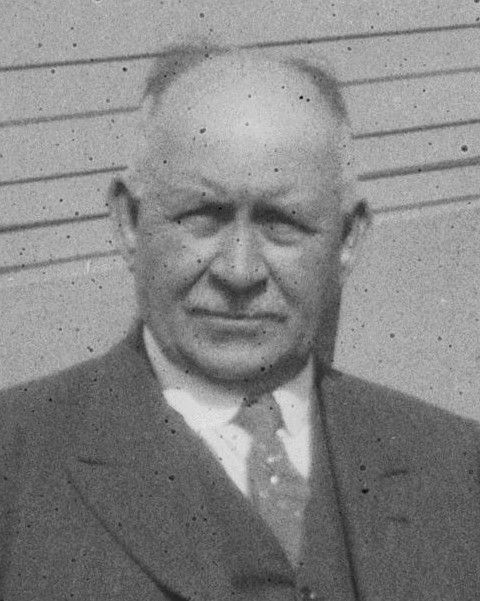
- Hughes in 1927

Member of the Los Angeles City Council for the 5th district
- In office July 1, 1925 – June 30, 1927
- Preceded by: District established
- Succeeded by: Ernest L. Webster

Personal details
- Born: Isaac F. Hughes; July 29, 1861 Paulsboro, New Jersey, United States
- Died: January 18, 1931 (aged 69) Los Angeles, California, United States
- Party: Republican
- Spouse: Sarah Elizabeth Griffitts (m. 1881)
- Children: 5
- Occupation: Miller, grocer, businessman

Isaac Fremont Hughes (July 29, 1861 – January 17, 1931) was an American miller, grocer, and businessman who was the first representative of Los Angeles City Council District 3 after a new city charter went into effect in 1925. He served for two years, until 1927.

== Biography ==
Hughes was born on July 29, 1861, in Paulsboro, New Jersey, and was brought up on a farm in Lawrence, Kansas. His father was William Madora Hughes (February 14, 1809 - March 12, 1876) and his mother was Sarah S. Abrams. At age 18 he began work in a flour mill and continued as a miller and in the grocery business for the next 27 years. He was a member of the city council in Lawrence for four years and a county commissioner in Douglas County for six. He was married to Sarah Elizabeth Griffitts on October 17, 1881, in Trenton, Missouri. Their children were Herbert Franklyn, Earl Everett, Ray Albert, Faye Emma and Isaac Lester.

He moved to Los Angeles in 1906 and was proprietor for fourteen years of a grocery at Washington and Arlington Streets. Upon retirement in 1923, Hughes was appointed to the Recreation and Playground Commission, where he devoted his efforts to developing the Queen Anne Playground. His wife recalled in an interview that playgrounds were his hobby and that he visited them in many parts of the country. He was a Republican, a Methodist, a Mason and a member of the City Club. He died January 17, 1931, at his home, 1223 South Orange Drive, Los Angeles.

== City Council ==
In 1925, the 3rd District lay mostly south of the Santa Monica Mountains east of Sawtelle, with its eastern boundary at Western Avenue, and its southern boundary running along Washington Boulevard to embrace the Palms area. It included the Los Angeles Country Club and the Sawtelle district, and all the Santa Monica Mountains west of Sawtelle to the Ventura County line, including Pacific Palisades and Topanga Canyon.

Hughes was chosen over Edwin O. Loucks in the June 1925 election, 4,981 votes to 2,661.

Known as a defender of Mayor George E. Cryer and political figure Kent Kane Parrot, Hughes was defeated in the 1927 election by Ernest L. Webster.

Preceded by —	Los Angeles City Council; 3rd district 1925–1927	Succeeded by Ernest L. Webster
