= Camp Kearny =

Former military base in California, United States

Coordinates: 32.8659831°N 117.1030354°W

- Linda Vista, California
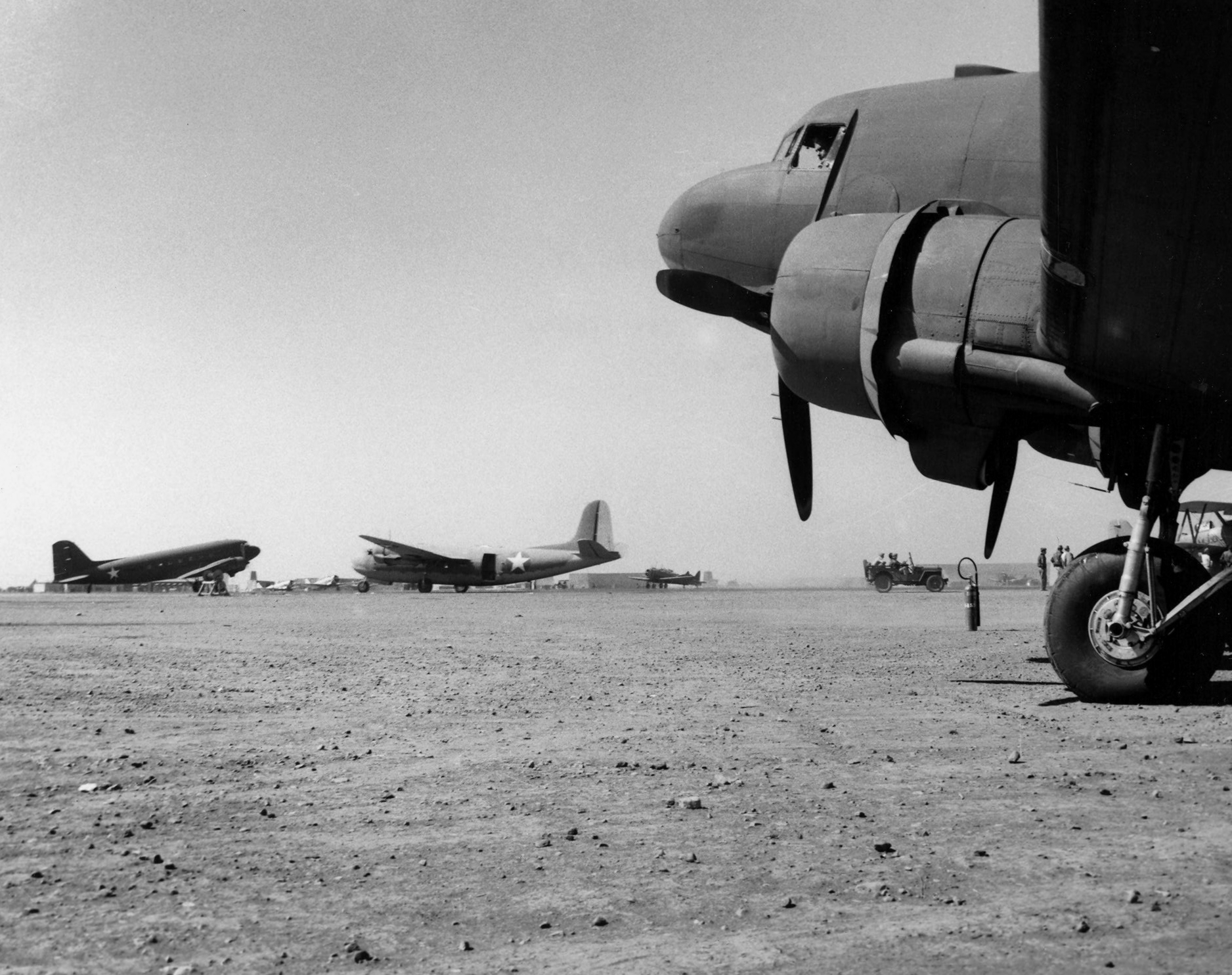
- View of the flight line at Camp Kearny, 1945

Site information
- Type: Military base

Location
- Location of Camp Kearny

Site history
- Built: 1917
- Built by: Quartermaster Corps
- In use: 1917–1946
- Events: World War I, World War II

Garrison information
- Past commanders: James S. McKnight; Joseph E. Kuhn

Camp Kearny was a U.S. military base located in Linda Vista, California. Established in 1917, it was named for Brigadier General Stephen W. Kearny. Camp Kearny closed in 1946.

== History ==
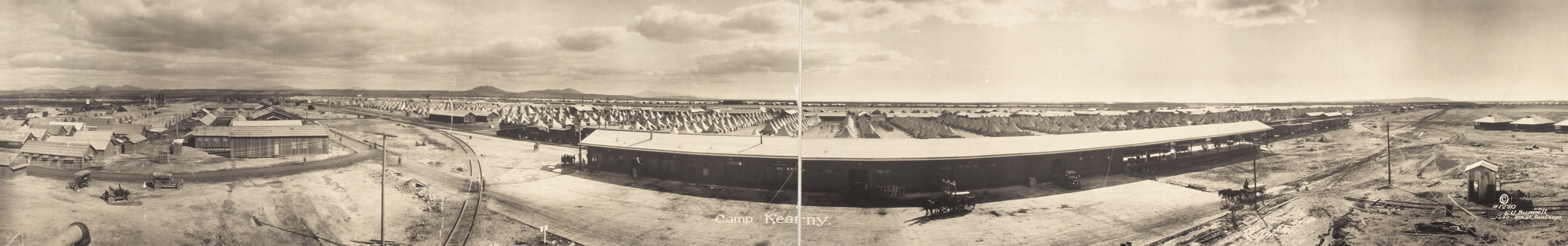
Panorama of Camp Kearny in 1918

=== Establishment and early years ===
Target at Camp Kearny after bombardment by shrapnel; World War I era

The camp was established by the Army in 1917 on 12,721 acres (51.48 km^{2}) of land on a mesa north of San Diego. The area included the 2,130-acre (8.6 km^{2}) Miramar Ranch, which had originally been established by newspaperman E. W. Scripps and later sold to the Jessop family. It was Scripps who named the area Miramar, meaning "view of the sea".

The new base was named in honor of Brigadier General Stephen W. Kearny, a leader in the Mexican–American War who also served as a military governor of California. Camp Kearny was one of 32 new camps created by the Army in 1917 as a mobilization and training facility for troops on their way to battlegrounds of World War I. The first commander was Major James S. McKnight. Army aircraft occasionally landed on the parade ground, but an actual airfield was not established during World War I.

After the war, the camp was used as a demobilization center; Joseph E. Kuhn commanded the post until it was closed in 1920. It was largely abandoned after 1920 but was retained by the government for use as a military and civilian airfield. The U.S. Public Health Service used it for a time. In 1927 the Ryan Aircraft Company used the field to weight-test the plane Spirit of St. Louis, which they were then building for Charles A. Lindbergh. During 1929–1930 the facility was known as Airtech Field, operated by the San Diego Air Service Corp.

=== United States Navy use ===
In 1932 the Navy installed a mooring mast for helium dirigibles on the base. The mast was used for visits by the Navy's two enormous airships, the USS Akron and USS Macon, each 785 feet (239 m) long. The Akron first visited Camp Kearny on 11 May 1932. That mooring ended in disaster when a gust of wind carried the airship upward, killing two ground handlers and injuring a third. However, the Navy continued to use the facility, and the Macon moored at Camp Kearny four times during 1934. The airships were homeported at Moffett Field in Sunnyvale, California, whose civic leaders had won a vigorous public relations battle with San Diego in the late 1920s to become the host of the Navy's airfield for dirigibles.

In 1940 the Navy began a series of projects to improve and expand Camp Kearny. By 1941 the base contained more than 26,000 acres (110 km^{2}). On 20 February 1943, the area was commissioned as Naval Auxiliary Air Station Camp Kearny. (By then the misspelling "Kearney" had become so common that the base was actually commissioned as "NAAS Camp Kearney".) It had three runways: a 3,000 feet (910 m) asphalt runway mainly used for aircraft parking, and two 6,000 feet (1,800 m) concrete runways. The primary mission of the base was training pilots in the use of PB4Y Liberators (B-24s), which were built by the nearby Consolidated Aircraft Company.

=== United States Marine Corps use ===
In 1934 part of the base was leased to the Marine Corps to use for maneuvers and gunnery ranges. At the beginning of World War II the Marines took over the northern portion of Camp Kearny, which they christened Marine Corps Air Depot Camp Kearny. In 1943 the Marines changed their station name to Marine Corps Air Depot Miramar to avoid confusion with the Navy base. The Marine base was mainly used to process Marine squadrons en route to the South Pacific. At various times it was the headquarters of Marine Aircraft Group 11, Marine Aircraft Group 12, Marine Aircraft Group 13, Marine Aircraft Group 14, Marine Aircraft Group 15 and Marine Air Warning Group 2 (MAWG-2) before they deployed to the Pacific.

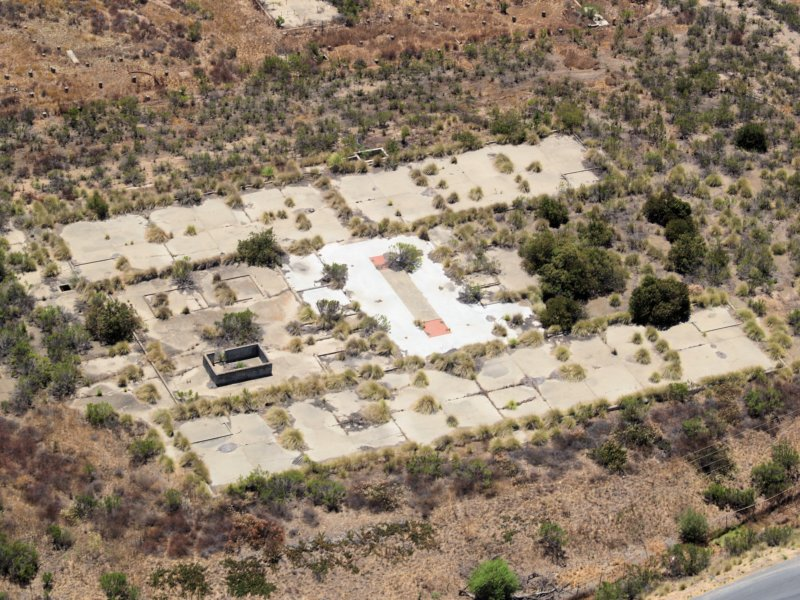
Aerial view of some of the ruins of Camp Elliott, 2011

The Marines also developed a training base on the grounds of Camp Kearny called Camp Holcomb, named for Major-General Thomas Holcomb who was then commandant of the Marine Corps. By 1940 the number of volunteer recruits was overwhelming the local training base, Marine Corps Recruit Depot San Diego, so the Marines replaced Camp Holcomb with a much larger training base directly east of Camp Kearny which was called Camp Elliott, named for George F. Elliott, a former commandant of the Marine Corps. Camp Elliott was used mostly as a replacement and casual center during World War II. It was turned over to the Navy in June 1944 because of the service's pressing need for additional facilities to use as a personnel distribution center.

After the end of the war, the Navy used Camp Kearny for demobilization. On 1 May 1946, the Navy departed Camp Kearny, handing it over to the Marines, and the station became MCAS Miramar. In 1947, the Marines moved to MCAS El Toro in Orange County, California, and Miramar was redesignated as a Naval Auxiliary Air Station, NAAS Miramar, followed by upgrade to full air station status as a Master Jet Base and renamed NAS Miramar. Miramar remains active in 2021, as home to the 3rd Marine Aircraft Wing, the aviation element of the 1st Marine Expeditionary Force.

== Rosedale Naval Outlying Landing Field ==
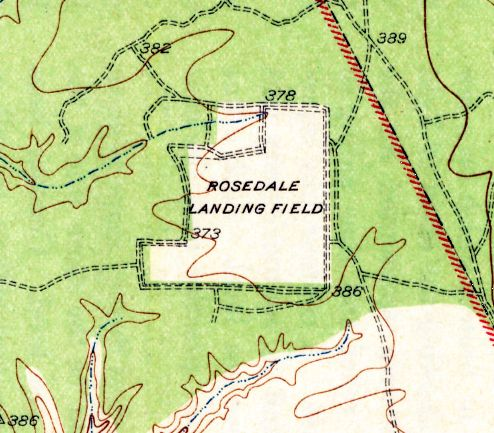
Rosedale Naval Outlying Landing Field map

Rosedale Naval Outlying Landing Field was built as Rosedale Field in 1938 just south of Camp Kearny. Rosedale Field was used for San Diego Naval Air Station's aircraft carrier plane high-altitude bombing, dive-bombing and strafing practice, and also for emergency landing activities. After the war in 1945, the Landing Field was abandoned and no trace remains.

== See also ==
- California during World War II
- List of United States Marine Corps bases
