= James Stuart McKnight =

American politician and lawyer (1884-1950)

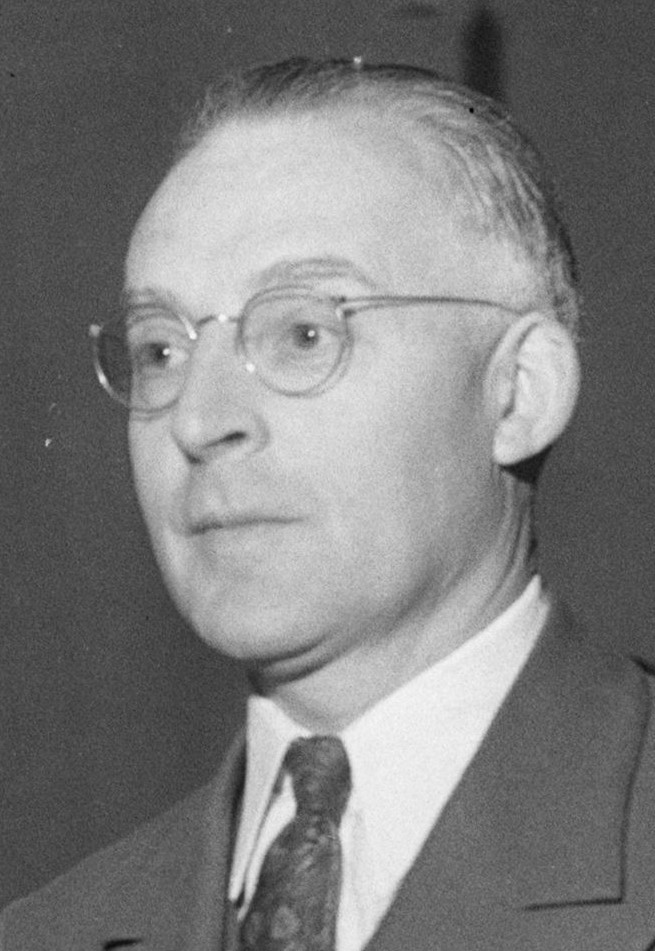
- McKnight in 1933

Member of the California State Assembly from the 75th district
- In office January 4, 1915 – January 8, 1917
- Preceded by: Lyman Farwell
- Succeeded by: Edwin T. Baker

Member of the Los Angeles City Council for the 3rd district
- In office July 1, 1931 – June 30, 1933
- Preceded by: Ernest L. Webster
- Succeeded by: Stephen W. Cunningham

Personal details
- Born: November 15, 1884 Green Bay, Wisconsin, US
- Died: December 25, 1950 (aged 66) Los Angeles, California, US
- Party: Progressive
- Spouse: Anita King (m. 1919)
- Education: University of Southern California

Military service
- Branch/service: United States National Guard; California National Guard
- Rank: Major
- Battles/wars: World War I

James Stuart McKnight (November 15, 1884 – December 25, 1950) was a National Guard officer who served in World War I, an attorney and a member of the City Council in Los Angeles, California, in 1931 and 1932. He also served in the California State Assembly for the 75th district from 1915 to 1917.

== Biography ==
A native of Green Bay, Wisconsin, McKnight graduated from Los Angeles High School and from the University of Southern California Law School. In March 1919, McKnight was married in Paris, France, to motion picture actress Anita King.

McKnight was known as a sharp dresser. "His clothes are always well pressed, his hanky peeks from the top coat pocket, his glasses are always polished, and his fair hair is always neatly brushed back from his high forehead." McKnight was a Mason.

He died on December 25, 1950, and was buried with military services at Sawtelle Cemetery in West Los Angeles. McKnight was survived by his widow, Velma, and a daughter, also named Velma, and a brother, Robert B. McKnight.

== Professional life ==
=== Military ===
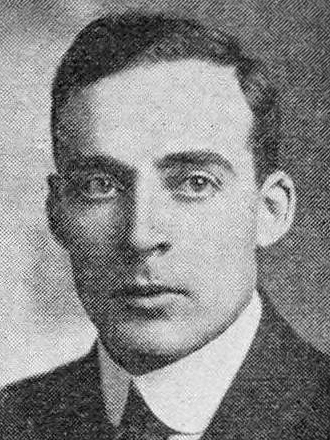
McKnight in 1915.

After earning his law degree from the University of Southern California in 1908, McKnight was associated with Ralph A. Chase in a law practice for ten years. When the California National Guard was called up for duty on the Mexico–United States border in 1916, he joined the Guard as a lieutenant, serving with the 7th California Infantry at Nogales, Arizona.

"In March, 1917, he was made a major, and in August he was sent to Camp Kearny with the Third Battalion, becoming first commander of the camp and being in charge until Frederick Smith Strong took command of the division. . . . in July, 1918, Col. McKnight went overseas and attended the School of the Line at Langres, France. Returning to the One Hundred and Sixtieth Infantry he trained officers for a time and was then sent to the front with reserves for the First Army. When the Armistice was signed he was assigned to duty with Herbert Hoover in Paris for service in the American food relief work."

According to his wife, Anita, McKnight was promoted to lieutenant colonel in May 1919 and was retained in an executive capacity in Paris when "the American Relief Administration began to close all its missions and all financial matters were taken over by the United States Grain Corporation."

He was appointed assistant adjutant-general of the California National Guard by Governor William Stephens on November 17, 1919. He later became president of the Los Angeles Infantry Regiment Association but resigned that position under duress when it was charged he had demanded a ten percent cut from a fund-raiser hired by the association. An investigation was undertaken by a board of inquiry and, after fifteen witnesses were heard, at the end McKnight was ordered by his superior, Adjutant-General Boree, to resign. His resignation in 1921 caused him to lose his National Guard rank of colonel; he "was a major in the Federal service before being appointed by the governor." He did, however, use the title of colonel when a member of the American Legion in Long Beach, California, and at other times.

=== Civilian ===
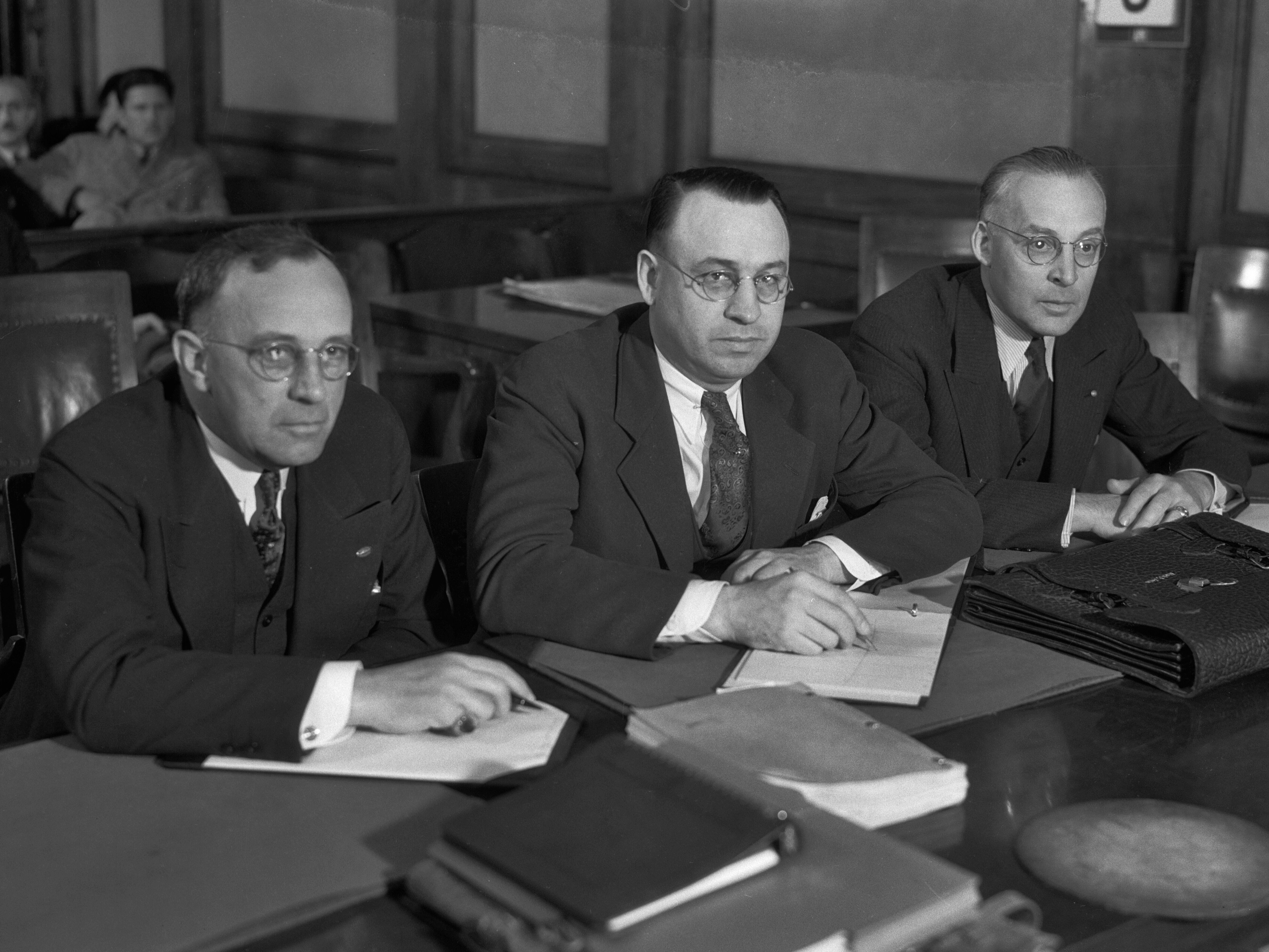
McKnight with his defense attorneys in 1933.

McKnight returned to his law practice in Los Angeles. In June 1930, McKnight represented Mrs. Anna Butcher, a sister of pioneer temperance advocate Carrie Nation in a competence hearing.

In June 1931 McKnight unseated incumbent councilman Ernest L. Webster in a victory in the Third District. McKnight was one of the six council members who in July 1931 lost a vote to appeal a judge's decision ordering an end to racial restrictions in city-operated swimming pools. The pools had previously been restricted by race to certain days or hours. An appeal would have delayed or ended desegregation.

In April 1933, a jury in Judge Fletcher Bowron's court found him innocent of a criminal charge that he had lied to a grand jury about the renewal of a city contract with a Fontana, California, company for garbage disposal, but in 1934 he and former Councilman Roy Donley were tried on a charge of agreeing to accept a $10,000 bribe to influence their votes on the garbage contract. Both were acquitted. McKnight lost his seat in the 1933 election to Stephen W. Cunningham, graduate manager of the Associated Students at UCLA. In December 1934, McKnight was found guilty of four counts of mailing "defamatory and libelous matter" about Cunningham through the mail and was sentenced by U.S. District Court Judge [Paul John] McCormick to six months in jail, suspended for two years.

== See also ==
- List of members of the American Legion

Preceded by Ernest L. Webster	Los Angeles City Council; 3rd district 1927–31	Succeeded by Stephen W. Cunningham
