= Larchmont, Los Angeles =

- Neighborhood of Los Angeles
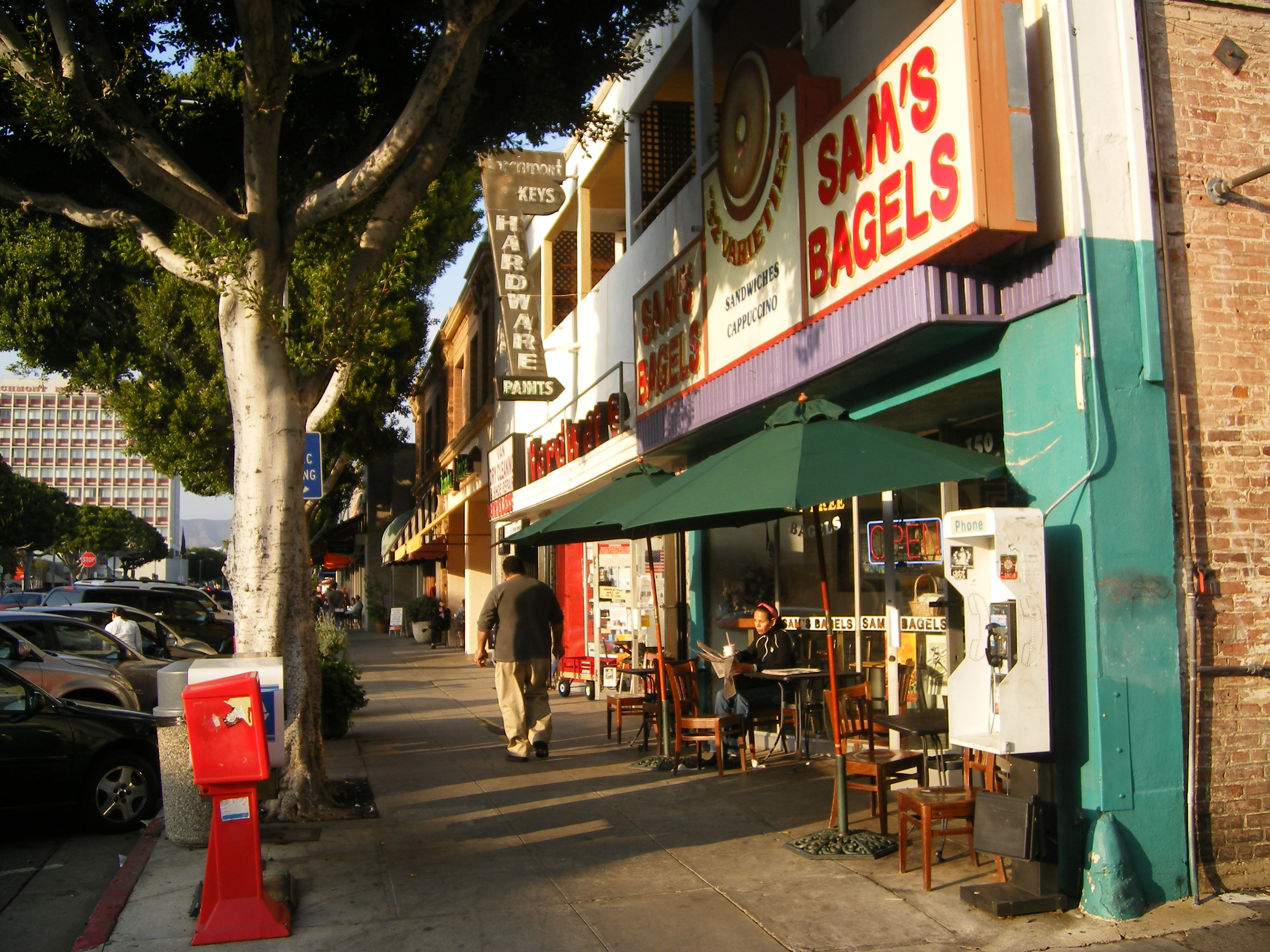
- Larchmont Village in 2006

- Location within Central Los Angeles
- Coordinates: 34.0786°N 118.3237°W
- Country: United States
- State: California
- County: Los Angeles
- Time zone: Pacific

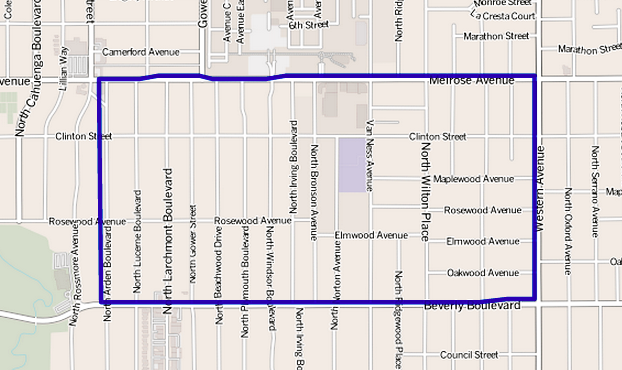
Map of Larchmont, Los Angeles, as delineated by the Los Angeles Times

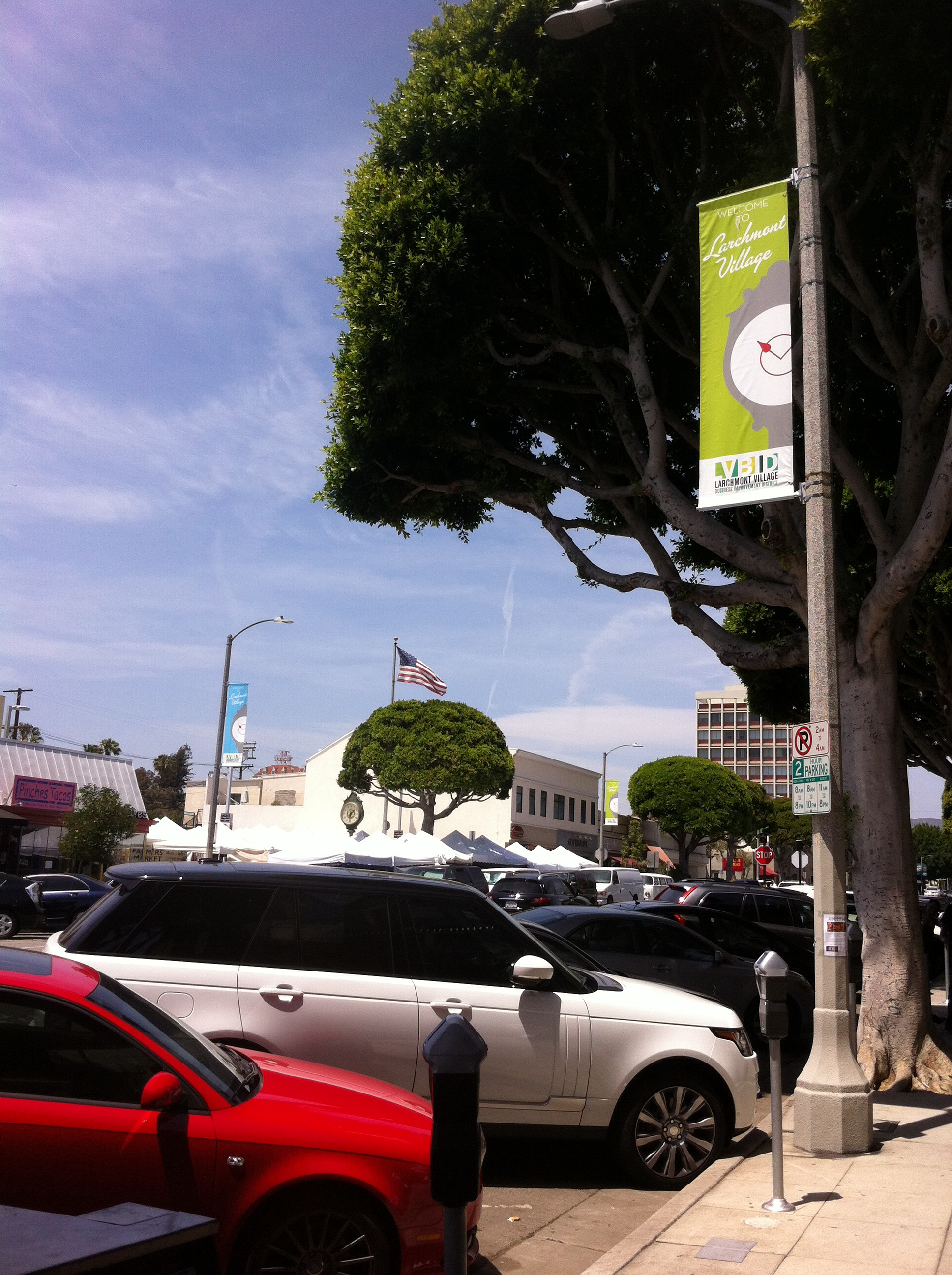
Larchmont village with farmers market

Larchmont is a half-square-mile neighborhood in the central region of the City of Los Angeles, California. It has three schools and one small park. It has been the site of early and recent motion picture shoots.

== Geography ==
According to the Greater Wilshire Neighborhood Council and the Larchmont Village Neighborhood Association, Larchmont's boundaries are Melrose Avenue on the north, Wilton Place on the east, Beverly Boulevard on the south, and Arden Boulevard on the west. Adjacent neighborhoods are Hollywood to the north, Wilshire Center to the east, Windsor Square to the south, and Hancock Park to the west.

According to the Mapping L.A. project of the Los Angeles Times, Larchmont is flanked by Hollywood to the north, East Hollywood to the east, Koreatown to the southeast, Windsor Square to the south and Hancock Park to the west. Street boundaries are Melrose Avenue on the north, Western Avenue on the east, Beverly Boulevard on the south and North Arden Boulevard on the west.

== History ==
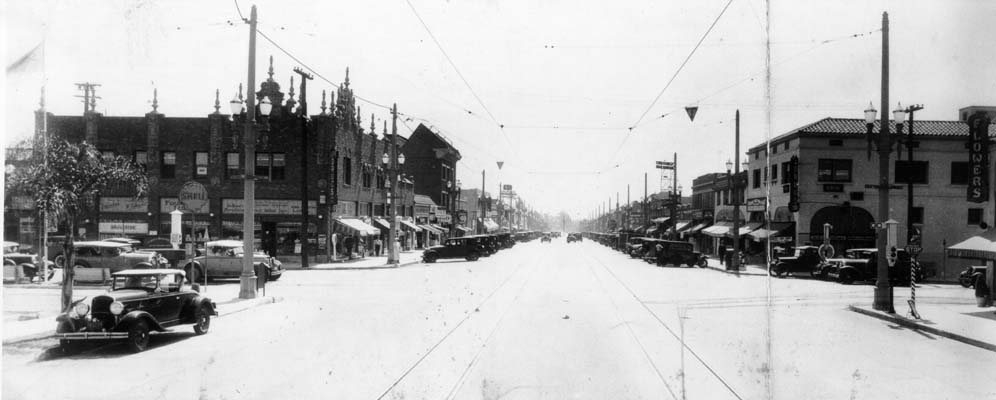
Larchmont Blvd., looking south (circa 1920–25)

Larchmont Village's commercial district was established in 1920 to serve nearby residential neighborhoods, including Windsor Square, Windsor Heights, and Marlborough Square. Much of the district was constructed between 1921 and 1928, with developer Julius La Bonte responsible for approximately 70 percent of its early commercial buildings.

Larchmont was originally named Glenwood. The name was changed to Larchmont in 1912, most likely after Larchmont, New York on the Long Island Sound. In the early 1920s, Larchmont, New York (a village in the Town of Mamaroneck) was a center of movie making. According to the New York Times, "In those days, the area was less the"East Coast Hollywood" than Hollywood was “the West Coast Mamaroneck.”"

== Population ==
The 2000 U.S. census counted 8,631 residents in the 0.49-square-mile neighborhood—an average of 17,747 people per square mile, one of the highest densities in the county. In 2008, the city estimated that the population had increased to 9,195. The median age for residents was 34, about average for Los Angeles; the percentages of residents aged 19 to 49 and above were among the county's highest.

Larchmont was highly diverse ethnically, and the percentage of Asians was comparatively high. The breakdown was Latinos, 37.2%; Asians, 30%; whites, 24.6%; blacks, 3%, and others, 5.3%. Korea (28.3%) and Guatemala (16.8%) were the most common places of birth for the 56% of the residents who were born abroad, a high figure compared to rest of the city.

The median yearly household income in 2008 dollars was $47,780, average for Los Angeles, but a high percentage of households had an income of $20,000 or less. The average household size of 2.5 people was average for the city of Los Angeles. Renters occupied 72.9% of the housing stock, and house- or apartment owners 27.1%.

The percentages of never-married men and women, 42.1% and 36.9%, respectively, were among the county's highest.

== Education ==
About thirty-two percent of Larchmont residents aged 25 and older had earned a bachelor's degree, with over 60% percent having a high school education level, an average figure for the city.

The schools operating within the Larchmont borders are:

- Christ the King School, private, 617 North Arden Boulevard (Opened 1959, TK–8)
- Frances Blend Special Education Center, public, 5210 Clinton Street (Opened 1926, merged with Van Ness in 2013)
- Van Ness Avenue Elementary School, LAUSD, 501 North Van Ness Avenue

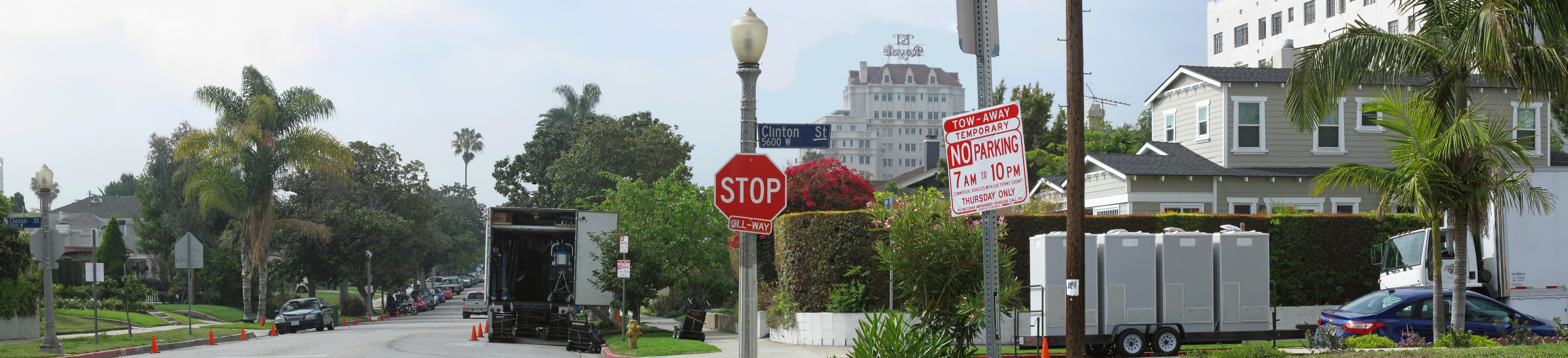
A view of Larchmont and a filming setup, 2012

== Recreation and parks ==
- Robert L. Burns Park, 4900 Beverly Boulevard, unstaffed pocket park with a play area and picnic tables.

== Businesses ==
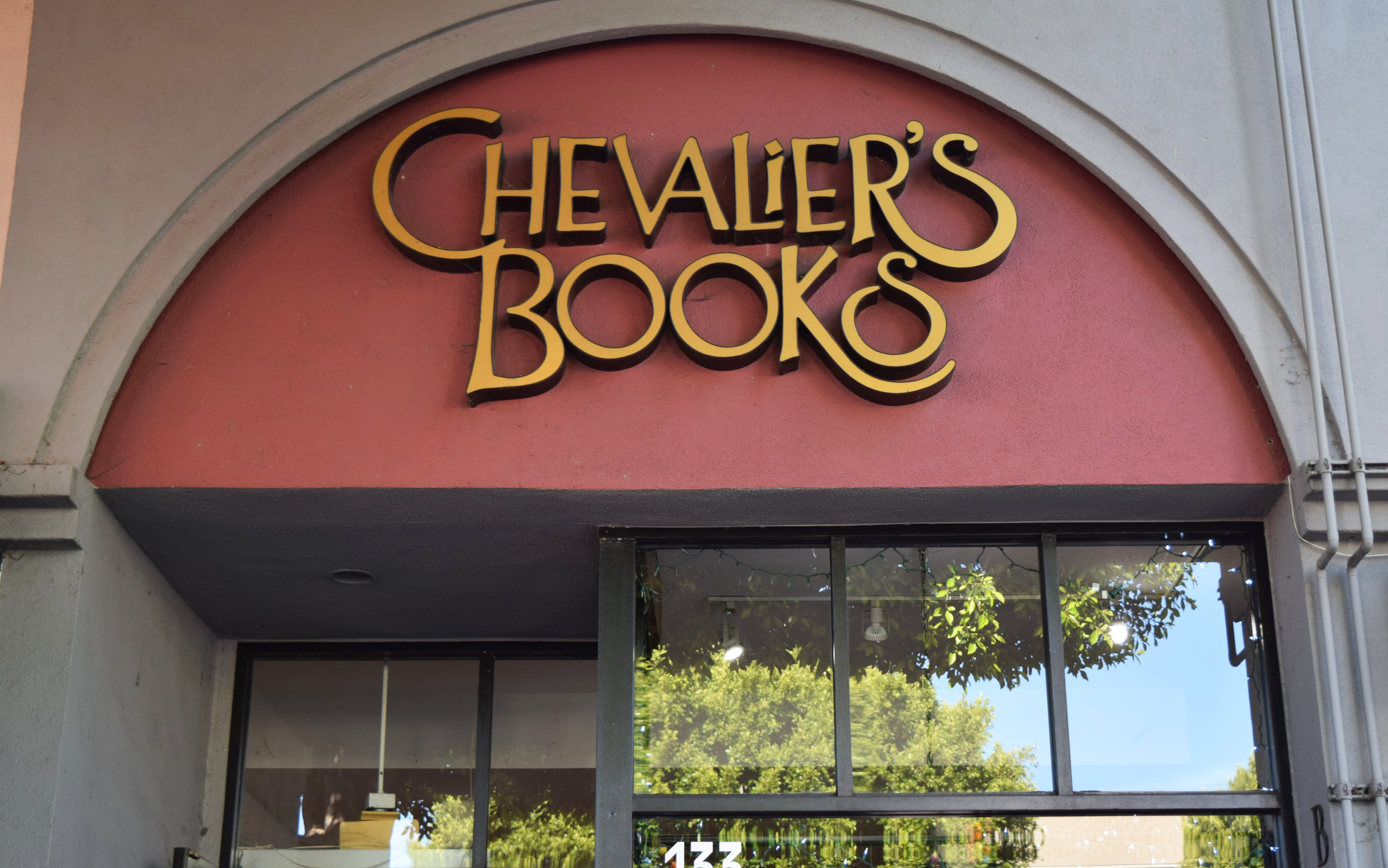
Signage for Chevalier's Books

Chevalier's Books, the oldest independent bookstore in Los Angeles, is on its main boulevard.

Page Academy, which sits on the largest continuous parcel of property on Larchmont Blvd.

The Larchmont Chronicle is the print newspaper for the local community, founded by Jane Gilman and Dawne Goodwin in 1963. It is now being published by the Hutcheson Publishing Group.

== Notable residents ==
- Ernest L. Webster, Los Angeles City Council member, 1927–31
- Judy Greer, actress
- Mindy Kaling, writer, producer, actress, comedian
- Adriana Caselotti, actress and singer, original voice of Snow White in the iconic 1937 Disney film Snow White and the Seven Dwarfs
- Kumail Nanjiani, actor, writer, and stand-up comedian
- Emily Gordon, writer, producer, and podcast host

== See also ==
- Radium Sulphur Springs
