= Stephen W. Cunningham =

American politician

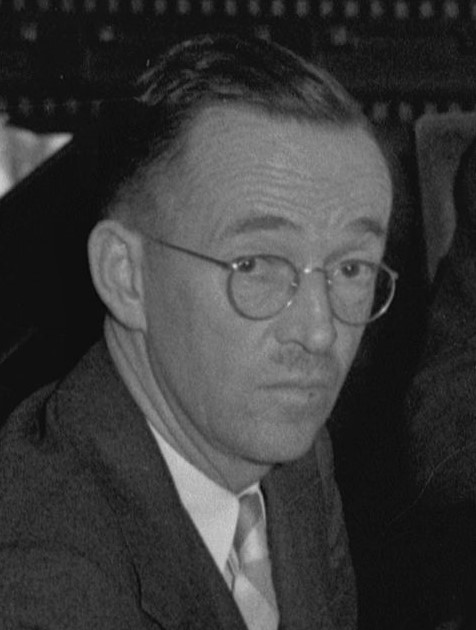
- Cunningham in 1935

Member of the Los Angeles City Council from the 3rd district
- In office July 1, 1933 – June 30, 1941
- Preceded by: James Stuart McKnight
- Succeeded by: J. Win Austin

Personal details
- Born: Stephen William Cunningham; June 29, 1886 San Bernardino, California
- Died: June 28, 1956 (aged 69) Brentwood, Los Angeles
- Party: Republican
- Spouse: Frances Lippincott Flint (m. 1919)
- Children: 3

Stephen William Cunningham (July 29, 1886 – July 28, 1956) was the first graduate manager at the Southern Branch of the University of California, later UCLA, and a member of the Los Angeles City Council from 1933 to 1941.

== Personal life ==
Cunningham was born July 29, 1886, in San Bernardino, California, the son of Reuben F. Cunningham of Nova Scotia and Annie B. Magee of Ohio. He was educated in the San Bernardino and Riverside public schools and earned a Bachelor of Science degree from the University of California, Berkeley, in 1910. He was president of the student body there.

Cunningham was married to Frances Lippincott Flint of Los Angeles in 1919. They had three children, John Stephen, Donald Edward and Frances Ann (Mrs. Ann Bauman).

== Early career ==
After graduating from Berkeley in 1910, he worked in advertising for three years, then as a broker for five, all in San Francisco. He had attempted to enlist in the Army in World War I but was rejected as underweight. Later he got in under a special classification and served as a sergeant in the Air Service. From 1921 to 1924 he was secretary for the Southern California Canning Association.

== Graduate manager ==
In 1925, Cunningham was named graduate manager for the Associated Students at the Southern Branch of the University of California, a position that had generally the same duties and powers as that of an association general manager. As such, he accomplished tasks like arranging for the Grizzlies, as the athletics teams were known, to play against the Oregon State Aggies in the basketball pavilion at the University of Southern California and with Occidental College in the Olympic Auditorium. In 1928 he was secretary of the Coaches' and Managers' Association of the Pacific Coast Conference.

He was credited with bringing William H. Spaulding to the campus as a football coach and starting improvements that landed the university in the Pacific Coast Conference. He oversaw the transition of the Associated Students organization when the university moved from the old Vermont Avenue campus to the new campus in Westwood in 1929.

In 1931 a move began at UCLA to bring in a manager who had actually graduated from the Los Angeles campus, with tennis coach William C. Ackerman as the favorite. Cunningham was offered a one-year extension on his contract, but a student protest resulted in the term being extended to two years, with Ackerman to take over at the end of that time.

In one of his final acts as graduate manager, Cunningham told a City Council session in December 1932 that UCLA would not approve a council decision to give the University of Southern California Trojans eight preferred dates at the Los Angeles Coliseum for the succeeding ten years while the UCLA Bruins were to receive only five. The matter was eventually settled by agreement.

== Career in City Council ==
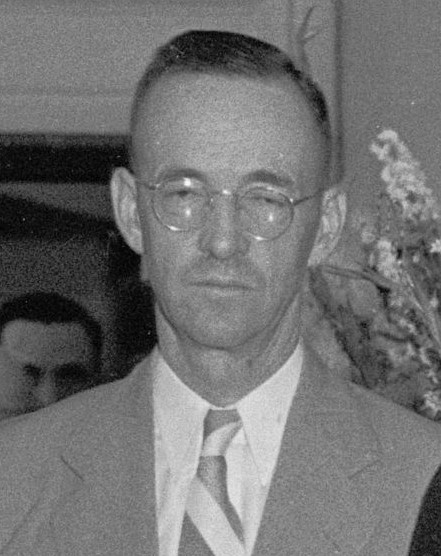
Cunningham in 1935 after his re-election.

=== Elections ===
In 1933, Los Angeles City Council District 3 was bounded on the south by Pico Boulevard, east by Highland Avenue, north by Hollywood Hills, extending west to the ocean and Santa Monica Canyon." It included the Westside and the UCLA campus.

That was the year that Cunningham ran against the incumbent 3rd District councilman James Stuart McKnight and was elected almost 3–1, with 15,698 votes against McKnight's 5,582. In December 1934, McKnight was found guilty of four counts of mailing "defamatory and libelous matter" about Cunningham through the mail and was sentenced by U.S. District Court Judge [Paul John] McCormick to six months in jail, suspended for two years.

Cunningham was reelected in 1935 over the End Poverty in California candidate, James M. Carter; in 1937 and 1939 he had no opponents. In 1941 Republican Cunningham ran for mayor against Democrat Fletcher Bowron, and was defeated, by 149,195 votes against Bowron's 181,582.

=== Controversies ===
In 1934, Cunningham introduced a council resolution that would outlaw the use of concrete pipes in sanitary (street) sewers in favor of vitrified clay pipe, noting that the concrete piping disintegrated rapidly from the effects of sewer gas.

Cunningham had one time made repeated efforts to rid Westwood Village, just south of the UCLA campus, of bookmakers who were doing business with university students. He told the City Council in 1936:

I reported the matter to the Police Commission. The police went out there but could find only a punchboard operating, for which an arrest was made. The place is still operating as a bookmaking establishment. Word was brought to me by a friend who got it from someone connected with the bookmaking business, and I was told that I would not live much longer if I kept on monkeying with bookmaking.

In 1937, Introducing a resolution to rewrite Los Angeles's anti-picketing ordinance, Cunningham said that

When men like Harry Bridges and Dave Beck come into Los Angeles and attempt by show of force to intimidate workers and force them to join some organization or not work, then we must . . . do what we can to see that men can go about their normal pursuits in a peaceful way without interference.

Council Member Parley Parker Christensen lauded Bridges and Beck and a recent seamen's strike as a "magnificent demonstration" and questioned Cunningham's patriotism, to which the latter replied that he would challenge his patriotism against that of Christensen "to any proof."

In 1940, when he was considered an authority on the street and highway development, Cunningham was instrumental in lobbying Governor Culbert Olson for approval of a Hollywood Express Highway from downtown.

Cunningham succeeded in killing a Federally subsidized public housing program in Sawtelle in 1940, by a 9–6 vote in the City Council.

A recording device was found in 1941 at the Biltmore Apartments at 330 South Grand Avenue, with the wiring leading to Cunningham's mayoralty campaign headquarters at 1031 South Broadway. A "complete log" of Cunningham's telephone calls was left on a table. Police investigation followed.

== Later life ==
After he left the City Council, Cunningham continued to be "very well known at City Hall" as the head of Stephen W. Cunningham and Associates, zoning consultants and land use specialists, with offices at 3233 Wilshire Boulevard. In 1948 he was on a Los Angeles committee against "featherbedding" in the railroad industry, a practice requiring extra employees on freight trains. He died in his home in Brentwood on July 28, 1956, the day before his 70th birthday, and was buried at Evergreen Cemetery in Riverside, California.

Preceded by James Stuart McKnight	Los Angeles City Council; 3rd district 1931–41	Succeeded by J. Win Austin
