= Hellman, Haas & Co. =

Los Angeles grocer

- Formerly: Haas, Baruch & Co. (after 1890)
- Company type: Private
- Industry: Grocery / Wholesale
- Founded: Early 1870s
- Founders: Abraham Haas; Herman W. Hellman; Bernard Cohn
- Fate: Evolved into Haas, Baruch & Co., predecessor of Smart & Final
- Headquarters: Los Angeles, California, United States
- Number of locations: 218–224 N. Los Angeles Street (1880s–1890); Moved to 118–124 N. Los Angeles Street (1889, later renumbered 218–224)
- Area served: Los Angeles
- Key people: Abraham Haas; Herman W. Hellman; Bernard Cohn; Herman Baruch; Jacob Baruch
- Products: Grocery items, food staples, drugs, explosives

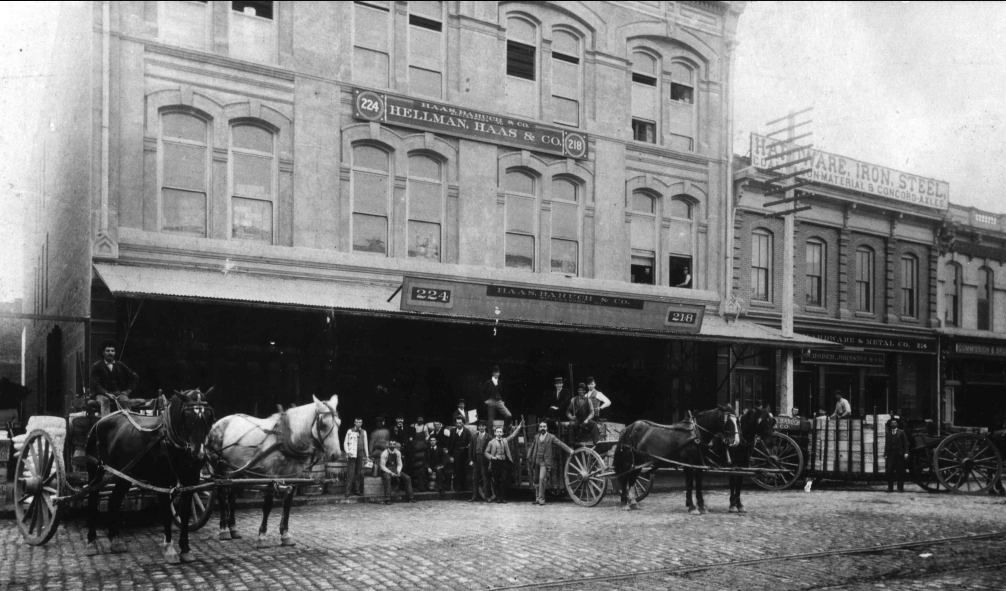
Haas, Baruch & Co., successor to Hellman, Haas & Co., SE corner of Los Angeles and Aliso St., 1880s

Hellman, Haas & Co. (until 1890, then Haas, Baruch & Co.), was one of the first grocers in early Los Angeles, beginning in the early 1870s as a partnership of Abraham Haas, Herman W. Hellman, and Bernard Cohn, and a predecessor company of Smart & Final. In the 1880s and 1890s the business was located at what was then 218–224 (in 1890, renumbered to 318–324) N. Los Angeles Street, immediately south of Mellus Row. This was the heart of the city's business district in the 1870s and 1880s. The store sold "everything from drugs to explosives." Food staples were sold by weight, in bulk. The store was one of seven names in the city's first phone directory. In the 1880s, Herman Baruch, who was married to Abraham Haas' niece, Jeanette Meertief, and his brother, Jacob Baruch, who was married to another niece, Jeanette Weiler, bought out Herman Hellman when Hellman took the position of manager of the Farmers and Merchants Bank, a bank which grew out of Hellman's being so trusted that early Angelenos entrusted their valuables to him for safekeeping.

In November 1889, the firm moved into much larger quarters one block south at what was then 118–124 N. Los Angeles Street, renumbered to 218–224 N. Los Angeles Street in 1890.

On February 17, 1890, Hellman left the partnership, which continued to operate under a new name, Haas, Baruch & Co., and by the turn of the 20th century the store was the growing city's most dominant wholesale grocery business.
