= Valley Plaza =

Shopping center in North Hollywood, Los Angeles

Coordinates: 34.1871795°N 118.3973922°W

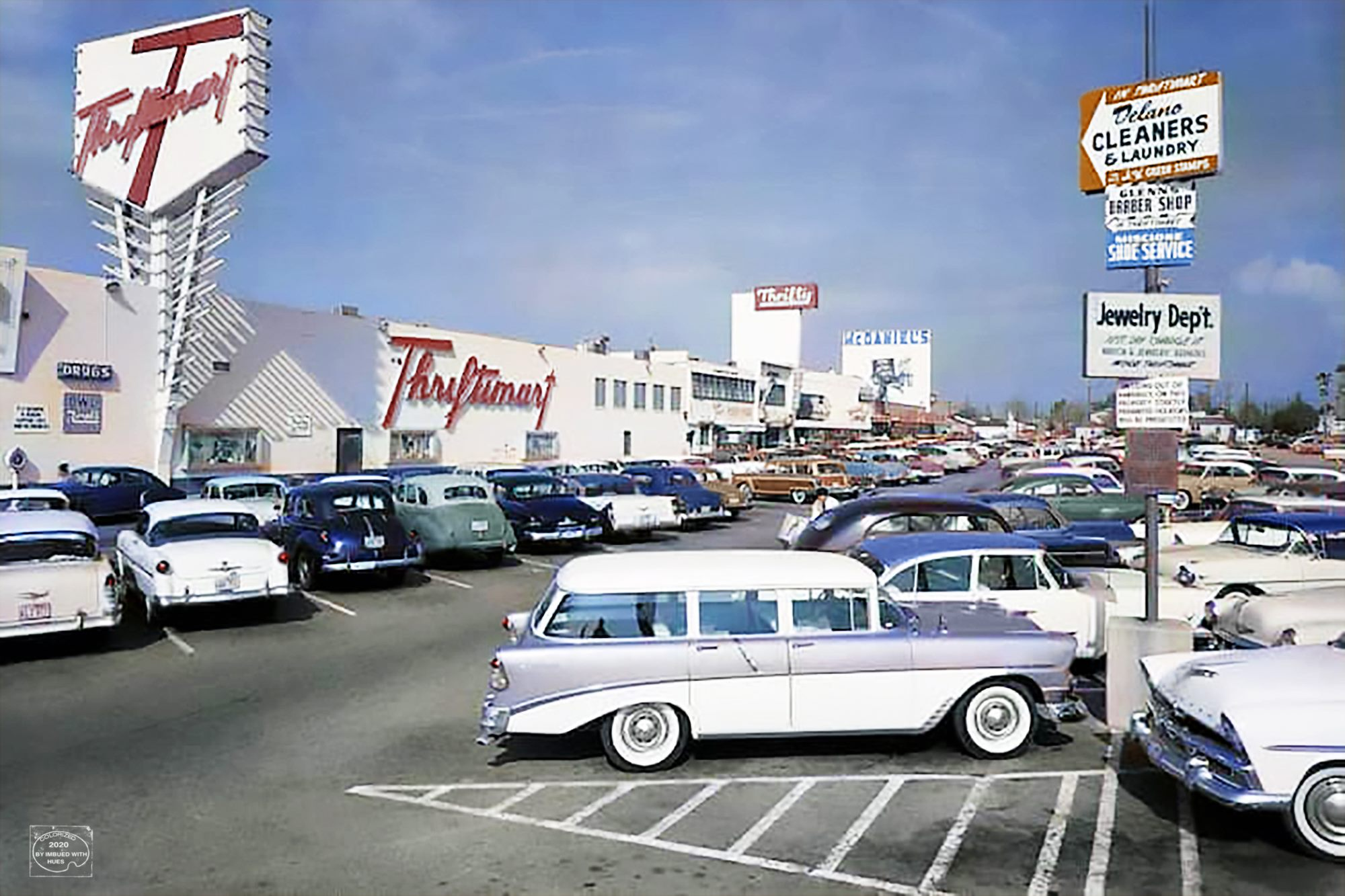
- Valley Plaza in the 1950s
- Location: North Hollywood, Los Angeles, California, United States
- Address: Laurel Canyon Boulevard and Victory Boulevard
- Opened: 1951
- Closed: October 29, 2025
- Demolished: October 29, 2025 (Demolition Completed On August 24th, 2026)
- Developer: Bob Symonds
- Owner: Multiple owners
- Floor area: More than 1,000,000 sq ft (93,000 m^{2}) at its peak
- Floors: 1
- Parking: Surface parking

Valley Plaza was a shopping center in North Hollywood, Los Angeles, one of the first in the San Fernando Valley, opened in 1951. In the mid-1950s, it was reported to be the largest shopping center on the West Coast of the United States and the third-largest in the country. It was located along Laurel Canyon Boulevard from Oxnard to Vanowen, and west along Victory Boulevard. Like its competitor, Panorama City Shopping Center to the north, Valley Plaza started with one core development and grew over time to market, under the single name "Valley Plaza", a collection of adjacent retail developments with multiple developers, owners, and opening dates.

== Opening ==
The idea to develop the plaza came from developer Bob Symonds in 1942, who had helped to create the Miracle Mile concentration of shops on Wilshire Boulevard. from started with a 210,000-square-foot (20,000 m^{2}) 2-story Sears store announced in 1948. The center was on a 50-acre lot, including 15 acres of parking. Urbanism analyst Richard Longstreth noted that Symonds was the first developer in Southern California to recognize the significance of the rapidly growing freeway system for the development of shopping centers, as they would attract large numbers of shoppers who would find it convenient to visit by car, avoiding problems with existing shopping areas, almost all of which required navigating streets choked with traffic, either in Downtown Los Angeles, Hollywood, or the central business districts of the surrounding towns, and which provided limited parking some distance from the stores.

The shopping center opened on August 12, 1951, with parking for 4000 cars, and had cost between $20,000,000 and $40,000,000 (depending on the source) to build.

Early anchors included (from north to south):

- McDaniels supermarket, 6657 Laurel Canyon Now Planet Fitness.
- Thrifty Drug Stores, 6639 Laurel Canyon
- A combined Mayfair-Big Owl/Rexall supermarket-and-drugstore, 6601 Laurel Canyon, 45,000 sq ft (4,200 m^{2}). Became Thriftimart in 1954.
- Bond's clothing stores, 6541 Laurel Canyon
- Woolworth's variety store, 6521 Laurel Canyon, opened June 16, 1955
- Sears, 12121 Victory at the northwest corner of Laurel Canyon. Opened September 12, 1951.
- Occidental Savings Bank, 12140 Victory. Opened on January 22, 1954, architect Stiles O. Clements, famous for the design of Streamline Moderne retail buildings on Miracle Mile, including Coulter's and Mullen & Bluett. 180,000 sq ft (17,000 m^{2}).
- Hartfield's, 6507 Laurel Canyon
- Alexander's Market (Glendale-based chain of 7 supermarkets), 6355 Bellingham, Stiles O. Clements, architect, opened April 3, 1952, from Feb. 1973, Pic 'N' Save, then UA theatres, then Regency Valley Plaza cinemas

== Expansion ==
Valley Plaza would later extend along Victory Boulevard to cover 100 acres (40 ha). By 1956 it was reported to cover 100 acres with 1,039,000 square feet of retail space, the third-largest in the nation at that time, after Cross County Shopping Center in Yonkers, New York and Northland Center in Greater Detroit. It was reported to have close to $100 million in annual sales. The Valley Plaza Merchants Associated counted the May Company department store at Oxnard St., as part of "Valley Plaza", but later, in 1968, May would build an enclosed mall, Laurel Plaza, attached to their store, thus forming a separate identity from Valley Plaza. The May Co. being very large, 452,000 square feet (42,000 m^{2}), Valley Plaza was reported to have the second-largest suburban branch department store in the country, outsized only by a branch of Hudson's in suburban Detroit.

On February 5, 1959, a third major department store anchor, a 100,000 sq ft (9,300 m^{2}), two-level J. C. Penney opened on the north side of Victory Blvd. just west of Sears and just east of the Hollywood Freeway. A Goodyear tire store also opened around this time.

It was also around this time that the Hollywood Freeway was extended north to Magnolia Boulevard and the Ventura Freeway was completed nearby, greatly increasing the accessibility of the center.

In 1960 the Los Angeles Federal Savings and Loan Tower, now known as the Valley Plaza Tower, was completed. The building is now occupied by Wells Fargo Bank. It was upon opening, the tallest building in the San Fernando Valley. Architects were Douglas Honnold and John Rex and the style is "Corporate International". It was one of the first skyscrapers built in Los Angeles after the 1957 repeal of a 150-foot height limit ordinance. Murals have covered the entire height and width of the tower's western side over the decades. Today it portrays the history of Los Angeles; previous subjects were the 1976 United States Bicentennial, the 1984 Summer Olympics held in Los Angeles, and former football team of the city, the Los Angeles Raiders.

== Decline ==
Reasons for the decline of Valley Plaza included:

- The area became progressively lower in income, as working-class Hispanics replaced middle- and upper-middle class Whites as the suburbs expanded ever westward and northward. However, this allowed lower-end retail, such as the 99 Cent Only store and Smart & Final Extra!, to thrive in places like North Hollywood.
- Competition - Valley Plaza competed with the large Panorama City Shopping Center from the same era, and from the 1960s onward, numerous other malls were built in the Valley such as Sherman Oaks Fashion Square. Later, the renovated Burbank Town Center and power centers, like Burbank Empire Center and The Plant in Panorama City, would compete.
- Multiple owners - by 1999 the area marketed as Valley Plaza had dozens of owners, making it more difficult to formulate a strategy and react to the market
- Other factors such as effects of the 1994 Northridge earthquake, perception of crime, and more.

From the original development on the west side of Laurel Canyon Boulevard, the current status is as follows:

- from Archwood south to Kittridge: site of McDaniels Market (6657 Laurel Canyon) is now a Planet Fitness, block is also home to 99 Cents Only Stores (now a Dollar Tree) and Smart & Final Extra!
- from Kittridge south to Hamlin (original site of Mayfair-Rexall et al.) - now occupied by Roy Romer Middle School and ISANA Palmati Academy charter school
- from Hamlin south to Victory - the former Sears store, closed in 2019, is now home to a Burlington, Ross Dress for Less, and Target. The strip of shops behind (west of) Sears, is mostly occupied.
- from Victory south to Sylvan - mostly abandoned storefronts
- from Sylvan south to Erwin - an operating Gold's Gym and various abandoned storefronts along Laurel Canyon and around the parking lot at the back

Along Victory Boulevard west of Laurel Canyon, the Penney's building at 12215 Victory is used by West Coast University as a campus. The Regal Cinemas closed as of December 2021. The McMahan's Furniture store at 12126 Victory Blvd. is now a DaVita dialysis center.

Further south along Laurel Canyon (Laurel Plaza and the May Co.), after the 1994 Northridge earthquake, the Laurel Plaza mall was closed due to damage but the department store May Co. remained open. It became a Robinsons-May in 1993, then Macy’s in 2006 which operated until 2016, after the property was sold for redevelopment, and is now a mixed-use development called NOHO West, home to Trader Joe's, L.A. Fitness, and Regal Cinemas, amongst others.

Following the earthquake, the renovation of the Valley Plaza and Laurel Plaza area became a project overseen by the Community Redevelopment Agency of the City of Los Angeles. Shortly after 2000, J. H. Snyder acquired the core Valley Plaza property from lender iStar, and announced plans for a $300 million renovation. Over the next 10 years, leases were not renewed and tenants were evicted, resulting in a mostly abandoned property. However Snyder was not able to follow through on the plans and sold it back to iStar in 2011. As of mid-2020, only the former May Co./Laurel Plaza site is under construction as NoHo West, a mixed-use development including retail.

On August 19, 2025, the Los Angeles Department of Building and Safety Commissioners voted to declare the six blighted buildings a public nuisance, allowing for their demolition. It is unknown what will be replacing the former shopping center.

On October 29th, 2025 demolition of the plaza began.

== Key tenants ==
=== Laurel Canyon Boulevard ===
Original business	Currently	Location	↑ N L A U R E L C A N Y O N S ↓			
←W Archwood			↑ N L A U R E L C A N Y O N S ↓			
McDaniels Market Ralphs	Planet Fitness	6657	↑ N L A U R E L C A N Y O N S ↓			
Thrifty Drug Stores 99 Cents Only Stores	Dollar Tree	6639	↑ N L A U R E L C A N Y O N S ↓			
Big Owl(1951); Thriftimart (1954)	Smart & Final Extra!	6601	↑ N L A U R E L C A N Y O N S ↓			
←W Kittridge			↑ N L A U R E L C A N Y O N S ↓			
Wetherby Kaiser Shoes (1955)	Roy Romer Middle School, ISANA Palmati Academy	6543	↑ N L A U R E L C A N Y O N S ↓			
Bond's	Roy Romer Middle School, ISANA Palmati Academy	6541	↑ N L A U R E L C A N Y O N S ↓			
Woolworth's	Roy Romer Middle School, ISANA Palmati Academy	6521	↑ N L A U R E L C A N Y O N S ↓			
Leeds shoes	Roy Romer Middle School, ISANA Palmati Academy	6513	↑ N L A U R E L C A N Y O N S ↓			
Hartfield's	Roy Romer Middle School, ISANA Palmati Academy	6507	↑ N L A U R E L C A N Y O N S ↓			
←W Hamlin			↑ N L A U R E L C A N Y O N S ↓			
Sears (closed 2019)	Burlington; Ross Dress for Less, Target	(northwest corner); 12121	↑ N L A U R E L C A N Y O N S ↓			
←W VICTORY BLVD.			↑ N L A U R E L C A N Y O N S ↓	VICTORY BLVD. →E		
Sizzler	IHOP	6343	↑ N L A U R E L C A N Y O N S ↓			
←W Sylvan			↑ N L A U R E L C A N Y O N S ↓	Sylvan →E		
Golds Gym	EōS Fitness	6233	↑ N L A U R E L C A N Y O N S ↓	6260		RE/MAX realtors
←W Erwin			↑ N L A U R E L C A N Y O N S ↓	Erwin →E		
			↑ N L A U R E L C A N Y O N S ↓	6150	May Company; Laurel Plaza	NOHO West: Regal Cinemas; Nordstrom Rack; Trader Joe's; L.A. Fitness

=== Victory Boulevard ===
Original business	Currently	Number	↑ W V I C T O R Y E ↓	Number	Orig. bus.	Currently
←S Bellingham			↑ W V I C T O R Y E ↓	Bellingham N→		
Alexander's; Pic 'N' Save (1973)	Regal Cinemas (closed by Dec. 2021)	6355; Bellingham	↑ W V I C T O R Y E ↓			
McMahan's Furniture	DaVita dialysis center	12126	↑ W V I C T O R Y E ↓	12215	J. C. Penney (opened 1959)	West Coast University
		(southwest corner)	↑ W V I C T O R Y E ↓	12121 (northwest corner)	Sears (closed 2019)	Burlington; Ross Dress for Less; Target
←S LAUREL			↑ W V I C T O R Y E ↓	CANYON N→		

== Movies filmed here ==
Valley Plaza served as a filming location for:

- Magnolia (1999)
- Pineapple Express (2008)
- Don Jon (2013)
- Nightcrawler (2014)
- Straight Outta Compton (2015)
- Captain Marvel (2019)

TV shows

- Too Old to Die Young, “Volume 1: The Devil” (2019)
- Dragnet, episode “The Bank Jobs” (1968)
- Aquarius, “A Change Is Gonna Come” (2015)
- The Assassination of Gianni Versace: American Crime Story (2018)
- Sneaky Pete, “The California Split” (2019)
- The Middle, “Hecks at a Movie” (2016)
- Fallout (2025-2026)

Music videos

- Randy Newman, “I Love L.A.” (1983)
