= Cash and carry (disambiguation) =

Cash and carry is a type of sales operation within the wholesale sector

Cash and carry may also refer to:

- Cash and Carry (game show), the first network-televised game show
- Cash and carry (World War II), a revision of the Neutrality Acts, designed to aid the British
- Cash and Carry (film), a 1937 Three Stooges short film
- Cash&Carry Smart Foodservice, the United States grocery chain
- Kash n' Karry, the United States supermarket chain
- "Cash and Carry", an episode of Softly, Softly: Task Force
