= NoHo West =

Mixed-use complex in Los Angeles

NOHO West
Project
- Status: in progress
- Developer: Merlone Geier Partners
- Website: nohowest.com

Location
- Interactive map of NoHo West
- Coordinates: 34°10′52″N 118°23′40″W
- Country: United States
- State: California
- City: Los Angeles
- Neighborhood: North Hollywood
- Address: 6150 Laurel Canyon Boulevard, North Hollywood, CA 91606

Area
  - Total: 25 acres (10 ha)

NOHO West is a mixed-use complex in North Hollywood, Los Angeles. Developed on the 25-acre site (10 ha) of the former Laurel Plaza regional shopping mall, the development includes residential units, commercial offices and pedestrian-oriented shops and restaurants. Groundbreaking for NOHO West began in April 2017. The development was planned to be completed in phases. The Macy's department store was converted into 500,000 square feet (46,000 m^{2}) of office space. Major retail tenants that were announced prior to opening included 24 Hour Fitness, Regal Cinemas, Old Navy, and Trader Joe's.

The first units in the residential section became available in December 2021 with the final units are expected to become available by April 2023.

In the commercial retail section of the development, Trader Joe's had their grand opening in June 2020. while the Regal North Hollywood & 4DX theatre had their grand opening in May 2021.

== Laurel Plaza ==
Laurel Plaza was a 600,000-square-foot regional shopping mall (56,000 m^{2}) that opened in 1968. May Company California was the department store anchor and it had 30 specialty and high fashion shops, an ice skating rink, restaurants, snack facilities and a central mall. Prior to the opening of the Laurel Plaza mall, May Co. marketed itself as part of Valley Plaza, a catch-all name for diverse shopping areas along the major transit corridors of Laurel Canyon Boulevard and Victory Boulevard.

After the 1994 Northridge earthquake, the mall was closed due to damage but the department store May Co. remained open. It became a Robinsons-May in 1993, later Macy's in 2006 which operated until 2016, after the property was sold for redevelopment.
