= Bernard Cohen =

Bernard Cohen may refer to:

- Bernard Cohen (physicist) (1924–2012), American physicist at the University of Pittsburgh
- I. Bernard Cohen (1914–2003), American professor of the history of science at Harvard University
- Bernard Cohen (painter) (born 1933), British artist
- Bernard Cohen (Australian author) (born 1963), Australian writer
- Bernard Cecil Cohen (1926–2024), American academic administrator, chancellor of University of Wisconsin, Madison
- Bernard S. Cohen (1934–2020), American politician and member of the Virginia House of Delegates

== See also ==
- Bernard Cohn (disambiguation)
