= Smart & Final =

Chain of warehouse-style food and supply stores

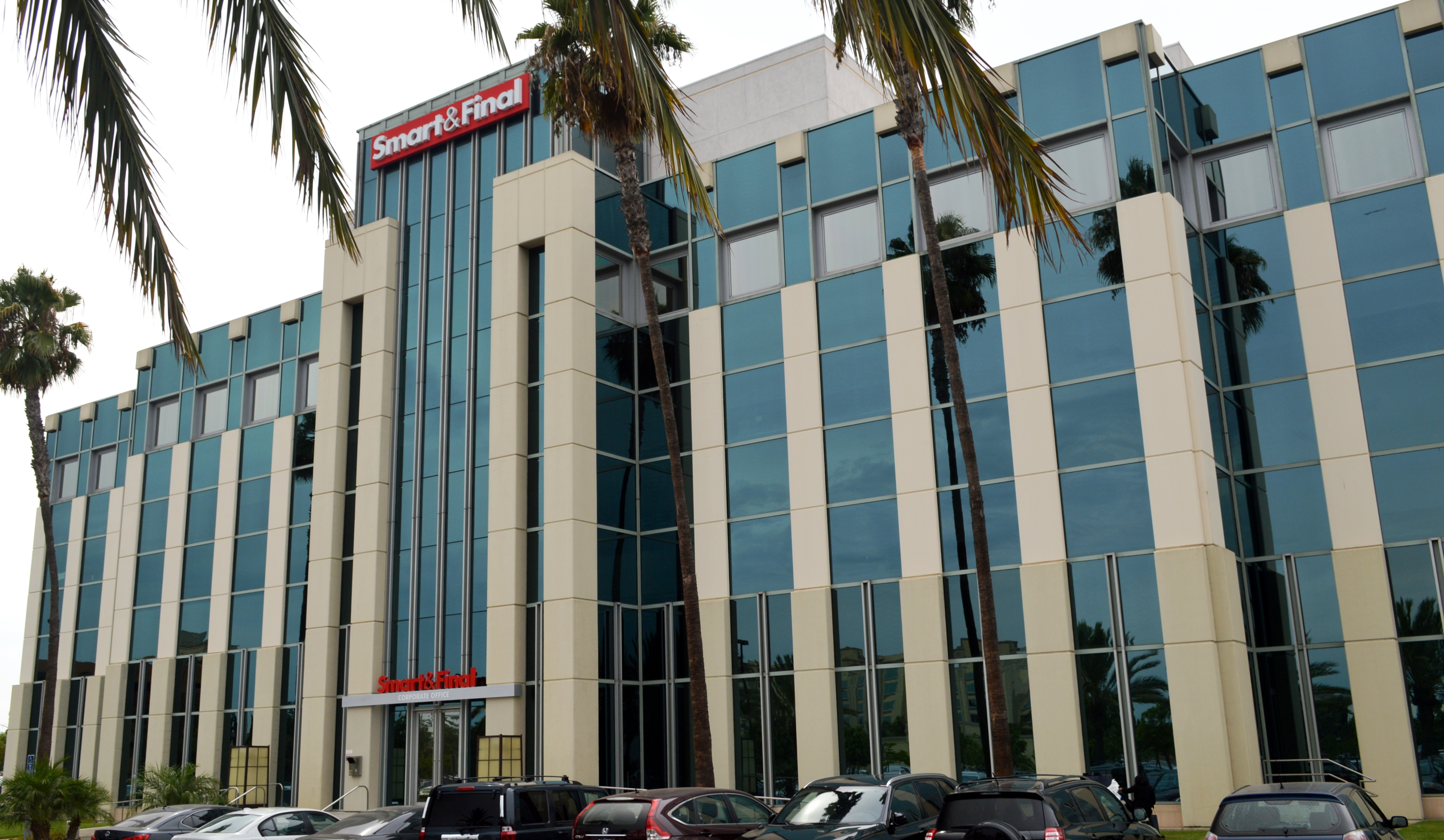
- Smart & Final headquarters in Commerce, California.
- Formerly: Santa Ana Grocery Company (1912–1914)
- Type: Private
- Industry: Grocery store
- Predecessors: Hellman, Haas & Co.; (1871–1889); Haas, Baruch & Co.; (1889–1953)
- Founded: 1871; 155 years ago
- Founders: J.S. "Jim" Smart; H.D. "Hildane" Final
- Headquarters: Commerce, California, United States
- Number of locations: 253 (2022)
- Area served: California, Arizona, Nevada and northern Mexico
- Products: Food
- Revenue: ▲US$3.1 billion (2022)
- Owner: Chedraui USA
- Number of employees: 11,000
- Website: smartandfinal.com

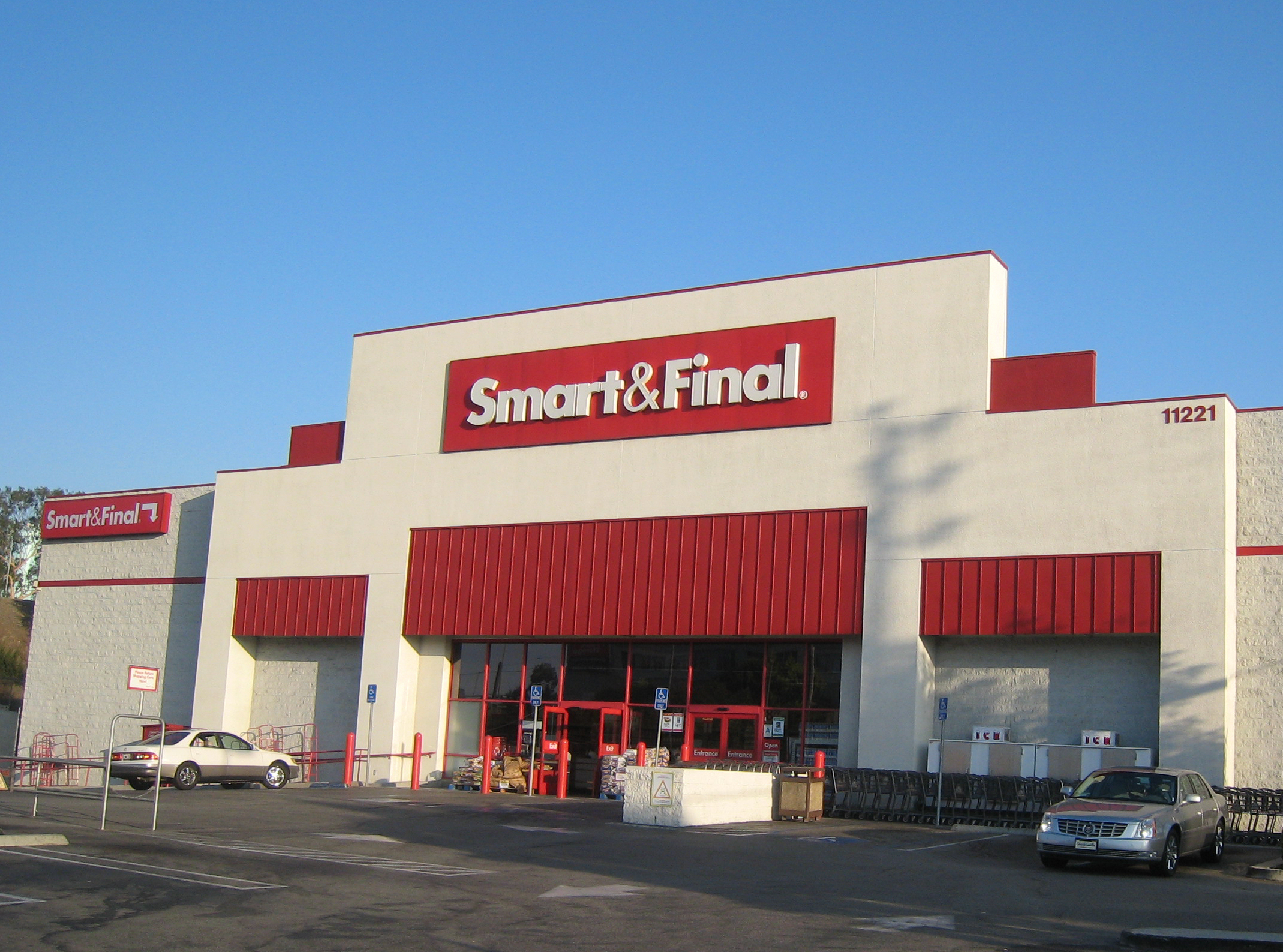
Smart & Final store in West Los Angeles, California

Smart & Final is a chain of warehouse-style food and supply stores based in Commerce, California, which developed through a series of mergers and expansions. The oldest of the combined companies, Hellman, Haas & Co., was founded in 1871 in Los Angeles. The company operates over 250 stores in the Western United States and 15 in northwestern Mexico.

While Smart & Final stores target both the food-service and household markets, the company also formerly operated Smart Foodservice Warehouse Stores (formerly known as Cash & Carry), which market to food service professionals.

The stores in Mexico are operated under a joint venture with Calimax. Since 2008, Smart & Final Extra! operates in some parts of the United States. These stores contain a slightly larger footprint and larger assortment of goods.

== History ==
According to company information, Smart & Final traces its beginnings to 1871, when partners Herman W. Hellman, Jacob Haas (who later became Mayor of Los Angeles), and Bernard Cohn started Hellman-Haas Grocery Company on then-rural Los Angeles Street. By 1900 the company had changed its name to Haas, Baruch & Co., which decades later would be merged into what had become Smart & Final.

A separate company, Santa Ana Grocery Company, formed in 1912, mainly supplying feed and grain to local farmers. J. S. "Jim" Smart, a banker from Saginaw, Michigan, and H. D. "Hildane" Final bought the company in 1914 and changed the name to Smart & Final Wholesale Grocers. From 1876 to 1913, Jim Smart had been involved with several wholesale grocers in the greater Saginaw area, including Lee, Cady & Smart and Smart & Symons with his brother-in-law, J. W. Symons of Symons Brothers.

By 1919, annual sales for Smart & Final had reached $10 million. During the fierce competition among expanding grocers in the 1920s, the company introduced a self-serve concept to replace reliance on clerks to fetch goods. This was called "cash and carry."

In 1953, Smart & Final merged with Haas, Baruch & Co.

=== Casino Guichard-Perrachon S.A. era (1984–2007) ===
In 1984, it was acquired by Thriftimart. In June 1984, Casino USA Inc., the U.S. arm of the French supermarket retailer Casino Guichard-Perrachon & Cie acquired the 8.3% of Thriftimart, which controls Smart & Final stores.

In September 1984, Smart & Final Iris, formerly Thriftimart, Inc. was acquired by Casino Guichard-Perrachon. The French retailer then began a dynamic expansion and modernization of Smart & Final stores.

In 1991, it was reorganized via a corporate spin-off and initial public offering. Casino USA still owns about 53% of Smart & Final.

In 1992, it announced a joint venture with Calimax to open stores in Mexico.

In 1994, it opened its first store in Mexico.

In 1998, it acquired Portland, Oregon-based United Grocers Cash & Carry, which was renamed Cash & Carry. These stores are concentrated in the Pacific Northwest.

In 2007, Smart & Final acquired 35 Henry's Farmers Markets in California and Sun Harvest Markets in Texas for about $166 million. In February 2007, the French supermarket retailer Casino Guichard-Perrachon S.A. announced its intention to sell Smart & Final.

=== Apollo Global Management, first era (2007–2012) ===
In 2007, the company was acquired by Apollo Global Management.

In March 2010, Smart & Final announced it would expand into the Colorado market under the SmartCo Foods brand, taking over five former Albertsons locations in the Denver metro area with plans for dozens more stores in the coming years. SmartCo stores differed from typical Smart & Final locations in that they were significantly larger and included produce, meat, and bakery departments, as well as a large selection of natural and organic foods. In June 2010, the first SmartCo Foods store opened on Parker Road in Denver, and was said to be tailored for the Colorado market.

In November 2010, only five months after the chain's grand opening, SmartCo Foods announced that it was exiting the Denver market and closing all five of its stores. SmartCo Foods attributed its hasty exit from Denver to poor performance chain-wide without any hope for improvement. However, the withdrawal may have also been partially due to negotiations resulting in the February 2011 acquisition of the Sprouts Farmers Market which had 9 locations in Colorado.

=== Ares Management era (2012–2019) ===
In 2012, Apollo sold its stake in Smart & Final to Ares Management for $975 million. Smart & Final went public in 2014.

In 2015, Smart & Final purchased the leases on 32 locations previously operated by Haggen.

=== Apollo Global Management, second era (2019–2021) ===
In 2019, Apollo once again acquired the chain, for $1.1 billion. Deutsche Bank had financed the previous buyout and took a loss.

On October 30, 2019, Smart & Final introduced two redesigned online shopping portals for consumers and business clients. Shoppers can see weekly specials, create grocery lists, shop by recipes, and create profiles that reflect dietary allergies or preferences. Business clients can complete online orders and apply for tax exemptions.

=== Chedraui era (2021–) ===
On May 24, 2021, Mexican supermarket operator Chedraui (via its California-based Bodega Latina subsidiary) announced its intent to acquire Smart & Final from Apollo. Subsequently, Bodega Latina changed its name to Chedraui USA.

== Brands ==
Smart & Final sells products under three of its own brands:

- First Street branded items are primarily grocery products.
- Sun Harvest includes natural and organic items.
- Simply Value is a brand used for household products.
