= Frederick A. MacDougall =

American politician

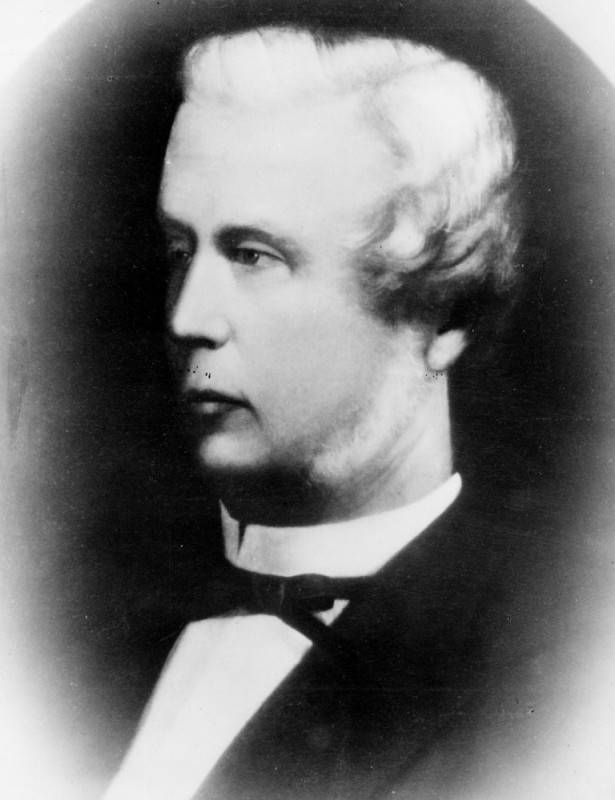
- MacDougall in 1863

14th Mayor of Los Angeles
- In office December 8, 1876 – November 16, 1878
- Preceded by: Prudent Beaudry
- Succeeded by: Bernard Cohn

Personal details
- Born: Frederick Alexander MacDougall; November 2, 1818 Scotland
- Died: November 16, 1878 (aged 60) Los Angeles, California, US

Frederick Alexander MacDougall (November 2, 1818 – November 16, 1878) was the 14th Mayor of Los Angeles, from 1876 to 1878. He was a physician and the first Los Angeles Chief of Police. He died in 1878 in office and Bernard Cohn was appointed to be mayor for only 2 weeks.
