= Thriftimart =

American supermarket chain

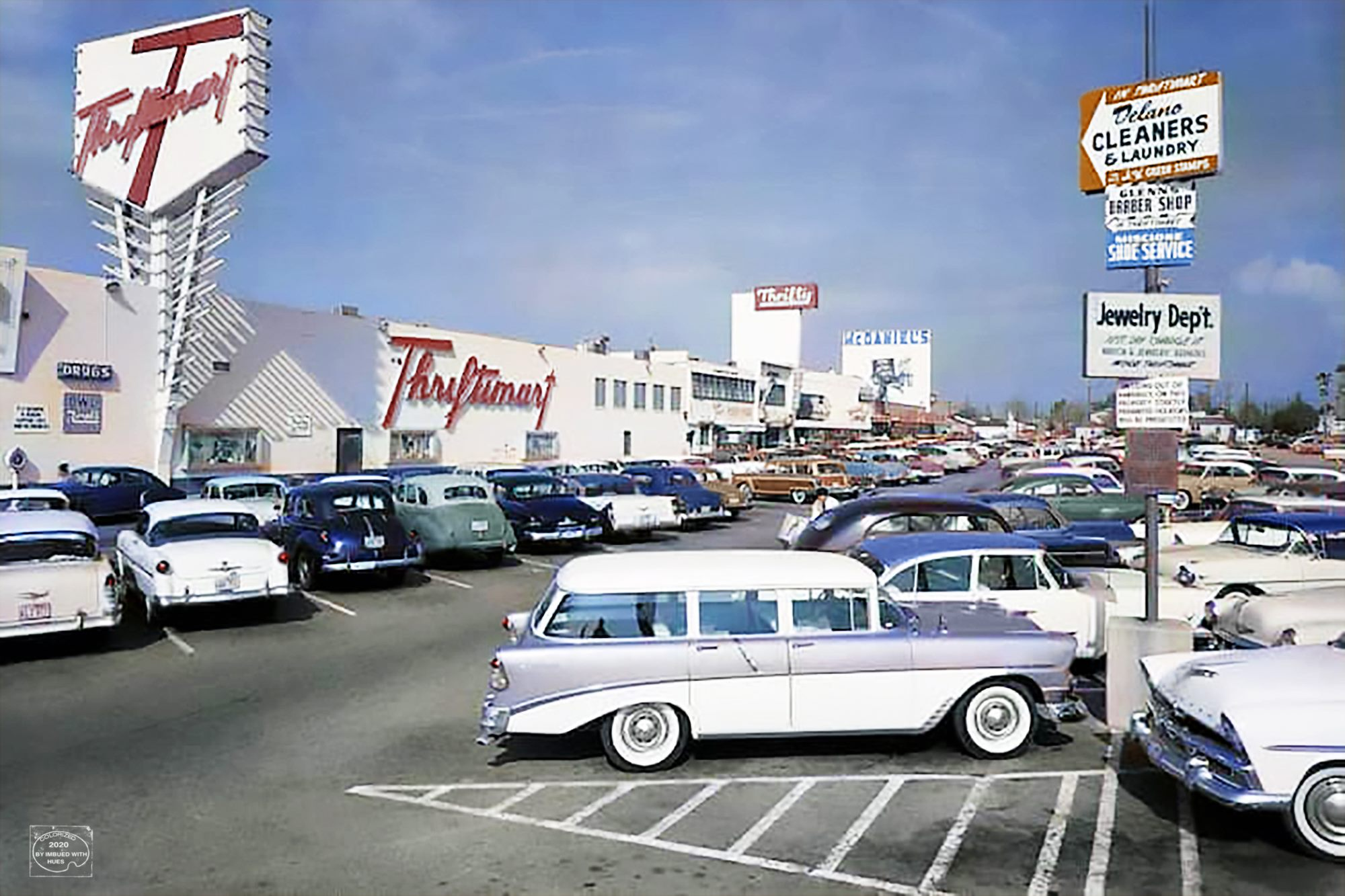
View of one part of Valley Plaza, North Hollywood; At left: Owl Drugs' Big Owl market opened in 1951, and was sold and rebranded ThrifTimart in 1954

ThrifTimart was an American chain of supermarkets in Greater Los Angeles until 1984, founded by Roger M. Laverty. Many stores continue to operate as Smart & Final stores, now owned by Mexico City-based Chedraui.

== History ==
Corporate history
Year	Corporate name	Chains operated
1930	Fitzsimmons Stores, Ltd.	Fitzsimmons; Thriftimart
194x	Fitzsimmons Stores, Ltd.	Fitzsimmons; Thriftimart; Roberts
1955	Fitzsimmons Stores, Ltd.	Fitzsimmons (–1950s); Thriftimart (–1984); Roberts (–1960s); Smart & Final Iris
1957	Thriftimart, Inc.	Fitzsimmons (–1950s); Thriftimart (–1984); Roberts (–1960s); Smart & Final Iris
1984	Smart & Final Iris Co. Part of Casino USA Inc.	Smart & Final Iris

=== As Fitzsimmons Markets, Ltd. (1930-1957) ===
Roger Montgomery Laverty was born in 1890 in Pittsburgh, Pennsylvania. In 1930, Laverty was vice president of the Central Division of the A&P, the largest U.S. grocery chain at the time. He and a group of colleagues bought Fitzsimmons Stores, Ltd., a small Los Angeles chain of markets. In 1939, Fitzsimmons acquired 9 Thriftimart stores, then in 1947, Laverty bought Thriftimart Inc. and the combined company kept the Fitzsimmons Stores, Ltd. name. In 1948, sales at Fitzsimmons Stores Ltd. amounted to $19,931,475.

In 1949, Fitzsimmons Stores Ltd. acquired Fred Roberts & Co. which operated Roberts Markets, a 19-store Los Angeles-based chain, as well as 15 liquor stores. Roberts' 1948 sales were $18,889,948, just under Fitzsimmons' numbers for that year.

Geographic presence of Roberts Public Markets in 1949
Central L.A. (2): 440 Atlantic Boulevard, East L.A.; 4030 Eagle Rock Boulevard, Glassell Park; San Fernando Valley (1): 14532 Ventura Boulevard, Sherman Oaks; Southeast Los Angeles County (1): 9609 Long Beach Boulevard, South Gate	Westside (10) Venice: #1 1338 Washington Boulevard; #4 2570 Lincoln Boulevard; #23 325 Line (Lincoln) Boulevard (Clark's Ranch); West L.A.: #5 10666 Pico Boulevard; #16 11526 Santa Monica Boulevard; #11 11841 Wilshire Boulevard; #28 12210 Santa Monica Boulevard	Westside (cont'd) Santa Monica: #10 420 Broadway; #13 1505 Wilshire Boulevard; Culver City: #29 10113 Venice Boulevard	South Bay (4): 3140 Imperial Highway, Inglewood; 468 Market Street, Inglewood; 49 Pier Avenue, Hermosa Beach; 310 Torrance Boulevard, Redondo beach; Long Beach (1): 1830 Artesia Boulevard, North Long Beach

Geographic presence of Fitzsimmons Stores, Ltd. markets in 1952
T=Thriftimart, R=Roberts, F=Fitzsimmons, FL=Foodland RR=Roberts Ranch, CR=Clark's Ranch, B=Bill's
Central L.A. & adj. (5): Baldwin Hills/Crenshaw 1T; Glassell Park 1R 1F; University Park 1T; East Los Angeles 1RR; Hollywood/Mid-Wilshire (6): Hollywood 2T; West Hollywood 1T; Silverlake 1T; Leimert Park 1T; Echo Park 1T	Westside (14): Venice 2R 1CR; West Los Angeles 1T 1R; Santa Monica 1T 1R; Beverly Hills 2T; Westdale 1T; Westchester 1T; Palms 1T; Ladera 1T; Brentwood 1T	San Fernando Valley (14): Glendale 6T; Burbank 1T 1FL 1B; Van Nuys 2T; Valley Village 1T; Studio City 1T; North Hollywood 1F	South Bay (3): Inglewood 1T; Hermosa Beach 1R; Compton 1T; Long Beach (4): Los Altos South 1T; Lakewood Village 1T; Grant 1 RR; Franklin 1T; Southeast Los Angeles County (2): South Gate 1R; Bellflower 1T

In 1954, Fitzsimmons acquired the large, 44,000 sq ft (4,100 m^{2}) Big Owl supermarket at Valley Plaza in North Hollywood, which was rebranded Thriftimart. Big Owl had been a project of the Owl Drug Company, which stated that it had completed extensive research on shoppers' in-store behavior, the results of which it used to create a "revolutionary" store layout for Big Owl that would shorten the amount of walking required to complete a typical shopping trip. With the aim of providing the convenience of one-stop shopping, Big Owl also incorporated stores-in-store, which was uncommon at the time, including Van de Kamp's Bakeries, See's Candies, a "soda grill" for quick meals and snacks, a barber, cleaners, watch repair, and sales of china and gift items. It had 12 checkout lanes with electric cash registers, where shoppers could pay for good from all the departments (a relatively recent innovation in markets at the time), 9 entrances for the public, and its parking lot had space for 750 cars. Through a window, customers could watch meat be packed in cellophane, weighed, labeled and marked with a price, then watch a "tremendous, store-long" conveyor belt transport it to refrigerated cases in the store's meat sales area. Big Owl stated that its neon sign was the brightest in the U.S. west of Chicago.

Fitzsimmons Stores, Ltd. bought the "Smart & Final Iris" company and its cash-and-carry (wholesale) stores in 1955.

=== As Thriftimart, Inc. (1957–1984) ===
In 1957, Fitzsimmons Stores Ltd. had changed its name to Thriftimart, Inc., saying that Thriftimart had "come to mean leadership in the grocery field" and that it was for that reason most appropriate that the firm bear the Thriftimart name. At the time there were 43 Thriftimart-branded stores in addition to Fitzsimmons-branded stores.

As Greater Los Angeles grew, so did Thriftimart, Inc. There were 50 Thriftimart retail grocery stores in May 1960: 44 in Los Angeles County (including 1 in Lancaster), plus 1 in Riverside, 1 in San Bernardino County (Colton), 2 in Bakersfield and 2 in Las Vegas. This grew to 56 (and 3,000 employees) by October 1960 and 77 by 1971, and 79 (plus 86 cash-and-carry and 5 warehouses) in 1976.

In 1968, son Robert Edward Laverty became president and chairman of the board.

Thriftimart opened its last new store in 1971. By 1983, the by then 43-store Thriftimart chain determined that it could not adapt to the trend towards larger supermarkets. Its stores measured on average 30,000 sq ft (2,800 m^{2}) while others' averaged 45,000 sq ft (4,200 m^{2}). Thriftimart stated that it had looked for a buyer, but of the major local chains — Boys, Hughes, Lucky, Ralphs, Safeway, and Vons — none was interested.

=== As Smart & Final Iris Co. (1984–) ===
In 1984, Thriftimart, Inc. changed its name to Smart & Final Iris Co. In June of that year, Casino USA Inc. acquired the 8.3% stake in the Class A shares of Thriftimart Inc. owned by movie theater executives Michael Forman and James Cotter.

On March 1, 1984, Thriftimart announced that it would sell 23 of its then 40 stores to Oakland-based Safeway Stores, Inc. which operated about 2,500 supermarkets but had relatively weak coverage in Los Angeles and Orange Counties, ranking #5 in 1983, trailing Ralphs, Vons, Lucky and Alpha Beta. 17 Thriftimart stores remained.

In September of that year, Casino gained control of Smart & Final Iris (i.e. the former Thriftimart, Inc.) by acquiring the combined 87% of the company's Class B stock owned by the founder's children Roger Laverty II, Robert Laverty, and Nancy Harris for $75 million. Class B shareholders controlled 5 of the company's 9 board seats.
