= Heilig-Meyers =

American furniture store chain

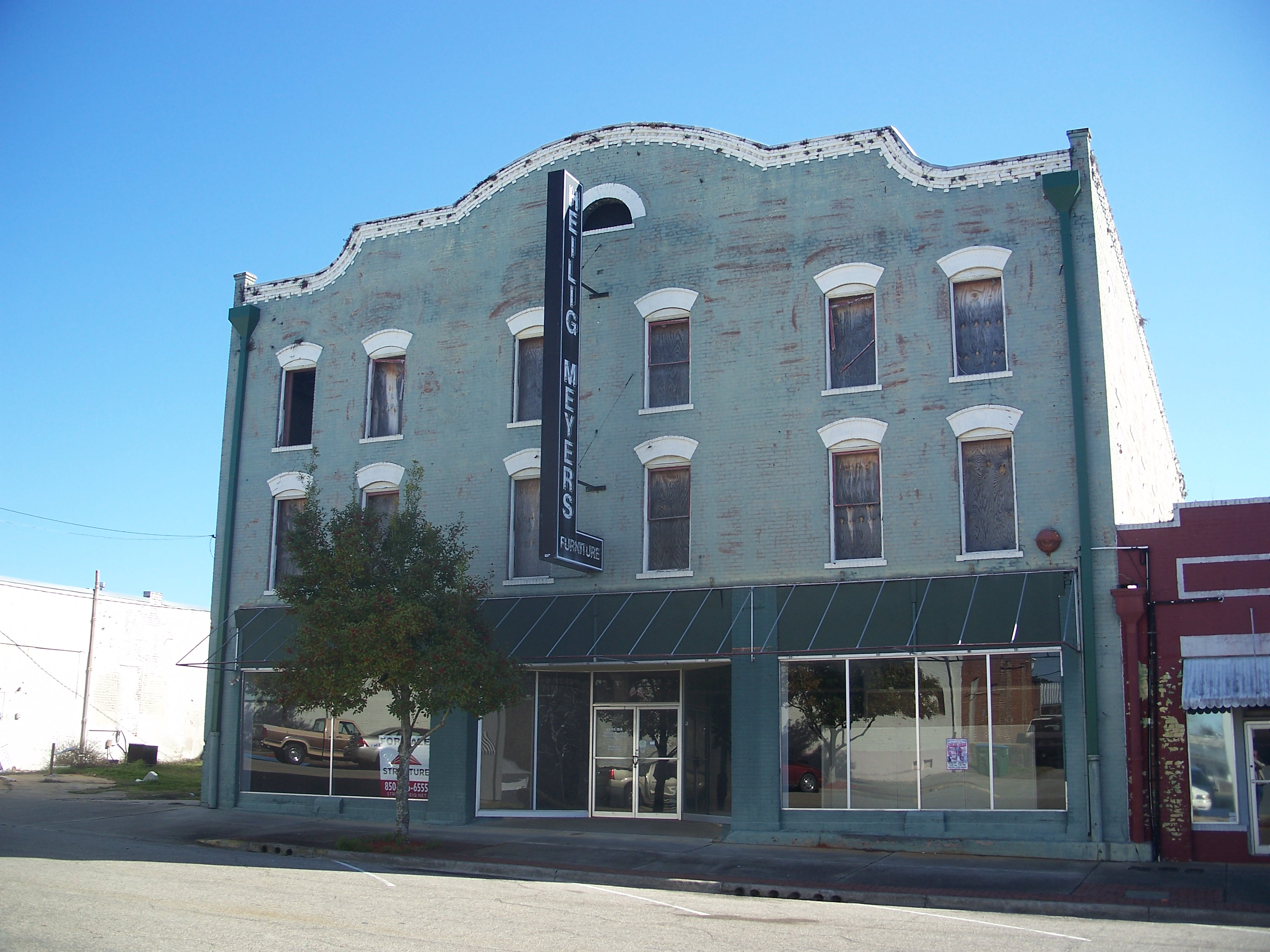
- Old Heilig-Meyers store in Quincy, Florida
- Type: Private
- Industry: Retail
- Founded: 1913
- Defunct: 2001 (emerged from bankruptcy as RoomStore in 2005)
- Fate: Chapter 11 bankruptcy
- Headquarters: Richmond, Virginia
- Products: Furniture, bedding, small appliances, consumer electronics, jewelry, and seasonal goods.

Heilig-Meyers was a retail furniture store chain founded in Goldsboro, North Carolina, in 1913 by two Lithuanian immigrants, W. A. Heilig and J. M. Meyers. Its corporate headquarters was in Richmond, Virginia. The chain grew to become the largest furniture retailer in the United States in the 1990s, ultimately having over 1,000 stores nationwide (including Puerto Rico).

Its over-expansion—by purchasing over 100 McMahan's Furniture stores based in Carlsbad, California, in 1993, as well as other stores and chains in the West—contributed to its failure. The company also bought the L. Fish furniture chain in the Chicago area; those stores were closed in 1999.

Heilig-Meyers filed for Chapter 11 bankruptcy on August 17, 2000, and subsequently announced the liquidation of its inventory, with all of their stores closing by mid-2001. The Richmond Times-Dispatch reported in 2000 that the company failed when its large expansion did not succeed in creating sufficient revenue and when customers who had previously used the company's in-house credit began using credit cards instead. The company's credit customers had grown increasingly weary of lower quality. All of its stores were closed at the end of the year, except for its RoomStore-branded locations, which remained open. In 2005, RoomStore, the only part of Heilig-Meyers remaining, emerged from Chapter 11 bankruptcy after receiving $35,000,000 (~$53.9 million in 2024) to pay off its debts; RoomStore would be liquidated seven years later.

The company, which had sponsored NASCAR Winston Cup drivers Bobby Hillin Jr., Dick Trickle and Mike Wallace, was one of the last furniture companies to finance its own accounts. The last CEO/President was Bill DeRusha.

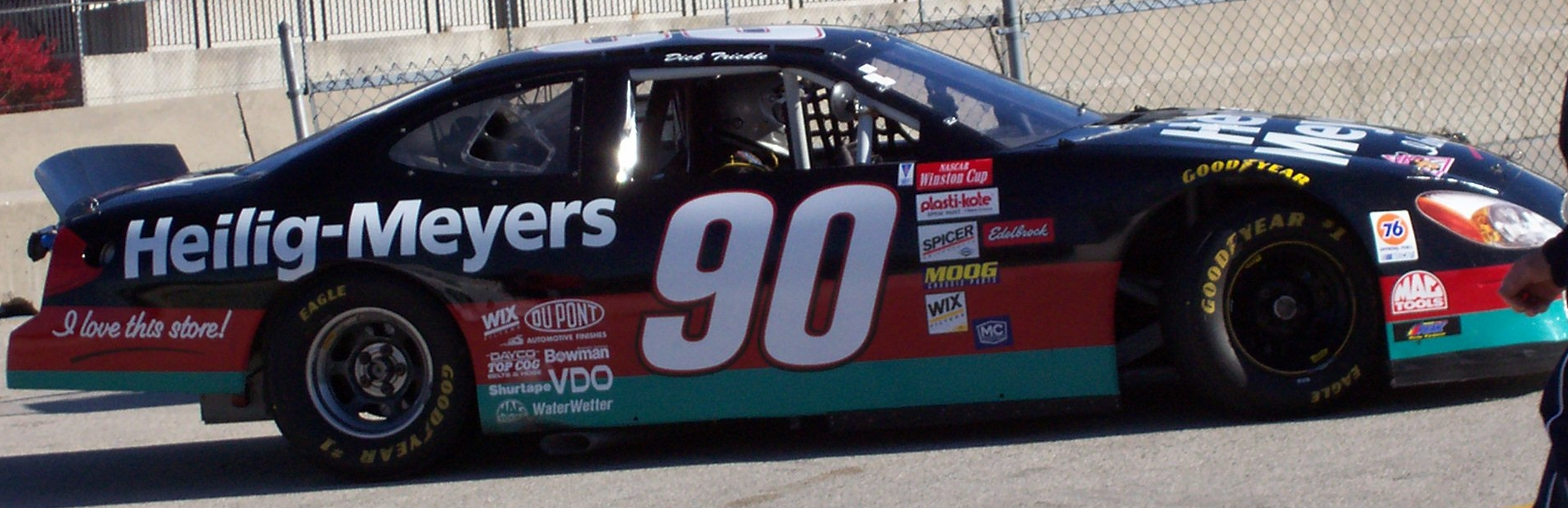
Heilig-Meyers Winston Cup car
