= Owl Drug =

American drugstore retailer

Owl Drug’s
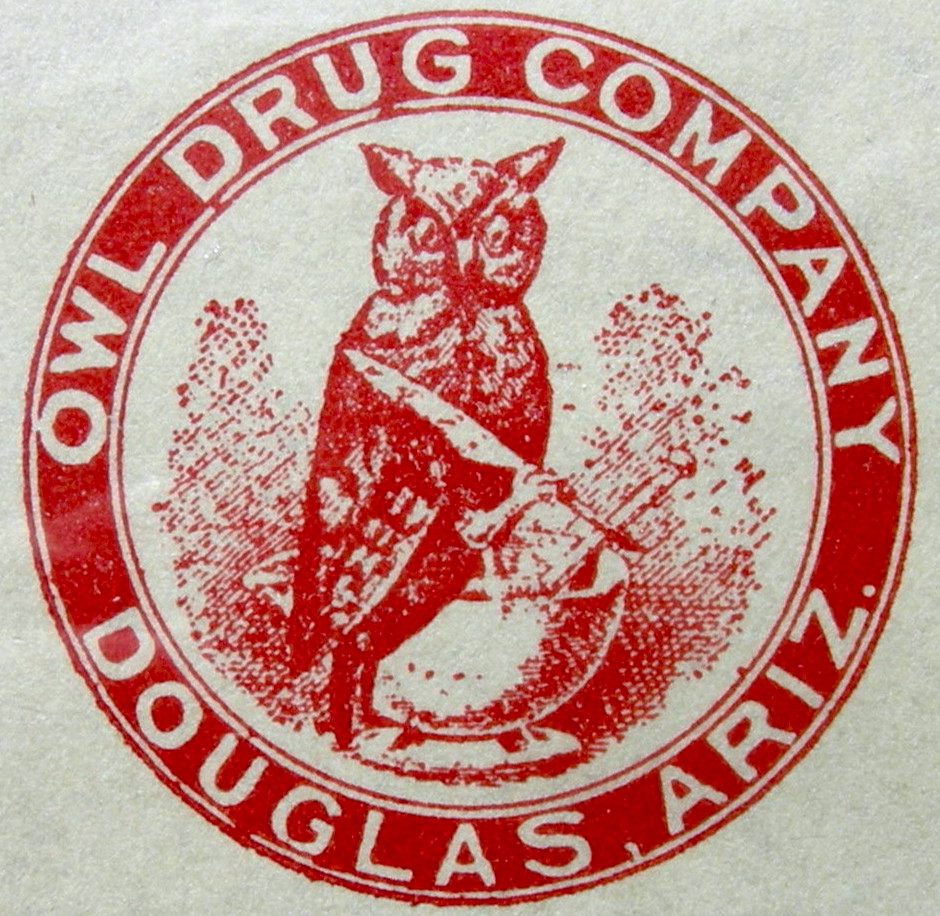
- Logo Prescription From 1917
- Company type: Private
- Industry: Retail Healthcare
- Founded: 1892
- Founder: Richard Elgin Miller
- Defunct: 1977
- Fate: Parent Company Went Defunct
- Headquarters: San Francisco, California
- Area served: Western United States

The Owl Drug Company was an American drugstore retailer with its headquarters in San Francisco that operated the Owl Drug Stores chain. It was a subsidiary of Rexall stores at its peak in the 1920s through 1940s. The Owl Drug Stores sold medicines and pills, and later ventured into cosmetics, perfumes, and other goods.

== History ==
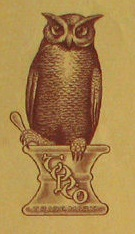
Owl Drugs logo (1916)

The founder of the Owl Drug Company was Richard Elgin Miller, R.E. Miller. The Owl Drug Company was established in 1892 in San Francisco, at 1128 Market Street. In 1903, with their contract with the Whitall Tatum Glass Company, they began making triangular, cobalt-blue bottles of various sizes to store poisons in, which was widely emulated. According to the book Old Owl Drug Bottles & Others (1968), Owl Drug created a variety of bottles for prescription medicine and pills, and also soda bottles, with an owl sitting atop a mortar and pestle molded into the glass. The bottles were produced in various sizes from .5 ounces (14 g) up to a (rarer) 32 ounces (910 g), over 10 inches (250 mm) in height. The bottles were also produced in other colors such as green, amber, and clear, and the logos on them often fluctuated from owls with a long tail to owls with no tail, with a short tail, with a potbelly, and others. These bottles are now collector's items, as are other company items such as tarot cards, receipts, advertising, stationery, calendars, and catalogs.

In the late 1800s, the main store at Mission and Sixteenth Streets was entirely rebuilt; it reopened in February 1910 with a soda fountain, one of the biggest in San Francisco at the time.

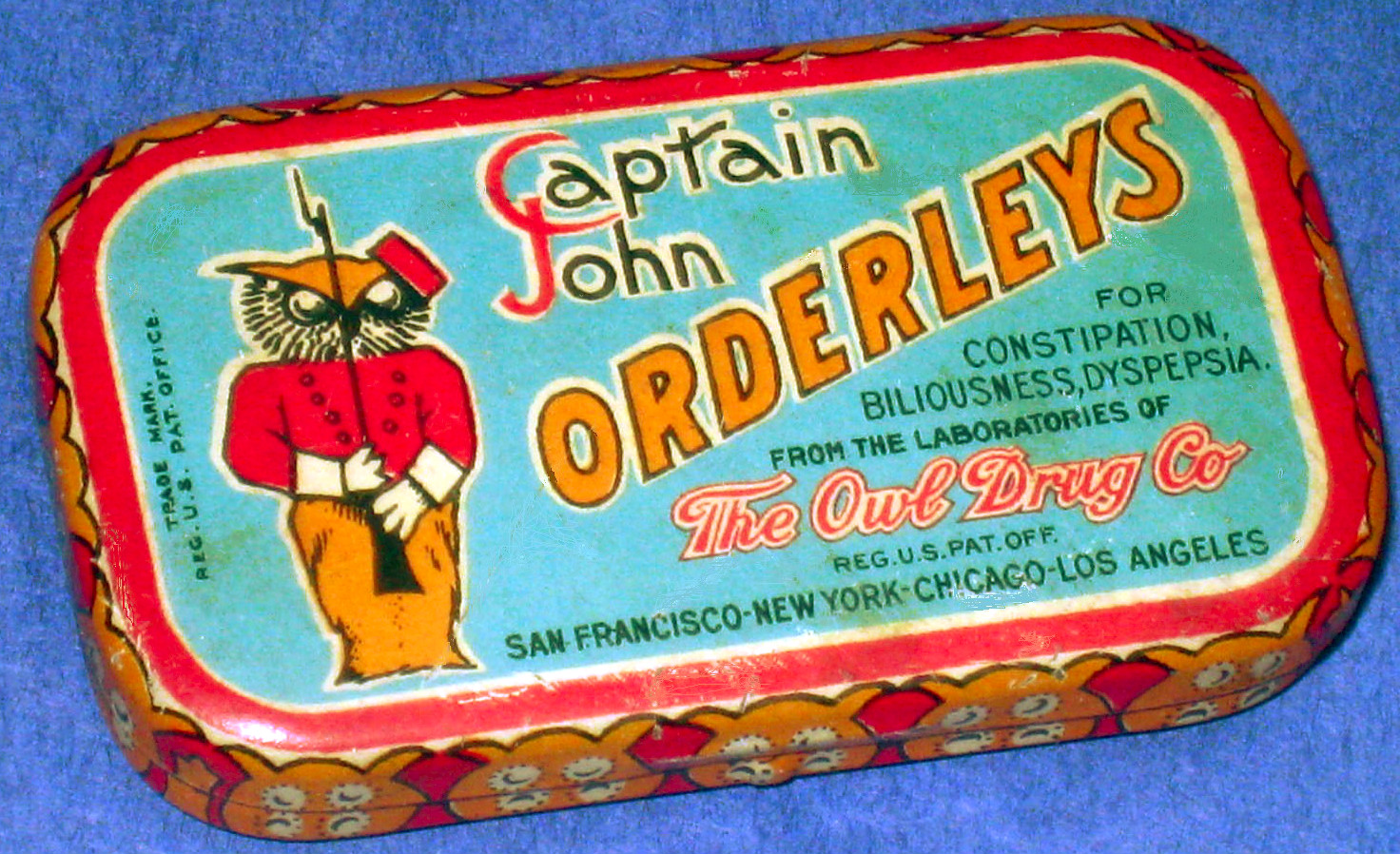
Captain John Orderleys laxative from The Owl Drug Company

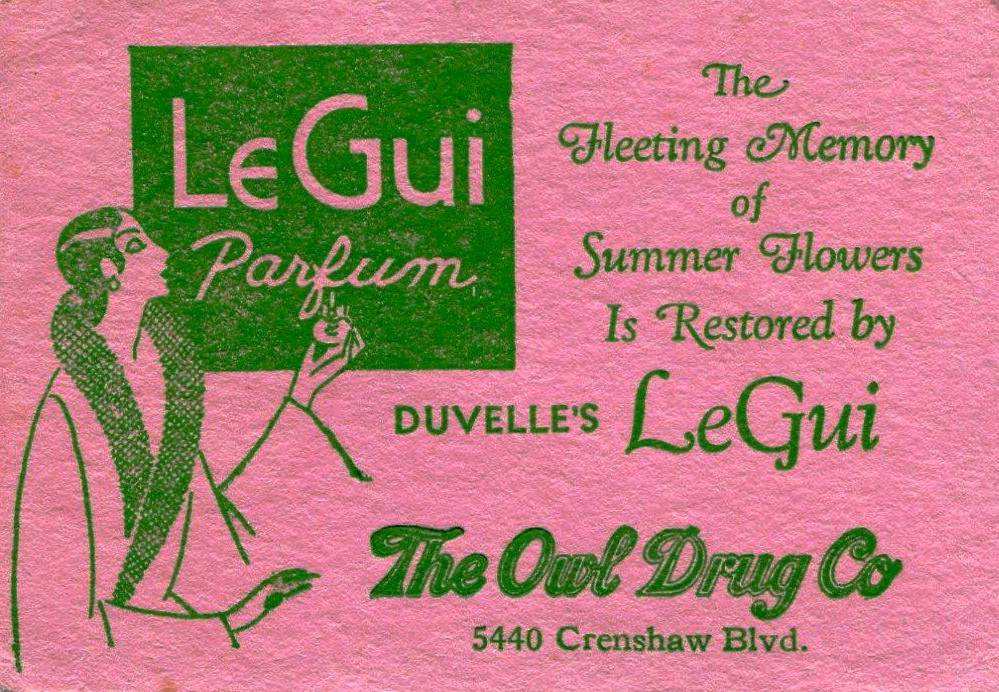
A perfume card from the 1920s

Until the mid 1920s, the company bought their goods directly from E. R. Squibb & Sons, but the agreement ended following a bitter legal battle in 1926. Elizabeth Winston Todd began working as a secretary for the firm in April 1929. In January, the firm announced a merger with United Drug Stores (Drug, Inc), one of a plethora of companies to fall under its wing over the years. In November 1931, the sub-manager of The Owl Drug Company placed $11,000 in the company safe, only to find all of it missing the next morning. The case was never solved. The following year, Owl Drug Company filed for bankruptcy, an act which was described as a "sham, simply a device to defraud preferred stockholders and void burdensome leases".

In October 1935, an employee of the company, Emma Bartholomai, suffered severe burns as the result of a fire which broke out in a false ceiling of a storeroom in the branch on Sixth and Broadway in Los Angeles; a worker of the Soule Steel Company had been welding in close proximity to the hazard. She took the company to court in 1940. The Bureau of Fire Investigation investigated the case and the court concluded in December 1940 that The Owl Drug Company had been negligent in permitting welding to have taken place, ruling: "The general rule is that persons in the lawful use of fire must exercise ordinary care to prevent it from injuring others".

Baseball player Rugger Ardizoia worked for the firm in the late 1940s during off-seasons. Cecil W. Law was chairman of the company for over 40 years.

== Branches ==
In 1912, Owl opened its fourth location in Downtown Los Angeles at Spring and 5th streets; an ad described its features:

Positively, it's the most modern drug establishment in Western America…money has been lavished on this beautiful store…it has the finest and most sanitary soda fountain in the entire West… made entirely of onyx and German silver…forty-two feet long… as long as the average city lot is wide. The ladies' waiting room is the most…commodious in the city… free telephones, a washroom, easy chairs and writing desk. …Store departments: Drugs and Chemicals - Toilet Articles and Perfumes - Brushes - Rubber Goods - Patent Medicines - Liquors - Candy - Cigars - Cutlery - Stationery - Soda Fountain

Later branches to open in Los Angeles suburban districts included 6380-84 Hollywood Boulevard (at Cahuenga Boulevard) in Los Angeles from 1934, and at Wilshire Boulevard and Western Avenue.

By the late 1930s, the company had dozens of branches across the United States, operating in major cities like New York and Chicago, and especially in the Los Angeles area.

In Fresno, the company had a branch at the 1000 Fulton Mall Building on Fulton Street and Tulare Street from 1917 until 1951. In San Diego, they operated a large store next to the Plaza Hotel. An Owl Drug Store was operating in Vancouver, British Columbia, Canada, at Cordova Street and Abbott Street from as early as 1894, but was not affiliated with the American chain.

== Big Owl ==
In 1951 Owl opened the large, 44,000 sq ft (4,100 m^{2}) Big Owl supermarket at Valley Plaza in North Hollywood. Big Owl stated that it had completed extensive research on shoppers' in-store behavior, the results of which it used to create a "revolutionary" store layout for Big Owl that would shorten the amount of walking required to complete a typical shopping trip. With the aim of providing the convenience of one-stop shopping, Big Owl also incorporated stores-in-store, which was uncommon at the time, including Van de Kamp's Bakeries, See's Candies, a "soda grill" for quick meals and snacks, a barber, cleaners, watch repair, and sales of china and gift items. It had 12 checkout lanes with electric cash registers, where shoppers could pay for goods from all the departments (a relatively recent innovation in markets at the time), nine entrances for the public, and its parking lot had space for 750 cars. Through a window, customers could watch meat be packed in cellophane, weighed, labeled and marked with a price, then watch a "tremendous, store-long" conveyor belt transport it to refrigerated cases in the store's meat sales area. Big Owl stated that its neon sign was the brightest in the U.S. west of Chicago. Thriftimart purchased the store in 1954., which was rebranded Thriftimart and it became a branch of that supermarket chain.

== Other interests ==
As a company which also sold perfumes and cosmetics, the Owl Drug Company ran "Beauty Weeks", which included a range of fashion-related entertainment including beauty contests judged by Elinor Glyn, in which winners received a Hollywood screen test. Their fashion shows were a considerable success and attracted many people.

In the mid-1940s, the firm sponsored a San Franciscan baseball team, known variously as the Portola Natives or Portola Merchants; the team temporarily called itself "The Owl Drugs Juniors". By 1949, it was no longer being sponsored by Owl Drugs but by the Theisen Glass Company.
