= Bernard Cohn =

Bernard Cohn may refer to:

- Bernard Cohn (politician) (1835–1889), American businessman and politician in Los Angeles
- Bernard Cohn (anthropologist) (1928–2003), anthropologist and scholar of British colonialism in India

== See also ==
- Bernard Cohen (disambiguation)
