= US Foods Chef'Store =

American grocery store chain

US Foods CHEF'STORE
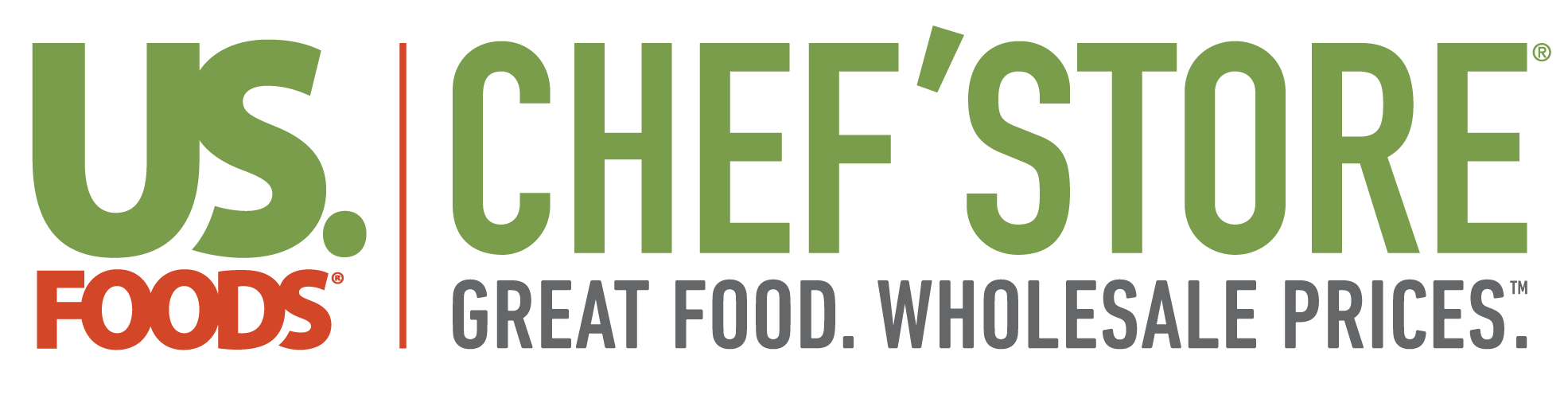
- Company type: Subsidiary
- Industry: Wholesale and Retail
- Founded: 1956; 70 years ago
- Headquarters: Portland, Oregon, U.S.
- Number of locations: 88
- Products: Grocery
- Parent: US Foods
- Website: www.chefstore.com

US Foods CHEF'STORE (formerly Smart Foodservice Warehouse Stores and Cash&Carry Smart Foodservice) is a chain of American warehouse grocery stores located in Arizona, California, Idaho, Montana, Nevada, North Carolina, Oklahoma, Oregon, South Carolina, Texas, Utah, Virginia, and Washington. The company operates 88 stores at the end of February 2023. One store in Arizona, 17 in California, 6 in Idaho, three in Montana, two in Nevada, two stores in North Carolina, one in Oklahoma, 21 in Oregon, four stores in South Carolina, one in Texas, two in Utah, one in Virginia, and 27 stores in Washington state. The company is based in West Linn, Oregon, and Rosemont, Illinois.

== History ==
Smart Foodservice Warehouse Stores operated as an independent division of Smart & Final, LLC between 2008 and 2020. In March 2020, US Foods agreed to acquire the Smart Foodservice Warehouse Stores from Apollo Global Management for $970 million. In March 2021, US Foods rebranded all Smart Foodservice Warehouse stores as US Foods CHEF'STORE.

Cash&Carry was established in 1955 by United Grocers and operated under the name United Grocers Cash&Carry with a single store in Oregon City, Oregon. In 1998, Smart Foodservice was acquired by Smart & Final and became known as Cash&Carry Smart Foodservice. In 2018, Cash&Carry Smart Foodservice announced its rebranding to Smart Foodservice Warehouse Stores. In June 2022, CHEF’STORE named Irfan Badibanga as the company president, succeeding Derek Jones. In July 2025, CHEF’STORE named Erin Walton as President, succeeding Irfan Badibanga.
