= McMahan's Furniture =

American furniture store chain

- Company type: private
- Industry: retail
- Founded: 1919, Bakersfield, California
- Founder: James I. McMahan
- Defunct: 2008
- Fate: Liquidation
- Headquarters: Santa Monica, California, United States
- Number of locations: 17 in 2008
- Area served: western United States
- Key people: James A. "Jay" McMahan, president
- Revenue: $45 million in 2007

McMahan's Furniture was a family-owned furniture retailer with stores in California, Arizona, New Mexico, Texas, Nevada, Colorado and Oregon. Much of its business came from customers to whom it provided credit.

== History ==
The first store was opened in 1919 in Bakersfield, California. In 1993, Heilig-Meyers bought 92 McMahan's stores for $65 million. In 1996, Heilig-Meyers arranged to buy another 20 stores from McMahan's. Whether the 1996 sale was completed is unknown. Of the stores remaining, three were closed in 2006. The last 17 stores, including two La-Z-Boy Furniture Gallery locations (one in California and one in Oregon), were closed in 2008. A company press release cited macroeconomic conditions as the reason:

McMahan’s Furniture announced today August 26, 2008 that it will close its furniture operations within the next few months. McMahan’s has implemented several strategies to react to the current business environment. However, as the economy has continued to slump, the market for home furnishings has continued to decline. McMahan’s has experienced downturns before and always managed to rebound, however, this decline dating back to late 2006 has been considerably longer and deeper than anything they’ve [sic] previously experienced.

== Lawsuit ==
In 1975, a water main near the company's Santa Monica store burst. The company and its insurer, Aetna, sued the city under the theory of inverse condemnation. The company wanted the jury to be instructed that

As to the merchandise losses suffered by plaintiffs, the compensation for those losses may be based on the retail value of the merchandise less average discounts.

but the court refused to give the instruction, and the jury awarded damages corresponding to the wholesale value. The lower court's decision was upheld on appeal. The court of appeals quoted a restatement of the law of torts saying that "damages for the profits which the wholesale dealer or the retail dealer would normally anticipate from a sale are not ordinarily allowed." The suit is considered one of "the leading cases" in California tort law about the value of inventory.
