= Bernard Cohn (politician) =

American politician (1835–1889)

15th Mayor of Los Angeles
- In office November 21, 1878 – December 5, 1878
- Preceded by: Frederick A. MacDougall
- Succeeded by: James R. Toberman

Acting Mayor of Los Angeles
- In office November 16, 1878 – November 21, 1878

President of the Los Angeles Common Council
- In office November 21, 1878 – December 5, 1878
- Preceded by: Frederick A. MacDougall
- Succeeded by: Samuel J. Beck

Member of the Los Angeles Common Council for the 4th ward
- In office December 12, 1887 – February 21, 1889
- In office December 11, 1880 – December 9, 1882

Member of the Los Angeles Common Council for the 2nd ward
- In office December 8, 1876 – December 5, 1878

Personal details
- Born: November 7, 1835 Prussia
- Died: November 1, 1889 (aged 53) Los Angeles, California

Bernard Cohn (November 7, 1835 – November 1, 1889) was a wool buyer and capitalist in 19th-century Los Angeles, California, as well as a member of the Los Angeles Common Council, that city's legislative body. It was Cohn who provided former California Governor Pio Pico a sum of money in exchange for all of Pico's property, which eventually led to Pico's spending the rest of his days in poverty. He was also known for maintaining two families, one Jewish and one Catholic, at opposite ends of the town.

== Personal ==
=== First family ===
Cohn, who had a brother, Kaspar and a sister, Mrs. Simon Cohn, was born November 7, 1835, in Prussia and settled in Los Angeles in 1857. He was married to Hulda Myer in Los Angeles in 1858, and they had three children, Julius Bernard, Carrie Cahen and Kaspar Cohn. His wife died of apoplexy in June 1885.

=== Death ===
Cohn died on November 1, 1889, as he was visiting friends. Brief services were held on November 3 in his First Street house near Main Street, and then a funeral cortege, more than a mile in length, made its way to the Jewish cemetery. An organized contingent of police officers took part, and pallbearers included Mayor Henry T. Hazard, former mayors Edward F. Spence and William H. Workman and merchant S. Lazard.

=== Second family ===
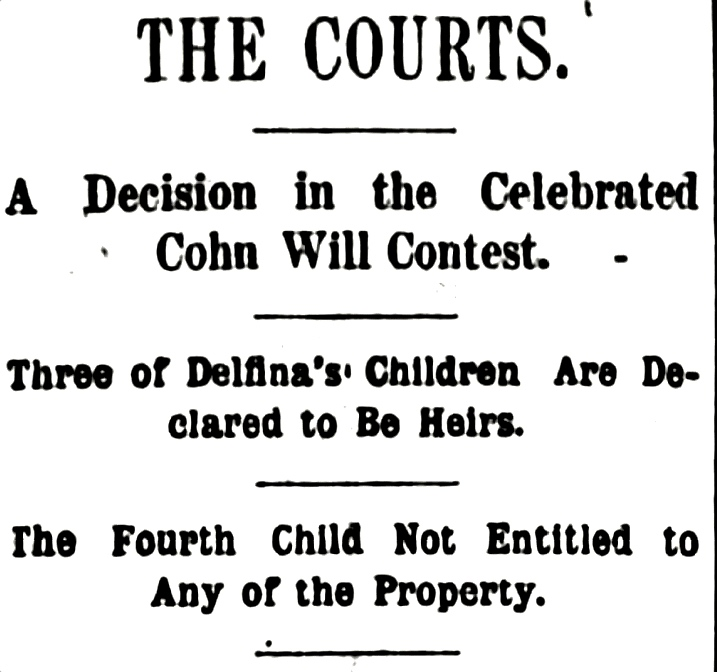
Headline over Los Angeles Times article announcing conclusion of notable case involving Bernard Cohn's estate, October 30, 1892

Within two weeks after Cohn's death, no will could be produced, and the right to share in his estate of $67,762 was demanded by a woman named Delphina Varelas, who claimed that Cohn had fathered her seven children, four of whom were still living—Bernard M.J, Miguel Daniel, Marcus Cerracio and Edward Anastacio. Verelas said she had met Cohn when she was 17 and he was about 30. They lived together on New High Street from 1872 to 1874, although Cohn had a wife who was still alive. Later Cohn provided houses for his second family on the Los Angeles Plaza, Sainsevin Street and Buena Vista Street. Cohn's estate included the Pico House, the St. Elmo Hotel and 1,100 acres of ranch land.

The trial was described as "one of the most sensational in the annals of the Probate Court," and more than three hundred witnesses were called, some of whom testified that Cohn and Varelas were considered husband and wife and some that she was "only Cohn's mistress." There was testimony that the couple had been married under a written contract, which Judge Clark nevertheless ruled to be invalid. Therefore, he decided in his judgment, the right of inheritance was applicable only in the case of three of Varelas's children—those whom Cohn had acknowledged to be his—and not to the eldest child or to Varelas herself. Upon appeal, a settlement was reached in which the three "legitimate" children would receive "the sum of $7300, in full satisfaction of their claim against the estate."

== Vocation ==
At the age of fourteen Cohn worked as a seaman on a vessel that sailed around Cape Horn and docked in San Francisco, where the boy left ship to head for the gold country. He worked on sheep ranches in Montana between 1851 and 1856, finally settling in Los Angeles in 1857. He set up as a wool buyer, with a loan and mortgage office, in a combined office-home at 182 Main Street. In 1871 he partnered with Herman W. Hellman, Abraham Haas, and Jacob Haas to open a grocery business on Los Angeles Street.

== Pio Pico ==
In 1883, Cohn made an arrangement with Pio Pico, the last Mexican governor of California, whereby Cohn handed over some sixty thousand dollars in exchange for a deed to Pico's property in Los Angeles and elsewhere in the county. Pico claimed the exchange amounted to a mortgage and when he offered to redeem the property, Cohn refused the offer, stating that the transaction had been a sale. Pico sued and lost in court and, on appeal, the California Supreme Court sided with Cohn in a decision that left Pico stripped of his property and virtually a pauper. The decision, Pico v. Cohn (1891) 91 Cal. 129, 133–134, is classically cited by California appellate courts in cases having to do with the setting-aside of a judgment in case of fraud.

== Public service ==
A Democrat, Cohn was elected to the Los Angeles Common Council in December 1876 to represent the 2nd Ward and served two one-year terms. He returned to the council in 1880 from the 4th Ward, was defeated in a re-election bid but came back again to win in 1887 and in 1888. Cohn was acting mayor of Los Angeles between November 21 and December 5, 1878, having been appointed by the Common Council to the position after the death of Frederick A. MacDougall. Cohn later ran for the mayoralty, but lost to J. R. Toberman.

Cohn worked to help the Jewish population of Los Angeles, founding and financing a Cohn Memorial Clinic for indigent Jews on Whittier Boulevard.

== Memberships ==
He was a member of what was said to be the city's first social club, called the Los Angeles Social Club, organized about 1869.
