= Los Angeles's 5th City Council district =

American legislative district

Councilmember
Katy Yaroslavsky; D–South Carthay
since December 12, 2022
- Demographics: 68.1% White; 3.1% Black; 11.2% Hispanic; 13.3% Asian; 0.3% Other
- Population (2020): 280,176
- Registered voters (2017): 167,884
- Website: cd5.lacity.gov

Los Angeles's 5th City Council district is one of the fifteen districts in the Los Angeles City Council. It is currently represented by Democrat Katy Yaroslavsky since 2022 after winning an election to succeed Paul Koretz, who termed out.

The district was created in 1925 after a new city charter was passed, which replaced the former "at large" voting system for a nine-member council with a district system with a 15-member council. The original district was mapped at its origin in 1925 in the West Adams district of Los Angeles, but over the years its boundaries have been shifted west and north in keeping with the city's population changes.

== Geography ==
The district covers all or a portion of Bel Air, Beverly Crest, Beverly Grove, Beverlywood, Carthay Circle, Century City, Cheviot Hills, Fairfax District, Holmby Hills, Melrose, Palms, Pico-Robertson, Westwood, Westside Village, and Encino.

The district overlaps California's 32nd, 36th, and 37th congressional districts, California's 24th and 28th State Senate district, and California's 42nd, 51st, 52nd, 55th, and 61st State Assembly districts.

=== Historical boundaries ===
The district was proceeded by the fifth ward, which was established in 1878 and added three seats to the Los Angeles Common Council, alongside the fourth ward. It encompassed the southern and western parts of the city. The district was obsolete when the at-large district was first established in 1889.

In 1889, the ward was re-established as a single-member ward, as part of the passing of the 1888 charter. It elected one member through a plurality vote before the ward became obsolete when the at-large district was re-established again in 1909.

In 1925, the district was created and originally encompassed the West Adams area, bounded on the north by Washington Boulevard, on the south by Exposition Boulevard, on the west by Robertson Boulevard and on the east approximately by Vermont Avenue. By 1933, it was bounded on the east by Vermont avenue, on the north by Wilshire Boulevard, on the west by La Brea avenue and on the south by Exposition Boulevard.

By 1937, it was bounded "on the east by Western to Pico, by Hobart to Washington, and by Vermont to Exposition and on the west by Crenshaw and Rimpau." In 1940, it was bounded on the north by Wilshire Boulevard, on the east by Western or Vermont, on the south by Exposition Boulevard, on the west by Arlington, Crenshaw and minor streets. By 1957, it was part of the Wilshire Boulevard area, extending to Westwood and West Los Angeles. In 1965, it ran from Fairfax Avenue to the San Diego Freeway and from Bel-Air and Beverly Hills south to Washington Boulevard.

== List of members representing the district ==
=== 1878–1889 ===
Dates	Councilmembers								
Dates	Councilmember	Party	Electoral history	Councilmember	Party	Electoral history	Councilmember	Party	Electoral history
Multi-member ward created 1878.
December 5, 1878 – December 5, 1879	Nathan R. Vail	Democratic	Elected in 1878. [data missing]	William B. Lawlor	Democratic	Elected in 1878. Re-elected in 1879. [data missing]	James G. McDonald	Democratic	Elected in 1878. Re-elected in 1879. Re-elected in 1880. [data missing]
December 5, 1879 – December 11, 1880	John P. Moran	Democratic	Elected in 1879. Re-elected in 1880. Re-elected in 1881. Re-elected in 1882. [data missing]	William B. Lawlor	Democratic	Elected in 1878. Re-elected in 1879. [data missing]	James G. McDonald	Democratic	Elected in 1878. Re-elected in 1879. Re-elected in 1880. [data missing]
December 11, 1880 – December 10, 1881	John P. Moran	Democratic	Elected in 1879. Re-elected in 1880. Re-elected in 1881. Re-elected in 1882. [data missing]	Walter S. Moore	Republican	Elected in 1880. Re-elected in 1881. Re-elected in 1882. Re-elected in 1883. Retired.	James G. McDonald	Democratic	Elected in 1878. Re-elected in 1879. Re-elected in 1880. [data missing]
December 10, 1881 – December 9, 1882	John P. Moran	Democratic	Elected in 1879. Re-elected in 1880. Re-elected in 1881. Re-elected in 1882. [data missing]	Walter S. Moore	Republican	Elected in 1880. Re-elected in 1881. Re-elected in 1882. Re-elected in 1883. Retired.	Otto G. Weyse	Democratic	Elected in 1881. Re-elected in 1882. [data missing]
December 9, 1882 – December 8, 1883	John P. Moran	Democratic	Elected in 1879. Re-elected in 1880. Re-elected in 1881. Re-elected in 1882. [data missing]	Walter S. Moore	Republican	Elected in 1880. Re-elected in 1881. Re-elected in 1882. Re-elected in 1883. Retired.	Otto G. Weyse	Democratic	Elected in 1881. Re-elected in 1882. [data missing]
December 8, 1883 – December 9, 1884	Daniel M. McGarry	Democratic	Elected in 1883. Re-elected in 1884. [data missing]	Walter S. Moore	Republican	Elected in 1880. Re-elected in 1881. Re-elected in 1882. Re-elected in 1883. Retired.	John B. Niles	Republican	Elected in 1883. Re-elected in 1884. Resigned.
December 9, 1884 – December 10, 1885	Daniel M. McGarry	Democratic	Elected in 1883. Re-elected in 1884. [data missing]	Hiram Sinsabaugh	Republican	Elected in 1884. Re-elected in 1885. Lost re-election.	John B. Niles	Republican	Elected in 1883. Re-elected in 1884. Resigned.
December 9, 1884 – December 10, 1885	Daniel M. McGarry	Democratic	Elected in 1883. Re-elected in 1884. [data missing]	Hiram Sinsabaugh	Republican	Elected in 1884. Re-elected in 1885. Lost re-election.	Vacant		
December 10, 1885 – December 13, 1886	Cyrus Willard	Democratic	Elected in 1885. Re-elected in 1886. [data missing]	Hiram Sinsabaugh	Republican	Elected in 1884. Re-elected in 1885. Lost re-election.	Jacob Frankenfield	Republican	Elected in 1885. Re-elected in 1886. Lost re-election.
December 13, 1886 – December 12, 1887	Cyrus Willard	Democratic	Elected in 1885. Re-elected in 1886. [data missing]	Horace Hiller	Republican	Elected in 1886. Re-elected in 1887. Lost re-election.	Jacob Frankenfield	Republican	Elected in 1885. Re-elected in 1886. Lost re-election.
December 12, 1887 – December 10, 1888	A. W. Barrett	Democratic	Elected in 1887. Re-elected in 1888. Redistricted to the single-member ward and lost re-election.	Horace Hiller	Republican	Elected in 1886. Re-elected in 1887. Lost re-election.	Hiram Sinsabaugh	Republican	Elected in 1887. Re-elected in 1888. Redistricted to the single-member ward and lost renomination.
December 10, 1888 – February 21, 1889	A. W. Barrett	Democratic	Elected in 1887. Re-elected in 1888. Redistricted to the single-member ward and lost re-election.	Austin C. Shafer	Republican	Elected in 1888. Redistricted to the single-member ward.	Hiram Sinsabaugh	Republican	Elected in 1887. Re-elected in 1888. Redistricted to the single-member ward and lost renomination.
Multi-member ward eliminated February 21, 1889.

=== 1889–1909 ===
Councilmember	Party	Dates	Electoral history
Single-member ward established February 25, 1889
Austin C. Shafer (Harvard Heights)	Republican	February 25, 1889 – December 5, 1890	Redistricted from the multi-member ward and re-elected in 1889. [data missing]
John Q. Tufts (Downtown)	Republican	December 5, 1890 – December 12, 1892	Elected in 1890. Retired to run for Mayor.
Freeman G. Teed (South Park)	Republican	December 12, 1892 – December 13, 1896	Elected in 1892. Re-elected in 1894. [data missing]
Charles H. Toll (Pico-Union)	Republican	December 16, 1896 – December 12, 1900	Elected in 1896. Re-elected in 1898. [data missing]
William M. Bowen (Exposition Park)	Republican	December 12, 1900 – December 8, 1904	Elected in 1900. Re-elected in 1902. [data missing]
George A. Smith (Arlington Heights)	Republican	December 8, 1904 – December 13, 1906	Elected in 1904. Retired to run for Mayor.
Albert J. Wallace (Hancock Park)	Republican	December 13, 1906 – December 10, 1909	Elected in 1906. Retired to run for Lieutenant Governor of California.
Single-member ward eliminated December 10, 1909

=== 1925–present ===
Councilmember	Party	Dates	Electoral history
District established July 1, 1925
Robert S. Sparks (Adams-Normandie)	Republican	July 1, 1925 – June 30, 1927	Elected in 1925. Lost re-election.
Virgil A. Martin (Jefferson Park)	Republican	July 1, 1927 – June 30, 1931	Elected in 1927. Lost re-election.
Roy Donley (Jefferson Park)	Democratic	July 1, 1931 – June 30, 1933	Elected in 1931. Lost re-election.
Byron B. Brainard (Adams-Normandie)	Republican	July 1, 1933 – June 30, 1939	Elected in 1933. Re-elected in 1937. Lost re-election.
Arthur E. Briggs (Adams-Normandie)	Democratic	July 1, 1939 – June 30, 1941	Elected in 1939. Lost re-election.
Ira J. McDonald (Harvard Heights)	Democratic	July 1, 1941 – June 30, 1945	Elected in 1941. Re-elected in 1943. Retired to run for Mayor.
George P. Cronk (Mid-Wilshire)	Republican	July 1, 1945 – June 30, 1953	Elected in 1945. Re-elected in 1947. Re-elected in 1949. Re-elected in 1951. Retired.
Rosalind W. Wyman (Bel Air)	Democratic	July 1, 1953 – June 30, 1965	Elected in 1953. Re-elected in 1955. Re-elected in 1957. Re-elected in 1961. Lost re-election.
Edmund D. Edelman (West L.A.)	Democratic	July 1, 1965 – December 1, 1974	Elected in 1965. Re-elected in 1969. Re-elected in 1973. Resigned when elected to the L.A. County Board of Supervisors.
Vacant		December 1, 1974 – July 1, 1975	
Zev Yaroslavsky (Fairfax District)	Democratic	July 1, 1975 – December 1, 1994	Elected in 1975. Re-elected in 1977. Re-elected in 1981. Re-elected in 1985. Re-elected in 1989. Re-elected in 1993. Resigned when elected to the L.A. County Board of Supervisors.
Vacant		December 1, 1994 – July 1, 1995	Assistant Chief Legislative Analyst Avak Keotahian appointed as caretaker until next election.
Mike Feuer (Beverly Grove)	Democratic	July 1, 1995 – June 30, 2001	Elected in 1995. Re-elected in 1997. Retired to run for City Attorney.
Jack Weiss (Westwood)	Democratic	July 1, 2001 – June 30, 2009	Elected in 2001. Re-elected in 2005. Retired to run for City Attorney.
Paul Koretz (Fairfax District)	Democratic	July 1, 2009 – December 12, 2022	Elected in 2009. Re-elected in 2013. Re-elected in 2017. Term-limited and ran for City Controller.
Katy Yaroslavsky (South Carthay)	Democratic	December 12, 2022 – present	Elected in 2022. Re-elected in 2026.
