= Weyse =

Weyse is a surname. Notable people with the surname include:

- Christoph Ernst Friedrich Weyse (1774–1842), Danish composer
- Otto G. Weyse (1858–1893), American liquor and wine dealer
