= James T. Carroll (California politician) =

American politician (1876–1939)

James Tilden Carroll
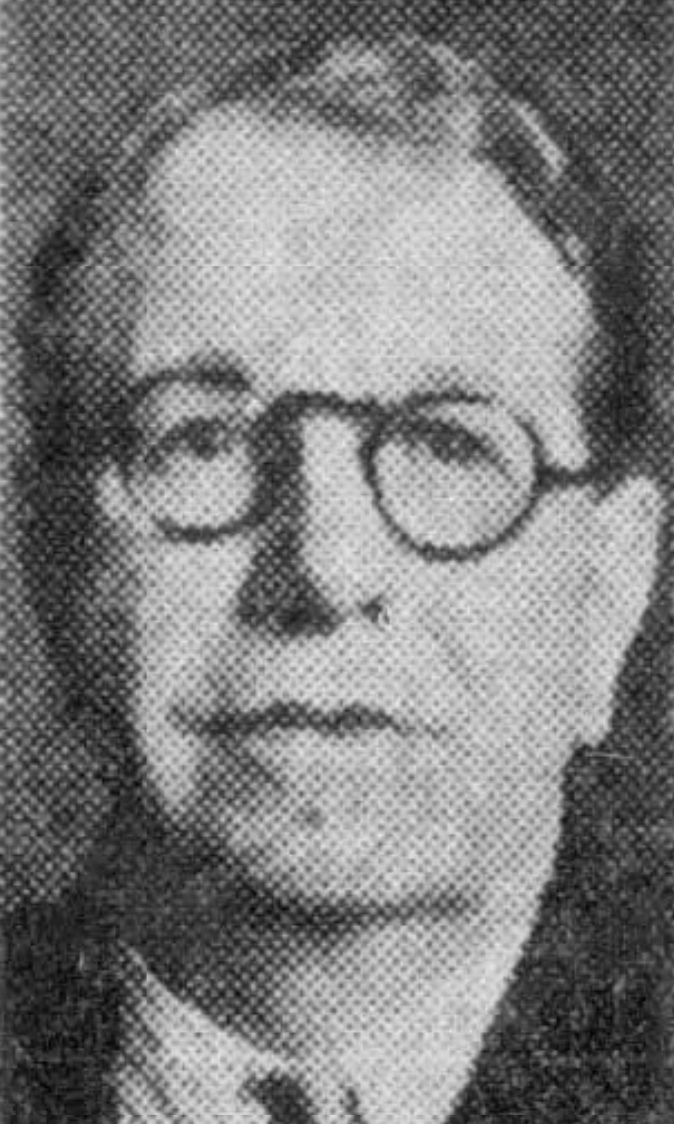
- Carroll inn 1933

Member of the Los Angeles City Council for the 12th district
- In office March 17, 1933 – June 30, 1933
- Preceded by: Thomas Francis Ford
- Succeeded by: John W. Baumgartner

Personal details
- Born: September 22, 1876 Assumption, Illinois
- Died: February 9, 1939 (aged 62) Los Angeles, California
- Party: Democratic

James Tilden Carroll (22 September 1876 – 9 February 1939) in 1933 served 103 days as 12th District member of the Los Angeles City Council to fill out the unexpired term of Thomas Francis Ford, who had been elected to the U.S. Congress the preceding year.

== Biography ==
Carroll was born in Assumption, Illinois on 22 September 1876 to James J. Carroll and Eliza Brown Booker. On 9 January 1901 in Assumption, Illinois he married Mary Jane Conley. By 1918 he had moved to Montana where he worked as a clerk for the Montana Supreme Court. He moved to California around 1927. He was secretary of the Northwest Chamber of Commerce, a member of the Municipal League and of the executive council of the Holy Name Society. He lived with his family at 226 Rampart Boulevard.

He died on 9 February 1939 in Los Angeles, California at the age of 62 after a surgical procedure. Surviving were his widow, Mary Jane; three sons, Leo, John and James T. Carroll, Jr.; and three daughters, Betty, Joan and Kathleen.

== Public service ==
Carroll was appointed temporarily to the 12th District seat by the City Council on March 17, 1931, by eight votes for him, one vote for former Councilman Douglas Eads Foster and one vote for Lois Williams, Ford's secretary. Carroll said he would not be a candidate for the full two-year term beginning July 1 and that he would retain Mrs. Williams in her position. He did run for the balance of the unexpired term in the May 1933 election and was chosen over the other candidate for the short-term job, George W. Scott. He thus served about fourteen weeks as council member for District 12.

Carroll was a candidate for the Democratic nomination for Congress in the 14th District in the August 1934 primary election.

Preceded by Thomas Francis Ford	Los Angeles City Council; 12th district 1933	Succeeded by John W. Baumgartner
