= Thomas F. Ford =

American politician

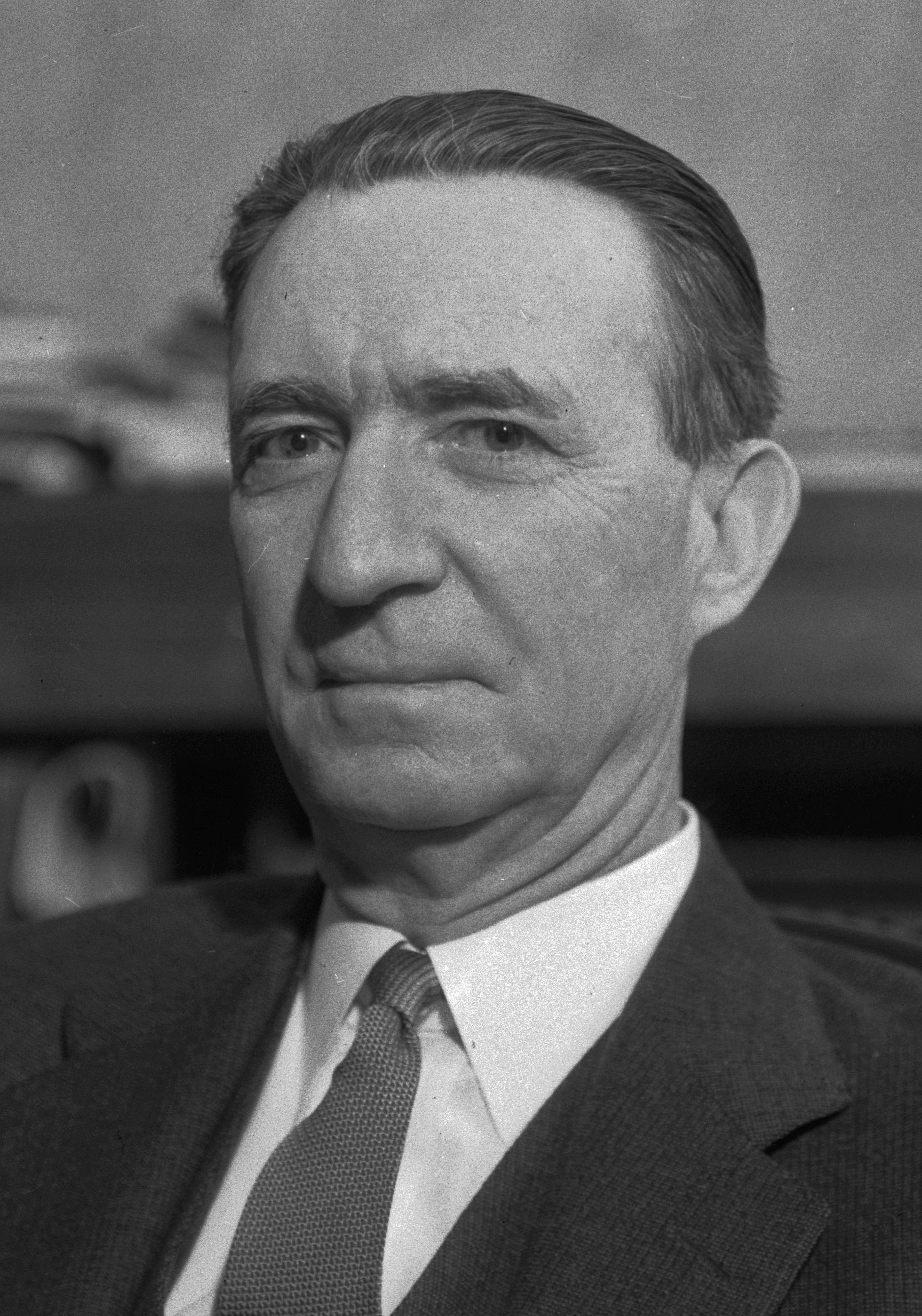
- Ford in the 1920s

Member of the U.S. House of Representatives from California's 14th district
- In office March 4, 1933 – January 3, 1945
- Preceded by: District established
- Succeeded by: Helen Gahagan Douglas

Member of the Los Angeles City Council for 12th district
- In office June 3, 1931 – March 1, 1933
- Preceded by: Thomas W. Williams
- Succeeded by: James T. Carroll

Personal details
- Born: Thomas Francis Ford; February 18, 1873 St. Louis, Missouri
- Died: December 26, 1958 (aged 85) South Pasadena, California
- Resting place: Forest Lawn Memorial Park, Glendale
- Party: Democratic
- Spouse: Martha Alison McCracken (m. 1901; died 1905)

Thomas Francis Ford (February 18, 1873 – December 26, 1958) was an American politician, journalist, and editor who served six terms as a member of the U.S. House of Representatives from California from 1933 to 1945. He was previously a member of the Los Angeles City Council, and the only member to have been elected by a write-in vote.

== Early life and career ==
Ford was born on February 18, 1873, in St. Louis, Missouri, the son of Thomas Ford and Ellen Ferris. He went to public and private schools in Saint Louis and in Toledo, Ohio, and studied law in that city.

=== Journalism career ===
He was with the U.S. Post Office Department after 1896 and then moved westward in 1900 to work on newspapers in Idaho and Washington, before arriving in Los Angeles in 1904. Thomas Francis Ford married Martha Alison McCracken on October 22, 1901, in Pittsburgh, Pennsylvania. Martha died February 5, 1905, in Toledo, Lucas, Ohio.

Ford traveled extensively in Europe between 1909 and 1913, where he wrote newspaper feature articles on foreign trade. On June 21, 1911, he was married in Los Angeles to Lillian Cope Cummings, with whom he wrote a book, The Foreign Trade of the United States, published in 1920. Between 1913 and 1918 he was the West Coast correspondent for the Washington Post, and on January 1, 1919, he became the literary editor of the Los Angeles Times, where he also edited the rotogravure section. He was a lecturer on international trade at the University of Southern California in 1920–21. In the 1930s he was living at 940 North Benton Way, Los Angeles.

=== City Council ===
By October 1930, Ford had left the Times and was working in the publicity department of the city's Water and Power Department. He resigned on December 11, 1930.

He ran for the 12th District seat in 1931, and, "supported by friends and supporters of the late incumbent" councilman Thomas W. Williams in that district, he was nominated by a write-in vote in the primary. He beat Douglas E. Foster in the final election by 8,315 votes to 5,882.

Highlights of his two years as a councilman included:

- 1931 Voting against instructing the city attorney to appeal a judge's decision ordering the city to stop the practice of segregating its swimming pools by race. The vote was 6 in favor of an appeal and 8 opposed, including Ford, a vote that resulted in the pools' being immediately desegregated in summer 1931.
- 1931 Submitting a motion calling on the Police Department to "concentrate its efforts on major crime instead of petty infractions of the law." He claimed that underworld "gambling joints flourish under 'protection' to the extent that it has become a citywide scandal."
- 1932 Investigating reports that City Prosecutor Johnson had issued an unusually high number of special investigators badges in advance of an election in which Johnson was running for a municipal judgeship in opposition to Judge Isaac Pacht. "We feel that the people of Los Angeles are entitled to know why the badges were issued, to whom presented, for what purpose, and who paid for them," he said. Pacht won the election.
- 1932 Sponsoring a proposal that would have the city establish a public works program for the unemployed, with the workers being paid in certificates that would be used in lieu of cash. The certificates would have been financed by a voluntary 4-cent tax on each merchant handling them.
- 1932 Attacking Mayor John C. Porter over the mayor's attempts to remove three members of the Water and Power Commission, one of whom was Ford's former campaign manager.
- 1932 Proposing a pay cut of 8.3 percent for city workers instead of reducing the work week to five days as previously ordered by the council.

== Congress ==
Ford, a Democrat, ran for election to the US House of Representatives in 1932. He won and served six terms in the U.S. Congress from 1933 to 1945. He was not a candidate for renomination in 1944.

During the 1934 California gubernatorial election, Ford backed Upton Sinclair and his "End Poverty in California" program.

== Death ==
Ford died on December 26, 1958, in his home at 1705 Spruce Street, South Pasadena, and was buried at Forest Lawn Memorial Park, Glendale.

== Electoral history ==
1932 United States House of Representatives elections
Party	Candidate	Votes	%
Democratic	Thomas F. Ford	47,368	57.1
Republican	William D. Campbell	35,598	42.9
Total votes		82,966	100.0
Turnout			
Democratic win (new seat)			

1934 United States House of Representatives elections
Party	Candidate	Votes	%
Democratic	Thomas F. Ford (Incumbent)	52,761	61.0
Republican	William D. Campbell	33,945	37.1
Progressive Party (US, 1924)	Lyndon R. Foster	2,487	2.7
Socialist	Harry Sherr	1,130	1.2
Communist	Lawrence Ross	1,086	1.2
Total votes		91,409	100.0
Turnout			
Democratic hold			

1936 United States House of Representatives elections
Party	Candidate	Votes	%
Democratic	Thomas F. Ford (Incumbent)	63,365	61.0
Republican	William D. Campbell	25,497	24.6
Progressive Party (US, 1924)	Albert L. Johnson	12,874	12.4
Communist	Harold J. Ashe	1,329	1.3
Socialist	Glen Trimble	770	0.7
Total votes		103,855	100.0
Turnout			
Democratic hold			

1938 United States House of Representatives elections
Party	Candidate	Votes	%
Democratic	Thomas F. Ford (Incumbent)	67,588	68.3
Republican	William D. Campbell	31,375	31.7
Total votes		98,963	100.0
Turnout			
Democratic hold			

1940 United States House of Representatives elections
Party	Candidate	Votes	%
Democratic	Thomas F. Ford (Incumbent)	73,137	64.3
Republican	Herbert L. Herberts	37,939	33.3
Communist	Pettis Perry	2,732	2.4
Total votes		113,808	100.0
Turnout			
Democratic hold			

1942 United States House of Representatives elections
Party	Candidate	Votes	%
Democratic	Thomas F. Ford (Incumbent)	49,326	67
Republican	Herbert L. Herberts	24,349	33
Total votes		73,675	100
Turnout			
Democratic hold			

U.S. House of Representatives
Preceded by —	Member of the U.S. House of Representatives from California's 14th congressional district 1933–1945	Succeeded by Helen Gahagan Douglas
Political offices
Preceded by Thomas W. Williams	Los Angeles City Council; 12th district 1931–33	Succeeded by James T. Carroll
