= J. Don Mahaffey =

American politician (c. 1876–1932)

J. Donnell Mahaffey, known as J. Don Mahaffey, (ca. 1876–1932) was a Los Angeles County supervisor from 1930 to 1932.

== Biography ==
Mahaffey was born in Williamsport, Pennsylvania, and educated there. He attended Media University, after which he became an accountant and was employed by the Pennsylvania Railroad Company. He moved to Los Angeles in 1902 and became affiliated with the Hollywood Lumber Company. In Hollywood he was director of the Hollywood Board of Trade and later became president of its successor, the Hollywood Chamber of Commerce. He was also president of the Hollywood Kiwanis Club and was in the Masons.

== Public life ==
Mahaffey, a Republican, was elected to the Los Angeles County Board of Supervisors in 1930 and died in office.

== See also ==
- A.J. Barnes, Los Angeles City Council member, later a Mahaffey field deputy
