= George P. Cronk =

American politician

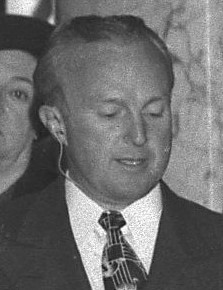
- Cronk in 1948

Member of the Los Angeles City Council from the 5th district
- In office July 1, 1945 – June 30, 1953
- Preceded by: Ira J. McDonald
- Succeeded by: Rosalind Wiener Wyman

Personal details
- Born: January 19, 1904 Omaha, Nebraska
- Died: June 15, 1996 (aged 92) Los Angeles, California
- Party: Republican
- Children: 2

George Parkman Cronk (January 19, 1904 – June 15, 1996) was an insurance man who was on the Los Angeles City Council from 1945 to 1952.

== Biography ==
Cronk was born January 19, 1904, in Omaha, Nebraska, and was brought to Los Angeles in 1910. He was graduated from the University of Southern California. He and his wife had two daughters, Constance (later Mrs. John Lamer) and Sally (later Mrs. Stanley Lewis Walsh). They lived at 899 Victoria Avenue.

He began his Los Angeles insurance business in 1924. During World War II he was an instructor at North American Aviation. He was a member of the Kiwanis Club, Trojan Club, Sons of the American Revolution, the Los Angeles Athletic Club, Lakeside Country Club and the Masons. After his City Council service ended in 1953, he was county campaign director for the American Cancer Society and later the finance director for Southern California for the California Taxpayers Association.

He died June 15, 1996.

== Public service ==
=== Manhattan Beach ===
Cronk was a member of the Manhattan Beach, California, Board of Education from 1939 to 1942.

=== Los Angeles ===
During World War II Cronk was vice chairman of the War Chest in the Wilshire District and the United Service Organizations, also in the Wilshire District.

==== City Council ====
===== Elections =====
Cronk was elected to the Los Angeles City Council District 5 seat in 1945, succeeding Ira J. McDonald, who had quit the post to run unsuccessfully for mayor. Cronk was endorsed by the conservative American Federation of Labor in that race, whereas the rival and more liberal Congress of Industrial Organizations went for Robert J. Kennedy. Cronk was reelected in the primary votes of 1945 through 1951 but did not run in 1953. Instead, he took on the job of campaign manager for Norris Poulson, who was successful in ousting Mayor Fletcher Bowron that year.

The 5th District was "part of the general Wilshire area" in 1949.

===== Positions =====
Cronk was known as a conservative who took these positions while on the City Council:

Airplanes, 1946. The council unanimously adopted a resolution he offered asking "all authorities" to curb "exuberant young flyers" who had been piloting their airplanes too low over residential areas.

Loyalty, 1949. Cronk initiated a loyalty-oath requirement for city employees, "which brought down the wrath of all Communist front organizations upon him."

Rents, 1950. He introduced a resolution adopted by the council that called on the federal government to end wartime rent control in Los Angeles, but when the government refused to do so, he said that refusal was an indication of "how far this great nation has drifted down the road to Socialism" and that "all Americans should be gravely concerned."

Housing, 1951–53. It was Cronk, "an enemy of public housing since its inception," who introduced a controversial motion that eventually ended a $110 million public-housing program in the city. In a council meeting the next year he angrily castigated Leo A. Vie, a city housing commissioner, who was reported to have said that opponents of the program were "scum." He said that Vie should be "asked to resign." Other council members supported the commissioner's right of free speech. The council sent Cronk to Sacramento to lobby the State Assembly in support of bills that would "limit autocratic powers of public housing authorities."

Preceded by Ira J. McDonald	Los Angeles City Council; 5th District; 1945–52	Succeeded by Rosalind Wiener Wyman
