= Arthur E. Briggs =

American politician

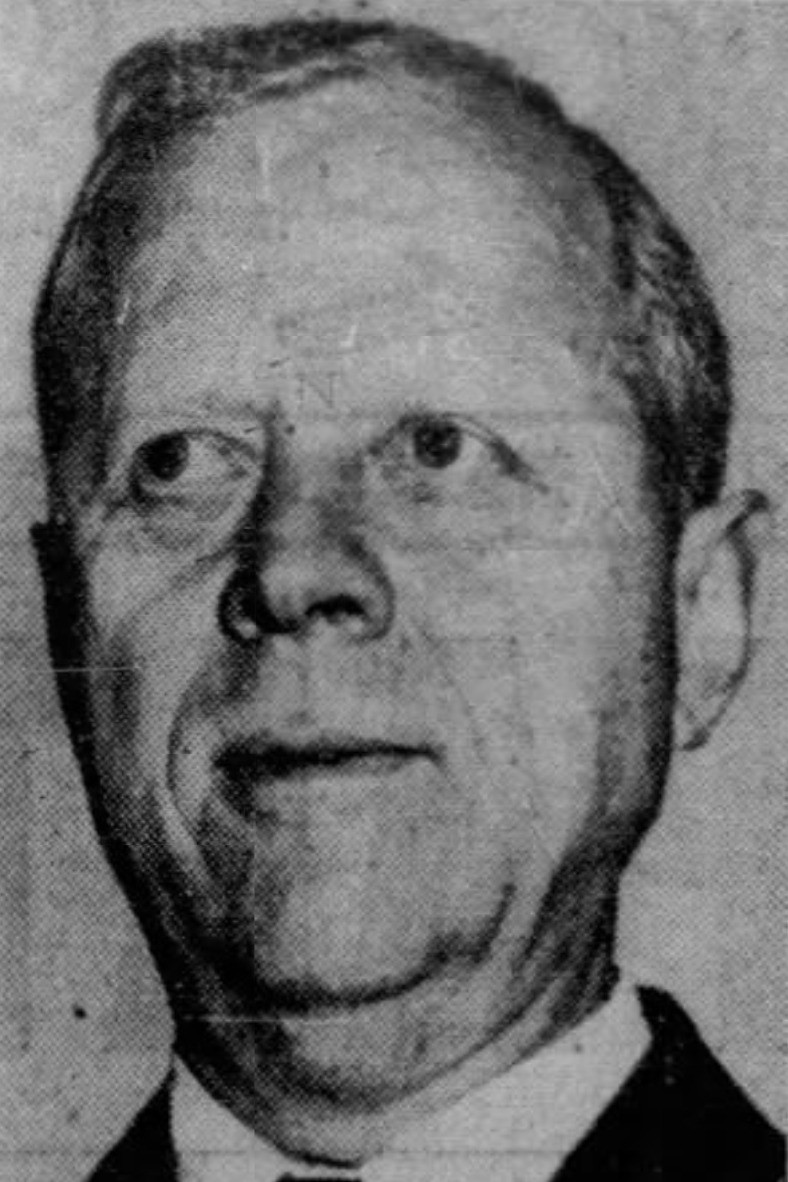
- Briggs in 1939

Member of the Los Angeles City Council from the 5th district
- In office July 1, 1939 – June 30, 1941
- Preceded by: Byron B. Brainard
- Succeeded by: Ira J. McDonald

Personal details
- Born: April 26, 1881 Kansas, U.S.
- Died: July 25, 1969 (aged 88) Los Angeles, California, U.S.
- Party: Democratic

Arthur Elbert Briggs (April 26, 1881 – July 25, 1969) was a teacher and law school dean who was a Los Angeles City Council member from 1939 to 1941 and the leader of the Ethical Society of Los Angeles in 1953.

== Biography ==
Briggs was born on April 26, 1881 in Kansas and came to Los Angeles in 1923; In 1925 he was working at the Elliot-Horne Company as an attorney and was hired at Polytechnic High School to teach law at night. In 1929 he was on the executive committee of the Los Angeles Municipal League, and in August of that year he was the chairman of a meeting in Trinity Auditorium that urged the pardoning of Tom Mooney, who was serving a life term in San Quentin Prison for the bombing of a Preparedness Day parade in San Francisco in 1916.

By 1932 he was dean of the Metropolitan University law college, Briggs was the leader of the Ethical Society of Los Angeles in 1953.

He died on July 25, 1969, in Los Angeles and was survived by his wife, Leah; a daughter, Mary White of San Francisco; and two sisters, Rena Briggs and Gertrude Pefley, both of Parsons, Kansas. The remains were sent to Parsons for service and interment.

== Public service ==
=== Elections ===
==== Judicial offices ====
Briggs and three other candidates ran against incumbent Superior Court Judge Harry E. Sewell, office no. 16, in 1934. In a talk at the Women's Civic Club, Briggs "took occasion to denounce The Los Angeles Times. He declared that in a radio talk he had been attacked as being a radical and denied the accusation."

In 1936, Briggs ran for a Superior Court judgeship again, this time against incumbent Caryl M. Sheldon, office no. 8.

==== City Council ====
Briggs challenged incumbent Councilman Byron B. Brainard in the 5th Councilmanic District in 1939 and won in the final vote. Two years later, however, he lost to Ira J. McDonald. He tried for reelection in 1943, but finished third among three candidates.

=== Controversies ===
Briggs's service on the City Council between 1939 and 1941 saw these controversies:

Government: Briggs joined Council Member Norris J. Nelson in proposing a combined city-county government with a borough system for Los Angeles.

Legal ethics: During a council meeting, Briggs engaged in a lengthy and spirited debate with attorney James L. Beebe, president of the Los Angeles Chamber of Commerce over Beebe's neutrality in acting as an agent of the city. Beebe retorted:

I do not propose to be lectured by a dean of a law school, of which a State Bar publication reports that only one of 25 students passes the examinations.

Briggs said his students failed to pass examinations because the "lawyer's union" made the requirements so high that "only privileged men can pass them."

Mayor: Briggs was appointed head of a committee of five council members to call on Mayor Fletcher Bowron to complain about "persistent and erroneous" remarks the mayor made about the council in his radio addresses. The council also adopted Briggs's resolution "to seek channels for publicity to present the true facts to the public."

Rebuke: By a 10-4 vote, the City Council administered an official rebuke to Briggs after it learned of a speech he had made to a meeting of the Amalgamated Clothing Workers in March 1939 in which Briggs made "caustic comments" about his fellow council members. President Robert L. Burns asked that the members "discontinue personal remarks about their colleagues."

Baker Block: Briggs was chairman of a committee that attempted to raise money for the relocation of the historic Baker Block, a historic 19th Century building, to another location, restore it and "make it a museum of Los Angeles history."

Moral Rearmament: A request by Councilman Carl C. Rasmussen that the council ask Mayor Bowron to proclaim a Moral Rearmament Week failed. with Briggs declaring that the program was "not a governmental matter, but one of personal interest and entirely outside the sphere" of the council.

Red-baiting: Briggs led the successful fight against a City Council resolution proposed by Roy Hampton asking Mayor Bowron to remove activist Don Healy from a City Charter Revision Committee on the grounds that he was a Communist.

"It is a dirty and contemptible procedure, all too common in this community," Briggs charged, referring to the resolution. for which he roundly condemned Hampton, although stating that he, Briggs, had never agreed with the doctrine of the Communists. Briggs reviewed similar accusations of Communism that he said had been made against him, and which he declared had been disproved in court. . . . Hampton retorted that such an action could be expected from "a former self-confessed ward-heeler of the Pendergast political machine in Kansas City."

Civil defense: He fiercely opposed the appointment of retired Army Colonel Halsey E. Yates to be "home defense coordinator" for Los Angeles, decrying the idea as the organization of a special police force to "run the affairs of the city in a secret and high-handed way."

== Published works ==
- Walt Whitman, Thinker and Artist (New York: 1952), Philosophical Library
- Pioneers of American Freedom: Origin of Liberal and Radical Thought in America, by Rudolf Rocker, 1949 (translated by Briggs)

| Preceded by Byron B. Brainard | Los Angeles City Council; 5th District; 1939–41 | Succeeded by Ira J. McDonald |
