= Katy Yaroslavsky =

American attorney and politician (born 1980)

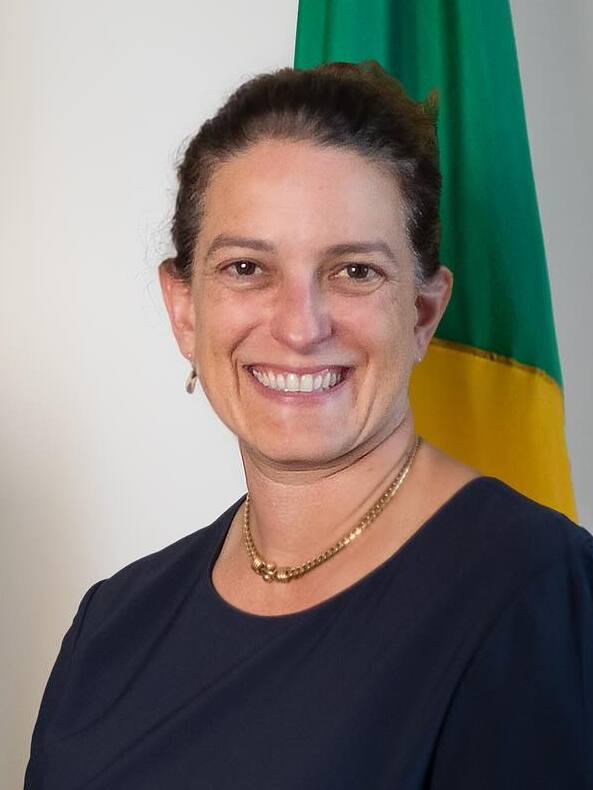
- Yaroslavsky in 2024

Member of the Los Angeles City Council from the 5th district
- Incumbent
- Assumed office December 12, 2022
- Preceded by: Paul Koretz

Personal details
- Born: Katharine Elizabeth Young; May 30, 1980 (age 46) Los Angeles, California, U.S.
- Party: Democratic
- Spouse: David Yaroslavsky
- Children: 3
- Relatives: Zev Yaroslavsky (father-in-law)
- Education: University of California, Berkeley (BA); University of California, Los Angeles (JD)

Katharine Elizabeth Young Yaroslavsky (born May 30, 1980) is an American attorney and politician who is currently a member of the Los Angeles City Council representing the 5th district. A member of the Democratic Party, Yaroslavsky placed first in the 2022 election to replace Paul Koretz, before winning in the general election against attorney Sam Yebri.

The daughter-in-law of influential Los Angeles politician Zev Yaroslavsky, she worked in the office of Sheila Kuehl, whom her mother previously worked for.

== Early life and career ==
Yaroslavsky was born Katharine Elizabeth Young on May 30, 1980. She graduated Phi Beta Kappa with a Bachelor's degree from University of California, Berkeley and received her Juris Doctor degree from University of California, Los Angeles.

Yaroslavsky got into politics as a deputy for Sheila Kuehl when Kuehl was elected to the Los Angeles County Board of Supervisors; her mother Laura Plotkin served on Kuehl's staff when she was in the California State Legislature. While a deputy, she helped with the creation of the Office of Sustainability and the creation and passing of Measure W in 2018. Before being named in Kuehl's staff, she was the general counsel and director of government affairs at the nonprofit Climate Action Reserve.

== Political career ==
=== Los Angeles City Council ===
In September 2021, Yaroslavsky announced that she would be running to replace Paul Koretz on the Los Angeles City Council for the 5th district. In the primary election, Yaroslavsky and Sam Yebri advanced to the general runoff election, with Yaroslavsky taking a majority of the votes. In the general election, Yaroslavsky won against Yebri in a landslide.

In 2023, she was named to be on the Transportation Committee, the first all-female committee, alongside Traci Park, Eunisses Hernandez, Nithya Raman, and Heather Hutt.

==== Budget and Finance Committee ====
Yaroslavsky serves as chair of the City Council's Budget and Finance Committee. She assumed the role ahead of the 2025–26 budget cycle, during which the city faced a roughly $1 billion budget shortfall. During the FY 2025–26 budget discussions, Yaroslavsky opposed proposed cuts that included the elimination of hundreds of LAPD civilian positions and reductions to core city services. The budget adopted by the City Council restored hundreds of positions proposed for elimination and modified the mayor's proposed spending plan.

In September 2025, Yaroslavsky was one of two council members to vote against the city's $2.62 billion Los Angeles Convention Center expansion, calling the project "unrealistic, unaffordable, and fiscally irresponsible." Initial cost estimates of $1.4 billion in June 2024 had risen to $2.7 billion before being reduced to $2.62 billion after negotiations. City Controller Kenneth Mejia also urged against the project. The council approved the expansion 11–2.

==== Housing ====
Yaroslavsky introduced a motion alongside Council President Paul Krekorian, Councilmember Nithya Raman, and Councilmember Bob Blumenfield to permanently codify Mayor Karen Bass's Executive Directive 1, which expedited approval for 100% affordable housing projects. The motion was approved 12–0.

In 2024, Yaroslavsky introduced a separate motion seeking additional design review for ED1 projects in Historic Preservation Overlay Zones, areas the city has designated for architectural preservation. Her office stated the goal was not to stop affordable housing in historic zones but to ensure projects were better integrated into existing neighborhoods. Housing advocates noted that HPOZ exemptions, combined with other existing carve-outs, would render a portion of the city ineligible for the fast-track program.

In March 2026, the City Council voted to adopt a local upzoning strategy covering 55 transit-oriented development areas to delay full implementation of SB 79 until 2030. At that council meeting, Yaroslavsky introduced a motion to expand development incentives so that the newly permitted zoning would attract construction, saying, "If this doesn't result in housing that gets built, none of this matters."

==== Homelessness ====
In 2023, Yaroslavsky proposed converting a city-owned parking lot at Pico Boulevard and Midvale Avenue into a 33-unit interim housing facility, noting that CD5 had fewer than 100 interim housing beds, none serving the general adult population. The proposal drew significant community opposition, including protests at a public information session attended by Mayor Bass where residents chanted for Yaroslavsky's recall. The City Council nonetheless approved the project unanimously.

In February 2025, the council approved two motions by Yaroslavsky described as the largest expansion of domestic violence services in the city's history. One allocated funding to expand shelter capacity and housing support for survivors; the other directed the LAPD, the City Attorney, and partner agencies to formalize a Domestic Violence Restraining Order Enforcement Task Force. The motions came amid data showing the city had only 567 domestic violence shelter beds, and that more than 41% of unhoused Angelenos had experienced domestic or intimate partner violence.

== Personal life ==
Yaroslavsky is married to David Yaroslavsky, a Los Angeles County Superior Court judge, with the two having three children. She is the daughter-in-law to Zev Yaroslavsky, a former member of the Los Angeles County Board of Supervisors who held the same seat in the City Council from 1975 to 1994.

== Electoral history ==
2022 Los Angeles City Council District 5 election
Primary election
Candidate	Votes	%
Katy Yaroslavsky	28,039	48.97
Sam Yebri	16,998	29.68
Jimmy Biblarz	6,268	10.95
Scott Epstein	5,954	10.40
Total votes	57,259	100.00
General election
Katy Yaroslavsky	50,391	59.69
Sam Yebri	34,028	40.31
Total votes	84,419	100.00
