= Daniel Michael McGarry =

American politician (1842–1903)

Member of the Los Angeles City Council for the 7th ward
- In office December 5, 1890 – December 5, 1892
- Preceded by: J. T. Brown
- Succeeded by: Thomas Strohm

Member of the Los Angeles Common Council for the 5th ward
- In office December 8, 1883 – December 10, 1885

Personal details
- Born: January 20, 1842 Loughgiel, County Antrim, Ireland
- Died: August 4, 1903 (aged 61) Santa Monica, California
- Party: Democratic
- Spouse: Margaret McCaughan (m. 1871)
- Children: 6

Daniel Michael McGarry (January 20, 1842 – July 4, 1903) was a Chicago, Illinois, coal dealer and in the later part of his life a civic leader and businessman in Los Angeles, California, where he was a member of the Los Angeles City Council.

== Biography ==
McGarry was born on January 20, 1842, in Loughgiel, County Antrim, Ireland, and came to the United States in 1865 settling at first in Cleveland, Ohio, where, with a cousin, he "engaged in the fuel business." He returned to Ireland in 1871 to marry Margaret McCaughan and brought her back to Chicago. Their children were Michael Joseph, Daniel Francis, John A., Christina, Mary T., Anna M. (or Annie) and Patrick J.

The family visited Los Angeles in 1881 and, impressed, they decided to move there. McGarry sold his business in Chicago and relocated with his wife and children to Los Angeles later that year.

McGarry died on July 4, 1903, in his Santa Monica, California, summer home. He had been suffering from an affection of the heart. It was noted that McGarry's death came just "a few hours" after he had read of the impending death of his "intimate friend and associate," fellow civic leader John F. Francis.

On July 6, a requiem mass was celebrated at what the Los Angeles Times called "the largest funeral that has taken place at St. Vibiana's Cathedral since the obsequies of the late Stephen M. White." A procession accompanied the casket to First and Alameda streets, where funeral streetcars took it and the mourners to Calvary Cemetery. The newspaper reported that:

when the funeral approached the Sisters' Orphanage on Boyle Heights[, the] bell was tolled and the girls stood with bowed heads and clasped hands, at the roadside, as the funeral passed by. This school had been a special object of charity at the hands of the deceased.

== Vocation ==
In Ireland, after completing his education, McGarry was a teacher, and his first vocation after moving to Cleveland was that of a fuel dealer, in business with a cousin.

When he settled in Chicago with his bride, he established a retail and wholesale coal business, which he sold when he decided to move to California. Once in Los Angeles, McGarry bought a vineyard at 8th and Alameda streets, where he established his home for the next twenty years. He later subdivided and sold that property. He established a real-estate partnership, McGarry & Innes, and became active in the city's development. He was a director of the First National Bank.

== Public service ==
A Democrat, McGarry represented the 5th Ward on the Los Angeles Common Council in 1883–84 and 1884–85. After a city charter was granted by the state, changing the electoral system to provide for a nine-ward Los Angeles City Council, he was elected to represent the newly drawn 7th Ward in 1890–92.

McGarry was a losing candidate in an 1898 election for a Board of Freeholders that was chosen to draft the new charter for Los Angeles.

In 1900 McGarry was a member of a civic group called the "Committee of Fifteen," which had been appointed by a Citizens' Committee of Safety to "unearth municipal corruption." It made its report on November 7 of that year adversely criticizing the Los Angeles Police Department.

== Memberships ==
McGarry was a member of the Newman Club, Los Angeles Pioneers Society, the Elks Lodge, the Knights of Columbus and a Shakespearean society. He was also in the Ancient Order of Hibernians.

== References and notes ==
Access to the Los Angeles Times link may require the use of a library card.
