= John Q. Tufts =

American politician (1840–1902)

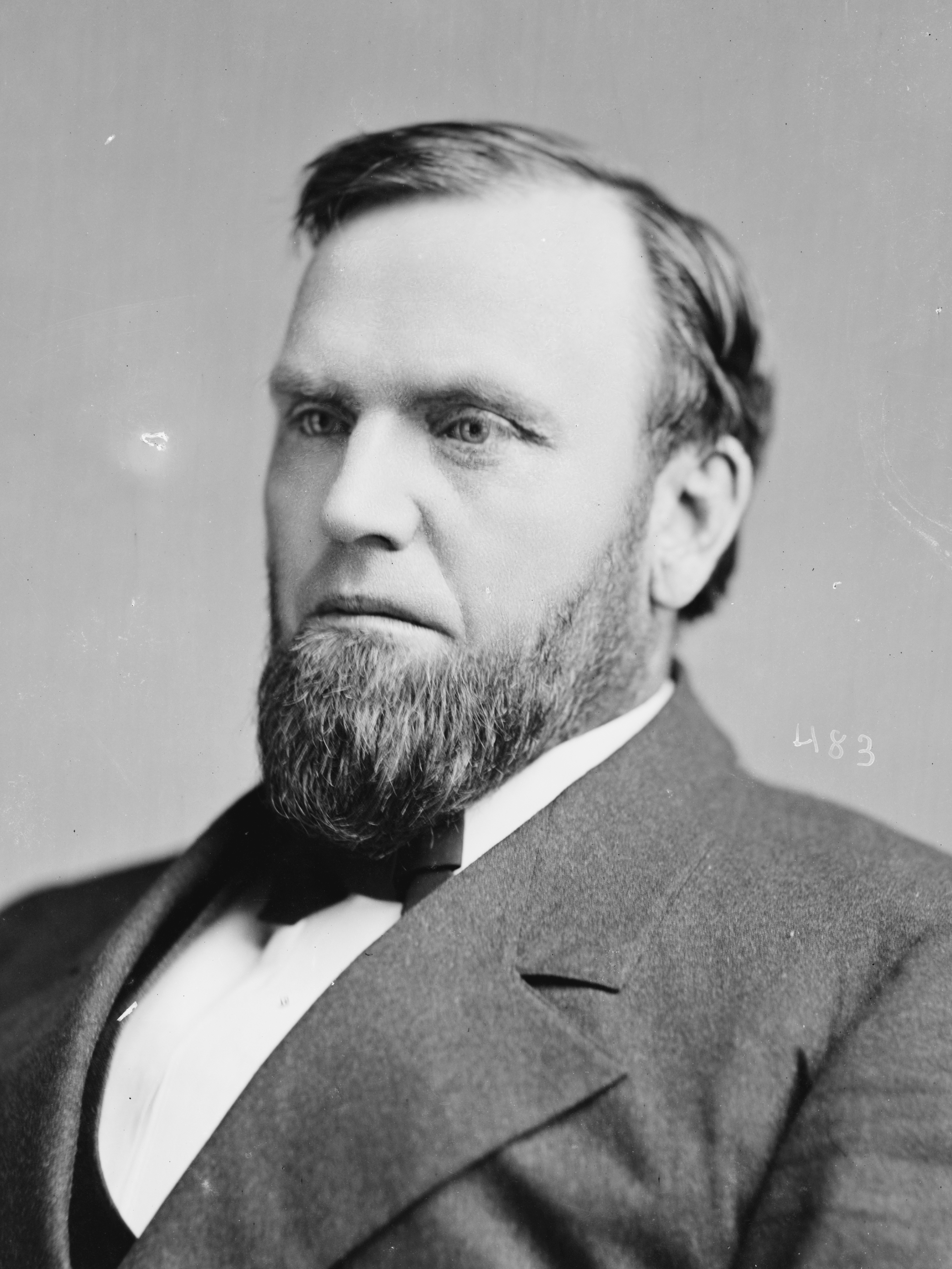

Member of the Los Angeles City Council for the 5th ward
- In office December 5, 1890 – December 12, 1892
- Preceded by: Austin C. Shafer
- Succeeded by: Freeman G. Teed

Member of the U.S. House of Representatives from Iowa's 2nd district
- In office March 4, 1875 – March 3, 1877
- Preceded by: Aylett R. Cotton
- Succeeded by: Hiram Price

Personal details
- Born: July 12, 1840 Aurora, Indiana, U.S.
- Died: September 4, 1902 (aged 62) Los Angeles, California, U.S.
- Party: Republican

John Quincy Adams Tufts (July 12, 1840 – September 4, 1902) was an American Republican politician from Iowa and California. He was founder of a sporting goods company in Los Angeles.

== Personal ==
Tufts was born on July 12, 1840, in Aurora, Indiana, to Servetus (or Servitus) Tufts and Emily (Dudley) Tufts. The family moved to a farm in Muscatine County, Iowa, in 1852. He attended common schools as a child and then Cornell College in Mount Vernon, Iowa. He married Susan Shaw Cook on October 10, 1861. They had eleven children.

Tufts moved to Los Angeles in 1887. He was a member of the Masons and of the Creel Club

On September 4, 1902, he died at his home, 3303 South Grand Avenue, at age 68. He was survived by his wife and ten children, Anna D. Lyon, Emily F. Cass, Martha W. Muir, Edward B. Tufts, John Q. Tufts Jr., Will A. Tufts, Carl R. Tufts and Roy N. Tufts, all of Los Angeles; Maud S. Frick of San Francisco, and Eva S. Sanson of Indian Territory. He was interred in Angelus Cemetery in Central Los Angeles.

== Vocation ==
=== Agriculture ===
In 1858, Tufts moved to Cedar County, Iowa, and was a farmer near Wilton in that county.

=== Iowa ===
Tufts was a member of the Iowa House of Representatives in 1870, to 1875. In his final term he was the chairman of the Railroad Committee of the Iowa House and was considered a strong advocate for railroad regulation.

=== U.S. government ===
In 1874 he was elected as a Republican to represent Iowa's 2nd congressional district in the United States House of Representatives. He did not run for re-election in 1876. He served in Congress from March 4, 1875, to March 3, 1877. He was also a United States Indian Agent in the Union Agency at Muskogee in the Indian Territory (now Oklahoma), from 1879 to 1887.

During his tenure as Indian Commissioner, he organized the first unit of the United States Indian Police in February 1880. In his annual report to the Secretary of the Interior, John Q. Tufts consistently asked to have the number and pay increased for the United States Indian Police. He urged the government to resolve the question of citizenship in the Indian Nation and he supported the freedman's claims to citizenship in the Cherokee Nation. John Q. Tufts also asked that laws be passed to provide imprisonment of intruders who return after being removed for the theft of coal and timber. The intruders were often whites who stole with impunity from Indian lands. In August 1883 Tufts helped to broker peace within the Creek Nation when a faction that was dissatisfied with election results attempted a rebellion.

=== Los Angeles ===
In Los Angeles, he engaged in the real estate business and also founded the Tufts-Lyons Arms Company, a sporting-goods firm. In 1890 he was elected to the City Council from the 5th Ward. He served one term, then ran for mayor on the Republican ticket, losing to Thomas E. Rowan in 1892.

He was opposed in his race for mayor by the Los Angeles Herald, which said of him that he was "openly hostile to a large class of teamsters, hackmen and others" and that he had "also favored a cut in the wages of day laborers in the public employ." The Times, however, endorsed him because of his "recognized standing in the business community."

U.S. House of Representatives
Preceded by Aylett R. Cotton	Member of the U.S. House of Representatives from Iowa's 2nd congressional district March 4, 1875 – March 3, 1877	Succeeded by Hiram Price
Political offices
Preceded by Austin C. Shafer	Member of the Los Angeles City Council from the 5th ward 1890 – 1892	Succeeded by Freeman G. Teed
