= Byron B. Brainard =

American politician

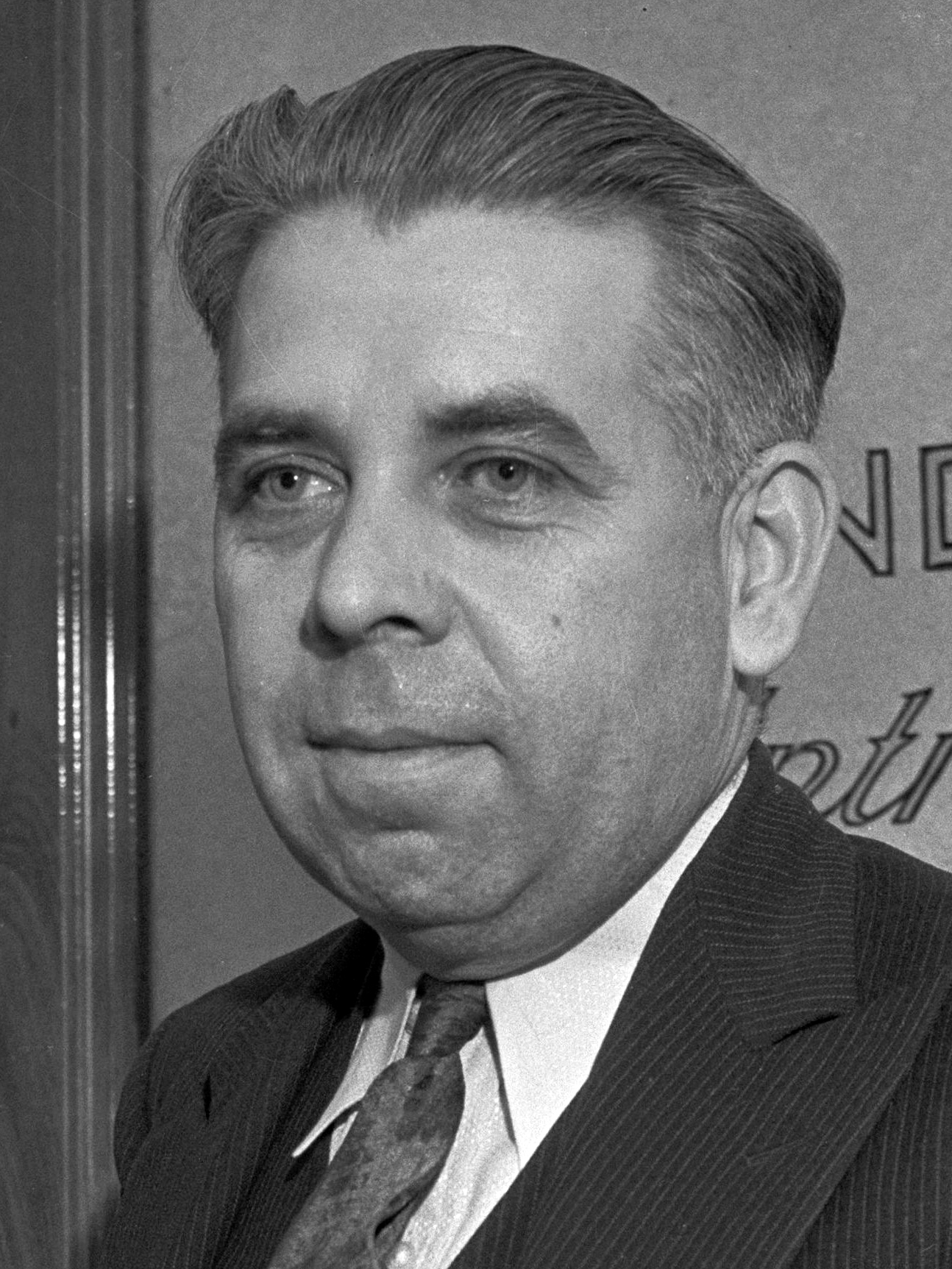
- Brainard in 1935

Member of the Los Angeles City Council from the 5th district
- In office July 1, 1933 – June 30, 1939
- Preceded by: Roy Donley
- Succeeded by: Arthur E. Briggs

Personal details
- Born: April 1, 1894; Topeka, Kansas
- Died: March 19, 1940 (aged 45); Los Angeles, California
- Political party: Republican
- Spouse: Blanche Huyck (m. 1916)
- Children: 1

Byron Bernard Brainard (April 1, 1894 – March 19, 1940) was an electrician, auto mechanic, auto salesman, real estate broker and community newspaper editor who was a Los Angeles City Council member between 1933 and 1939.

== Biography ==
Brainard was born April 1, 1894, in Topeka, Kansas, was brought to Los Angeles in 1899 at the age of five. He left high school to work as a car washer for the Southern Pacific and the Pullman Company but acquired his first piece of real estate through his parents while still a minor. He continued his education through night school and extension courses. He worked up to chief mechanic for an automobile company, then turned to real estate and, before his election to the council in 1933, he edited and published the Southwest News-Press, a community newspaper. He maintained a semiweekly column called "Column Right" while a council member and after.

Brainard was stricken while eating dinner with his wife, Blanche, at home. He could not be revived at Georgia Street Receiving Hospital. Funeral services were conducted at Inglewood Park Cemetery by the Golden Gate Masonic Lodge and the Order of Druids, of which Brainard had been Noble Grand Arch. Besides his wife, he left a son and a daughter.

A month after his death on March 19, 1940, an autopsy report revealed that Brainard had died of choking when a piece of meat lodged in his throat.

== City Council ==
=== Elections ===
Brainard ran for the 5th District seat in 1929 and 1931, each time failing to be nominated in the first round. In 1933, however, he ousted incumbent Roy Donley, and he was reelected in 1935 over the End Poverty in California candidate, Charles W. Dempster. He was reelected in 1937 and 1939, but lost to Arthur E. Briggs in 1941.

=== Highlights of his term ===
- He was one of five Council members on Mayor Fletcher Bowron's "purge list" in advance of the 1939 elections.
- When Mayor Bowron vetoed the surfacing of Amalfi and Warren drives with Warrenite bitulithic pavement on the grounds that the substance was part of a "patent paving racket" not worth the additional cost, Brainard called the veto message "the most asinine statement I ever heard given out by any man in public office."
- He and John W. Baumgartner obtained the original allocation of US$175,000 from the state to begin the project that opened 10th Street and turned it into Olympic Boulevard without having to assess local property owners for the improvements.
- In May 1939 he cast the only vote against Bowron's request for an additional $2,000 for the police secret service fund.

Preceded by Roy Donley	Los Angeles City Council; 5th District; 1933–39	Succeeded by Arthur E. Briggs
