= Ira J. McDonald =

American politician

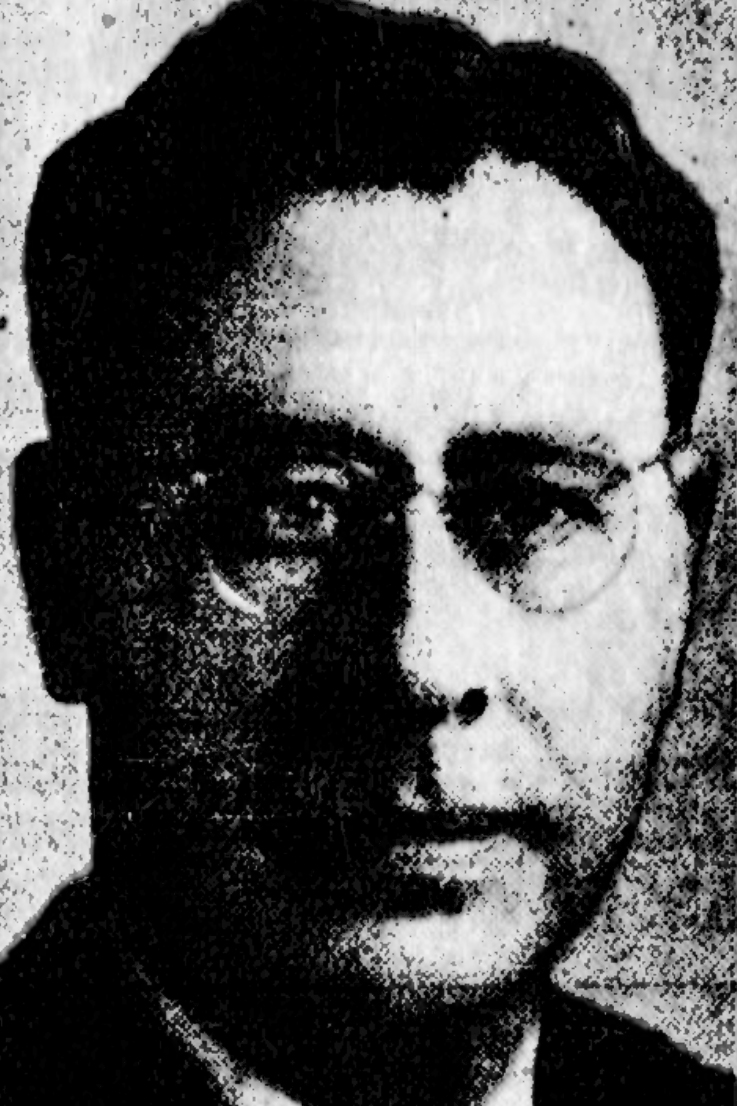
- McDonald in 1943

Member of the Los Angeles City Council from the 5th district
- In office July 1, 1941 – June 30, 1945
- Preceded by: Arthur E. Briggs
- Succeeded by: George P. Cronk

Personal details
- Born: May 1, 1895; Craig, Nebraska, U.S.
- Died: December 6, 1964 (aged 69); Los Angeles, California, U.S.
- Political party: Democratic
- Spouse: Helen M. Warga (m. 1923)
- Children: 1

Ira J. McDonald (May 1, 1895 – December 6, 1964) was a Downey, California, attorney and member of the Los Angeles City Council between 1941 and 1945.

== Biography ==
McDonald was born May 1, 1895, in Craig, Nebraska, the son of John S. McDonald and Amanda B. Hildreth, both of Jamestown, Tennessee. He was married to Helen M. Warga of Havelock, Nebraska, on March 28, 1923. They had one son, Paul Ira McDonald. While in Los Angeles they lived at 2063 South Oxford Street, east of South Western Avenue. He was a Presbyterian, a Democrat and a Mason.

McDonald went to Nebraska State Teachers College and taught school for 3 1/2 years. He was also the secretary of a building and loan association for four years. "In 1917 he went overseas with the 6th Marines and served with that outfit in all its major engagements." He received his law degree from the University of Nebraska College of Law and was elected treasurer of his home town, Havelock, Nebraska. He moved to California and began practicing there in 1928 or 1929.

He died on December 6, 1964.

== Public service ==
=== Elections ===
In 1941 Los Angeles City Council District 5 was bounded on the north by Wilshire Boulevard, on the east by Western or Vermont, on the south by Exposition Boulevard and on the west by Arlington, Crenshaw and minor streets.

McDonald ran against incumbent 5th District City Councilman Arthur E. Briggs in 1941 and triumphed in the final election. Two years later, he easily won in the primary. In 1945 he left his council job and ran for mayor; he came in fourth in the primary vote, after Fletcher Bowron, first; Clifford Clinton, second, and Roger Jessup, third.

He also ran unsuccessfully for state controller in 1946 and for Municipal Judge, Office No. 1, in 1947.

After he moved to Downey, California, where he resumed the practice of law and became a board member in the Chamber of Commerce, he ran for the City Council there in 1954.

=== Los Angeles City Council ===
As a City Council member, McDonald took these positions:

Reward, 1941. Only he and fellow Councilman Charles A. Allen voted for a motion granting a citizen, Warren J. Hall, a reward of $25 for the arrest and conviction of another man who turned in a false fire alarm. The other council members thought it would set a bad precedent and turned it down.

Harby, 1941. After much debate, the council adopted a motion offered by McDonald that effectively put an "official business" stamp on an unauthorized trip that Councilman Harold Harby had taken in a city automobile to Montana. Harby was later indicted and removed from office for the misadventure.

Slapping, 1942. McDonald struck fellow Councilman Carl C. Rasmussen in the face over a dispute about raising city wages. They shook hands later in the same December 1942 meeting, but McDonald nevertheless issued a press statement saying that:

Councilman Rasmussen is well known for bringing personalities into an argument and making insulting remarks. A few days ago he called me a vile and profane name. Today he again endeavored to make insulting remarks to me. I thought it time to show my disapproval and took direct action which any red-blooded man would do.

Politics, 1944. He accused Mayor Fletcher Bowron's administration of developing a "political slush fund" in finances for the city's Civilian Defense Council.

Airport, 1945. He and Councilman John W. Baumgartner opposed issuance of $12.5 million in bonds to improve Los Angeles Airport on the grounds that "airlines, like railroads, should pay for their terminals instead of having a terminal financed by the taxpayers."

Preceded by Arthur E. Briggs	Los Angeles City Council; 5th District; 1941–44	Succeeded by George P. Cronk
