= Rosalind Wiener Wyman =

American politician (1930–2022)

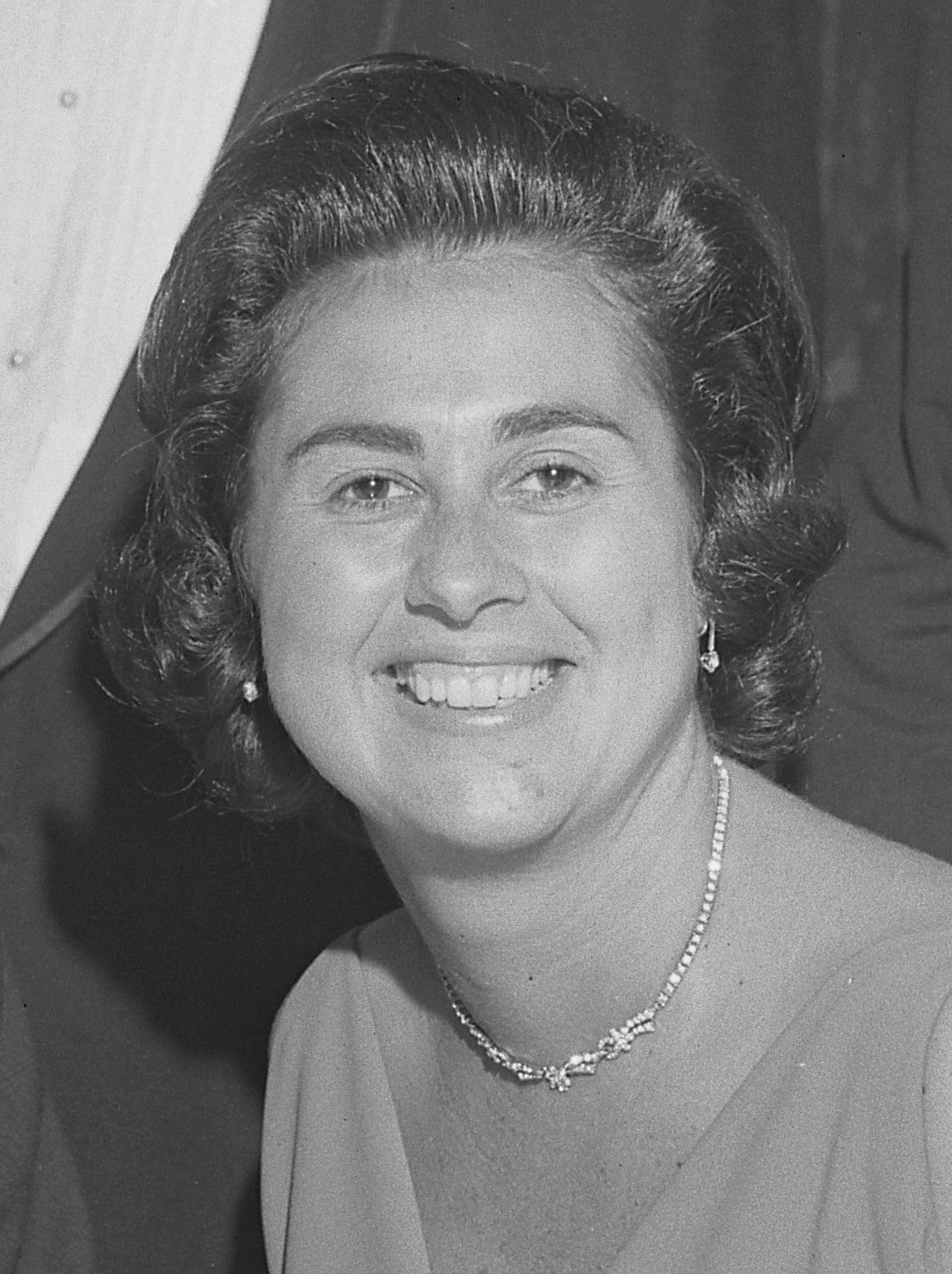
- Wyman in 1964

Chair of the 1984 Democratic National Convention
- In office July 16, 1984 – July 19, 1984

Member of the Los Angeles City Council from District 5
- In office 1953–1965
- Preceded by: George P. Cronk
- Succeeded by: Edmund D. Edelman

Personal details
- Born: Rosalind Wiener; October 4, 1930 Los Angeles, California, U.S.
- Died: October 26, 2022 (aged 92) Los Angeles, California, U.S.
- Party: Democratic
- Spouse: Eugene L. Wyman (m. 1954; died 1973)
- Children: 3
- Education: University of Southern California (BS)

Rosalind Wiener Wyman (October 4, 1930 – October 26, 2022) was an American politician, Los Angeles City Councilmember, and California Democratic political figure who, at 22 years old, was the youngest person ever elected to the Los Angeles City Council, and only the second woman to serve there. Her City Council tenure ran 12 years, representing the city's Fifth District. Wyman was highly influential in bringing the Brooklyn Dodgers from New York to Chavez Ravine, Los Angeles. She helped lead the successful campaigns of U.S. Senator Dianne Feinstein (D-Calif.) and in 2019, was reported to be California's oldest DNC delegate.

She also served on the UNESCO Commission and sat on executive boards ranging from the National Endowment for the Arts to the Los Angeles County Arts Commission to the American Friends of the Hebrew University Board; she also acted as chairperson for a variety of entities, including the Community Relations Committee of the Los Angeles Jewish Community Council and the National Congressional Committee Dinner. She was known for having been a vigorous proponent of multi-faith religious tolerance efforts.

== Biography ==
Rosalind Wiener was born October 4, 1930, in Los Angeles to Oscar and Sarah (née Selten) Wiener. Her father was a Russian immigrant who came to the country as a stowaway; after arriving, he put himself through pharmacy school. Her Chicago-born mother became a pharmacist as well, despite never pursuing higher education, so she could co-run the drugstore the family had at 9th Street and Western Avenue (in today's Koreatown), which included a 22-seat lunch counter. Her mother had also worked as a volunteer at the juvenile hall in Los Angeles, where a room was named in her honor. She also served as a precinct captain for Franklin Delano Roosevelt's first presidential campaign. Rosalind learned how to add by helping work her parents' cash register and serving ice cream to patrons.

Wiener Wyman consistently ran for office in grade school, earning a position while at Los Angeles High School. One of her early political inspirations was Congresswoman Helen Gahagan Douglas, and while still in high school, she chose to do a report on her. Rosalind graduated in 1948, subsequently attending the University of Southern California. During this time, she was able to seek out Gahagan Douglas and volunteer on her Senate campaign. She graduated from USC in 1952 with a Bachelor of Science degree in public administration. After college, she gained employment as a recreation director and made plans to go to law school but before that could happen, she deferred enrollment to campaign for Adlai Stevenson, and was subsequently elected to the City Council in 1953.

Wiener Wyman married attorney Eugene Wyman in 1954, and they had three children: Betty Lynn, Robert, and Brad. The family were Conservative Jews. Eugene Wyman, who was also influential in national Democratic politics, died of a heart attack in January 1973.

Wiener Wyman died on the evening of October 26, 2022, at her home in Bel Air. She was 92 years old.

== City Council ==
=== Elections ===
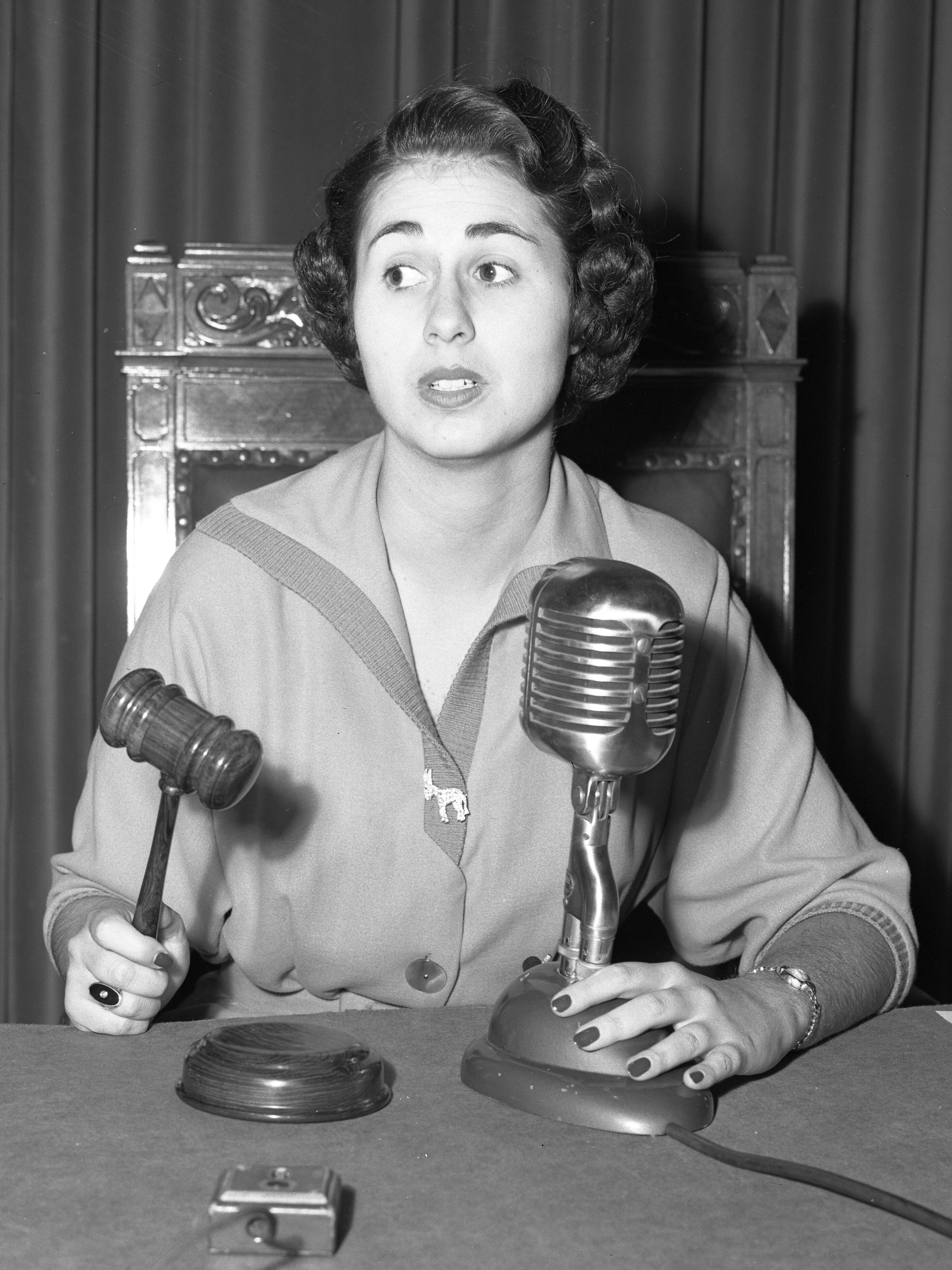
Wyman at the council table in 1953.

In 1953, Rosalind Wiener campaigned in the 5th District to succeed Councilman George P. Cronk, with the aid of a swarm of University of Southern California students, and she "pulled a surprise" to finish first in the primary election, ahead of public accountant Elmer Marshrey. In the final, she won just 52% of the vote and took her seat for a four-year term as the youngest council member ever elected and only the second woman—the first having been Estelle Lawton Lindsey in 1915.

She was reelected in the primaries in 1957 and 1961. She was soundly beaten, though, by Edmund D. Edelman in her fourth council campaign of 1965. One writer opined that it was Wyman's stand on the council to turn over Chavez Ravine to the Dodgers, and the resulting expulsion of displaced residents, most of them Mexican-Americans, that was "a major—if not decisive— reason" for her loss.

Another said it was "a bitter battle with Mayor Sam Yorty" that "brought about her defeat." She had become a vocal critic of Yorty, to the extent that a columnist wrote, 'their vendetta has replaced the La Brea Tar Pits as one of our major tourist attractions.' "

=== 1975 Los Angeles City Council election ===
In 1975, after she was widowed, she campaigned to win back her old seat, "but the race turned ugly when Wyman was attacked [...] as an out-of-touch imperialist, more impressed with her national endorsements than with local issues." Wyman finished third, after Fran Savitch (Mayor Bradley's choice) and Zev Yaroslavsky, the eventual winner.

=== City Council highlights ===
The first resolution Wyman introduced in the council a week after she was seated in 1953 called on the Los Angeles Memorial Coliseum Commission to permit the local American Legion to stage a baseball game in the Coliseum as a demonstration that the venue would be "a proper place to stage major league baseball." In 1958 she was named the City Council's first representative on the Coliseum Commission as a result of a referendum vote by citizens that the council should be represented along with the city Recreation and Parks Department, the county Board of Supervisors, and the state's 6th Agricultural District. At that time the Dodgers were preparing the stadium to use as a temporary field before Chavez Ravine was ready.

During her tenure, Wyman worked to ban horror comics from public sale in drugstores and "other places frequented by children". She also urged the abolition of commissions with any authority over departments and installing "appeal and advisory boards" in their place.

Wyman was chosen "Woman of the Year" for 1958 by the Los Angeles Times. By the end of her third term, Wyman had emerged as enough of a leader on the council that she was elected president pro tem.

== Post-council ==
Wyman remained attached to the Dodgers and purchased eight season tickets directly through owner Walter O'Malley, paid for by her husband's law firm. After he died, she had to sue the firm to get them back.

In 1973, Wyman served as Chairperson of the National Congressional Committee Dinner. In 1974, she was named to head fundraising for the Democratic Congressional campaigns, and she served as chair and chief executive officer of the 1984 Democratic National Convention in San Francisco which nominated Geraldine Ferraro for Vice-President of the United States, the first woman named as a major party candidate at that level. She co-chaired the senatorial campaigns of Dianne Feinstein. She was employed as motion-picture executive and was a consultant to Los Angeles Mayor Tom Bradley.

In 1988 and 1989, Wyman served as chair of the benefit Singers Salute the Songwriters, with funds going to the Betty Clooney Foundation for Brain Injuries. In January 2015, she was appointed to serve on the Los Angeles County Arts Commission.

As of 2019, Wyman was California's oldest Democratic National Convention delegate.

== Awards, honors and profiles ==
- Roz Wyman Collectors' Bobblehead (2019)
- USC Alumna profile, (Spring 2018)
- 89.3 KPCC profile, (March 2018)
- 90.9 WBUR profile, (April 11, 2015)
- May 8 declared Roz Wyman Day by Major League Baseball and the Dodgers organization, (2013–present)
- First-ever recipient of Los Angeles Magazine's Game Changer Hall of Fame Award
- City of Los Angeles and the Dodgers Dream Foundation name Little League field in Cheviot Hills as Roz Wyman Diamond, (July 22, 2003)
- Honored with Dianne Feinstein speech before the United States Senate, (July 8, 2003)
- Los Angeles Times profile, (August 13, 2000)
- USC Alumni Award, (1964)
- "Mr. And Mrs. American Citizen for the Year 1964," bestowed by Los Angeles B'nai B'rith and California Governor Edmund G. (Pat) Brown
- Los Angeles Times "Woman of the Year" (1958)

== In media ==
- Wyman appears in Dodgers Stories: 6 Decades in L.A., a 2019 six-part Dodgers documentary.
- Wyman appears in a Beverly Hills View interview, discussing her political career.

Preceded by George P. Cronk	Los Angeles City Council; 5th District; 1953–1966	Succeeded by Edmund D. Edelman
