= John W. Baumgartner =

American politician

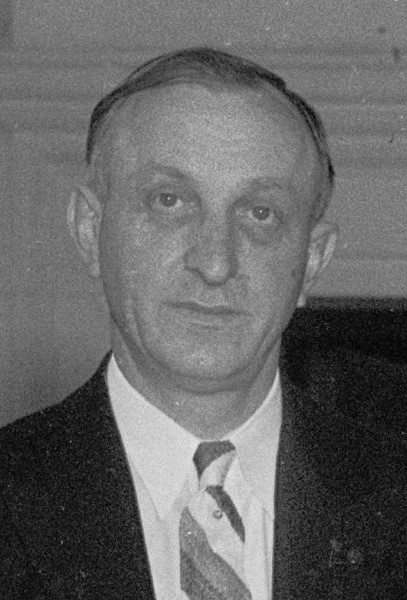
- Baumgartner in 1935

Member of the Los Angeles City Council from the 12th district
- In office July 1, 1933 – June 30, 1945
- Preceded by: James T. Carroll
- Succeeded by: Ed J. Davenport

Personal details
- Born: May 17, 1890 Los Angeles, California, U.S
- Died: November 9, 1973 (aged 83) Los Angeles, California, U.S.
- Party: Democratic
- Children: 1

John Walter Baumgartner (May 17, 1890 – November 9, 1973) was an American civil engineer who was a member of the Los Angeles, California, City Council from 1933 to 1945.

== Biography ==
Baumgartner was born on May 17, 1890, on a ranch in Los Angeles located at what later became the intersection of Beverly and Rampart boulevards. He was educated in Los Angeles public schools and graduated from St. Vincent's College, now Loyola University. He was a civil engineer for fifteen years. Married since 1914, he was the father of one daughter, Helen (Mrs. Kenneth Kritser). He lived at 1010 South Burlington Avenue.

He was an elector pledged to the Democratic slate in 1936. He was a Roman Catholic.

== City service ==
Baumgartner was appointed to the Water and Power Commission in 1932, and he was soon chosen president of the body. He was elected to the 12th Councilmanic District in 1933 and reelected every two years thereafter until he retired in 1945. He was the End Poverty in California candidate in 1935.

In 1934 he opposed the policy of allowing the Automobile Club of Southern California to post directional signs for motorists on city streets because "the club is in the insurance business." City purchasing agent Holm said that the club furnished the signs for free and maintained 21,000 of them at no expense to the city. He and Councilman Byron B. Brainard obtained the original allocation of $175,000 from the state in the 1930s to begin the project that opened 10th Street and turned it into Olympic Boulevard without having to assess local property owners for the improvements. He was appointed to a committee of five council members in May 1940 to call on Mayor Fletcher Bowron to complain about "persistent and erroneous" remarks the mayor made about the council in his radio addresses.

In summer 1940 he began a campaign against pinball and other recreational machines, and in October of that year submitted a motion to "prohibit possession, operation or playing of so-called marble games known as bali ball and miniature bowling." He also asked "consideration of a ban on the playing of those games by the use of any spherical object other than a marble." In 1943 he and three other council members unsuccessfully opposed granting a permit to Seaboard Oil Company for slant oil drilling under Elysian Park from a site near Riverside Drive. He and Councilman Ira J. McDonald opposed issuance of $12.5 million in bonds in 1945 to improve Los Angeles Airport on the grounds that "airlines, like railroads, should pay for their terminals instead of having a terminal financed by the taxpayers."

Preceded by James T. Carroll	Los Angeles City Council; 12th district 1933–45	Succeeded by Ed J. Davenport
