= Thomas W. Williams (politician) =

American politician

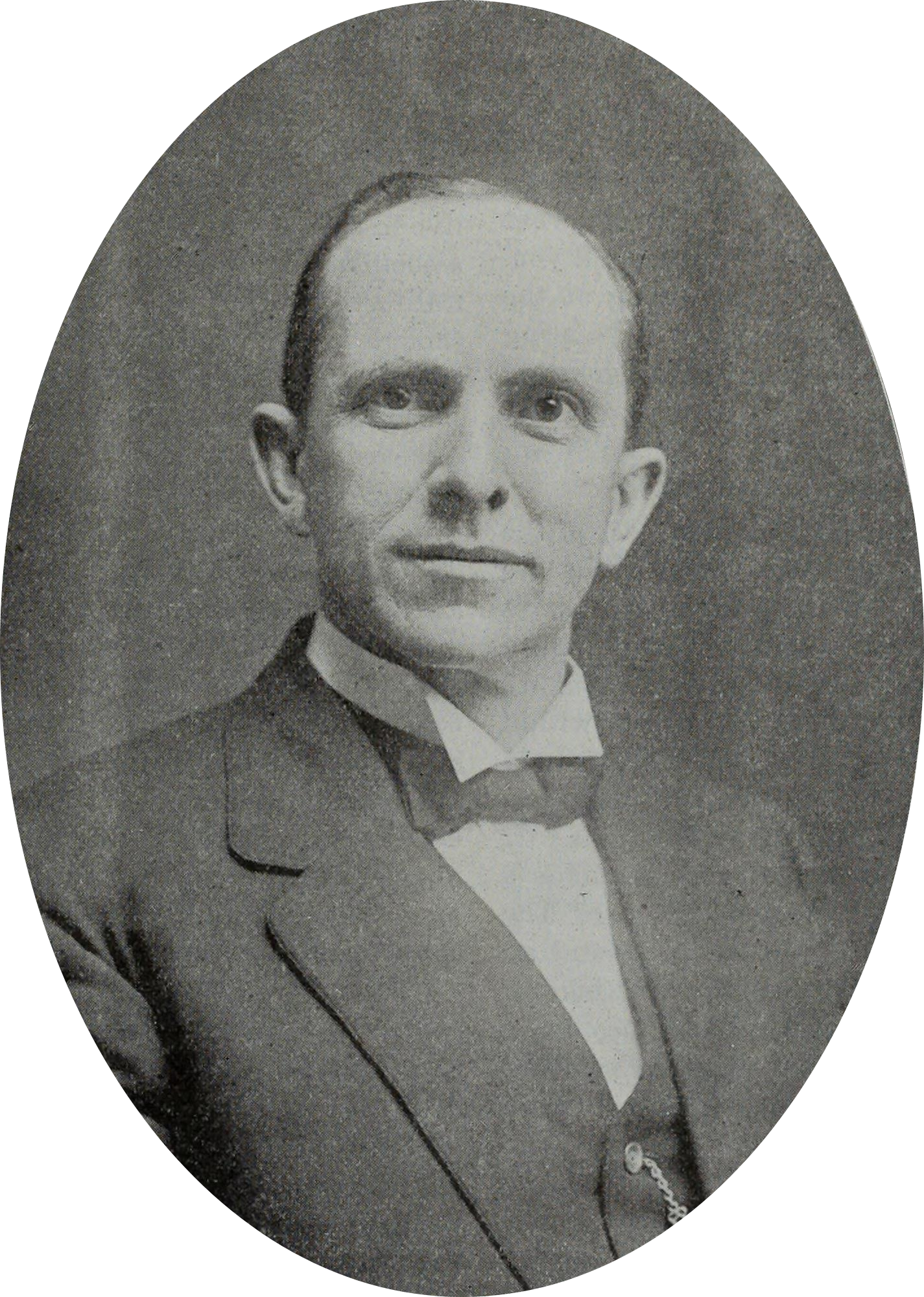
- Williams c. 1914

Member of the Los Angeles City Council from the 12th district
- In office July 1, 1929 – April 13, 1931
- Preceded by: Douglas Eads Foster
- Succeeded by: Thomas F. Ford

Personal details
- Born: 1867 Utah, U.S.
- Died: 1931 (aged 63–64) Los Angeles, California, U.S.
- Party: Socialist
- Spouse: Addie May Cady (m. 1892)
- Children: 6

Thomas W. Williams (ca. 1867–1931) was a former coal miner, school principal and church minister who was a member of the Los Angeles, California, City Council between 1929 and 1931. He was the first councilman elected under the 1925 city charter to die in office.

== Background ==
Williams was born around 1867 in Utah and began work in a coal mine when he was "little more than 8, to support his mother, his father having died when he was a baby." He attended grammar and high schools at night and when he was 18 he became principal of a school in Lucas, Iowa. He became a minister of the Reorganized Church of Jesus Christ of Latter-Day Saints, preached and traveled through Europe as a missionary.

He was married in Pittsburgh, Pennsylvania, at age 25 to Addie May Cady. They had six children. After the Williamses moved to Los Angeles, they took up residence in the Silver Lake district.

== Political activity ==
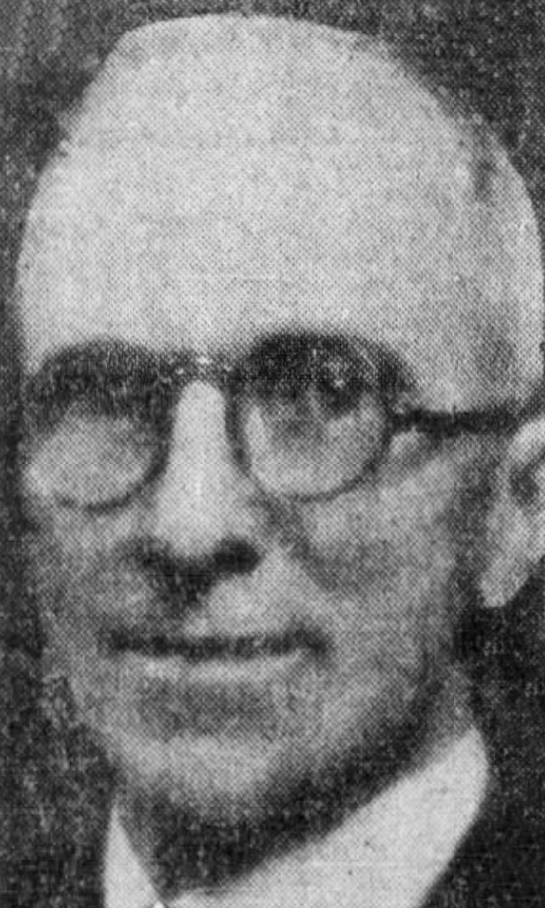
Williams c. 1931

Williams's first run for the City Council was in 1911, when he came in seventeenth in a field of eighteen at-large candidates, with the highest nine being elected.

In 1914 he was the California State Secretary for the Socialist Party of America and was speaking on behalf of an eight-hour day proposal on the California ballot. He appeared before a group of farmers in Orange County and told them that "if the law would injure California's prosperity the Socialists would not want to see it passed."

As a Socialist, he was opposed to the direct-primary method of nominating candidates for public office. He said in 1915 that

The direct primary law permits every vice it is supposed to correct. . . . It relieves employers the necessity of hiring detectives to learn the political affiliation of employees. It makes perjurers of thousands, who register contrary to their convictions, in order to save their jobs.

In the 1929 municipal election he ousted incumbent Douglas Eads Foster.

== Death and aftermath ==
Williams died in Glendale on April 11, 1931, after a cerebral hemorrhage, leaving his widow and four children, Ward Williams, Wallace R. Williams, Ruth Funk and Helen Livingston. Presbyterian services were followed by cremation.

Williams was the first City Council member to die in office after adoption of the new city charter in 1925—just a few weeks shy of the May 1931 election, in which Williams was not a candidate. Although his wife, Addie Williams, was proposed as an interim council member, the City Council voted the idea down, 9–6, and the seat was left vacant until July 1, when the municipal election winner—Thomas Francis Ford—was installed.

Preceded by Douglas Eads Foster	Los Angeles City Council; 12th district 1929–1931	Succeeded by Thomas Francis Ford
