= Roy Donley =

American politician

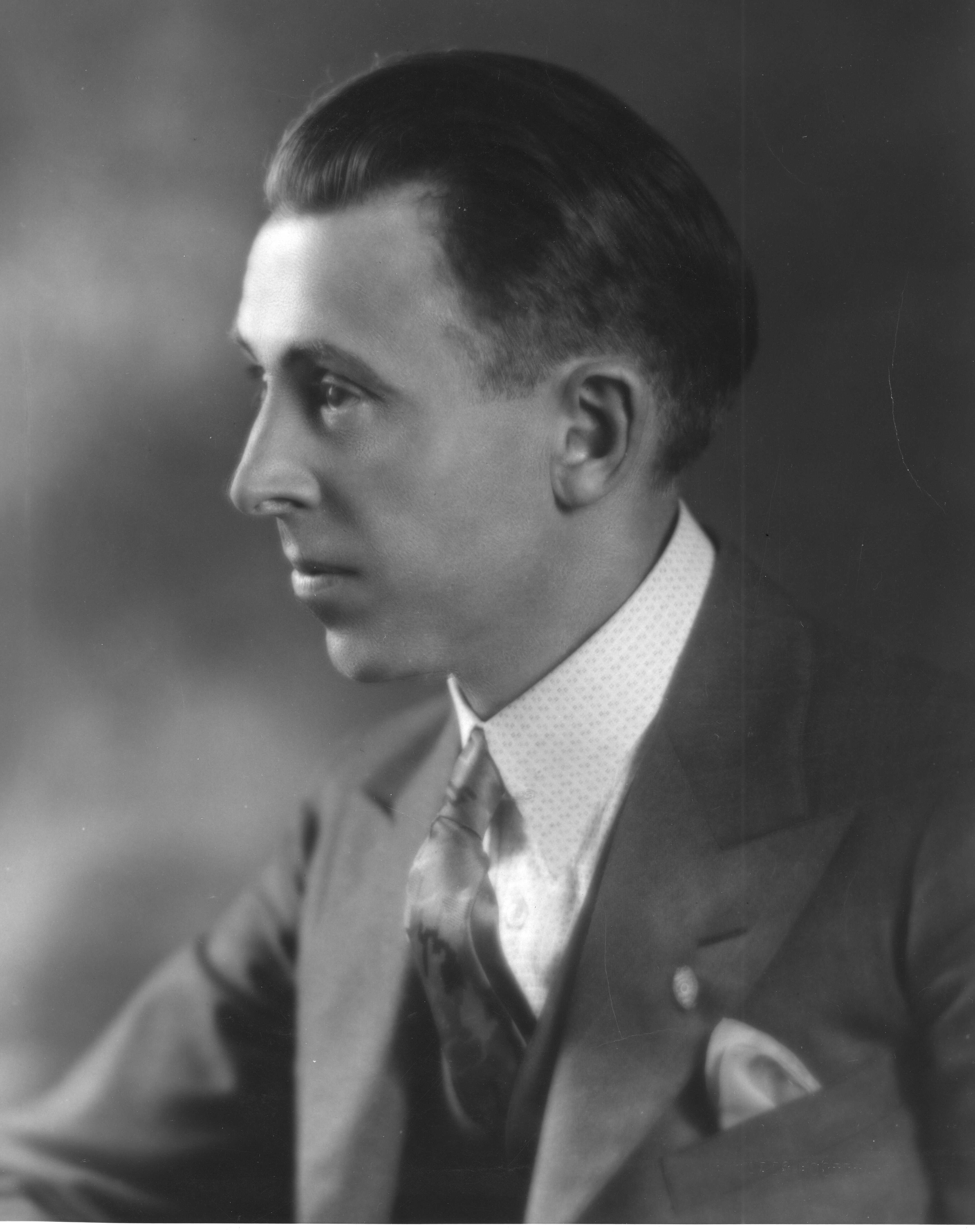
- Donley in 1923

Member of the Los Angeles City Council from the 5th district
- In office July 1, 1931 – June 30, 1933
- Preceded by: Virgil A. Martin
- Succeeded by: Byron B. Brainard

Personal details
- Born: January 15, 1885; Kenosha, Wisconsin
- Died: September 24, 1939 (aged 54); Los Angeles, California
- Political party: Democratic; Independent

Roy Laurence Donley (January 15, 1885 – September 24, 1939) was a businessman who became a member of the Berkeley, California, Board of Park Commissioners and then the Los Angeles City Council, from 1931 to 1933.

== Biography ==
Donley was born January 15, 1885, in Kenosha, Wisconsin, the son of William J. Donley and Catherine Weller. He attended public schools in that city and in 1903, at the age of 18, he began working in the rawhide division of N.R. Allen Sons Company of Kenosha, where he remained for four years.

He moved to San Francisco in 1907 and established a hide and skin brokerage. He became interested in civic affairs and was a member of the Berkeley, California, Board of Park Commissioners. In 1920 he transferred his business to Los Angeles. After he left the City Council, he joined the office of the Los Angeles city controller and then became deputy United States Internal Revenue collector.

Donley was married on September 14, 1910, to Sophia Ann Wenzler of Seattle, Washington. They had two children, John Robert and Evelyn Elizabeth.

A Roman Catholic, he was a member of the Jonathan Club and considered himself independent in politics.

Donley died of an apoplectic stroke in his home, 3516 West 25t Street on September 24, 1939, at the age of fifty-four. Requiem mass was at St. Paul's Cathedral, and interment followed at Calvary Cemetery, East Los Angeles.

== City Council ==
=== Elections ===
In 1931, Donley ran for election in Los Angeles City Council District 5 against the incumbent, Virgil A. Martin and six other candidates, including newspaper editor Byron B. Brainard. Martin took first place in the primary with 2,954 votes, but the decision for second place was so close that a recount was ordered, and Donley edged Brainard by 1,766 to 1,745. In the runoff, Donley was elected, with 5,671 votes against Martin's 5,510.

In 1933, Donley and Brainard were nominated over Martin in the primary, but Brainard won the runoff with 13,163 votes to Donley's 10,499.

The next year, Donley ran for the Democratic nomination for Congress in the district held by Republican William I. Traeger but lost.

Donley again tackled Brainard in 1937, with the support of a number of progressive groups, but he lost in the primary election, with 3,591 votes to Brainard's 9,683.

=== Highlights ===
==== Trial ====
In 1934 he and former City Council Member James Stuart McKnight were tried on charges of agreeing to accept a $10,000 bribe to influence their votes on a city garbage contract while they were on the council. Both were acquitted.

==== Other ====
Irish. Donley voiced his suspicion during a council meeting that the Board of Public Works was discriminating against men of Irish descent in placement for jobs. "Can't a man with a fine old Irish name of O'Connor get a job working for the city?" he asked. The matter was referred to a committee.

Notability. The councilman made two proposals that brought him a measure of notability: He suggested that each council member be allowed to appoint an assistant chief of police in his district and that the councilmen also be given control over the issuance of beer licenses in his district.

Depression. In the depth of the Great Depression, Donley urged that new taxes be levied on such things as gasoline, theaters, wrestling matches, dances, checks drawn on Los Angeles banks, soft drinks, cosmetics and tobacco to provide a fund to get the city through the winter.

Racial restrictions. Donley was one of the eight council members who in July 1931 voted against appealing a judge's decision ordering an end to racial restrictions in city-operated swimming pools, thus ending the practice. Six council members wanted to continue the legal fight. The pools had previously been restricted by race to certain days or hours.

Police. He urged that a compulsory school for police officers be abolished, stating that Police Chief Roy E. Steckel exceeded his authority in establishing it.

Olympic Boulevard. Donley was a staunch opponent of opening and widening 10th Street, which later became Olympic Boulevard, and he submitted an unsuccessful resolution to kill the project.

Preceded by Virgil A. Martin	Los Angeles City Council; 5th District; 1931–33	Succeeded by Byron B. Brainard
