= Virgil A. Martin =

American politician and businessman

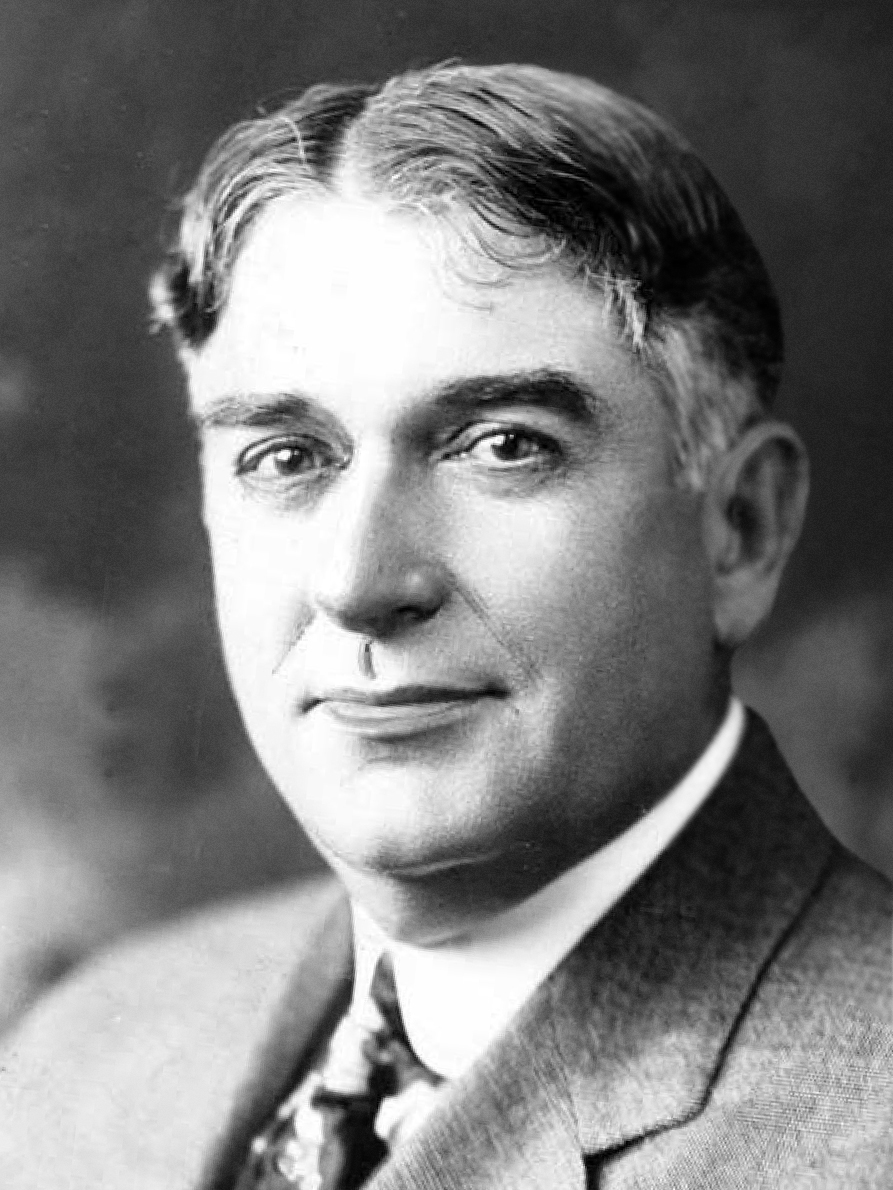
- Martin in 1927

Member of the Los Angeles City Council from the 5th district
- In office July 1, 1927 – June 30, 1931
- Preceded by: Robert Stewart Sparks
- Succeeded by: Roy Donley

Personal details
- Born: October 15, 1874 Tecumseh, Nebraska
- Died: January 9, 1941 (aged 66) Los Angeles, California
- Party: Republican
- Spouse: Lilly F. Ward (m. 1891)

Virgil A. Martin (October 15, 1874 – January 9, 1941) was a business executive and member of the Los Angeles City Council between 1927 and 1931.

== Biography ==
Martin was born October 15, 1874, in Tecumseh, Nebraska, the son of Judson W. Martin and Ennis C. Smith. He was taken to Troy, New York, when he was one year old, where he attended elementary, high school and Troy College, from which he earned an engineering degree in 1891. He was married to Lilly F. Ward of Boston, Massachusetts, that same year. He moved to Los Angeles in 1906 as a representative of the Boston Woven Hose and Rubber Company. Later he was a mechanical engineer, sales engineer and then district manager of the B. F. Goodrich Company. He was in charge of government relations for the company during World War I, including overseeing its balloon schools and shipyards. He left Goodrich in 1925.

He joined the West Adams Methodist Episcopal Church when he moved to Los Angeles. After his retirement, Martin was chairman of the board of the Union Rescue Mission. He died of a heart attack January 9, 1941, in his home at 2934 S. Hobart Boulevard, between West Adams and West Jefferson Boulevards and was survived by his wife and a sister, Gertrude Martin.

== Public service ==
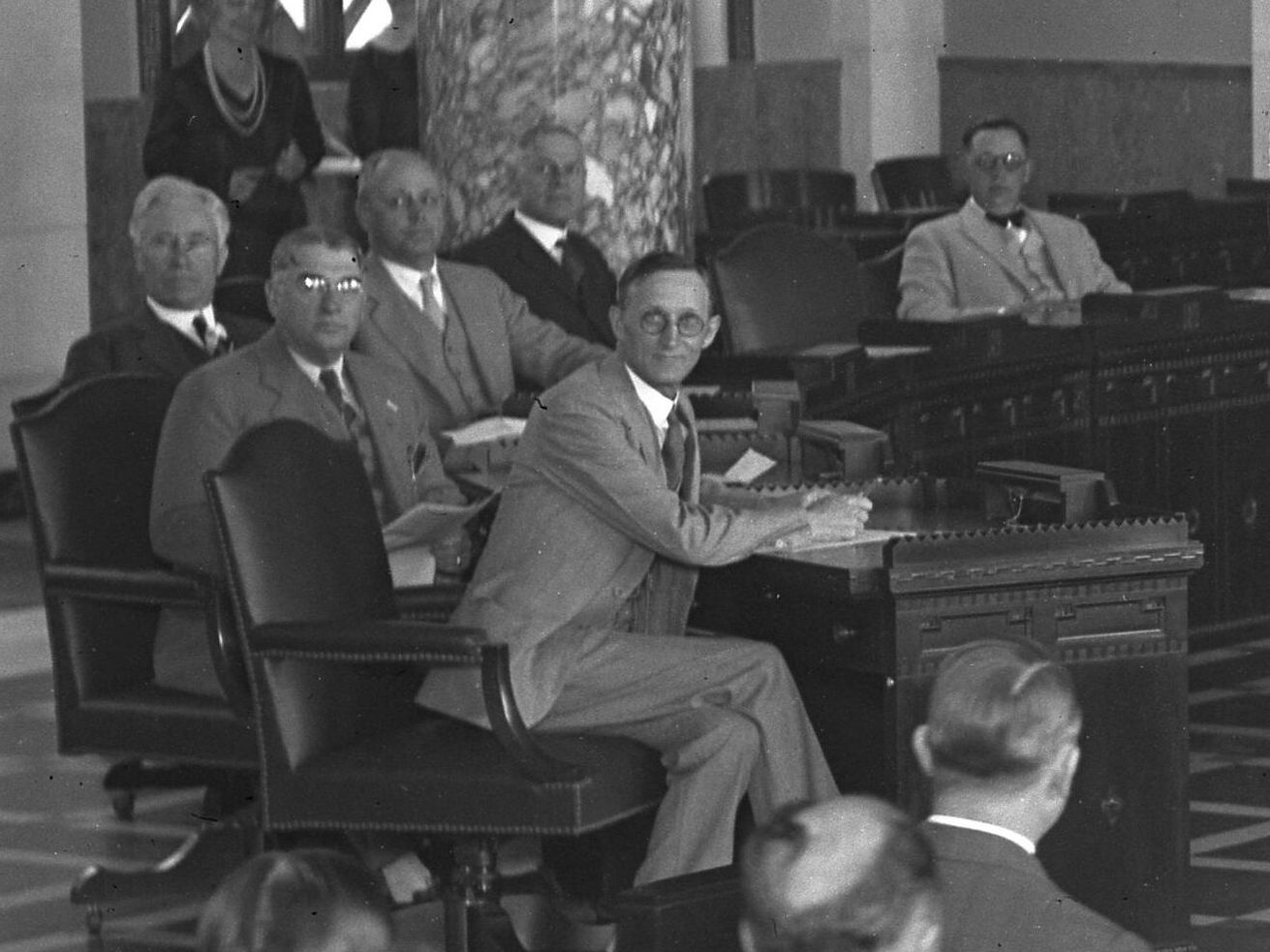
Martin (second from left) in the Los Angeles City Council in 1928.

Martin ran for the 5th District City Council seat in 1927 as an anti-Cryer candidate and trounced the incumbent, Robert Stewart Sparks, by a vote of 7,843 to 2,889. He was reelected in 1929 over S. DeVier Ely but lost in 1931 to Roy L. Donley.

By November 1930, Martin was "generally recognized as spokesman for Mayor [John C.] Porter in the Council chambers."

Martin also was a chairman of the Police and Fire commissions and a member of the Public Works and Harbor commissions.

In January 1930, Martin and seven other council members who had voted in favor of granting a rock-crushing permit in the Santa Monica Mountains were unsuccessfully targeted for recall on the grounds that the eight

have conspired with . . . Alphonzo Bell, Samuel Traylor and Chapin A. Day, all multi-millionaires, to grant this group a special spot zoning permit to crush and ship . . . from the high-class residential section of Santa Monica, limestone and rock for cement.

Preceded by Robert Stewart Sparks	Los Angeles City Council; 5th District; 1927–31	Succeeded by Roy Donley
