= A. J. Barnes =

American politician

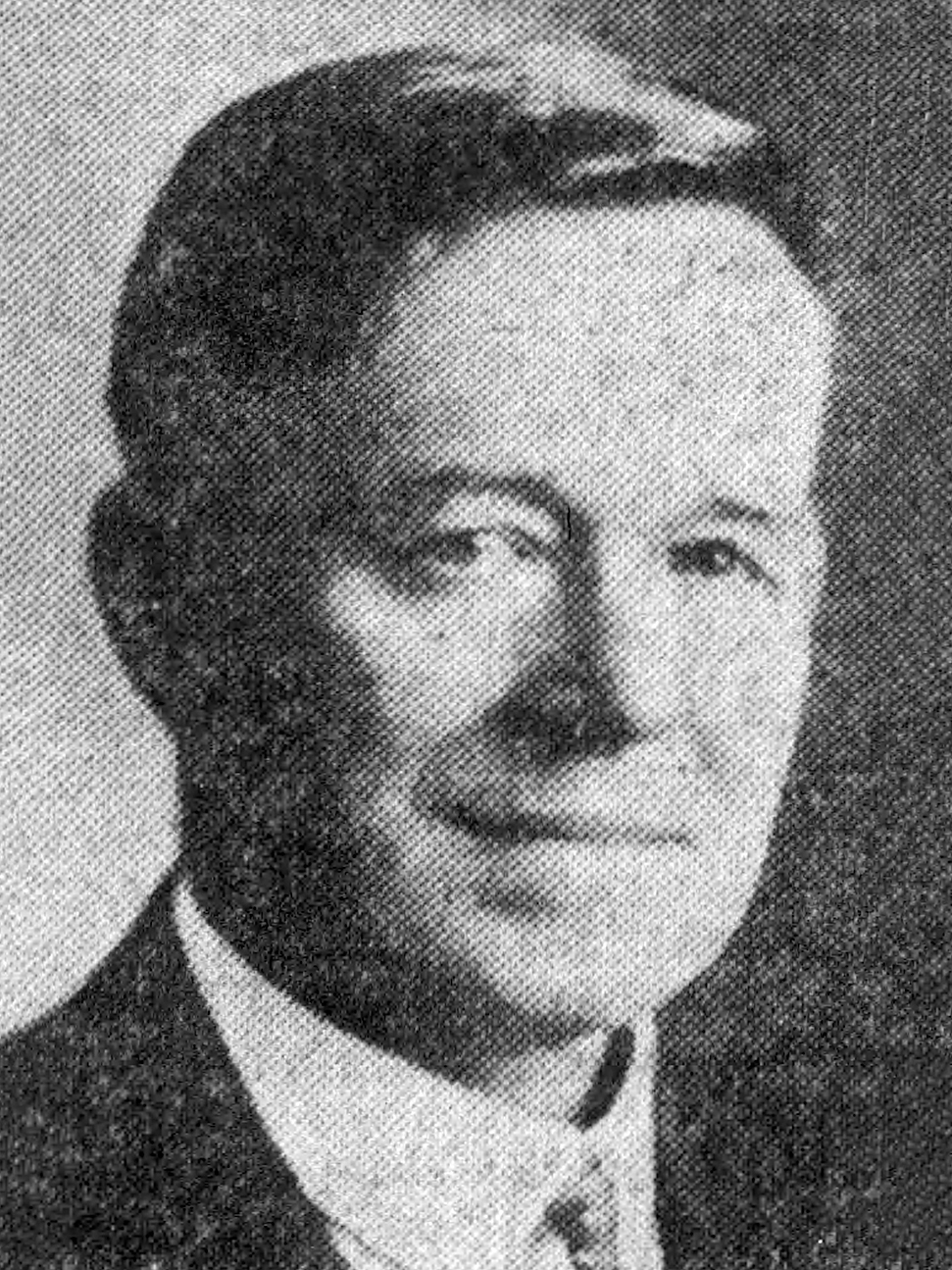
- Barnes in 1925

Member of the Los Angeles City Council from the 12th district
- In office July 1, 1925 – June 30, 1927
- Preceded by: District established
- Succeeded by: Douglas Eads Foster

Personal details
- Born: Alfred James Barnes
- Party: Progressive

Alfred James Barnes was the first person to represent the 12th district of the Los Angeles City Council under the new charter in 1925. He served until 1927.

Barnes, a contractor and real-estate man who had lived in Los Angeles since 1904, was elected to the City Council in 1925, but failed in a re-election bid in 1927, when he lost the primary election to Douglas Eads Foster and Clarence W. Horn by just seven votes, determined only after a recount was held. Barnes was known as a supporter of Mayor George E. Cryer, and he was endorsed by organized labor. The 12th District at that time was bounded by Main Street, Sunset Boulevard, Temple Street, Fountain Avenue and Hoover Street.

Barnes ran unsuccessfully for the Los Angeles County Board of Supervisors two times. After his City Council service, he became a field secretary for Supervisor J. Don Mahaffey.

In 1932 he was active in a protest movement against a proposal to give the University of Southern California preferential rights to use the Los Angeles Memorial Coliseum during the football season.

In 1934, Barnes was secretary of the California Progressive Party State Central Committee and caused a stir when he resigned his position in protest of the party's support of Raymond L. Haight in the gubernatorial election that year and urged support for Governor Frank Merriam in order to avoid giving the election to Upton Sinclair, the End Poverty in California candidate. Barnes ran as the Progressive Party's candidate for the state Board of Equalization later that year and came in third.

== Other sources ==
- Chronological Record of Los Angeles City Officials: 1850–1938, compiled under the direction of the Municipal Reference Library, City Hall, Los Angeles, March 1938 (reprinted 1966)

Preceded by —	Los Angeles City Council; 12th District; 1925–1927	Succeeded by Douglas Eads Foster
