= Robert Stewart Sparks =

American politician

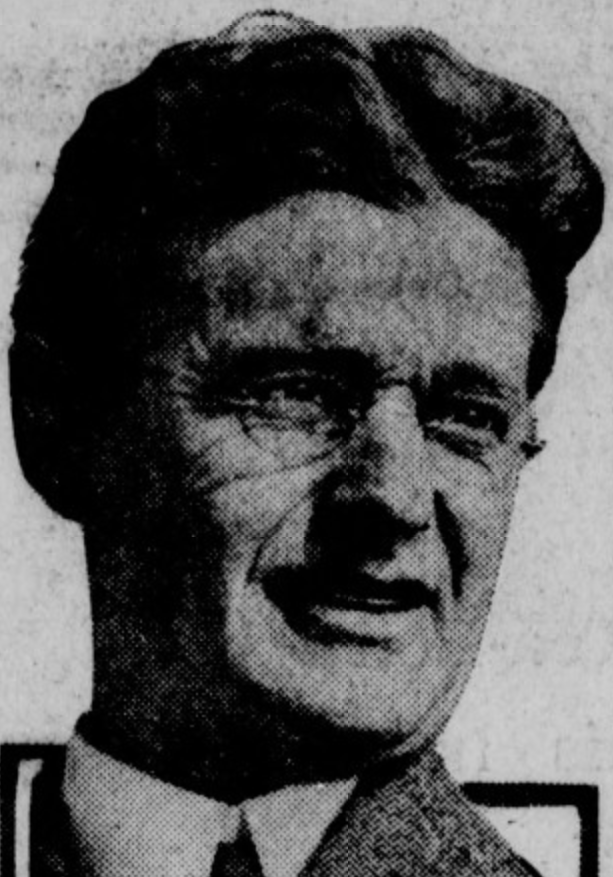
- Sparks in 1920

Member of the Los Angeles City Council from the 5th district
- In office July 1, 1925 – June 30, 1927
- Preceded by: District established
- Succeeded by: Virgil A. Martin

Member of the Los Angeles City Council from the at-large district
- In office July 5, 1921 – July 1, 1923

Personal details
- Born: March 31, 1871 Anoka, Minnesota
- Died: March 25, 1932 (aged 60) Los Angeles, California
- Party: Republican

Robert "Cupid" Stewart Sparks (March 31, 1871 – March 25, 1932) was a Los Angeles City Council member in the 1920s. He was the first person to represent the 5th District under a new city charter effective in 1925. Earlier, he was given the nickname "Cupid" while he managed Los Angeles' marriage licensing bureau for 19 years. Robert, along with his wife, ran an informal matchmaking service throughout Los Angeles County.

== Biography ==
Sparks was born on March 31, 1871, in Anoka, Minnesota, the son of Henry Sparks. He graduated with an engineering degree from the University of Minnesota in Saint Paul and moved to Los Angeles in 1894 to engage in the real-estate business; he was married to Edith McGinty of that city the same year. They had one son, Richard.

Sparks entered the office of the County Clerk as deputy in charge of the marriage-license division in December 1912 and there was given the nickname "Cupid" during his tenure. He was ousted as deputy in 1920 after L. E. Lampton was elected clerk. Tension with Clerk Lampton began as Sparks refused to publish news of marriage licenses being issued to movie stars. These included the marriage of Douglas Fairbanks and Mary Pickford as well Charlie Chaplin and Mildred Harris. Sparks also operated an informal matchmaking service from "having received thousands of letters from lonely men and women asking for his assistance in securing mates." He and his wife would "study the letters, and from the descriptions given we match up the requirements as best we can, and then I put the husband-seekers and wife-seekers in touch with each other by letter. Hundreds of marriages have resulted." Robert said he would continue the practice after his election to the City Council in 1921 but "out of office hours."

In 1923, on the occasion of his 29th wedding anniversary, he noted that he had issued more than 200,000 marriage licenses and gave this advice to husbands:

Self-preservation and protection is the first law for husbands, and to have a happy married life, such as I have had, remember the anniversaries with gifts for the wives. They expect it. If husbands do this and storm clouds arise, and the matrimonial lute shows signs of piping some sour notes, the wives recall that their husbands, alone and unaided, did remember the anniversaries, and the difficulties melt away.

Between 1923 and 1925 Sparks returned to the real-estate business and also purchased the Los Angeles Chronicle, a newspaper for city employees. He became a county employee again in December 1931 as assistant chief real-estate appraiser in the County Assessor's Office.

A Presbyterian, he was a member of the Elks, Knights of Pythias, Woodmen of the World, Masons and Union League. He was a Republican.

He was living at 2646 South Normandie Avenue when he died on March 25, 1932. He was buried in Rosedale Cemetery.

== City Council ==
=== Elections ===
In the May 1921 primary election Sparks placed 15th in a citywide field of more than 30 candidates, with the top 18 being nominated for a final round in June. In the general election, he placed first and was thus chosen, along with eight other successful candidates, for a two-year term on the council.

Sparks placed seventh in the citywide primary of May 1923, with 26,971 votes, and was nominated for re-election. In the June final he came in 11th, with 34,458 votes, and was defeated; only the top nine vote-getters were elected.

Sparks was out of the council for two years, but in 1925 he returned as the first person to represent the 5th District under the new city charter, which replaced the former at-large election system with one based on single-member constituencies. He was elected 4,379 votes to John Topham's 3,075. In 1925, the 5th District was bounded by Washington Street on the north, the city limits on the east, Exposition Boulevard on the south and Vermont Avenue on the west.

He ran again in the 1927 election but this time he was linked to the unpopular mayoral administration of George E. Cryer, and he was soundly defeated in the final round by Virgil A. Martin, 7,843-2,889. Before that election he was criticized for having mailed letters on official city stationery to people who were on a tentative list for appointment as election precinct workers, asking them to call on him to "discuss with you some matters in which I am interested."

=== Council actions ===
One of the first controversial votes cast by Sparks was in opposition to a proposal by religious groups for a seven-member commission to regulate the showing of motion pictures in Los Angeles. He said he was "flatly opposed" to censorship, and the idea was eventually killed by the City Council amid a storm of protests by both sides. A later resolution defending the film industry, authored by Sparks, was adopted. The "reflections cast upon this industry and its people are the work of a malignant minority," it read.

It was Sparks who introduced a successful resolution into the City Council on January 15, 1923, for the formation of a Board of Freeholders that was assigned to develop a new city charter for Los Angeles. The move was supported by the Los Angeles Chamber of Commerce.

He also called on the city to require private hospitals to give emergency care to accident victims to avoid the "long delays in transporting injured persons to the Receiving Hospital at First and Hill streets."

In 1925 he voted against a request by the Humane Animal Commission for funding of five additional inspectors: "You know how I stand about animals," said Sparks, a former president of the Society for the Prevention of Cruelty to Animals. "All those inspectors do is to pursue poor people for the measly $2 dog tax. Every child should have a dog. yet many children cannot have dogs because of this tax." The next year he opposed placing on the election ballot a measure that would allow animal-control officers to, as he said, "go on the premises of a dog owner and take away any dog not tied up or on a leash. In other words, the ordinance would permit one's personal property to be seized."

Preceded by —	Los Angeles City Council; 5th District; 1925–27	Succeeded by Virgil A. Martin
