= Austin Conrad Shafer =

American politician

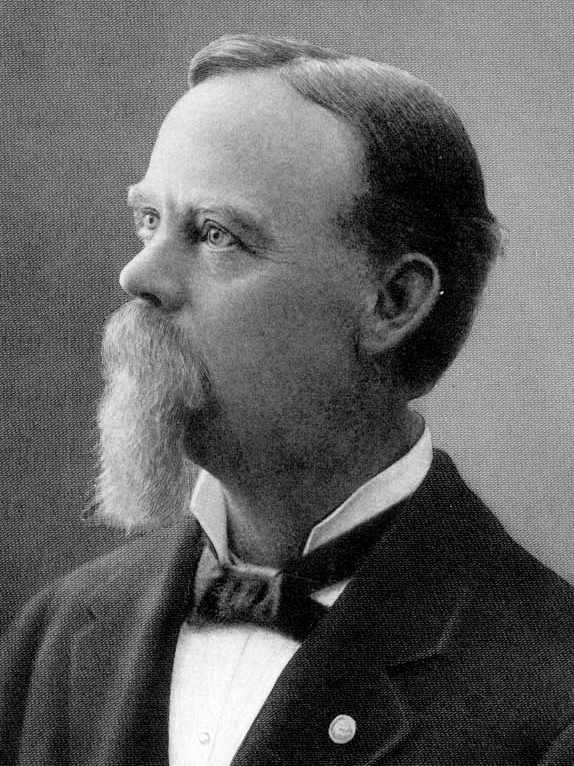

Member of the Los Angeles City Council from the 5th ward
- In office February 25, 1889 – December 5, 1890
- Preceded by: District established
- Succeeded by: John Q. Tufts

Member of the Los Angeles Common Council from the 5th ward
- In office December 10, 1888 – February 21, 1889

Personal details
- Born: May 19, 1844 Mount Ephraim, Ohio
- Died: August 15, 1944 (aged 100) Los Angeles, California
- Party: Republican

Austin Conrad Shafer (May 19, 1844 – August 15, 1944) was a schoolteacher, property owner and real estate agent who served on the Los Angeles, California, Common Council, the legislative branch of the city, in the 19th century and was president of that city's school board.

== Personal ==
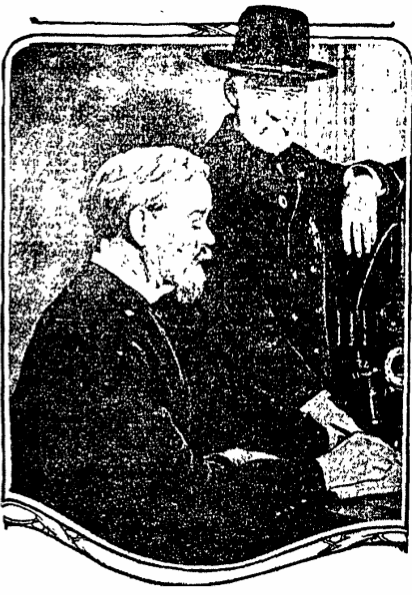
A. C. Shafer and Commander C.H. Haskins, standing, observed the transfer of the Departmental Headquarters of the Grand Army of the Republic from San Francisco to Los Angeles in June 1917.

Shafer was born May 19, 1844, in Mount Ephraim, Ohio, the son of William Shafer of Virginia and Isabel Voorhies of New York. He came to California in 1872 and to Los Angeles in 1876. Shafer and Mary Harriot Harrold of Oak Ranch, San Joaquin Valley, were married on November 2, 1879, and they had three children, Roy V. Shafer, Effie Mae Wilgus and Callie Shafer, who died in 1896 at the age of 3.

After Shafer moved to Los Angeles, he built a "neat $1000 cottage on the hills near Ellis Villa College," where it was noted that "Considerable property has been sold . . . since the beginning of the Cable road" (a cable railway built east–west on Second Street over Bunker Hill, Los Angeles). Shafer lived in the same house at 1801 Church Avenue (later 1801 South Kingsley Drive), from at least 1909 to the mid-1930s, in today's Harvard Heights area.

Shafer died at the age of 100 on August 15, 1944, in the Veterans Administration Hospital in Sawtelle. Interment was at Rosedale Cemetery.

== Education and vocation ==
As a child, Shafer was unable to get much education at the "log cabin school a mile from his home," which he attended only during the few winter months that he was not needed to help on the farm. After serving as a soldier in the American Civil War, Shafer went back to school and, side by side with 10-year-olds, he pursued his studies, later being able to teach school and earn money to pay his way through four years at Iowa State College. After his death, his daughter Effie said her father was a professor of Latin at the University of Iowa when he came to Los Angeles for a visit and stayed.

Shafer taught in the San Joaquin Valley and then moved to Los Angeles and worked at the first public school in Santa Monica. He was the only teacher at Cahuenga School, which served the areas later known as Hollywood and the Wilshire District. One of his students there was Los Angeles Mayor Charles E. Sebastian. Shafer also taught in Vernon and Spadra, California.

During the real estate boom of 1886, Shafer gave up teaching and went into the real estate business, particularly in subdividing large estates into home sites. One of his endeavors, Shafer & Town, in 1887 purchased a 75-acre plot known as the Throop property at the corner of Main and Jefferson streets, for $176,000.

In 1894, Shafer was engaged in a new venture "on New Main street, three miles south of the City Hall"—"a young nursery of thirty acres" said to consist of "100,000 peach, 100,000 apricot and 20,000 plum trees, all a year old, and 20,000 apple trees that are 2 years old," all of them raised from seed.

He retired in 1922.

== Military ==
In the Civil War Shafer was in the 92nd Ohio Infantry and took part in General William Tecumseh Sherman's March to the Sea and the Battle of Chickamauga. In 1895 he returned to the battlefield when it was dedicated as the Chickamauga and Chattanooga National Military Park, and two years later he presented to the City of Los Angeles two pine-tree saplings that he had taken from the site—one of them "from a point east of the southwest corner of Kelly field, over which the battle raged and swayed for two days with intense fury," and the other from "west of the tower on Horse-shoe Ridge, where at 2 o'clock of the last day's fight, the reserves of Granger and Stedman turned back the exulting foe just as complete triumph seemed to be within their grasp."

== Public service ==
A Republican, Shafer was a member of the Los Angeles Common Council, the legislative branch of the city, in 1888–90. Elected from the 5th Ward in 1888, he was said to represent the city's "religious element," and it was he who successfully fought for Sunday closing of saloons. He was the only member of the Common Council to be reelected after the city charter of 1889 went into effect.

He was elected to the Los Angeles school board on December 1, 1890, and resigned on August 7, 1891. Shafer returned to the board in 1891–92, was chosen as president and introduced the flying of the U.S. flag over the city's schoolhouses.

== Memberships ==
Shafer was a Mason and a Methodist. In the mid-1930s was commander of the Southern California Veterans Association of Civil War Veterans. He held every elective office in Stanton Post of the Grand Army of the Republic, and in 1935 he organized the post's Last Man Club of members over 90 years of age.

== Positions ==
In 1925, Shafer wrote a letter to the Los Angeles Times in which he decried a proposal by Stanford University President David Starr Jordan that a fund be gathered to put John T. Scopes, the Tennessee teacher who was tried for the teaching of evolution. through college. "By making a hero out of a lawbreaker[,] others are encouraged to disobedience of the law," he wrote.

== References and notes ==
Access to the Los Angeles Times links may require the use of a library card.
