= Douglas Eads Foster =

American politician

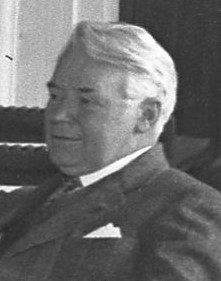
- Foster in 1928

Member of the Los Angeles City Council from the 12th district
- Preceded by: A. J. Barnes
- Succeeded by: Thomas W. Williams

Personal details
- Born: August 21, 1875 Warrensburg, Missouri
- Died: July 22, 1962 (aged 86) Los Angeles, California
- Party: Republican
- Spouse: Alicia Ella Christian Stepper (m. 1903)
- Children: 3
- Education: University of Missouri; Washington University in St. Louis

Douglas Eads Foster (August 21, 1875 – July 22, 1962) was a dentist who served on the Los Angeles City Council between 1927 and 1929.

== Biography ==
Foster was born August 21, 1875, in Warrensburg, Missouri, the son of James Madison Foster and Agnes Johnson Eads, his father dying when he was just three years old. He went to public schools in Warrensburg, and then to the University of Missouri in Columbia and Washington School of Dentistry in St. Louis, Missouri. He took postgraduate work at the University of Southern California.

In 1898 Foster volunteered for hospital service in the Spanish–American War and afterward helped in setting up the United States Army Dental Corps, being commissioned as one of the first dental surgeons in the U.S. Army in 1902. He served in that capacity until moving to Los Angeles the same year, where he practiced dentistry until he retired in 1924. After leaving the City Council in 1929 he worked in real estate.

Foster was married first to Alicia C. Stepper in 1897 in Springfield, Kentucky, by whom he had three children, Martha, Douglas Jr., and Jane. He married Margaret O. Montgomery in an Episcopal ceremony on September 2, 1927, with Los Angeles City Council Member Arthur Alber as best man.

He died on July 22, 1962, in his home at 421 S. Bixel Street, leaving his widow, Margaret O., a son, Douglas F. Foster; a daughter, Jane Foster Morris; and a sister, Mrs. Frank W. Taggart. Although in 1927 he was a member of the Wilshire Boulevard Christian Church, his funeral service was a requiem mass at the Roman Catholic Church of the Immaculate Conception in Los Angeles.

== City Council ==
Foster was elected to the City Council in the 12th District over Clarence W. Horn in 1927 to represent the 12th District but was defeated for reelection in 1929 by Thomas W. Williams.

A Republican, he opposed giving the city a monopoly on electrical power generation and distribution "on the grounds that private industry is entitled to share in such business." He was active in promoting the completion of the Third Street Tunnel.

His term was marked by his rivalry with George Parrish, head of the city's Health Department, whom Foster accused of stepping outside his assigned powers in enforcing health standards on handlers of food and in assigning nurses to work with a private insurance company. At one council meeting Foster said that the "asserted regularities in the administration of the health department constitute malfeasance in office," over which charge Parrish threatened to bring a libel action. Later Foster was branded an "obstructionist" in the matter of requiring food handlers, even small grocers, to be medically examined. The two men traded charges also about the use of city staff and automobiles in conducting political campaigns.

Foster began a campaign against smoking by children when he proposed that "the sale of tobacco, cigarettes, cigarette papers and wrappers be prohibited within two blocks of any public school." A smoker himself, Foster later withdrew his suggestion because of concerns that it would be held illegal under the state constitution.

Preceded by A. J. Barnes	Los Angeles City Council; 12th district 1925–1927	Succeeded by Thomas W. Williams
