= Thomas Strohm =

American fire chief (1846-1929)

Thomas Strohm (1846–1929) was fire chief of the city of Los Angeles for three separate terms between 1887 and 1905 as well as a Los Angeles City Council member during 1892–94. He was denied a city pension although he had been injured on the job. Strohm also began a company that later became the Shasta Water Company.

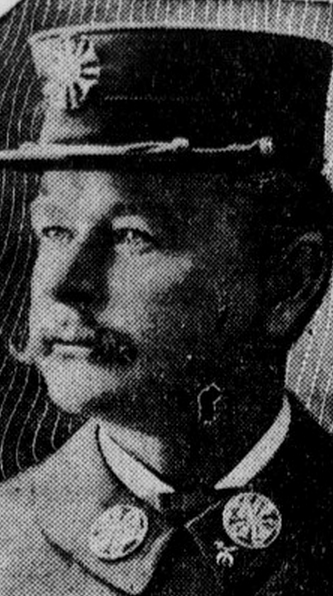
Strohm

== Personal ==
Strohm was born on November 5, 1846, near Ulm, Wurtemberg, Germany, to Matthew Strohm and Anna Barbara Jauch, both of that city. The family emigrated to America in 1852, crossing from Le Havre, France, to New Orleans and thence by river boat to Cincinnati, Ohio, where his father, a master mason and contractor went into business. Young Thomas attended public schools in Cincinnati, then learned to be a machinist and a gym instructor. He moved to Kansas City, Missouri, in 1868, then to California, near San Francisco (or in Sacramento), in 1872 or 1873, and he briefly worked in the San Francisco Mint. In 1876 he moved to Wilmington, California, at that time a separate city, and to Los Angeles two years later.

He was married to Emily Schubnell of Oregon; their children were Louis Robert (or Lew), Walter Thomas, Benjamin Clarence and Anna Barbara (Mrs. George O'Donnell). A son, Tommie, died at the age of 9 months in July 1890. Emily died on December 24, 1917.

Strohm was "a leader in affairs concerning the Germania Turn-Verein[,] around which centered much of the civic, social and recreational, and municipal activity of pioneer Los Angeles." He was an instructor in a boys' class of gymnastics for the organization in 1878, and he was noted as "one of the most graceful and thorough acrobats we have ever seen." By 1906 he had become known for his "florid face and gold-rimmed goggles" shining "through the smoke and flame."

At the time of his death on March 22, 1929, he was the oldest Knight Templar in Los Angeles, and he had also been past master of Masonic Lodge No. 42. He had been an Elk and a member of the Ancient Order of United Workmen.

Strohm died at age 82 in the home of his daughter, 1341 Mariposa Street, in today's East Hollywood neighborhood, His body lay in state in a Venice Boulevard funeral home, and a burial service was at Inglewood Park Cemetery.

== Vocation ==
=== City Council ===
Strohm was elected to the Los Angeles City Council from the 7th Ward in December 1892 and served until December 1894.

=== Private business ===
Strohm worked as a machinist (above), but after moving to Los Angeles he ran a grocery business at First Street near Alameda Avenue for about seven years; then he went into the business of manufacturing ice and soda water, at 323 Towne Avenue. The company later became the Head Excelsior Water Bottling Company and then the Shasta Water Company. Strohm turned the business over to his son, C.B. Strohm, in October 1904.

=== Public employment ===
Strohm volunteered as a fireman on March 20, 1876, and in 1904 he recalled that

At that time there were two engine companies, a volunteer service, and only the driver and engineer paid. The city rented its buildings, and that was all the fire department there was. Now we have twelve engine companies in service and one in reserve, five hose companies and two chemical companies, making nineteen houses in all. and there are 128 men on the pay roll. We have eighty-five horses instead of the four we had in 1876, for at that time the hose reels were hauled by hand.

He was injured on the job on December 9, 1901, when he was climbing an 18-foot ladder during a fire at 310 Omar Avenue, just behind his own home. He suffered a fractured foot, and his symptoms included nausea and sleeplessness, as well as a deafness in his left ear, the side opposite the injury to his head, He resumed work after about six weeks, and "in a few days met with another accident, in which the muscles in his right arm were torn from their fastenings."

During his illness the big Hayden & Lewis fire occurred and the chief's presence was deemed necessary. He was taken out of bed and driven to the scene of the blaze and, though unable to stand, directed the movements of his department from the wagon in which he had been carried to the fire.

Strohm was Los Angeles city fire chief, or chief engineer, on three occasions—in 1887–88, 1889–91 and 1900–05.

Strohm lost his fire chief job for the last time in February 1905 after newly elected Mayor Owen McAleer had said in advance that "there were "certain irregularities that Chief Strohm knows all about, and which he and I have discussed, as well as personal habits to which I take exception." Strohm was then "quietly fired," as the Los Angeles Times put it, by the Board of Fire Commissioners and Walter Lips, an engineer with the department, installed in his place.

In June 1905, the Board of Fire Commissioners denied Strohm's application for a pension after he had been examined by five doctors, "three of whom declared he was physically incapacitated and the other two agreeing he was in ill health." The Los Angeles Herald stated:

Thus the city of Los Angeles, through its officials, has refused to reward one of the oldest, and if the records of the underwriters prove anything, ablest fire fighters in the country. The law provides for the pensioning of firemen at half pay when they have served a certain length of time or are disabled in the service.

In 1906 Strohm was serving as a deputy sheriff in Los Angeles Superior Court, and the next year he was a city meat inspector. He was also a deputy United States marshal.

Strohm was employed as a storekeeper on the Los Angeles Aqueduct project in 1909, which was being built to bring water to Los Angeles from the Owens River Valley. In June of that year he was injured when he attempted to stop a rail car filled with cement which had broken away on a downgrade. He "climbed upon the car to set the brakes, but was thrown off and his left leg was broken above the knee."
