= James Greer McDonald =

American surveyor, horticulturalist and politician

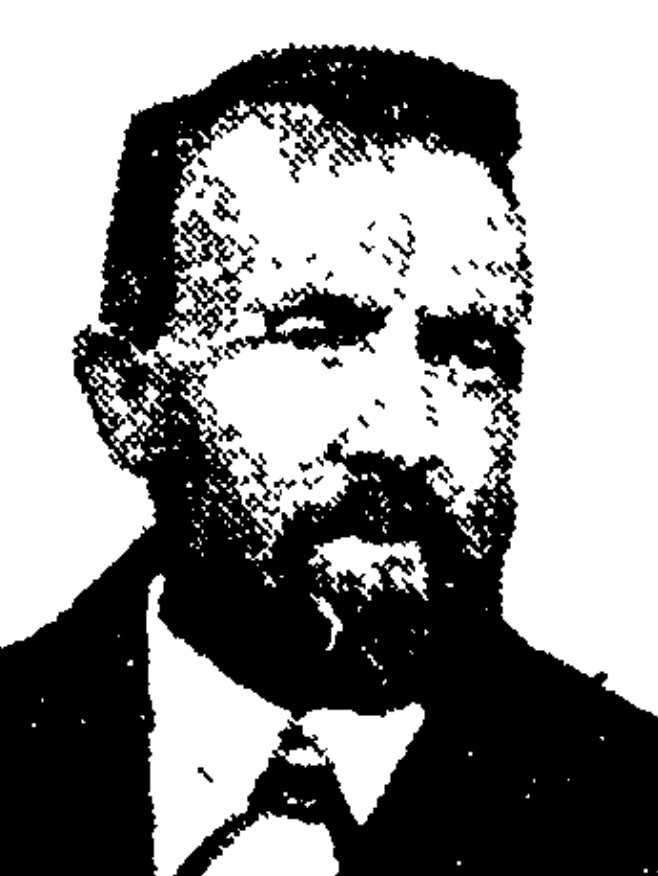

Member of the Los Angeles Common Council from the 5th ward
- In office December 5, 1878 – December 10, 1881
- Preceded by: District established
- Succeeded by: Otto G. Weyse

Personal details
- Born: March 22, 1824 Wilson County, Tennessee
- Died: January 23, 1909 (aged 84) Los Angeles, California
- Party: Democratic
- Spouse: Margaret V. Samuel (m. 1858)
- Children: 3

James Greer McDonald (March 22, 1824 – January 23, 1909) was a surveyor in Los Angeles County, California, an authority on horticulture and a member of the Los Angeles Common Council, the governing body of that city, in the 19th century.

== Biography ==
McDonald was born on March 22, 1824, in Wilson County, Tennessee, the son of James McDonald, a minister of the Cumberland Presbyterian Church. The family moved to Texas in 1838 and lived there until 1853, when young McDonald was offered a job as a deputy surveyor-general of California, under John C. Hayes. He voyaged to California and crossed Mexico via the Isthmus of Tehuantepec.

In 1858, McDonald returned to Texas and was married to Margaret V. Samuel. In the same year he organized a group to cross the plains to California by the southern route, surveying the Mexico–United States border. More than ten months later, his wife joined him, making the overland trip by stage.

McDonald died in his home at 1525 East 20th Street on January 23, 1909, leaving his wife and three children, James T. McDonald, Mrs. Thomas Weiss and Mrs. Grant Roberds, all of Los Angeles.

== Public service ==
In his work as a California deputy surveyor, McDonald made the first surveys of the San Jacinto and Warner ranches, and in 1862 he was elected surveyor of Los Angeles County. He became an authority on horticulture and was appointed state Horticultural Inspector.

McDonald was elected to the Los Angeles Common Council on December 2, 1878, to represent the 5th Ward and was re–elected the next two years.

== Vocation ==
Besides his surveying work, McDonald attempted mining ventures with William Workman, but when they failed to succeed, he turned to citriculture, renting the "noted orchard" of William Wolfskill and later planting a 40-acre grove of his own, where he had his family home, in today's Central-Alameda district.

== References and notes ==
Access to the Los Angeles Times link may require the use of a library card.
