= Otto G. Weyse =

American politician

Member of the Los Angeles Common Council from the 5th ward
- In office December 10, 1881 – December 8, 1883
- Preceded by: James Greer McDonald
- Succeeded by: John B. Niles

Personal details
- Born: 1858 California
- Died: February 22, 1893 (aged 34–35) San Francisco, California
- Party: Democratic
- Spouse: Louise Naud (m. 1883; div. 1888)
- Children: 4

Otto Guenther Weyse (also Günther-Weyse; 1858 – February 22, 1893) was an American liquor and wine dealer in 19th-century Los Angeles. He was a member of the Los Angeles Common Council and was instrumental in bringing a visiting San Francisco opera company to Los Angeles. He was noted statewide as a man who sent his child to Mexico during a prolonged and "sensational" divorce battle with his French-born heiress wife.

== Personal ==
=== Family ===
Weyse was born in California, the son of emigrants Julius Günther-Weyse from Saxony, who owned a vineyard on what is now Eighth Street near San Pedro Street, and Caroline Günther-Wyse from Denmark. He had two brothers, Henry Guenther Weyse, an attorney and member of the State Legislature, and Rudolf Guenther Weyse. In testimony at his divorce trial (below), he said he spent "some years at college abroad."

=== Residences ===
In 1887 Weyse bought the residence of pioneer brickmaker and fellow Common Council member Joseph Mullaly at 19 College Street, in today's Chinatown. It was noted as being:

one of the finest residences in the city of Los Angeles.The grounds have a frontage of one hundred and eighty-five feet on Buena Vista street and two hundred and eighty-five feet on College, and contain a fine bearing orchard, consisting of orange, lemon, pear, apple trees, etc.

The family homestead and vineyard, however, was at 8th and San Pedro Streets—the winery in a two-story brick building constructed in 1884. As a real estate boom hit Southern California, the land was divided for sale, and the winery building was leased to the firm of Weisendanger & Nardmore, which overhauled the machinery and reopened in 1891 as a starch manufactory from potatoes. On December 10, 1891, the boiler exploded, almost leveling the building and heavily damaging the adjoining family quarters, where Otto Weyse was the only occupant; he escaped injury.

=== Marriage and divorce ===
On May 2, 1883, Weyse married Louise Naud of Vaucluse, France. She was the widow of Edward Naud, Weyse's business partner, who had died in 1881 "leaving his wealth to his wife." She had two children, Louisa and Louis, by her first husband. New York City Mayor William Russell Grace officiated at the wedding in Hoboken, New Jersey. They lived for a time on Staten Island, New York, and within a few weeks, according to the San Francisco Chronicle, Weyse began to physically abuse his wife. She left him and returned to France. He followed her in 1888, "but his wife was informed of his coming and at once started to return" to the United States. "The two passed in mid-ocean." After a short reconciliation, Mrs. Weyse took her case to divorce court in July 1888, with her testimony (given in French) centering on the abuse. At that point, Weyse had physical custody of their child, a boy named Otto, whom he refused to turn over to his wife.

In October 1889 a suit was opened by Otto Weyse and his brother, R. G. Weyse, alleging that they were entitled to half the estate left by Edouard Naud because of, among other things, a marriage contract signed by Otto and Louise Naud, of which Louise later disputed the genuineness. The alleged contract provided that:

all children born of the union of the couple shall be taught to regard the children by Mrs. Weyse's first husband [Naud] as brothers and sisters; that they shall never be reproached with the fact that their father [Weyse] was a German; that they shall under no circumstances be raised as Catholics without their father's consent; that all the wife's business should be transacted by her new husband and that the question, "mine or thine" with reference to property, should never come up between the couple.

In that same month it was discovered that Otto, the couple's son, was absent from Los Angeles, and detectives found that he had been spirited to a ranch near Tijuana, Mexico by his father. A warrant was issued for his arrest on a charge of kidnapping, but the child was returned to Los Angeles in advance of any legal action.

During the "long and expensive" divorce litigation, one of Louise's witnesses, Thomas Keys, was "spirited out of the county", but a private detective agency located him on a bee ranch in San Diego County, and he testified he was bribed by Otto Weyse and a "party named Jones", who was arrested. Mrs. Weyse won a divorce on July 10, 1890.

In August 1892, Louise Weyse was granted an order by a Los Angeles court to change her legal name back to Louise Naud. Her petition related that she had had "great family trouble and much scandalous litigation with h[e]r second husband and his family, named Weyse, the odium of which still adheres to said name and causes her great mental pain, suffering and discontent." She presented evidence of letters addressed to her having been opened and delayed in reaching her.

=== Memberships ===
Weyse was a member of the Los Angeles Athletic Club and the Turnverein Society and a charter member of the Los Angeles Native Sons of the Golden West, founded in 1887.

=== Injury and death ===
On July 8, 1889, Weyse shot himself in the side, but the actual cause and circumstance were not verified. It was reported then that he was suffering from consumption. He died in San Francisco on February 22, 1893, at the age of 34 years and 11 months. Burial was in San Francisco.

== Business ==
In April 1886, Weyse was arrested in Los Angeles and faced trial in San Francisco on a charge that he had interfered with a federal revenue officer, a gauger who had stopped a wagon as it was leaving the Weyse distillery and found two demijohns filled with brandy. The circumstance resulted in the seizure of the distillery by the government.

In February 188,7 Weyse announced that he had purchased property between Main and Los Angeles street, midblock between Fifth and Sixth streets, in order to build a new theater of 2,000 seats, which would have been twice the size of Childs Opera House. In May of that year, he signed a contract with the National Opera Company of San Francisco to guarantee $20,000 for five performances of grand opera at Hazard's Pavilion. He partnered in the enterprise with "Messrs. McLain & Lehman."

== Common Council ==
A Democrat, Weyse was elected to represent the 5th ward on the Los Angeles Common Council, the legislative arm of the city government, in December 1881 and served two one-year terms, until December 1883.
