= Robert E. Wirsching =

American politician (1846–1912)

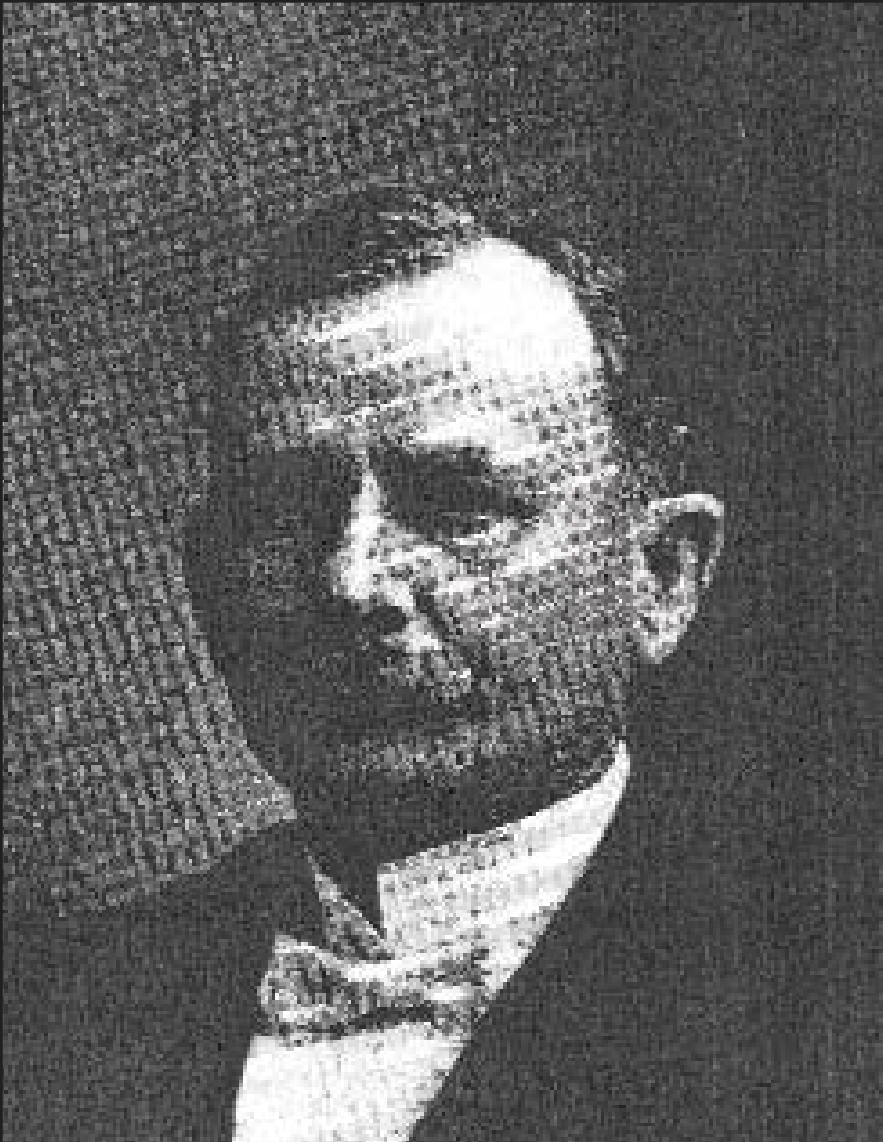

Member of the Los Angeles County Board of Supervisors for the 2nd district
- In office January 4, 1897 – 1901
- Preceded by: Andrew W. Francisco
- Succeeded by: George Alexander

Member of the Los Angeles City Council for the 9th ward
- In office February 25, 1889 – December 5, 1890
- Preceded by: Constituency established
- Succeeded by: Samuel Rees

Personal details
- Born: February 15, 1846 Meiningen, Germany
- Died: August 30, 1912 (aged 66) Los Angeles, California
- Party: Republican
- Spouse: Carlota E. Wirsching (m. 1880)
- Children: 4, including Carl

Robert Ernest Wirsching (February 15, 1846 – August 30, 1912) was a German-born American politician who served on the Los Angeles City Council and the Los Angeles County Board of Supervisors.

== Early life and career ==
Wirsching was born on February 15, 1846, in Meiningen, Germany, with his family immigrating to the United States in 1852 and settling in Connecticut, where he attended school. In 1875, he moved to Los Angeles in an attempt to seek out fortune, partnering with Samuel Rees, who would later succeed Wirsching as a Councilman, to form Rees & Wirsching. They did blacksmithing and built wagons in their store at Aliso Street before relocating to Los Angeles Street and selling modern agricultural items.

== Political career ==
In 1889, Wirsching was elected to the Los Angeles City Council for the newly created 9th Ward. His tenure was short lived, only in office for a year before the next election. In 1896, Wirsching was elected to the Los Angeles County Board of Supervisors and assumed office on January 4, 1897. He was in office until 1901, to which he was succeeded by future Los Angeles mayor George Alexander.

In 1913, Mayor Henry H. Rose announced the appointment of Wirsching to the Board of Public Utilities, assuming office on December 17, 1913. He was confirmed by the City Council, with President Frederick J. Whiffen against the nomination. In 1915, Wirsching withdrew from the candidacy to become the president of the board, but was later appointed in 1917. His term expired on January 11, 1922.

== Personal life ==
In 1880, Wirsching married Carlota E. Wirsching, and with Carlota they had four children: Carl, Robert, Ernest, and Rose.
