= Los Angeles's 7th City Council district =

American legislative district

Councilmember
| Monica Rodriguez; D–Mission Hills |
since July 1, 2017
- Demographics: 22.3% White; 3.1% Black; 68.3% Hispanic; 6.3% Asian; 0.3% Other
- Population (2020): 268,710
- Registered voters (2017): 124,771
- Website: cd7.lacity.gov

Los Angeles's 7th City Council district is one of the fifteen districts in the Los Angeles City Council. It is currently represented by Democrat Monica Rodriguez since 2017 after winning an election to succeed Felipe Fuentes, who resigned the year prior.

The district was created in 1925 after a new city charter was passed, which replaced the former "at large" voting system for a nine-member council with a district system with a 15-member council. At its creation, the 7th district was situated south of Downtown Los Angeles. It was moved to the San Fernando Valley in 1956.

== Geography ==
The 7th district includes the neighborhoods of Sylmar, Mission Hills, Pacoima, Sunland-Tujunga, Lake View Terrace, Shadow Hills, La Tuna Canyon, and the northern portion of North Hills East.

The district overlaps California's 29th congressional district and California's 30th congressional district, is completely within California's 20th State Senate district, and overlaps California's 43rd State Assembly district and California's 44th State Assembly district.

=== Historical boundaries ===
At its creation, it was bounded on the north by Jefferson Boulevard, on the south by Slauson Boulevard, on the west by Vermont Avenue and on the east by South Park Avenue. In 1928, it expanded to include Exposition Park and Vermont Square. In 1933, it was bounded on the east by Alameda Avenue, on the west by Crenshaw Boulevard, on the north by Exposition Boulevard and on the south by Vernon Avenue. By 1937, it was bounded on the west by Crenshaw Boulevard, on the north by Exposition Boulevard, on the east by the city boundary with Vernon and on the south by Vernon Avenue.

By 1947, it was noted that nearly 50% of the district's population was African-American. In 1956, after incumbent councilman Don A. Allen's election to the California State Assembly, the City Council decided that the district would be moved to the San Fernando Valley. In 1961, it included the neighborhoods of Van Nuys, Sepulveda, Granada Hills and Sylmar. In 1986, it included Panorama City, part of Sun Valley and Sylmar. By 1993, it had a population that consisted of 70% Latinos and 19% African-Americans council that covered "much of the northeast Valley", encompassing "one of Los Angeles's poorest areas" and containing "the shuttered General Motors plant in Van Nuys as well as Blythe Street in Panorama City, one of the Valley's most drug-infested areas until a police crackdown."

== List of members representing the district ==
=== 1889–1909 ===
| Councilmember | Party | Years | Electoral history |
|---|---|---|---|
Single-member ward established February 25, 1889
| J. T. Brown (Boyle Heights) | Republican | February 25, 1889 – December 5, 1890 | Elected in 1889. [data missing] |
| Daniel M. McGarry (Downtown) | Democratic | December 5, 1890 – December 5, 1892 | Elected in 1890. [data missing] |
| Thomas Strohm (East Hollywood) | Republican | December 5, 1892 – December 12, 1894 | Elected in 1892. [data missing] |
| James Ashman (South Central) | Democratic | December 12, 1894 – December 16, 1896 | Elected in 1894. [data missing] |
| Benjamin S. Lauder (Highland Park) | Republican | December 15, 1898 – December 5, 1902 | Elected in 1898. Re-elected in 1900. [data missing] |
| Edward Kern (Downtown) | Democratic | December 5, 1902 – November 26, 1906 | Elected in 1902. Re-elected in 1904. Resigned. |
| Vacant | | November 26, 1906 – December 13, 1906 | |
| Henry H. Lyon (Downtown) | Republican | December 13, 1906 – December 10, 1909 | Elected in 1906. Redistricted to the at-large district and lost re-election. |
Single-member ward eliminated December 10, 1909

=== 1925–present ===
| Councilmember | Party | Dates | Electoral history |
|---|---|---|---|
District established July 1, 1925
| Ralph L. Criswell (Vermont Square) | Republican | July 1, 1925 – June 30, 1927 | Redistricted from the at-large district and re-elected in 1925. Lost re-election. |
| Howard W. Davis (Vermont Square) | Republican | July 1, 1927 – June 30, 1935 | Elected in 1927. Re-elected in 1929. Re-elected in 1931. Re-elected in 1933. Retired. |
| Will H. Kindig (Vermont Square) | Democratic | July 1, 1935 – June 30, 1937 | Elected in 1935. Lost re-election. |
| Howard W. Davis (Vermont Square) | Republican | July 1, 1937 – June 30, 1939 | Elected in 1937. Lost re-election. |
| Carl C. Rasmussen (Leimert Park) | Democratic | July 1, 1939 – June 30, 1947 | Elected in 1939. Elected in 1943. Lost re-election. |
| Don A. Allen (Leimert Park) | Democratic | July 1, 1947 – September 13, 1956 | Elected in 1947. Re-elected in 1949. Re-elected in 1951. Re-elected in 1953. Re-elected in 1955. Resigned when elected to the California State Assembly. |
| Vacant | | September 13, 1956 – July 1, 1957 | |
| James C. Corman (Van Nuys) | Democratic | July 1, 1957 – January 3, 1961 | Elected in 1957. Resigned when elected to the U.S. House of Representatives. |
| Vacant | | January 3, 1961 – June 1, 1961 | |
| Ernani Bernardi (Van Nuys) | Democratic | June 1, 1961 – June 30, 1993 | Elected to finish Corman's term. Re-elected in 1965. Re-elected in 1969. Re-elected in 1973. Re-elected in 1977. Re-elected in 1981. Re-elected in 1985. Re-elected in 1989. Re-elected in 1993. Retired to run for Mayor of Los Angeles. |
| Richard Alarcon (Northridge) | Democratic | July 1, 1993 – January 3, 1999 | Elected in 1993. Re-elected in 1997. Resigned when elected to the California State Senate. |
| Vacant | | January 3, 1999 – June 8, 1999 | |
| Alex Padilla (Pacoima) | Democratic | June 8, 1999 – December 4, 2006 | Appointed to finish Alarcon's term. Elected in 2001. Re-elected in 2005. Resigned when elected to the California State Senate. |
| Vacant | | December 4, 2006 – March 16, 2007 | |
| Vacant | | March 16, 2007 – July 1, 2007 | Member-elect Richard Alarcon appointed as caretaker until certification of election. |
| Richard Alarcon (Northridge) | Democratic | July 1, 2007 – June 30, 2013 | Elected in 2007. Re-elected in 2009. Retired due to term limits. |
| Felipe Fuentes (Sylmar) | Democratic | July 1, 2013 – September 30, 2016 | Elected in 2013. Resigned to become a lobbyist. |
| Vacant | | September 30, 2016 – July 1, 2017 | Council President Herb Wesson appointed as caretaker until next election. |
| Monica Rodriguez (Mission Hills) | Democratic | July 1, 2017 – present | Elected in 2017. Re-elected in 2022. Re-elected in 2026. |
