= Carl C. Rasmussen =

American politician (1901–1952)

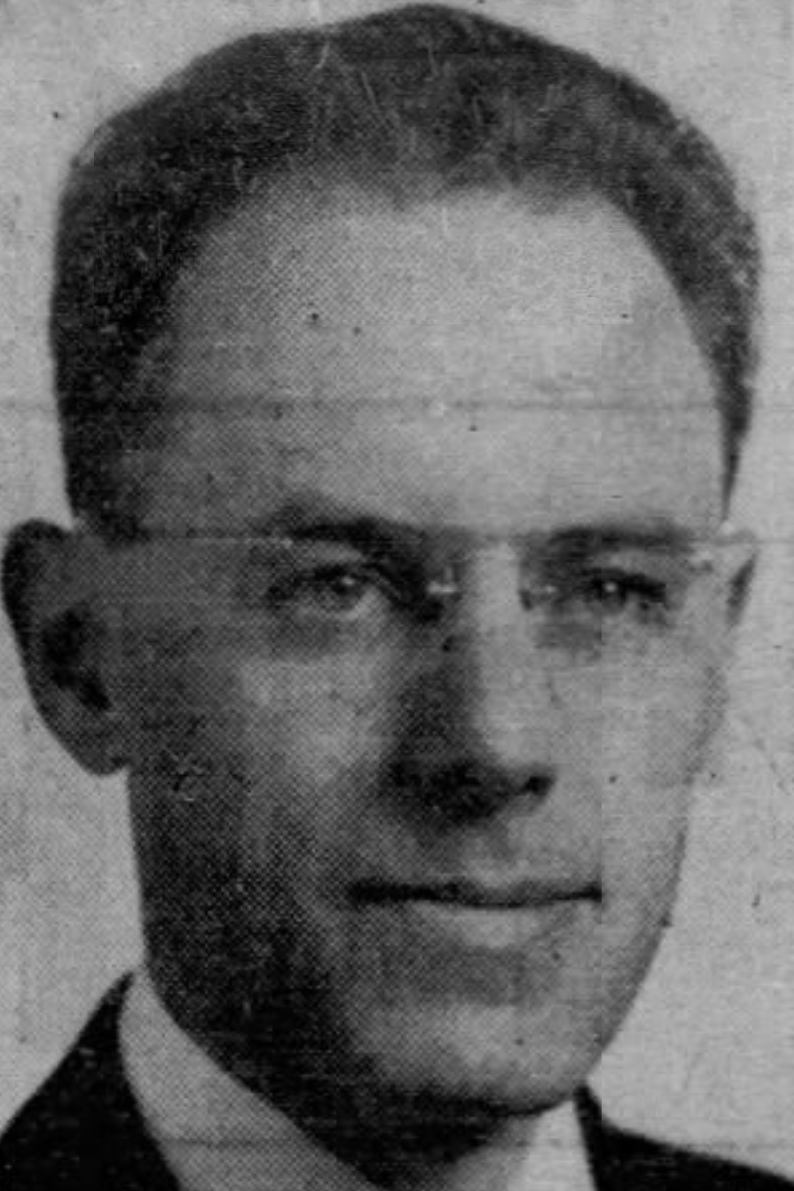
- Rasmussen in 1943

Member of the Los Angeles City Council for the 7th district
- In office July 1, 1939 – June 30, 1947
- Preceded by: Howard W. Davis
- Succeeded by: Don A. Allen

Personal details
- Born: May 12, 1901; Tyler, Minnesota, U.S.
- Died: November 14, 1952 (aged 51); Burbank, California, U.S.
- Political party: Democratic
- Spouse: Clara Margaret (m. 1922)
- Children: 3

Carl Christian Rasmussen (May 12, 1901 – November 14, 1952) was a Lutheran minister who was also a member of the Los Angeles, California, City Council between 1939 and 1947.

== Biography ==
Rasmussen was born on May 12, 1901, in Tyler, Lincoln County, Minnesota, the son of Rasmus S. and Mary Elizabeth Rasmussen, both of Denmark.

When Carl Christian was sixteen years old, he borrowed "a hundred dollars" to attend a barber college, after which he used the proceeds from barbering to finish South High School (Minneapolis) and Minneapolis Business College. He was first a retail clerk, then a salesman for a Minneapolis hardware firm and then purchasing agent for a wholesale house. He worked for a subsidiary of International Harvester as a traveler in three Midwestern states and then in 1923 became part owner of a retail hardware business in Lakeside, California.

He studied for the Danish Lutheran ministry at Grand View College in Des Moines, Iowa, from 1927 to 1930, after which he held three pastorates—in Viborg, South Dakota; Salinas, California, and finally the Emanuel Danish Lutheran Church of Los Angeles.

Rasmussen was married to Clara Margaret of Arco, Minnesota, on May 21, 1922. They had three children—Miriam Eileen, Ralph Christian and Alvin or Alvind Carl—and lived in Los Angeles at 4308 Third Avenue in a Leimert Park area house he owned adjoining his church.

He died at the age of 51 on November 14, 1952, in his home at 1019 Verdugo Road, Burbank.

== City Council ==
=== Elections ===
In the early 1940s, the Los Angeles City Council District 7 was bounded on the west by Crenshaw Boulevard, on the north by Exposition Boulevard, on the east by the city boundary with Vernon and on the south by Vernon Avenue. In 1947 it was noted that the district's population was "nearly 50 per cent Negro."

Rasmussen's predecessor, Howard W. Davis, had been the representative in the 7th almost continuously since 1927, but in February 1939, a grand jury, at the instigation of District Attorney Buron Fitts, voted 38 charges of misconduct against him. After trial, Superior Judge Raymond McIntosh ruled in favor of Davis and exonerated him.

In the primary election the Tuesday after the court decision, Davis was eliminated from the field, placing third after Negro newspaper publisher Leon H. Washington Jr., first, and Rasmussen, second. Rasmussen won the seat over Washington in the May final election.

Two years later, Davis attempted a comeback, but Rasmussen beat him in the final. In 1943 Rasmussen won a primary-election victory over Charlotta Bass, also a Negro newspaper publisher, and in 1945 he gained another victory over Mrs. Bass, this time in the final. He lost his councilmanic seat to Don A. Allen in 1947.

=== Positions ===
Moral Rearmament. Rasmussen's request that the council ask Mayor Fletcher Bowron to proclaim a Moral Rearmament Week failed in April 1940, with Councilman Arthur E. Briggs declaring that the program was "not a governmental matter, but one of personal interest and entirely outside the sphere" of the council.

Negro council district. He proposed that the 8th District be enlarged with slices from two other districts so that it would have a majority of Negroes, who, he said in December 1940, represented 7% of the city population and who should "be given representation according to their own desire, in the interest of democracy." The proposal was rejected the next week, although Assembly Member Augustus Hawkins appeared at the council meeting to speak in favor of it.

Communists. Rasmussen at first opposed an April 1941 proposal by Roy Hampton that "numerous complaints of Communistic activities by city employees have been made known to Councilmen, and that a fair and impartial investigation should be conducted." Rasmussen said it was a "dastardly plot" against his reelection campaign and that he was "sick and tired of being tagged as a Communist." He later voted for the probe.

In 1947 Rasmussen joined with Councilmen Lloyd Davies and Ed J. Davenport in advocating the outlawing of the Communist Party.

Made in Japan. In March 1942 he introduced a proposal making it unlawful to sell "patriotic emblems" like American flags which actually had been made in Japan unless express permission was given by the Social Service Commission. The motion passed unanimously.

Slapped. Rasmussen was struck in the face by Council Member Ira J. McDonald over a dispute about raising city wages. They shook hands later in the same December 1942 meeting, but McDonald nevertheless issued a press statement saying that:

Councilman Rasmussen is well known for bringing personalities into an argument and making insulting remarks. A few days ago he called me a vile and profane name. Today he again endeavored to make insulting remarks to me. I thought it time to show my disapproval and took direct action which any red-blooded man would do.

Horse meat. During a City Council discussion in the midst of World War II meat rationing over whether to adopt an ordinance requiring that charcoal be added to all horse meat offered for sale in the city, Rasmussen revealed he had served "dinner filets" made of horse meat to his guests and "they said they were delicious." He added: "I gave one of the steaks to the Mayor [Bowron], but he said his wife was out of town and he had to feed it to the dog."

Bill of Rights. 1943 He fought for a December 1943 resolution honoring Bill of Rights Week that would put the council on record as opposed to discrimination "against minority groups" and encouraging broadest "racial" unity. Other members of the council objected to those two terms, and, after a two-hour debate, they were eventually deleted and the motion was adopted, 10–5, in opposition to any form of discrimination and in favor of general unity and tolerance.

Preceded by Howard W. Davis	Los Angeles City Council; 7th District; 1939–1947	Succeeded by Don A. Allen
