= Howard W. Davis =

American politician (1885–1959)

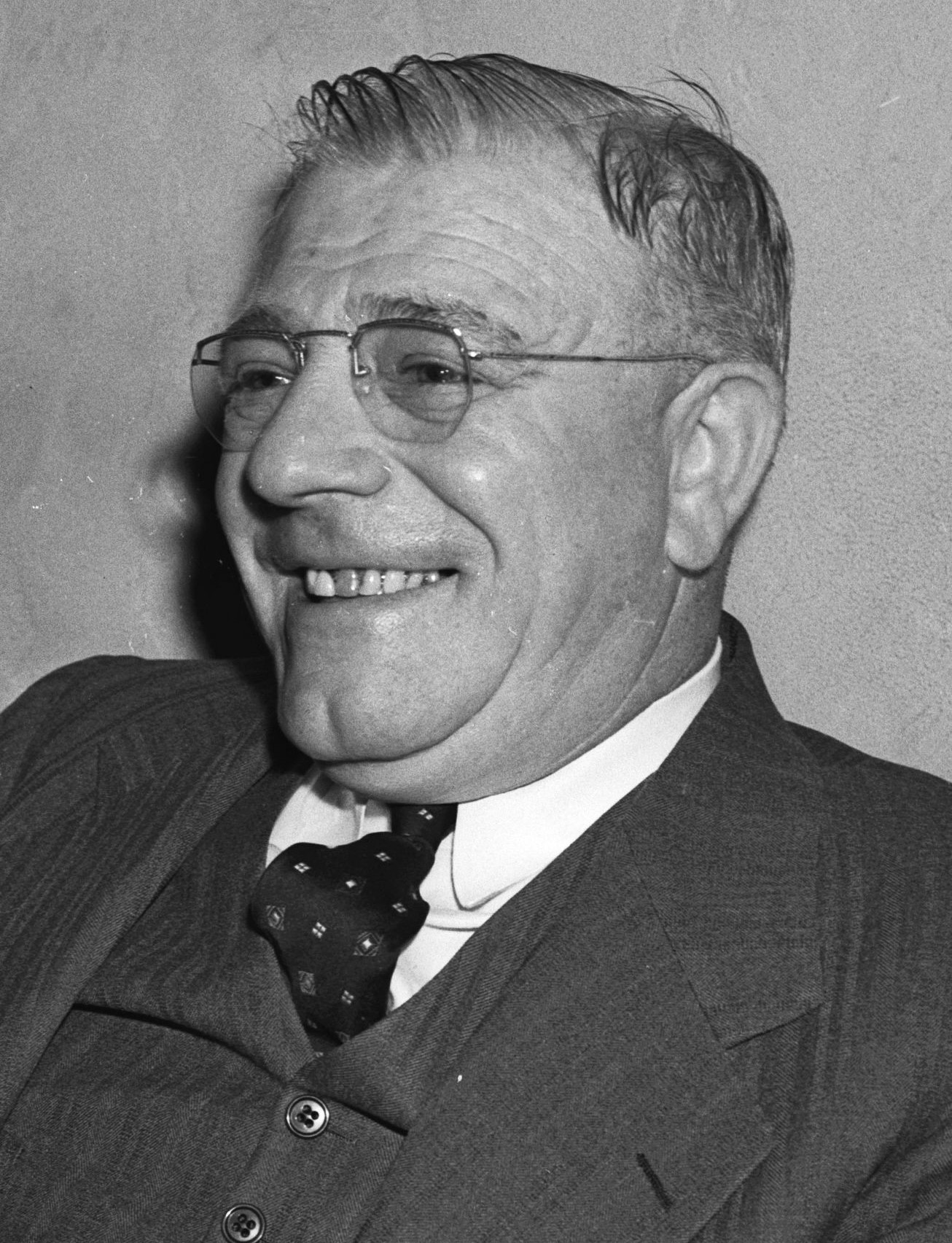
- Davis in 1938

Member of the California State Assembly from the 73rd district
- In office January 5, 1925 – January 7, 1929
- Preceded by: Elmer P. Bromley
- Succeeded by: James E. Stockwell

President of the Los Angeles City Council
- In office July 1, 1933 – June 30, 1935
- Preceded by: Charles Hiram Randall
- Succeeded by: Robert L. Burns

Member of the Los Angeles City Council from the 7th district
- In office July 1, 1927 – June 30, 1935
- Preceded by: Ralph Luther Criswell
- Succeeded by: Will H. Kindig
- In office July 1, 1937 – June 30, 1939
- Preceded by: Will H. Kindig
- Succeeded by: Carl C. Rasmussen

Personal details
- Born: November 13, 1885 Pennsylvania, US
- Died: December 13, 1959 (aged 74) Coronado, California, US
- Party: Republican
- Spouse: Marion
- Children: Howard W. Jr. and Mary Jo

Howard Woster Davis (November 13, 1885 – December 13, 1959) was a member of the California State Assembly for two years and of the Los Angeles City Council for 16 years. He was indicted on charges of accepting bribes to influence his actions as a city official but was cleared on one count and never tried on the others, which were dismissed.

== Biography ==
Davis, the son of John C. Davis, was born in 1885 in Pennsylvania and moved to Los Angeles in 1906. He had a brother, George E. His wife was Marion Davis, and they lived at 314 West Santa Barbara Avenue. Their son was Howard W. Jr., and their daughter was Mary Jo, who married Charles L. Harris in 1938. A real estate man, Howard Sr. was a charter member and past president of the Southside Chamber of Commerce and a member of Al Malaikah Shrine Temple. In 1924 he was a member of the board of governors of the Los Angeles Realty Board

He died December 13, 1959, in Coronado, California, at the age of 76.

== Political career ==
=== 1923–26 ===
Davis's first bid for public office was in August 1923, when he cross-filed for the State Assembly in the 73rd District primary election. On the Republican ballot he received 2,554 votes to 1,188 for Eugene C. Jennings, 690 for George L. Hager, 401 for M.H. Broyles, and 226 for James G. Edmonds. On the Democratic ballot he received 111 votes against 46 for Hager. In the November final election, running as both a Democrat and a Republican, he defeated Sidney P. Dones, an independent, and Leo J. Wright, a Socialist.

Davis began his campaign for City Council in Los Angeles City Council District 7 in March 1925. In the May primary he came in second with 2,216 votes to 3,502 for Ralph Luther Criswell, followed by George F. Ryan, 927; S.B.W. May, 651; Edward J. Nagle, 479; and Eldon C. Rookledge, 236.

The municipal general election campaign in 1925 was highlighted by an attack upon Criswell for having registered in the Socialist Party in January 1918 but afterwards changing his registration to Republican and notifying the Socialist Party "that he was still in sympathy with the principles of Socialism and felt that he could do more outside of the party to forward them than as a member." Nevertheless, Criswell was elected in the November balloting, 3,477 votes to Davis's 2,482.

Retaining his seat in the Assembly, Davis in 1926 became chairman of a group of California Real Estate Association members in the chamber, working to amend a Real Estate Act that had been adopted in 1919. In 1926 he was unopposed for re-election.

=== 1927–37 ===
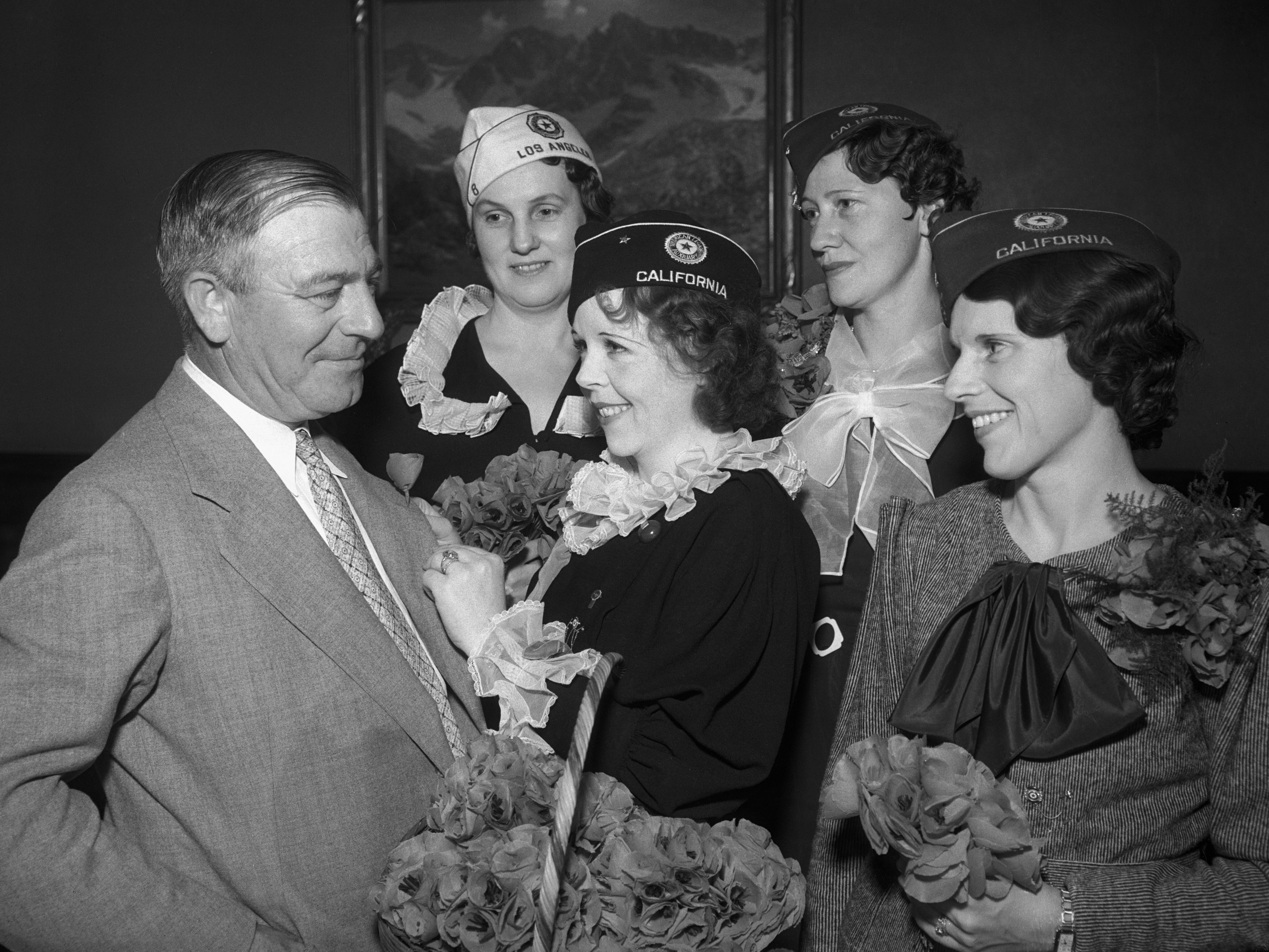
Davis with the American Legion Auxiliary on Memorial Day, 1934.

In May 1927, Davis was again a candidate for the 7th District City Council seat, winning outright in the primary, with 3,325 votes to Criswell's 2,467 and 422 for George W. Grimmer and 130 for A. Kreling. He was reelected also in 1927, with E.J. Nagle as the runner-up.

In January 1930, Davis and seven other council members who had voted in favor of granting a rock-crushing permit in the Santa Monica Mountains were unsuccessfully targeted for recall on the grounds that the eight

have conspired with ... Alphonzo Bell, Samuel Traylor and Chapin A. Day, all multi-millionaires, to grant this group a special spot zoning permit to crush and ship ... from the high-class residential section of Santa Monica, limestone and rock for cement.

Davis was among six council members who in May 1930 unsuccessfully opposed allocating funds to make a study of leveling Bunker Hill, "which stands as a hindrance to traffic and a bar to development in the northwestern downtown territory."

In 1931 Davis won re-election in the May primary with 4,466 votes against three other candidates — Criswell, 2,995; Nagle, 908; and George Grant, 462.

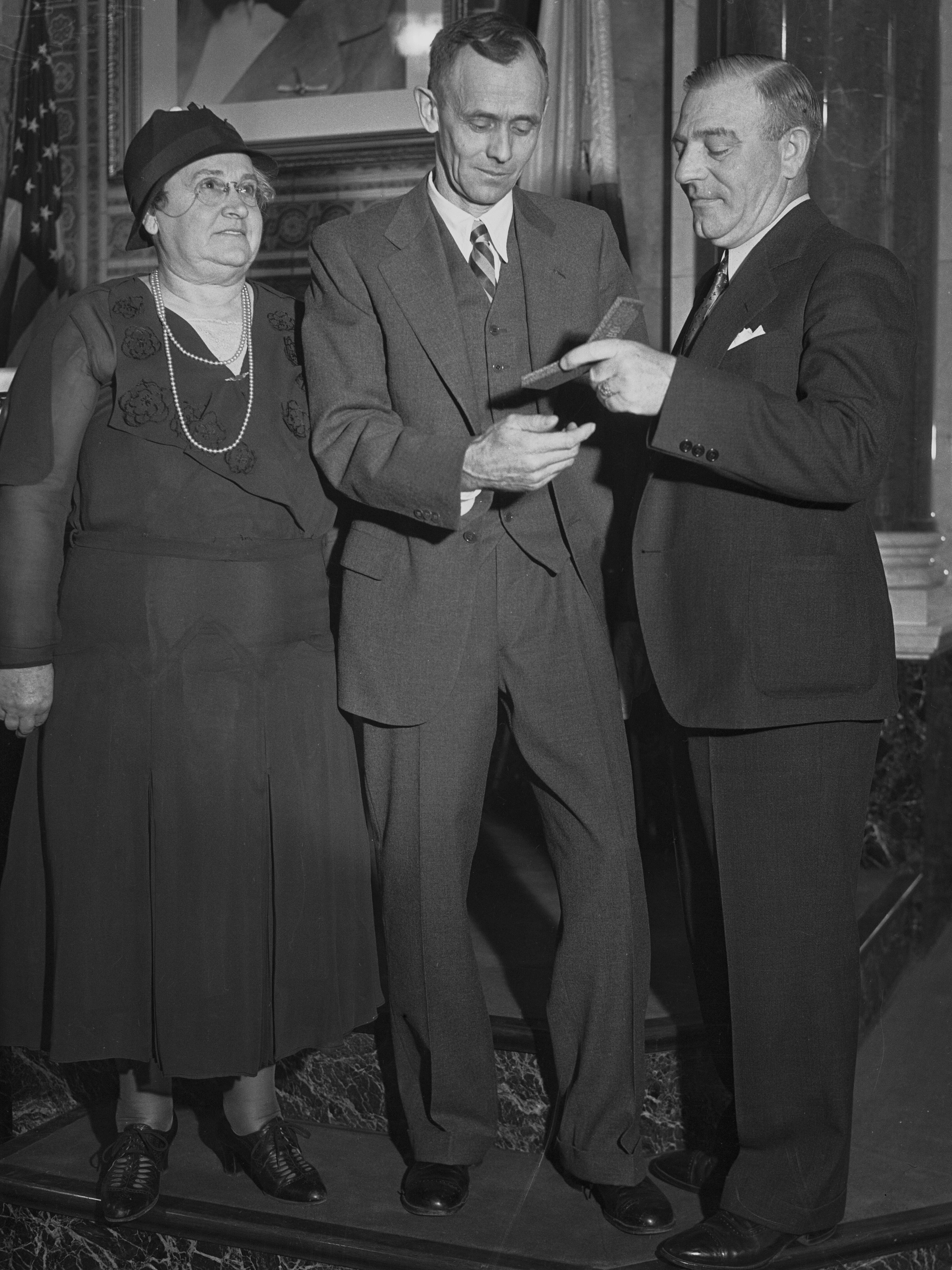
John Hoffman receives a medal from Davis and Helen A. French, 1934.

In April 1933, Davis wrote a lengthy article in the Los Angeles Times ("as told to Mary June Burton") detailing the joys and sorrows of being a City Council member. He said:

... I enjoy it. I think politics is the most intriguing game in the world. I enjoy the maneuvering necessary to put through an ordinance I believe will help my district and the city, and sometimes the difficulties and red tape only increase the zest. ... Today it seems to be the custom for public officeholders to deny they're politicians. I'm a politician.

Davis was reelected to a two-year term in May 1933 by a vote of 9,361 to 3,386 for Bert L. Farmer, a former Assembly member and a former Council member (1917–21); 1,417 for Alex Salot, a real estate dealer; and 1,061 for C.C. Terzo, a haberdasher. In July 1933 Davis, who by then was the "senior member" of the council, was elected its president over George W.C. Baker by a vote of 8 to 7.

Davis took what was called a "voluntary retirement" in 1935 and did not run for reelection that year. Instead, Will H. Kindig won the election over Dwight Baker, 8,077 to 7,957. Two years later, however, Davis was back, winning in the May 1937 primary election against Kindig, 8,010 to 6,705. Kindig had been elected in 1935 with support from the "radical element" in the End Poverty in California movement, but lost it during the course of his term. Even before Davis was seated, he was named by the council as what some called a "lobbyist" for the city in Sacramento, seeking action on legislation that would benefit Los Angeles, particularly the distribution of gasoline-tax revenues.

=== 1938–39 ===
On December 15, 1938, Davis and Howard Baker, a former business associate, were indicted on two counts of bribery conspiracy in connection with the obtaining of spot zoning permits for operating in the rich oil fields of the Wilmington district near Long Beach. He was arrested and booked into the county jail but was later released on bond.

In February 1939, a grand jury, at the instigation of District Attorney Buron Fitts, also voted 38 charges of misconduct, in a rare move designed to force Davis from office. Checks in payment, one of them made out to Davis's wife, were displayed in evidence at a non-jury trial before Superior Court Judge Raymond McIntosh. Prosecutors claimed that Davis received "nearly $20,000 in special fees for his efforts." Davis replied that the fees were for his "special knowledge" and that, in any event, he received them during the two years he was not on the council. McIntosh, a visiting jurist from Sierra County, ruled in favor of Davis and exonerated him, and the prosecution thereupon dropped the other charges against Davis and Baker as well. When Davis, who had been on leave, returned to his flower-bedecked council desk the next day, he was cheered and named to lead the council as president pro tem for the session.

In the primary election the Tuesday after the court decision, Davis was eliminated from the field, placing third after Negro newspaper publisher Leon H. Washington Jr. and Carl C. Rasmussen. The votes were Washington, 5,011; Rasmussen, 3,402; Davis, 3,049; M.T. Faulkes, 1,756; Ray West, 1,242; Edward J. Nagle, 974; Scott Weller, 604; John R. Edwards, 507; Everett K. Miller, 291; and Jay W. Swander, 161. Rasmussen won the seat in the November final election.

=== 1941–59 ===
Davis again challenged Rasmussen in 1941 and came in second, by a vote of 1,865 for the incumbent councilman, 1,330 for Davis, 240 for John Ferry and 215 for Harold D. Motter. Rasmussen won the final vote in May, 11,726 to 8,340 for Davis.

He tried one more time to unseat Rasmussen, in April 1947, this time coming in fourth. The votes were 7,097 for Rasmussen, 5,528 for Don A. Allen, 5,211 for Jonathan Lyle Caston, 2,536 for Davis, 1,074 for James F. Collins, 863 for Vince Monroe Townsend Jr., 261 for Harold Draper and 200 for Richard H. Alvord.

Davis's final public notice was a letter in the Times on June 8, 1954, when he urged a pay raise for City Council members. When he died in 1959, the council adjourned "out of respect" to him.

Preceded by Ralph Luther Criswell	Los Angeles City Council; 7th District; 1927–1935	Succeeded by Will H. Kindig

Preceded by Will H. Kindig	Los Angeles City Council; 7th District; 1937–1939	Succeeded by Carl C. Rasmussen

Preceded by Charles Hiram Randall	President of the Los Angeles City Council; 1933–1935	Succeeded by Robert L. Burns
