= Will H. Kindig =

American politician from California

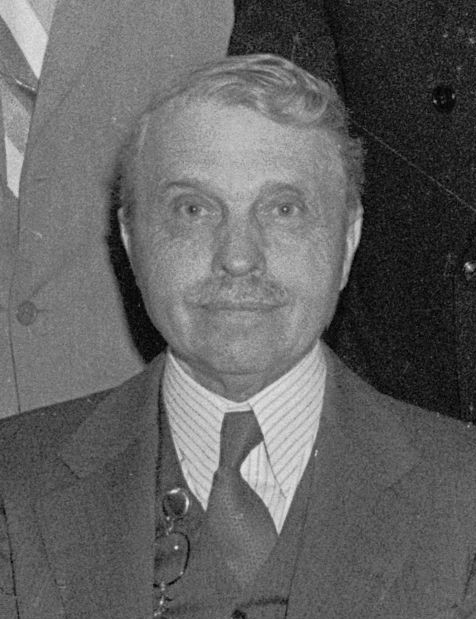
- Kindig in 1935

Member of the Los Angeles City Council from the 7th district
- In office July 1, 1935 – June 30, 1937
- Preceded by: Howard W. Davis
- Succeeded by: Howard W. Davis

Personal details
- Born: February 7, 1869 Goshen, Indiana, U.S.
- Died: September 18, 1946 (aged 77) Los Angeles, California, U.S.
- Party: Democratic

William Harvey Kindig (February 7, 1869 – September 18, 1946), was a candidate for California state controller in 1934, Los Angeles City Council member from 1935 to 1937 and a sponsor of the Ham and Eggs movement for old-age pensions in California in 1939.

== Biography ==
Kindig was born in Goshen, Indiana on February 7, 1869. He moved to California around 1905 and may have operated the Hotel Sierra Madre "at the foot of Mount Wilson" in 1909. In 1935, he published a book titled ABC of Metaphysics, Being a Compilation From Radio Talks on Philosophical Subjects by the Author During 1934 to 1935... He was a broker but was also known as an "authority on international finance."

Kindig was one of the organizers of the Braille Institute. His home was at 4125 South Figueroa Street in today's Vermont Square area. He died at the age of 77 in September 1946, leaving a widow, Margaret.

== Public affairs ==
=== Controller candidate ===
Kindig was the EPIC-endorsed candidate for California State Controller in the 1934 election, but he was beaten in the Democratic Party primary by the incumbent, Ray L. Riley, a registered Republican, who had 317,094 votes to Kindig's 296,758. Kindig did not cross-file in the Republican race.

=== City Council ===
==== Elections ====
Kindig ran for the Los Angeles City Council District 7 seat in 1935 after the incumbent, Howard W. Davis, decided to take a break from politics. The district was bounded on the east by Alameda Avenue, on the west by Crenshaw Boulevard, on the north by Exposition Boulevard and on the south by Vernon Avenue. With the support of the End Poverty in California movement, he beat Dwight Baker by a vote of 8,077 to 7,597 that year.

Davis returned in 1937, though, and recaptured his old position by a vote of 8,010 for himself and 6,705 for Kindig. It was said in advance of the 1937 election that Kindig had lost the "virile, aggressive support of the entire liberal movement."

==== Positions ====
Advertising: Kindig scoffed at the idea that the city's legal advertising should be printed in local community newspapers. "I think this argument that the public benefit is to be served by using these newspapers is a lot of camouflage," he told the council when it discussed the matter.

Bookmaking: Eying the "stream of gold," or money receipts, at nearby Santa Anita Racetrack, Kindig, along with other council members, urged the city attorney to hasten a legal opinion whether the city could tax the illegal bookmakers operating in Los Angeles. "The racing season is on, it will soon be over, and if we can legitimately get any revenue from the business of book-making, I think we should lose no time on it," he said.

==== Radio stations ====
Kindig, who besides being a councilman was also treasurer of the Democratic State Central Committee, asked the Federal Communications Commission to give him a license to operate a radio station in Los Angeles to reflect the "liberal and progressive" side of politics. He was supported in his request by fellow Council Members G. Vernon Bennett, Parley Parker Christensen and James M. Hyde and by County Supervisor John Anson Ford. The FCC turned him down by a 2–1 vote.

=== Ham and Eggs ===
Kindig was one of the organizers of a proposed California pension plan known as the Ham and Eggs Movement or "Thirty Dollars Every Thursday" plan. It was he, along with Roy and Lawrence Allen and Roy G. Owens, all of Los Angeles, who submitted a revised version of the plan in 1939 after voters turned down a different version in the 1938 election. The plan the voters faced in 1940 would have the governor name an administrator for the program — according to the proposed initiative legislation he would have to choose between "Roy G. Owens or Will H. Kindig," who would serve until the general election of 1944. The two men were roundly condemned by the nationally known conservative commentator Westbrook Pegler as "adventurers in emotional politics." The proposal was defeated by the electorate.

Preceded by Howard W. Davis	Los Angeles City Council; 7th District; 1935–1937	Succeeded by Howard W. Davis
