= Samuel Rees =

American politician (1846-1914)

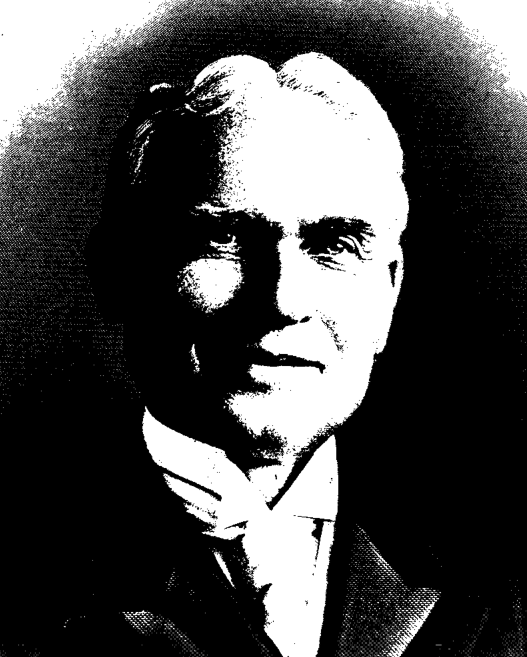

Member of the Los Angeles City Council for the 9th ward
- In office December 5, 1890 – December 12, 1892
- Preceded by: Robert E. Wirsching
- Succeeded by: George W. Campbell

Personal details
- Born: October 3, 1846 Staffordshire, England
- Died: October 24, 1914 (aged 68) Los Angeles, California
- Party: Republican

Samuel Rees (October 3, 1846 – October 24, 1914) was a pioneer businessman and property developer in Los Angeles, California, where he was a member of the City Council and of the Board of Public Works in 1891–92.

== Personal ==
Rees was born on October 3, 1846, in Staffordshire, England, the son of William Rees and Jane Stanton. He received left school early in order to go to work, and at age 21 he emigrated to America. He was married to Lydia Dangerfield of Staffordshire in 1869, and they had seven children, Lillie (Mrs. E.A. Guest), Rosa F. (Mrs. A.I. Smith), Minnie E. (Mrs. F.C. Elliott), Ethel R. (Mrs. Searle), Harry S., Walter N. and Samuel C. His wife was treasurer of a Boyle Heights women's suffrage club in 1896.

He died in Los Angeles on October 24, 1914, after an illness of "several months, ... attributed to liver trouble."

== Vocation ==
Rees began work in America as a clerk for the Pennsylvania Railroad in Pittsburgh, Pennsylvania, for seven years before settling in Los Angeles, where he was a bookkeeper for a firm of blacksmiths and wheelwrights. He then entered into business with Robert E. Wirsching: They did general blacksmithing and built wagons "in a large shop on Aliso Street." The firm sustained losses of $15,000 in the floods of 1884, but it rebounded and became successful, moving to larger quarters on Los Angeles Street, where it sold "modern agricultural implements."

He became prosperous by buying unimproved land "remote from the business and residential areas of the city," including 17 acres, at $20 an acre, in an area that later became Boyle Heights," where he built his home.

== Community ==
Rees was on both the Los Angeles City Council and the city Board of Public Works in 1891–92. While on those bodies, he was able to increase the size of Hollenbeck Park from the original 3.5-acre gift to about 30 acres.

Rees was a founder of the Hollenbeck Heights Methodist Church. "A clever and caustic rhymester, with a flair for the caustic, Mr. Rees is said to have enlivened numerous council and business meetings with verse about his associates and subjects before the board." He was the author of newspaper articles concerning the 1893 World's Columbian Exposition in Chicago. He was a Republican, a Mason and a member of the Pioneer Society of Southern California.

In 1909 he joined with others, including Griffith J. Griffith, to work within a Prison Reform League on behalf of a more humane treatment of prisoners, including the abolition of capital punishment.
