= 1915 Los Angeles mayoral election =

- May 4, 1915 and June 1, 1915
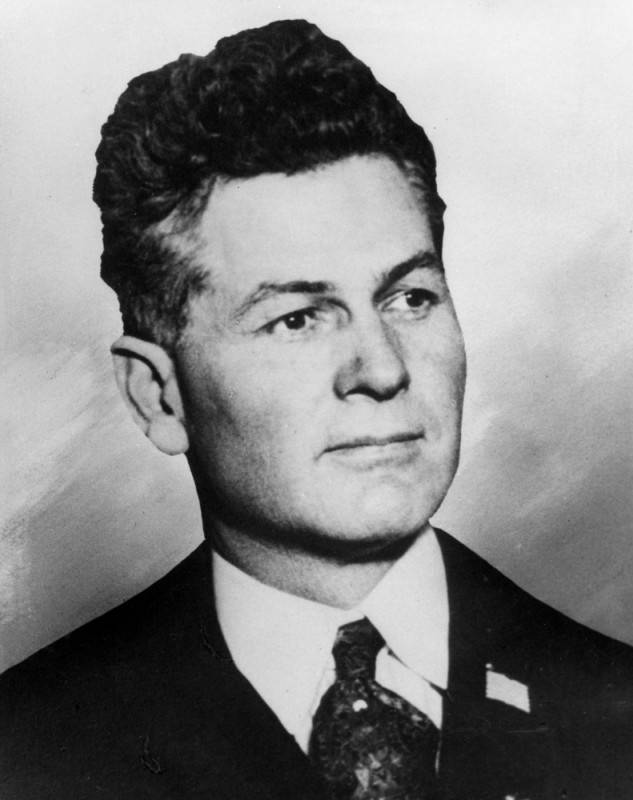

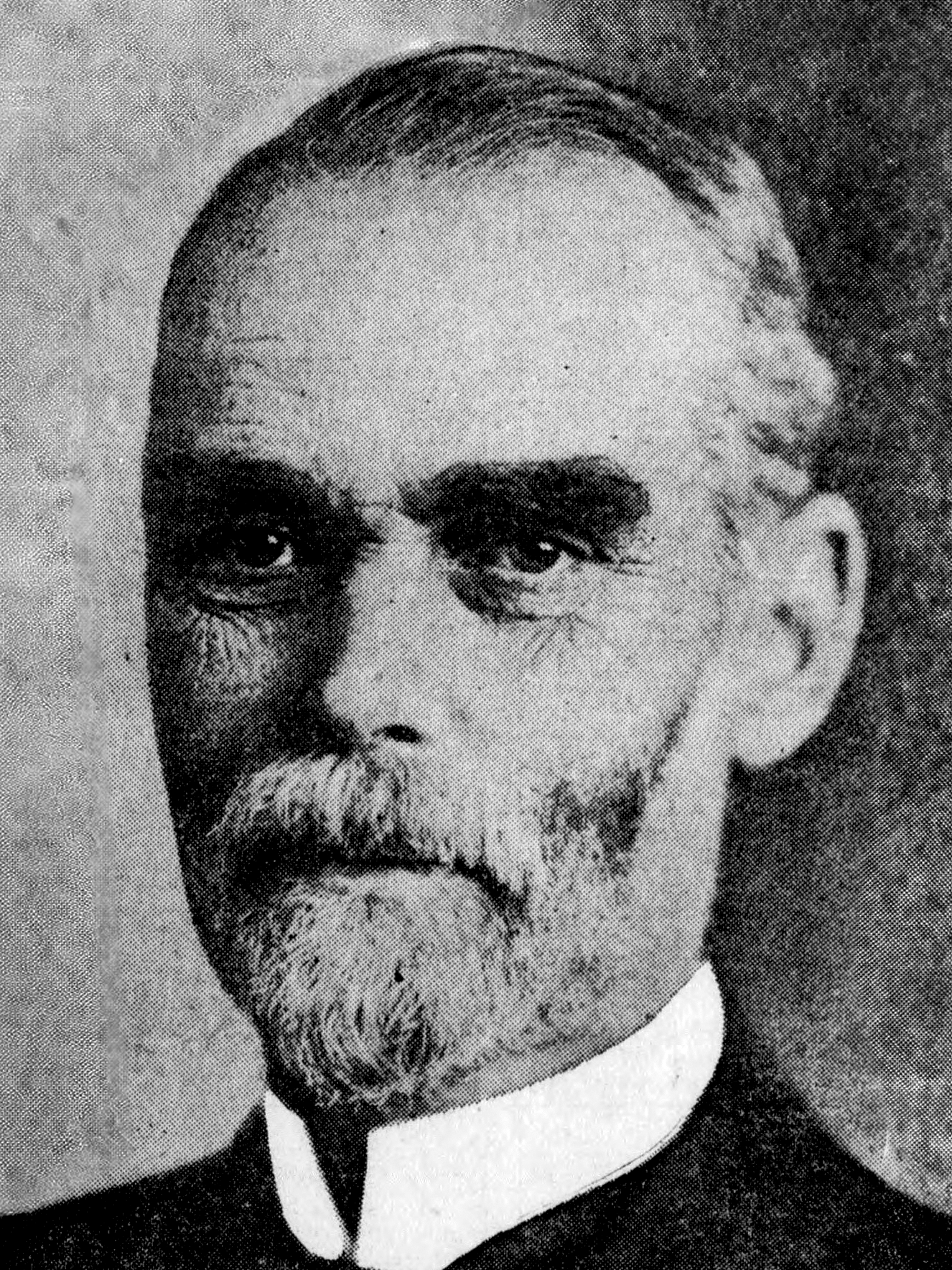

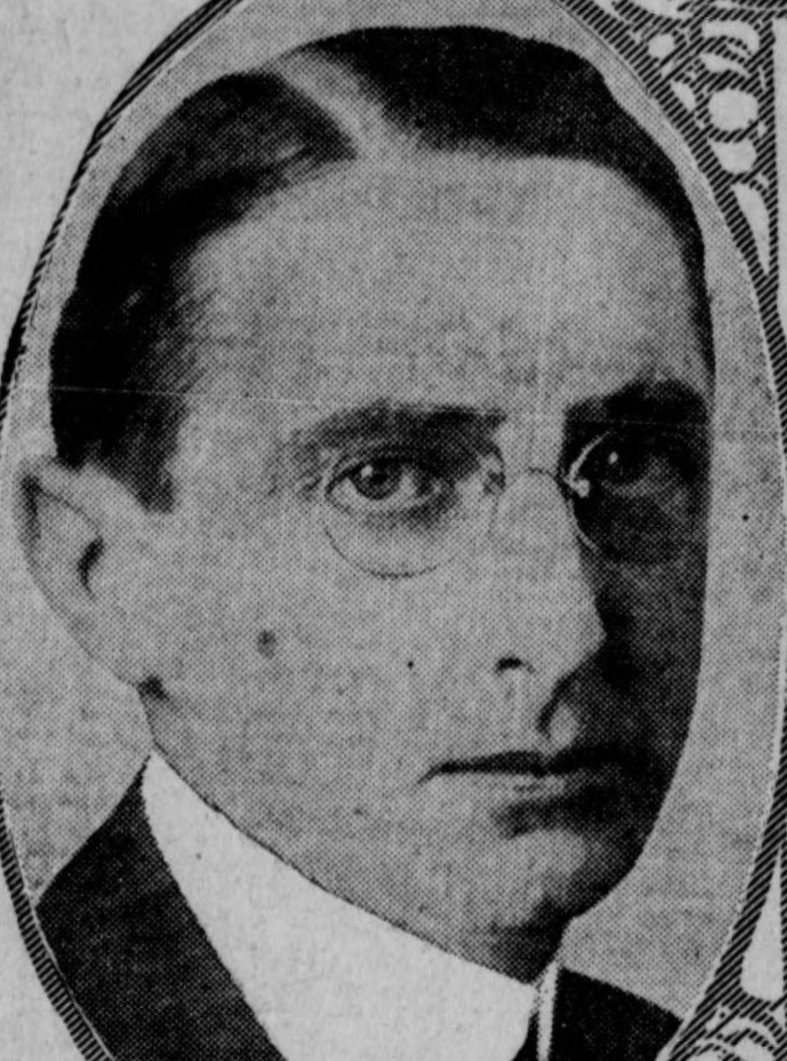

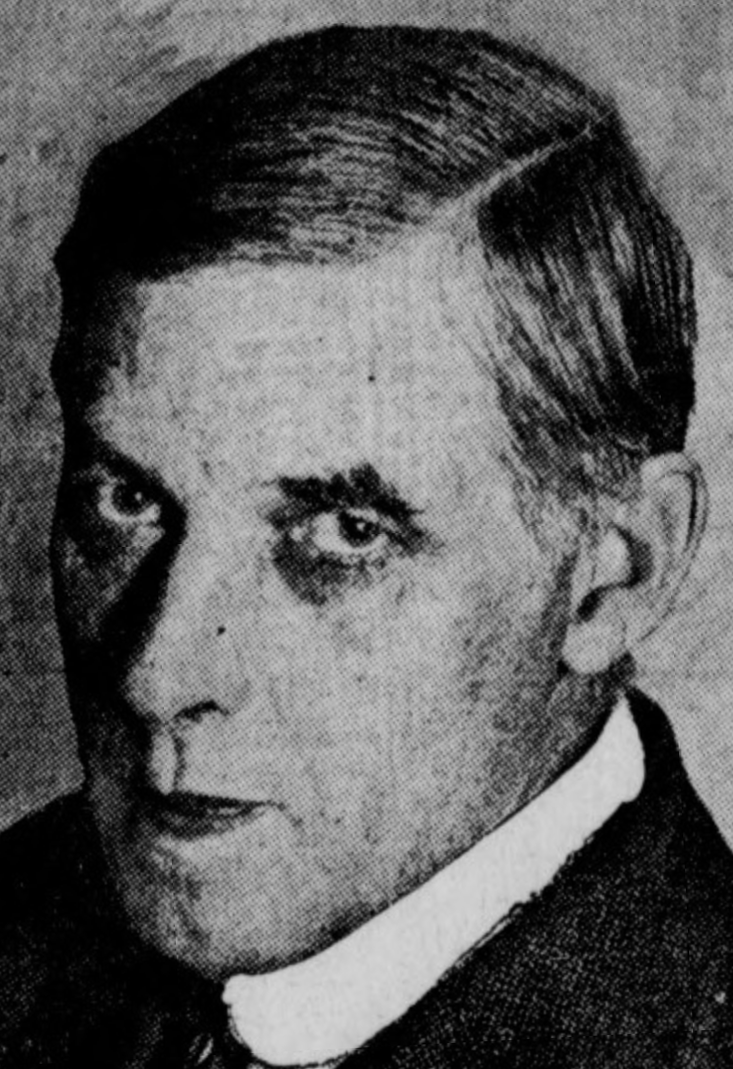

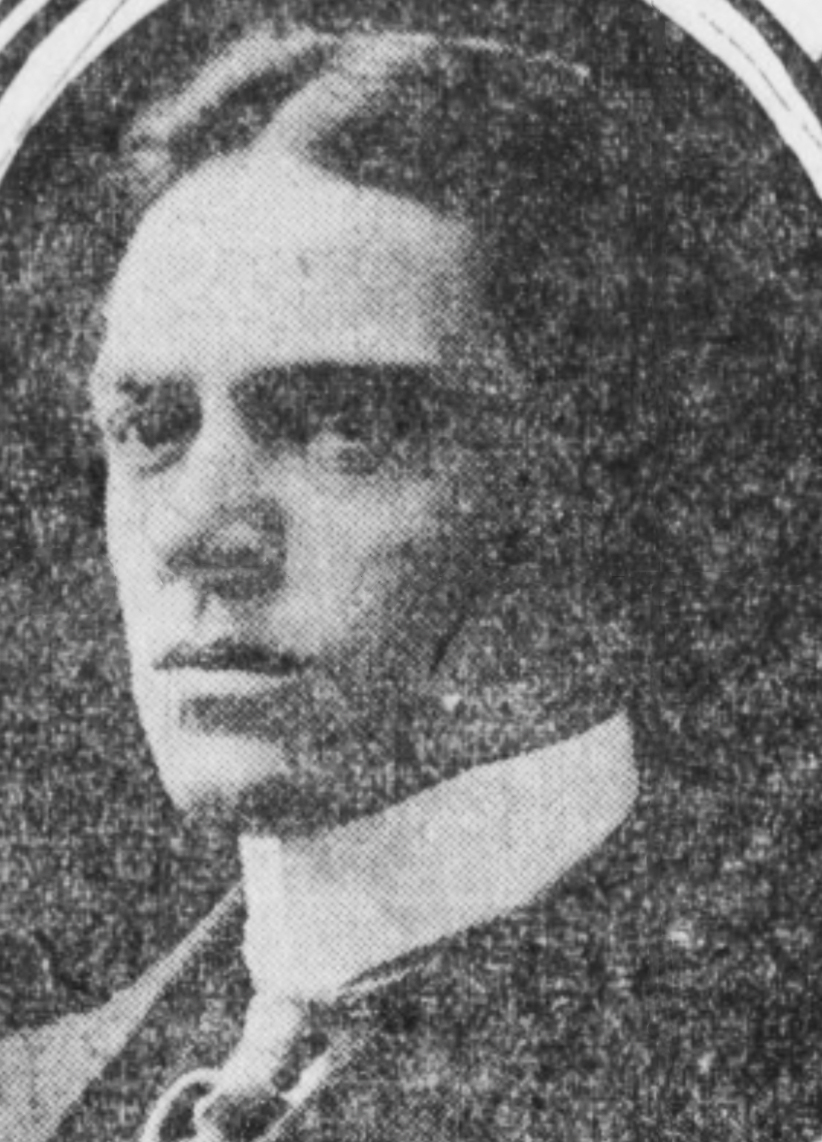
| Candidate | Charles E. Sebastian | Frederick J. Whiffen | Robert M. Allan |
| First round | 28,040; 38.91% | 14,591; 20.25% | 12,573; 17.45% |
| Runoff | 46,498; 52.55% | 41,989; 47.45% | Eliminated |
| Candidate | Ralph Luther Criswell | D. C. Casselman |
| First round | 7,881; 10.94% | 5,403; 7.50% |
| Runoff | Eliminated | Eliminated |
Mayor before election
Henry H. Rose
Elected Mayor
Charles E. Sebastian

The 1915 Los Angeles mayoral election took place on May 4, 1915, with a run-off election on June 1, 1915. Charles E. Sebastian was elected.

== Results ==
=== Primary election ===
Los Angeles mayoral primary election, May 4, 1915
| Candidate | Votes | % |
|---|---|---|
| Charles E. Sebastian | 28,040 | 38.91 |
| Frederick J. Whiffen | 14,591 | 20.25 |
| Robert M. Allan | 12,573 | 17.45 |
| Ralph Luther Criswell | 7,881 | 10.94 |
| D. C. Casselman | 5,403 | 7.50 |
| H. S. McCallum | 3,570 | 4.95 |
| Total votes | 72,058 | 100.00 |

=== General election ===
Los Angeles mayoral general election, June 1, 1915
| Candidate | Votes | % |
|---|---|---|
| Charles E. Sebastian | 46,498 | 52.55 |
| Frederick J. Whiffen | 41,989 | 47.45 |
| Total votes | 88,487 | 100.00 |
