= 1937 Los Angeles mayoral election =

- April 6, 1937 and May 4, 1937
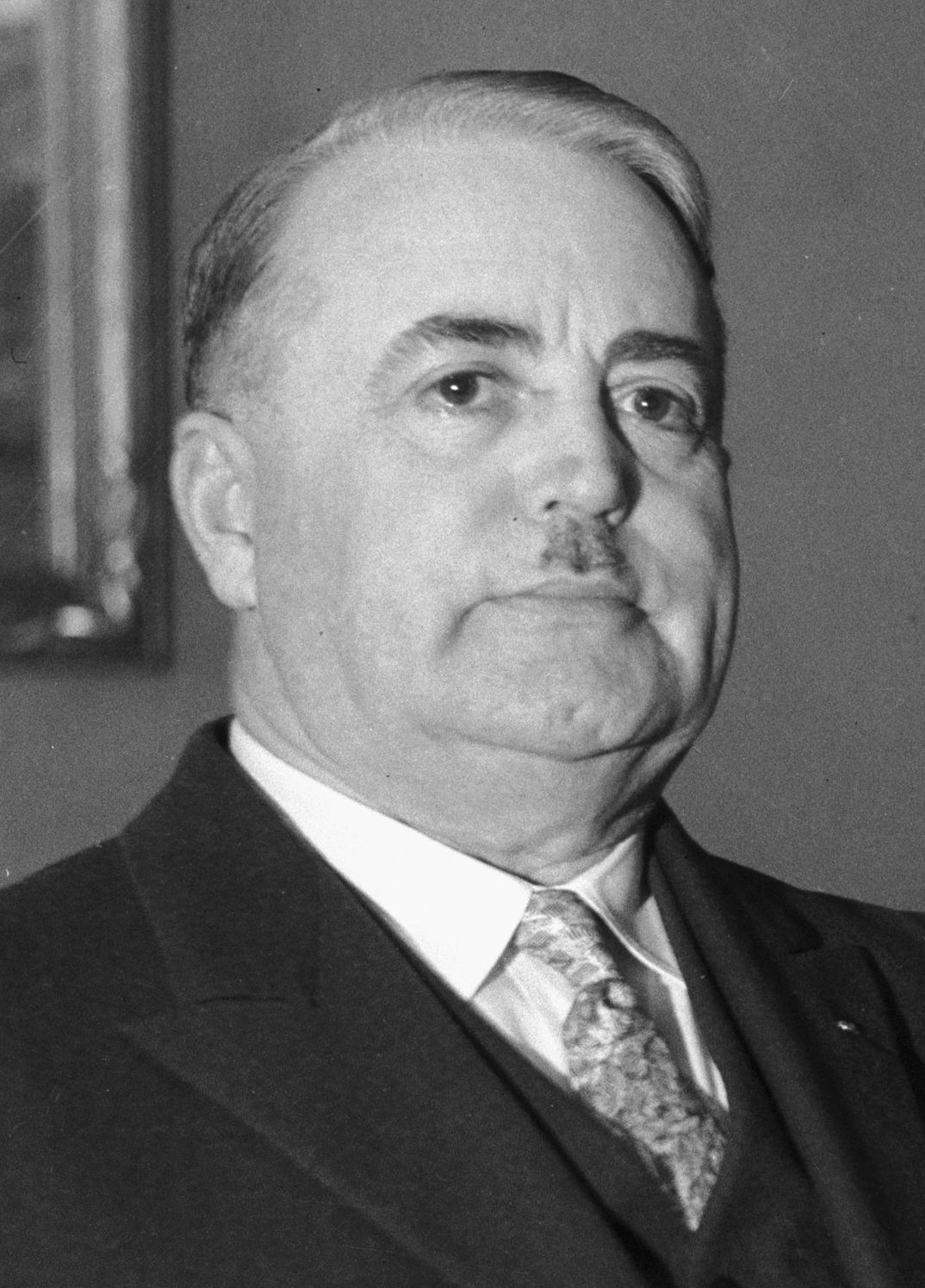

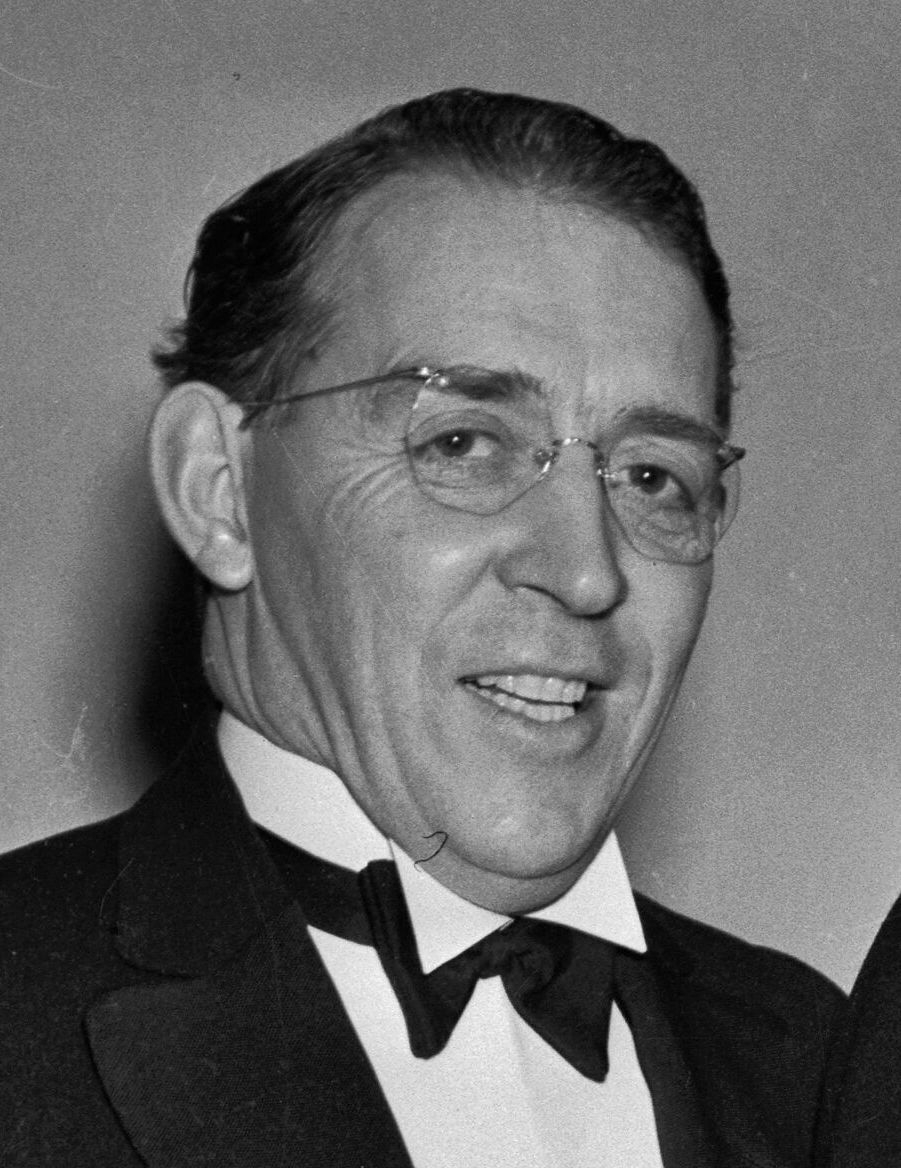

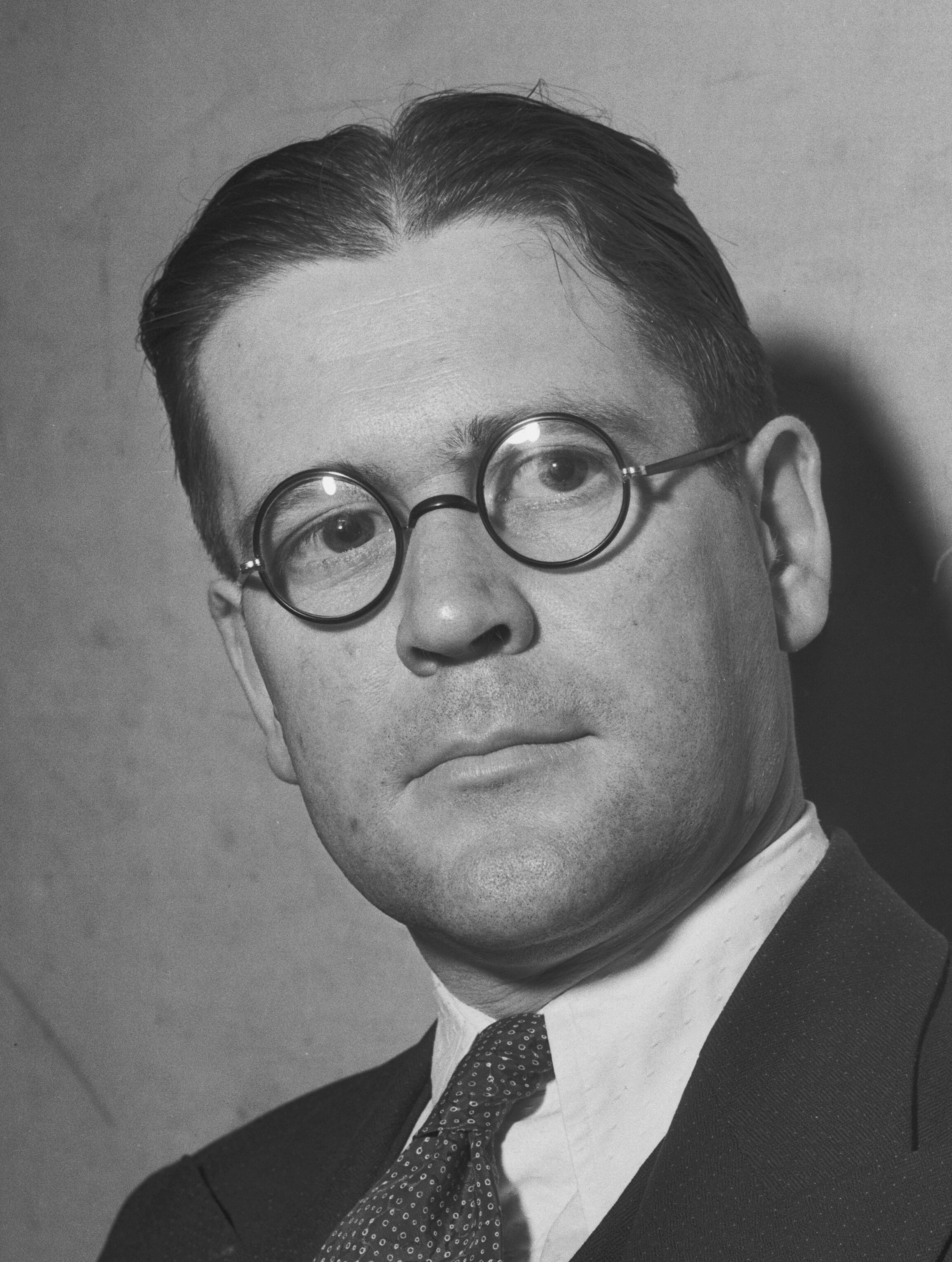

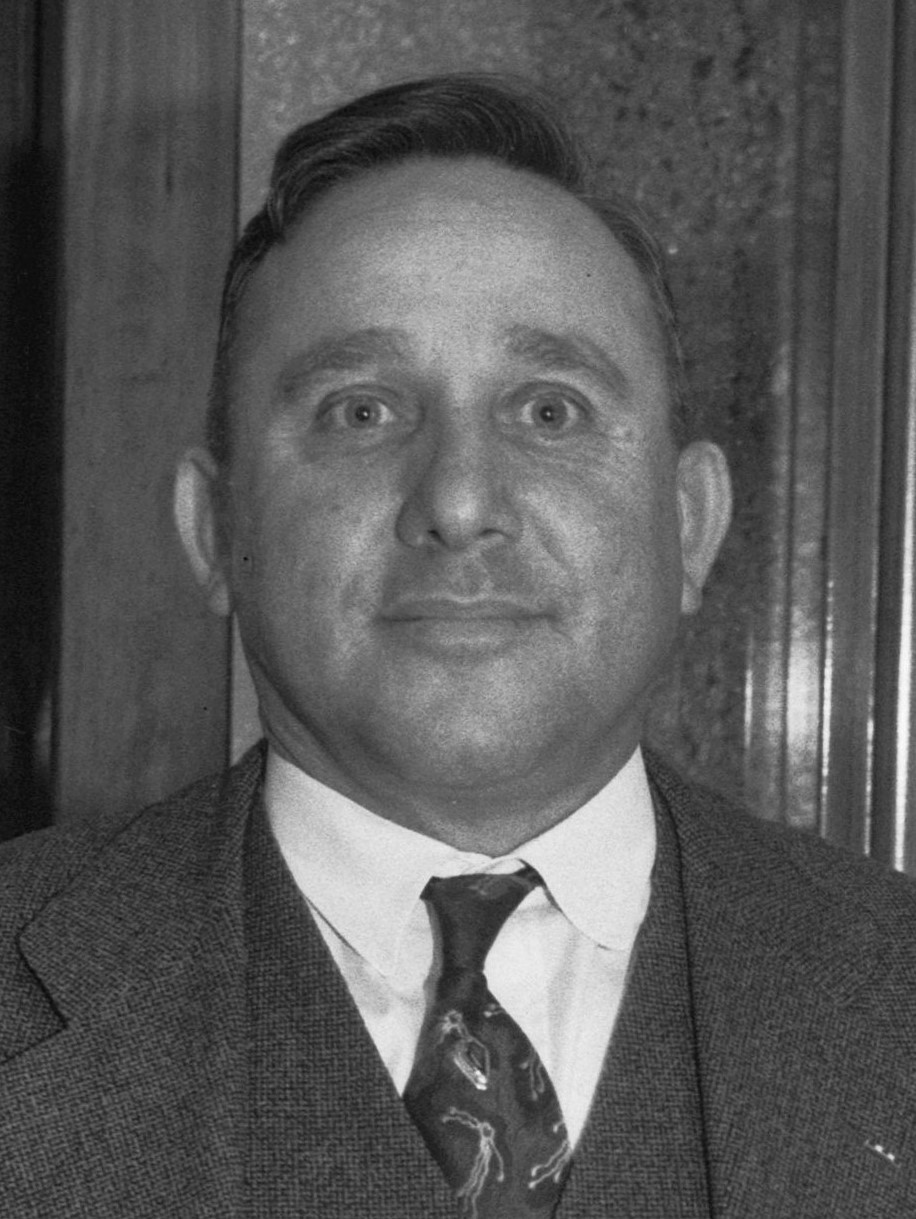
| Candidate | Frank L. Shaw | John Anson Ford |
| First round | 104,481; 42.57% | 77,703; 31.66% |
| Runoff | 171,415; 54.26% | 144,522; 45.74% |
| Candidate | Gordon L. McDonough | Carl B. Wirsching |
| First round | 40,526; 16.51% | 15,764; 6.42% |
| Runoff | Eliminated | Eliminated |
Mayor before election
Frank L. Shaw
Elected Mayor
Frank L. Shaw

The 1937 Los Angeles mayoral election took place on April 6, 1937, with a runoff election on May 4, 1937. Incumbent Frank L. Shaw was reelected over Supervisor John Anson Ford in the runoff election.

Municipal elections in California, including Mayor of Los Angeles, are officially nonpartisan; candidates' party affiliations do not appear on the ballot.

== Election ==
Shaw, who was elected in 1933, was seeking a second term for Mayor. He was challenged by Supervisors John Anson Ford and Gordon L. McDonough as well as President of the Board of Public Works Carl B. Wirsching, the son of Supervisor Robert E. Wirsching who was nominated to the post by Shaw. In the primary, Shaw and Ford advanced to the general election.

In the runoff, Shaw defeated Ford, with Ford conceding defeat and thanking his supporters the day after the election.

== Results ==
=== Primary election ===
Los Angeles mayoral primary election, April 6, 1937
| Candidate | Votes | % |
|---|---|---|
| Frank L. Shaw (incumbent) | 104,481 | 42.57 |
| John Anson Ford | 77,703 | 31.66 |
| Gordon L. McDonough | 40,526 | 16.51 |
| Carl B. Wirsching | 15,764 | 6.42 |
| Andrae B. Nordskog | 4,833 | 1.97 |
| Frank C. Shoemaker | 2,142 | 0.87 |
| Total votes | 245,449 | 100.00 |

=== General election ===
Los Angeles mayoral general election, May 4, 1937
| Candidate | Votes | % |
|---|---|---|
| Frank L. Shaw (incumbent) | 171,415 | 54.26 |
| John Anson Ford | 144,522 | 45.74 |
| Total votes | 315,937 | 100.00 |
