= Frederick J. Whiffen =

American politician

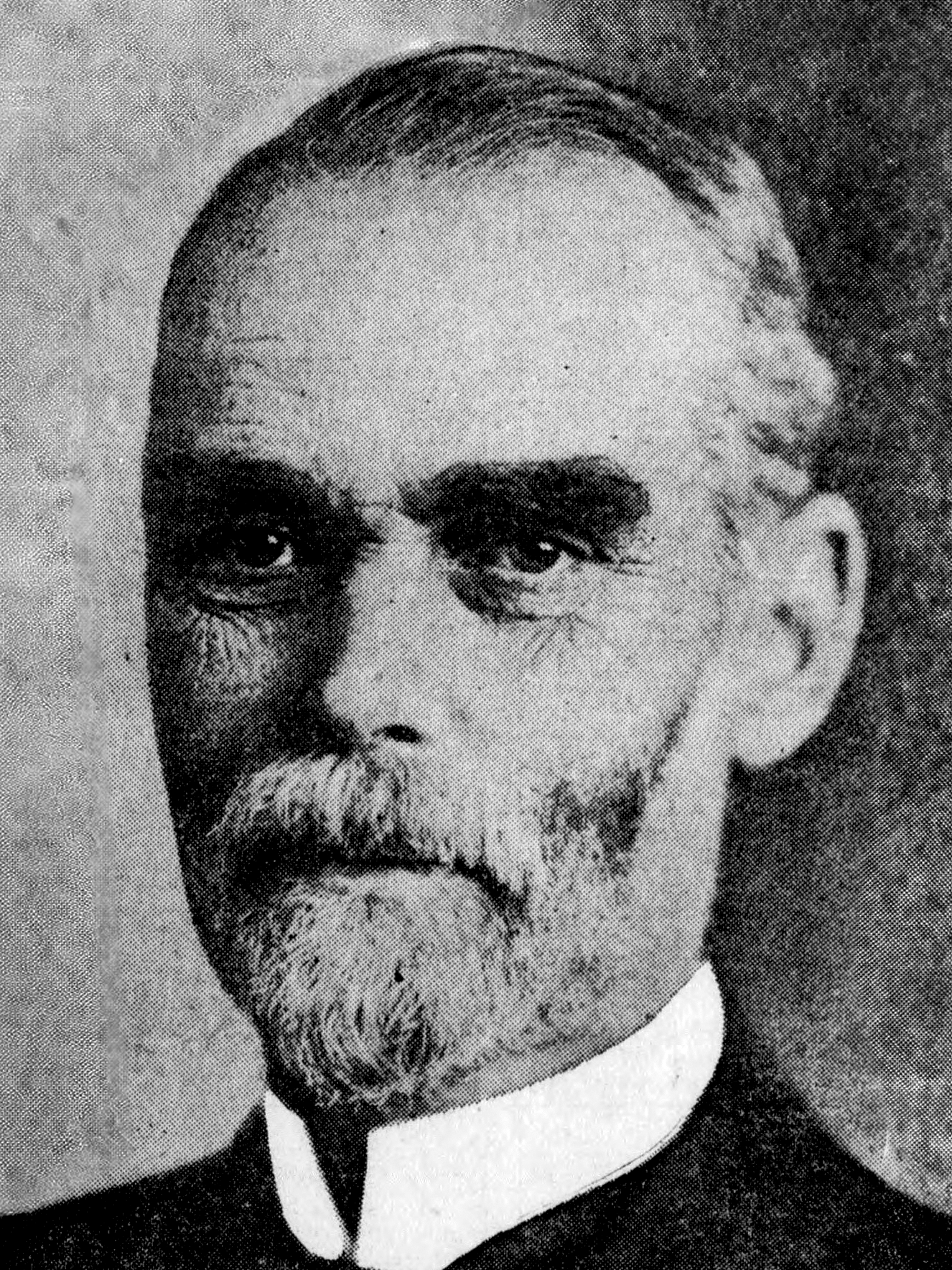
- Whiffen in 1915

President of the Los Angeles City Council
- In office July 7, 1913 – June 30, 1915
- Preceded by: George Williams
- Succeeded by: Martin F. Betkouski

Member of the Los Angeles City Council for the at-large district
- In office June 30, 1910 – June 30, 1915
- Preceded by: John D. Works
- Succeeded by: Fred C. Wheeler

Personal details
- Born: January 18, 1848 Sheboygan Falls, Wisconsin
- Died: December 1, 1929 (aged 81) San Pedro, Los Angeles
- Party: Republican
- Other political affiliations: Good Government; Municipal Conference
- Spouse: Adah Maria Hobart (m. 1871; died 1910)
- Children: 4
- Education: Bryant and Chase Business College

Frederick James Whiffen (January 18, 1848 – December 1, 1929) was an American politician who served in the Los Angeles City Council from 1910 until 1913, serving as President of the Los Angeles City Council from 1913 to 1915. He pursued a career in retail before moving into business ventures in cattle and iron manufacturing. He later shifted his focus to real estate, relocating to Los Angeles in 1892. Whiffen was elected to the City Council as part of the Good Government organization and played a key role in local politics, including a mayoral run in 1915 election.

== Early life and career ==
Whiffen was born on January 18, 1848, in Sheboygan Falls, Wisconsin to William Whiffen and Mary Ann Hitchcock. He received his education at a district school and attended Bryant and Chase Business College in Chicago, Illinois. He began his career as a clerk in a retail dry goods store before partnering with M. A. Calkins in 1873 to form the firm Whiffen & Calkins. The business grew significantly, and in 1887, Whiffen sold his interest in the company. He then invested in a herd of range cattle in Wyoming and an iron manufacturing business in Rockford, Illinois. By 1890, he had sold these investments and shifted his focus to real estate. In 1892, Whiffen moved to Los Angeles, California.

== Los Angeles City Council ==
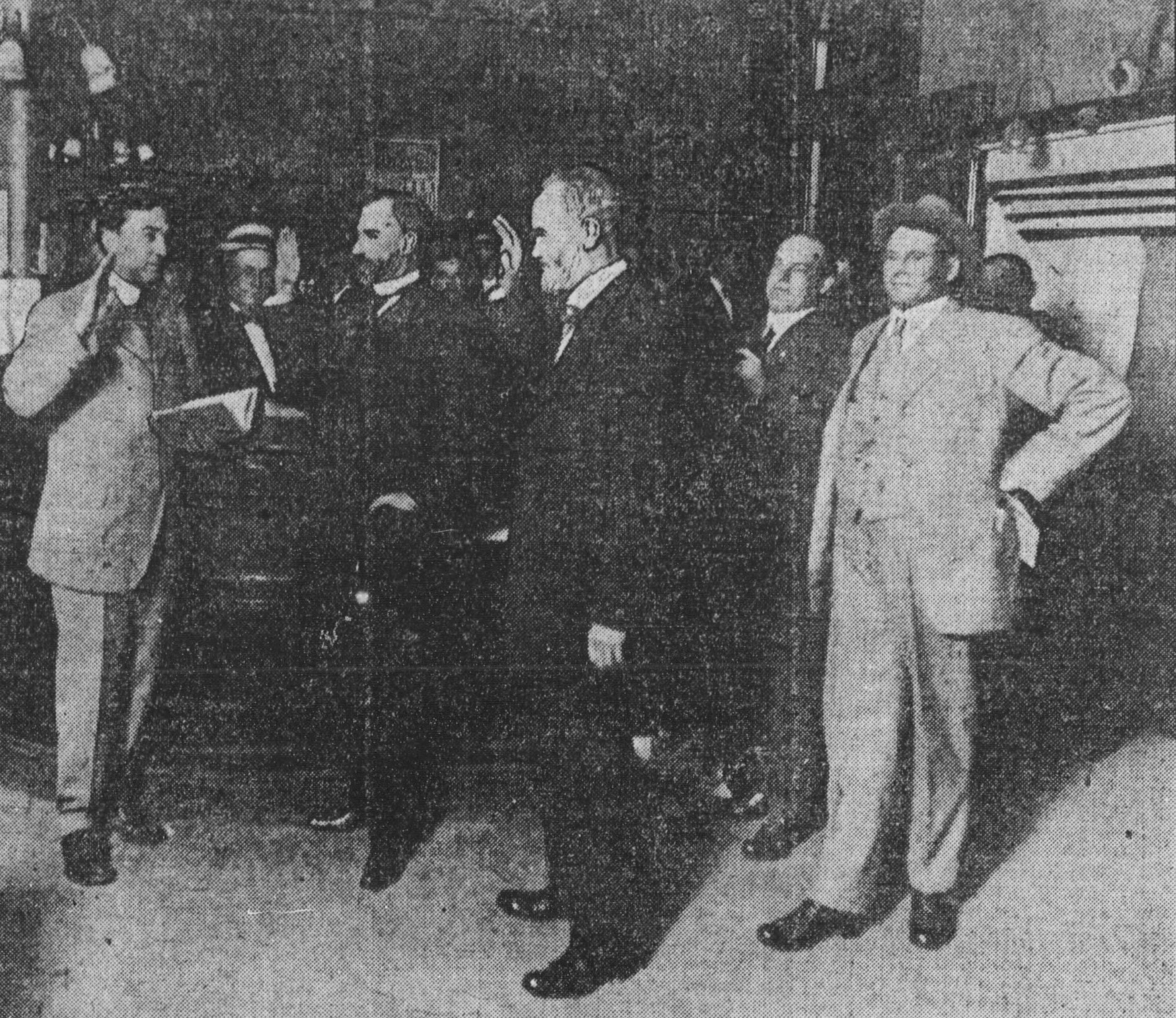
Whiffen and Stewart take the oath of office in 1910.

On March 22, 1910, two members of the Los Angeles City Council, John D. Works and Richmond Plant, resigned. Works left to pursue a seat in the U.S. Senate, while Plant resigned amid an investigation. Following their resignations, the City Council called for an election to fill the vacant seats. On April 17, 1910, Whiffen announced his candidacy for the Good Government nomination and was subsequently nominated along with George H. Stewart.

In the primary election, Whiffen placed fourth, behind Bernard Healy, Stewart, and Arthur D. Houghton. In the general election, he and Stewart won the election, gaining the two seats for the Good Government organization. He stated that he had "no interest, directly or indirectly, with any corporation" and vowed to represent the people faithfully.

In 1911, Whiffen ran for re-election on the general ticket for the Good Government organization. In the general election, Whiffen placed eighth and was re-elected to the city council. On July 1, 1913, Whiffen was elected as the President of the Los Angeles City Council. He officially took office on July 7, succeeding George Williams.

== Mayoral campaign ==
In 1915, Whiffen announced his candidacy for the mayoral election. His platform included promoting the consolidation of the city and county, developing the Harbor area, and keeping the city free from corruption. When the filing petitions for the mayoral race expired, Whiffen was up against five other candidates. Among them were Chief of Police Charles E. Sebastian and future councilmembers Robert M. Allan and Ralph Luther Criswell. He and Sebastian advanced in the primary, and in the runoff election on June 2, Sebastian defeated Whiffen by a majority of 4,509 votes. In September 1916, Whiffen alleged that he had been offered the position of mayor for $2,500 to succeed Sebastian, who had resigned amid scandal. This accusation prompted an investigation by District Attorney Thomas L. Woolwine to look into the charges.

== Personal life ==
Whiffen married Adah Maria Hobart on December 27, 1871, in Winnebago, Illinois. The couple had four children together before her death on January 7, 1910. During his tenure as a councilmember, he lived in the neighborhood San Pedro. Whiffen died at his home on December 1, 1929.

== Electoral history ==
Electoral history of Thomas F. Cooke
Year	Office	Party	Primary			General			Result	Swing	Ref.
Year	Office	Party	Total	%	P.	Total	%	P.	Result	Swing	Ref.
1910	Los Angeles City Council	Nonpartisan	4,679	17.96%	4th	16,834	29.26%	2nd	Won	N/A	
1911	Los Angeles City Council	Nonpartisan	Results unknown			78,383	6.76%	8th	Won	N/A	
1915	Mayor of Los Angeles	Nonpartisan	14,591	20.25%	2nd	41,989	47.45%	2nd	Lost	N/A	
