= G. Delbert Morris =

American politician (1909–1987)

Member of the California State Assembly from the 63rd district
- In office November 25, 1947 – February 29, 1956
- Preceded by: Don A. Allen
- Succeeded by: Don A. Allen

Personal details
- Born: June 23, 1909 Nogales, Arizona, US
- Died: November 4, 1987 (aged 78) Redondo Beach, California, US
- Party: Republican
- Spouse: Mary Jean Weltner (m. 1948, d. 1953)
- Children: 2

Military service
- Branch/service: United States Navy
- Battles/wars: World War II

G. Delbert Morris (June 23, 1909 – November 4, 1987) was a United States Republican politician who served in the California State Assembly for the 63rd district from 1947 to 1956.

Morris was born in Nogales, Arizona. During World War II he served in the United States Navy. He was elected to the California State Assembly in 1948, and remained a member until his resignation in 1956, after having been found guilty of perjury concerning the sale of state liquor licenses. He was sentenced to two years in prison. In December 1961, Governor Edmund G. "Pat" Brown pardoned Morris.

He was survived by two daughters and his wife. He also served in the US Navy during World War II. He was aboard the USS Lexington in WWII when it sank, but survived.
