= James C. Corman =

American politician (1920–2000)

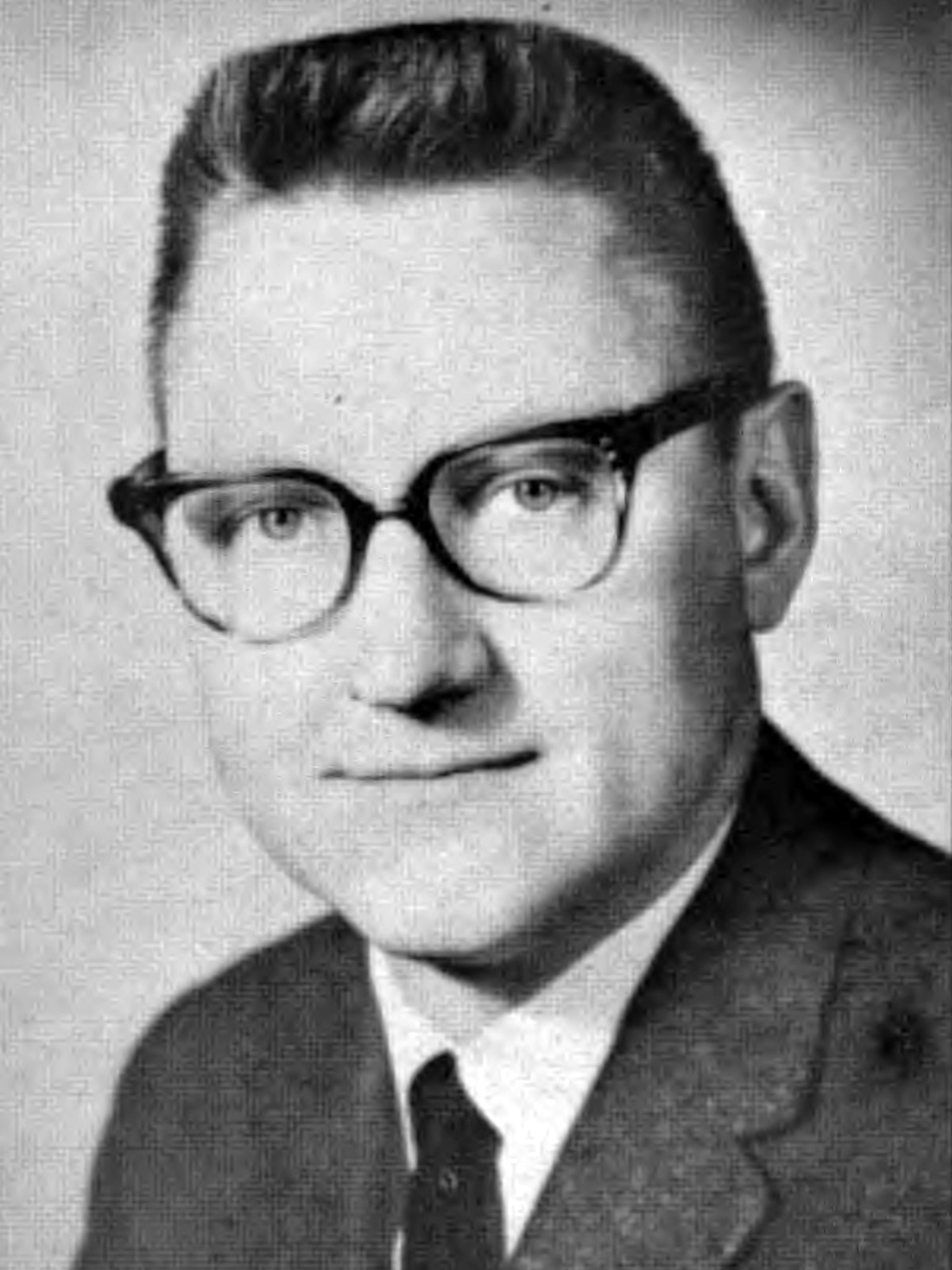
- Official portrait, 1963

Member of the U.S. House of Representatives from California
- In office January 3, 1961 – January 3, 1981
- Preceded by: Joseph F. Holt
- Succeeded by: Bobbi Fiedler
- Constituency: 22nd district (1961–1975); 21st district (1975–1981)

Member of the Los Angeles City Council from the 7th district
- In office July 1, 1957 – January 3, 1961
- Preceded by: Don A. Allen
- Succeeded by: Ernani Bernardi

Personal details
- Born: James Charles Corman; October 20, 1920 Galena, Kansas, U.S.
- Died: December 30, 2000 (aged 80) Arlington, Virginia, U.S.
- Resting place: Arlington National Cemetery
- Party: Democratic
- Spouse(s): Virginia Little (died 1966); Carole Franda (div.); Patti Lear (div.); Nancy Breetwor-Malone (m. 1978)
- Children: 4
- Education: University of California, Los Angeles (BA); University of Southern California (JD)

Military service
- Allegiance: United States
- Branch/service: United States Marine Corps
- Rank: Second lieutenant
- Battles/wars: World War II

James Charles Corman (October 20, 1920 – December 30, 2000) was an American politician who served as a member of the Los Angeles City Council from 1957 to 1961 and as a member of the United States House of Representatives between 1961 and 1981.

== Early life and education ==
Corman was born on October 20, 1920, in Galena, Kansas, the son of Ransford D. Corman and Edna V. Corman, both of Kansas. His father was a silica miner who died of lung disease brought on by his work. Young James was brought to California by his mother in 1933; he attended Belmont High School in Los Angeles and earned a Bachelor of Arts degree from University of California, Los Angeles and a Juris Doctor degree from the USC Gould School of Law.

=== Military ===
Corman was a cadet officer at UCLA with the Reserve Officer Training Corps, and he was made a second lieutenant in the U.S. Marine Corps in June 1943.

In 1944, he told of the death of a Japanese soldier he witnessed in the Mariana Islands while his Marine unit was guarding a food supply. The Marines held their fire until the Japanese "began pawing over the [food] in the darkness, and then opened fire." One Japanese "fell wounded over a crate of salmon cans. His companions fled." Corman continued:

Suddenly we heard the tap of a grenade. We ducked into our foxholes just before the explosion and were unhurt. In the morning we found the Jap had decapitated himself. In his wallet was a magazine clipping of a picture of Japanese-American soldiers fighting with United States forces in Italy.

== Career ==
=== City Council ===
In 1957 Corman, supported by labor and Democratic votes, was elected to a four-year term represent Los Angeles City Council District 7, over Kay Bogendorfer, a Republican. In that year, this newly established San Fernando Valley district was bounded on the south by Riverside Drive on the east by Coldwater Canyon and Woodman avenues and on the west generally by Balboa Boulevard. It had been moved from Downtown Los Angeles after Councilman Don A. Allen was elected to the State Assembly. Corman did not finish his term, being elected to Congress in 1960.

=== Congress ===
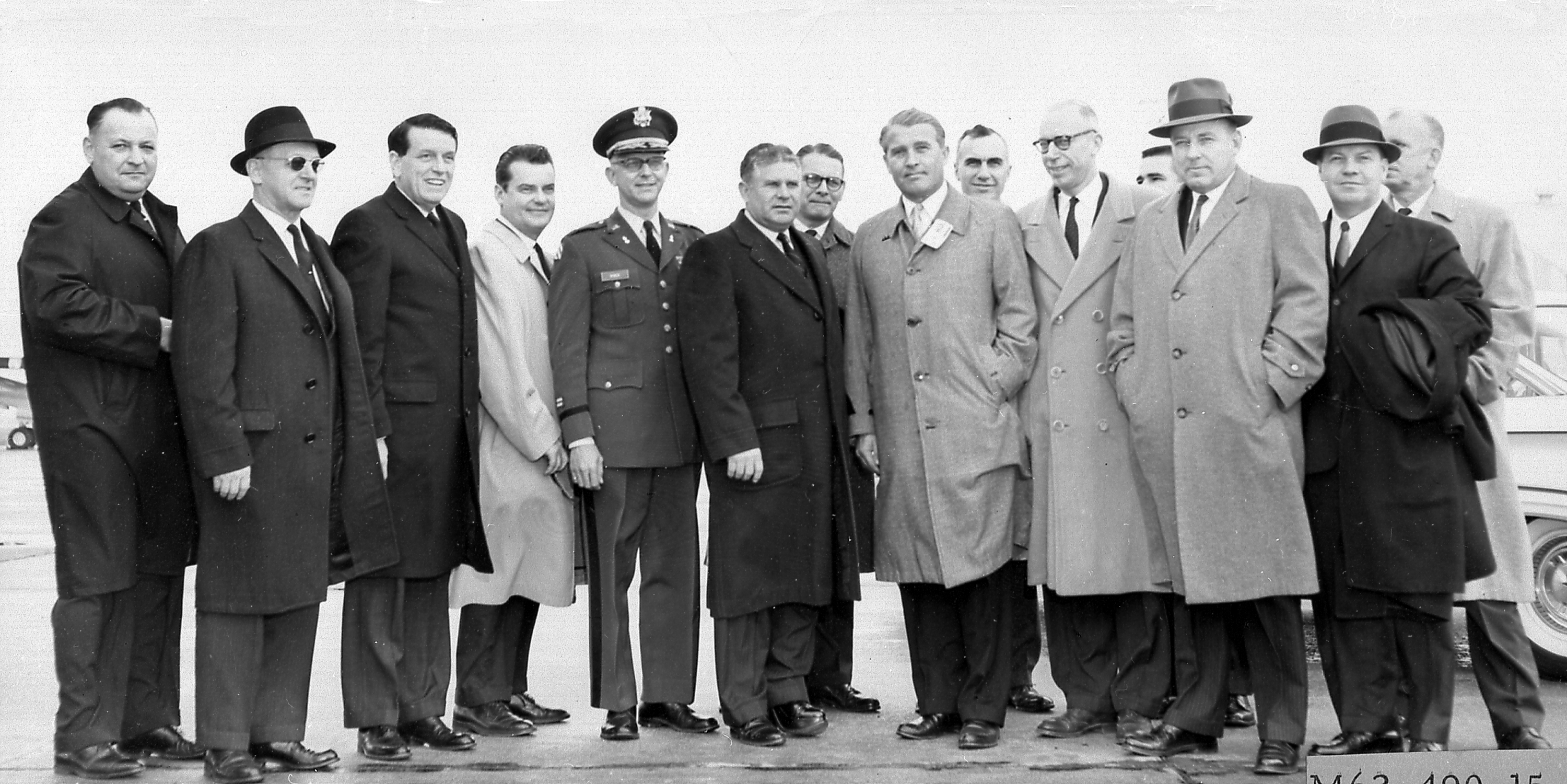
Representative Corman and other members of the House Committee on Science and Astronautics visit the Marshall Space Flight Center on March 9, 1962, to gather first-hand information of the nation's space exploration program.

"In with President Kennedy and out with President Carter," he would say after he left the United States Congress. He served in the House of Representatives from 1961 to 1981. Corman served as the chair of the Democratic Congressional Campaign Committee from 1976 to 1981. Until Sean Patrick Maloney’s defeat in 2022, Corman was the most recent chairman of the DCCC to lose re-election.

Corman voted in favor of the 24th Amendment to the U.S. Constitution, the Civil Rights Act of 1964, the Voting Rights Act of 1965, the Medicare program, the Civil Rights Act of 1968, and alongside fellow Democrat Martha Griffiths and Republicans Charles Adams Mosher and Ogden Reid, was one of the main co-sponsors of the House version of Ted Kennedy's Health Security Act universal healthcare bill in 1971.

In 1980, Corman was narrowly defeated for re-election by Los Angeles School Board member Bobbi Fiedler.

=== Later career ===
After his Congressional service, he opened a lobbying firm, Corman Law Offices, in Washington, D.C., with a partner, William Kirk. Their clients included MCA Inc., American Newspaper Publishers Association and National Structured Settlements Trade Association. The firm merged with Silverstein & Mullens in January 1990. Corman represented Texas Air Corporation president Frank Lorenzo in his contested takeover of Continental Airlines. He stopped representing the National Committee to Preserve Social Security and Medicare because of its "high-pressure fund-raising methods and alarmist pronouncements."

In 1985 he was elected president of Americans United for Separation of Church and State.

== Personal life ==
A Methodist, he was married on June 22, 1946, to Virginia Little of Atlanta, Georgia. They had two children, Mary Ann and James C. Jr.

Corman was said to be "extremely bright, intensely private and sometimes moody" as well as "a courtly man in a tumultuous time ... with old-fashioned graciousness." At age 68, he was described as a "dapper in monogrammed shirts, leather suspenders and wing-tipped shoes."

Corman died at age 80 on December 30, 2000, after suffering a stroke in a rehabilitation facility in Arlington, Virginia. He was survived by his fourth wife, Nancy Breetwor-Malone. They had two children, Adam and Brian. A funeral service was held in Arlington National Cemetery, and interment followed.

== Legacy ==
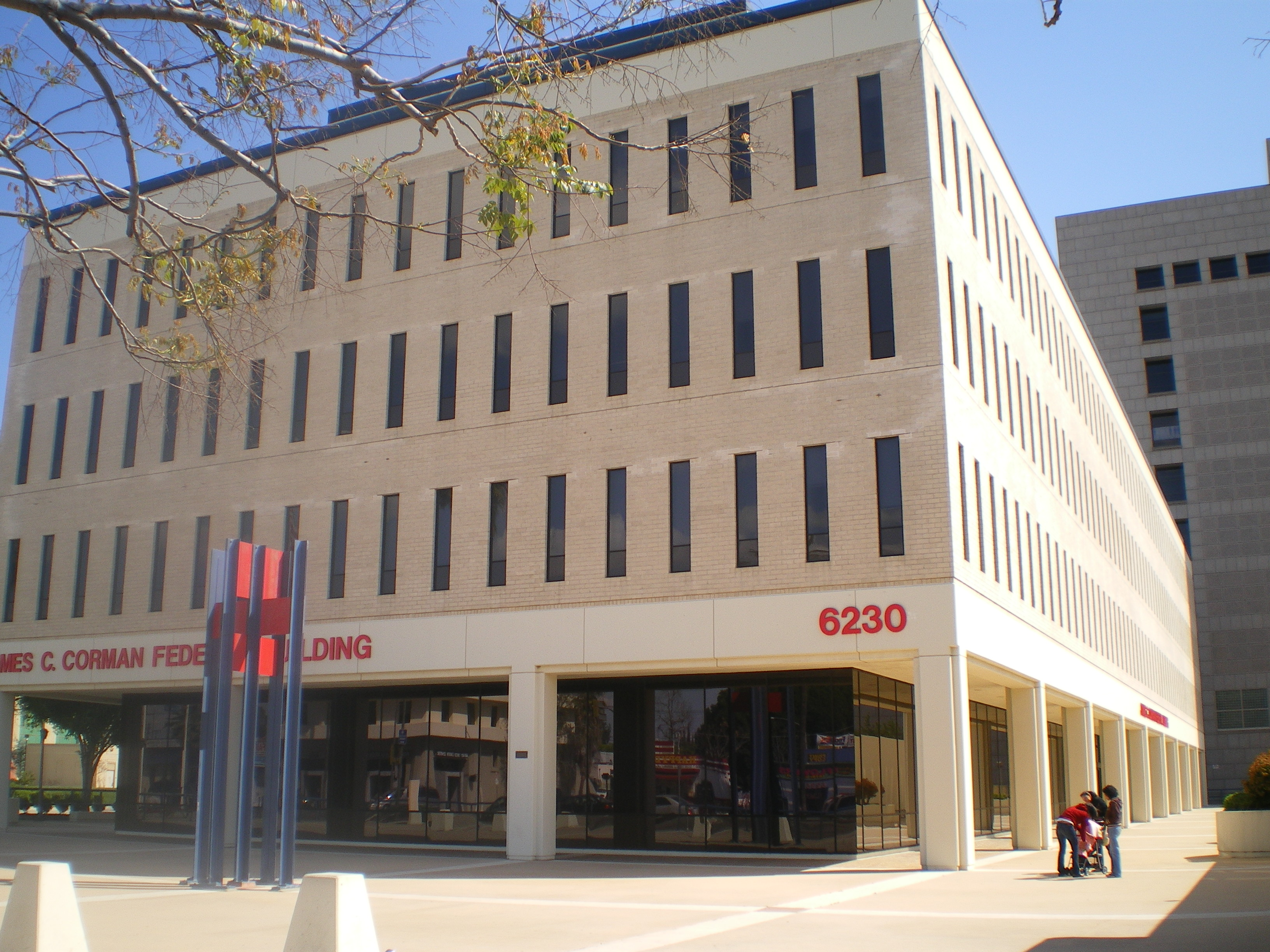
James C. Corman Federal Building in Van Nuys

In 2001, the Van Nuys Federal Building was named in his honor. He was portrayed by Stoney Westmoreland in the 2016 film All the Way. The James C. Corman papers are held in the University Library at California State University, Northridge.

== Electoral history ==
James Corman electoral history

1960 United States House of Representatives elections in California
Party	Candidate	Votes	%
Democratic	James C. Corman	104,919	51.1%
Republican	Lemoine Blanchard	100,321	48.9%
Total votes		205,240	100.0%
Turnout			
Democratic gain from Republican			

1962 United States House of Representatives elections in California
Party	Candidate	Votes	%
Democratic	James C. Corman (incumbent)	75,294	53.6%
Republican	Charles S. Foote	65,087	46.4%
Total votes		140,381	100.0%
Turnout			
Democratic hold			

1964 United States House of Representatives elections in California
Party	Candidate	Votes	%
Democratic	James C. Corman (incumbent)	94,141	50.5%
Republican	Robert C. Cline	92,133	49.5%
Total votes		186,274	100.0%
Turnout			
Democratic hold			

1966 United States House of Representatives elections in California
Party	Candidate	Votes	%
Democratic	James C. Corman (incumbent)	94,420	53.5%
Republican	Robert C. Cline	82,207	46.5%
Total votes		176,627	100.0%
Turnout			
Democratic hold			

1968 United States House of Representatives elections in California
Party	Candidate	Votes	%
Democratic	James C. Corman (incumbent)	102,332	56.9%
Republican	Joe Holt	74,433	41.4%
Peace and Freedom	Hugh Manes	3,024	1.7%
Total votes		179,789	100.0%
Turnout			
Democratic hold			

1970 United States House of Representatives elections in California
Party	Candidate	Votes	%
Democratic	James C. Corman (incumbent)	95,256	59.4%
Republican	Tom Hayden	63,297	39.5%
American Independent	Callis R. Johnson	1,880	1.1%
Total votes		160,433	100.0%
Turnout			
Democratic hold			

1972 United States House of Representatives elections in California
Party	Candidate	Votes	%
Democratic	James C. Corman (incumbent)	121,352	67.6%
Republican	Bruce P. Wolfe	52,664	29.3%
Peace and Freedom	Ralph L. Shroyer	5,583	3.1%
Total votes		179,599	100.0%
Turnout			
Democratic hold			

1974 United States House of Representatives elections in California, 21st district
Party	Candidate	Votes	%
Democratic	James C. Corman (Incumbent)	86,778	73.5
Republican	Mel Nadell	31,365	26.5
Total votes		118,143	100.0
Turnout			
Democratic hold			

1976 United States House of Representatives elections in California, 21st district
Party	Candidate	Votes	%
Democratic	James C. Corman (Incumbent)	101,837	66.5
Republican	Erwin Ed Hogan	44,094	28.8
Peace and Freedom	Bill Hill	7,178	4.7
Total votes		153,109	100.0
Turnout			
Democratic hold			

1978 United States House of Representatives elections in California, 21st district
Party	Candidate	Votes	%
Democratic	James C. Corman (Incumbent)	73,869	59.5
Republican	Rod Walsh	44,519	35.9
Peace and Freedom	Bill Hill	5,750	4.6
Total votes		124,138	100.0
Turnout			
Democratic hold			

Political offices
Preceded by Don A. Allen	Los Angeles City Council; 7th District; 1957–61	Succeeded by Ernani Bernardi
U.S. House of Representatives
Preceded by Joseph F. Holt	Member of the U.S. House of Representatives from California's 22nd congressional district 1961–1975	Succeeded by Carlos J. Moorhead
Preceded by Augustus Hawkins	Member of the U.S. House of Representatives from California's 21st congressional district 1975–1981	Succeeded by Bobbi Fiedler
