= Ralph Luther Criswell =

American politician

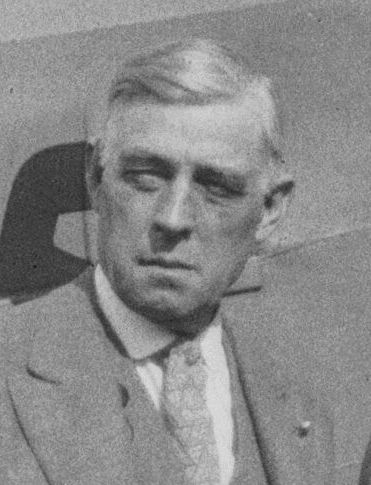
- Chriswell in 1927

Member of the Los Angeles City Council for the 7th district
- In office July 1, 1925 – June 30, 1927
- Preceded by: Constituency established
- Succeeded by: Howard W. Davis

President of the Los Angeles City Council
- In office July 5, 1921 – July 1, 1923
- Preceded by: Boyle Workman
- Succeeded by: Boyle Workman

Member of the Los Angeles City Council for the at-large district
- In office July 1, 1917 – June 30, 1925

Personal details
- Born: October 12, 1861 Rushville, Illinois, U.S.
- Died: November 17, 1947 (aged 86) Los Angeles, California, U.S.
- Party: Socialist (until 1917); Republican (from 1917)

Ralph Luther Criswell (October 12, 1861 – November 17, 1947) was a member of the Los Angeles City Council for ten years in the early 20th century. He then became a special agent, or lobbyist, for the Colorado River Project that brought water to Southern California.

== Biography ==
Criswell was born on October 12, 1861, in Rushville, Illinois, to Edmund L. Criswell and the former Susan Catherine Wright. When he was fourteen, he worked in a print shop and became a Linotype machine operator. He joined the International Typographical Union in 1895 and managed the Johnstown News in Johnstown, Nebraska, and founded the Northwestern County Gazette in 1886 in Kansas.

Criswell was married in December 1885 in Tecumseh, Nebraska, to May Greene of Petersburg, Illinois, and after they moved to California in 1897 they lived in Santa Paula for a year, then settled at 529 West 41st Place, Los Angeles. He was employed by the Los Angeles Herald and then the Los Angeles Examiner in 1903, when it was founded. He was a City Council member from 1917 to 1927 and then was hired by the Water and Power commissioners as a "special Colorado River agent." He was a Methodist. Criswell died in his home at 4728 Whitewood Avenue, Lakewood Village, Long Beach on November 17, 1947, and was buried in Inglewood Park Cemetery. He was survived by a son, Ralph Greene Criswell.

== Public life ==
=== Elections ===
1912–14 Criswell was the Socialist Party candidate for Congress in the 9th district in 1912, coming in third place with 18.2% of the vote. He ran again in the 10th district in 1914, polling 13% of the vote.

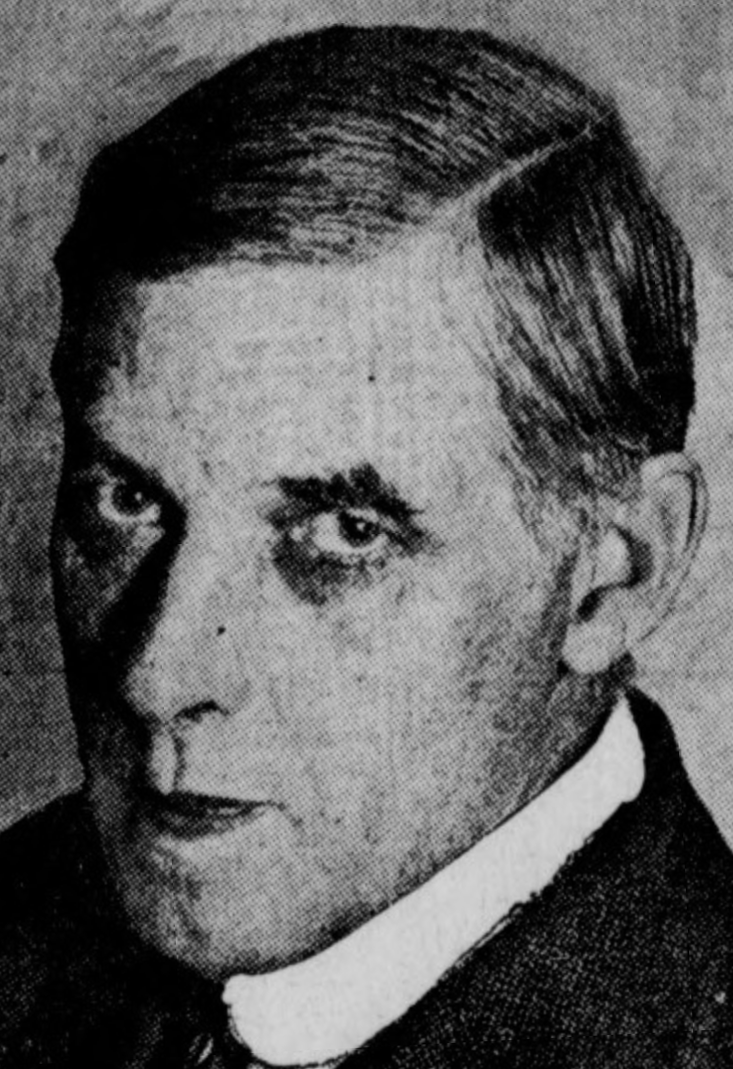
Criswell in 1915 while campaigning for mayor.

1915–17 Criswell was the Socialist Party candidate for mayor in 1915 and came in fourth among six candidates in the primary election and so did not advance to the final. He ran for Congress once more in the 9th district in 1916, polling 9.5% of the vote. The next year, in advance of a new campaign for City Council, he resigned from what was called the "red card" wing of the Socialist Party, writing in a letter to E.L. Osgood, chapter secretary:

The Socialist movement has far outgrown the present party machinery, and I have decided to cast my lot with that large and constantly growing body of Socialists who believes that the red card organization has outlived its usefulness and that Socialism can no be better advanced through an organization formed as an ordinary political party . . . .

1917–23 At that time he was a member of the city's Civil Service Board, from which he resigned when he was elected councilman in 1917. In the May primary that year, he came in 10th, and in the June general election he placed eighth and was elected. He was re-elected in June 1919. In 1921 he was opposed by the Los Angeles Examiner but editorially endorsed by the Times, and he thereupon placed second in the general election, after Robert Stewart Sparks. In his 1923 campaign, Criswell was fourth among the nine successful candidates.

1924, 1926 In both 1924 and 1926 Criswell was a candidate for the Republican nomination for U.S. Congress on a platform heavily directed toward completion of a dam in Boulder Canyon, Arizona, to bring water to Southern California. Criswell was criticized in 1924 for using a city automobile — a Peerless — with a city driver, while campaigning. He was beaten in 1924 by incumbent John D. Fredericks and in 1926 by Joe Crail, 68,513 votes to 27,040.

1925 A new city charter effective in 1925 changed the method of election, and Criswell campaigned for the first seat in the new 7th District. The district was bounded on the north by Jefferson Boulevard, on the south by Slauson Boulevard, on the west by Vermont Avenue and on the east by South Park Avenue. He beat Howard W. Davis in the final election by a vote of 3,477 to 2,768.

1927 The Boulder Dam project was brought up once again when Criswell ran for City Council re-election in 1927, the Times claiming that "Criswell has lost ground . . . and was absent in Washington for several months lobbying for the Power Bureau." Criswell lost in the May primary, 2,468 votes to Howard W. Davis's 3,305.

== City Council ==
=== City Working Conditions ===
Criswell was "credited with the successful passage of the ordinance whereby the unimportant city employee share equally with the 'white collar job holder in holidays and vacation privileges." In July 1917 he introduced a proposal to pay union scale to city-employed "mechanics and laborers," but the plan was not adopted.

=== Racial equality ===
At Criswell's urging and with his vigorous support, the City Council unanimously adopted a resolution in April 1919 opposing what it said would be a "covenant for 'racial equality' that it had been "credibly informed" would be considered by the World War I peace conference then meeting in Paris. The Criswell resolution claimed that the covenant would "grant oriental countries free immigration, naturalization, the elective franchise, the privilege to own agricultural and other lands and the right of intermarriage. . . . these privileges cannot be granted without imperiling the welfare of the white population and ultimately of American civilization."

=== Ku Klux Klan ===
The Times broke a major story on June 6, 1922, with a photograph of an application for membership in the Ku Klux Klan, bearing Criswell's signature, stating that:

I, the undersigned, a native born true and loyal citizen of the United States of America, being a white male Gentile person of temperate habits, sound in mind, and a believer in the tenets of the Christian religion, the maintenance of White Supremacy, the practice of an honorable clannishness and the principles of "pure Americanism," do voluntarily most respectfully, seriously and unselfishly petition you for citizenship in the Invisible Empire, Knights of the Ku Klux Klan . . .

Away in Washington, D.C., since May 30, Criswell at first said he did not know anything about it, but when he returned to Los Angeles he affirmed that he had signed the application, in blank, but that he had "no knowledge of the workings of the Klan." He made no reference to a second handwritten document bearing his signature in which he answered "Yes" to the question, "Do you believe in white supremacy?"

=== Opposed by Mayor ===
Criswell drew opposition from Mayor Frederic T. Woodman in 1922 when the councilman persuaded the council to ask Woodman for details of a "secret service fund" that Woodman controlled for the purpose of investigating cafés where police officers could not enter and procure evidence. Woodman wrote: "Mr. Criswell, I know, opposed secret service funds, has opposed police activity, voted against a red flag ordinance [forbidding the display of socialist banners]. . . and apparently believes that the authorities . . . should not direct their attention toward the suppression of vice and disorder."

=== Police Department ===
Criswell locked horns with Police Chief Louis D. Oaks on several occasions, at one point in 1922 making "startling charges" that "members of the police department have been levying thousands of dollars in protection money" and at another blocking for several weeks a request by the chief for 1,500 badges for his officers and 50 Dodge automobiles for his department.

=== Council presidency ===
He was elected council president by his colleagues in 1921–23.

Preceded by Constituency established	Los Angeles City Council; 7th District; 1925–1927	Succeeded by Howard W. Davis
Preceded by Boyle Workman	President of the Los Angeles City Council; 1921–1923	Succeeded by Boyle Workman
