= Minneapolis Business College =

- Motto: "Finish First"
- Type: For-profit college
- Active: 1874–2019
- President: David Whitman
- Location: Roseville, Minnesota, United States; 45°0′25″N 93°10′23″W
- Website: www.minneapolisbusinesscollege.edu

Minneapolis Business College (MBC) was a for-profit college in Roseville, Minnesota, United States. It was founded in 1874 and moved to its current suburban location in 1983. It closed in December 2019.

== Accreditation ==
Minneapolis Business College was accredited by the Accrediting Council for Independent Colleges and Schools to award diplomas and associate degrees. The Medical Assisting Program was accredited by the Commission on Accreditation of Allied Health Education Programs.

== Closure ==
On June 26, 2019, Bradford Schools, the parent company of Minneapolis Business College, announced that they would be closing the school in December of the same year. The 90 current students were allowed to complete their programs and limited staff stayed on through June 2020 to assist graduates with job placement.
