= Don A. Allen =

American politician (1907–1983)

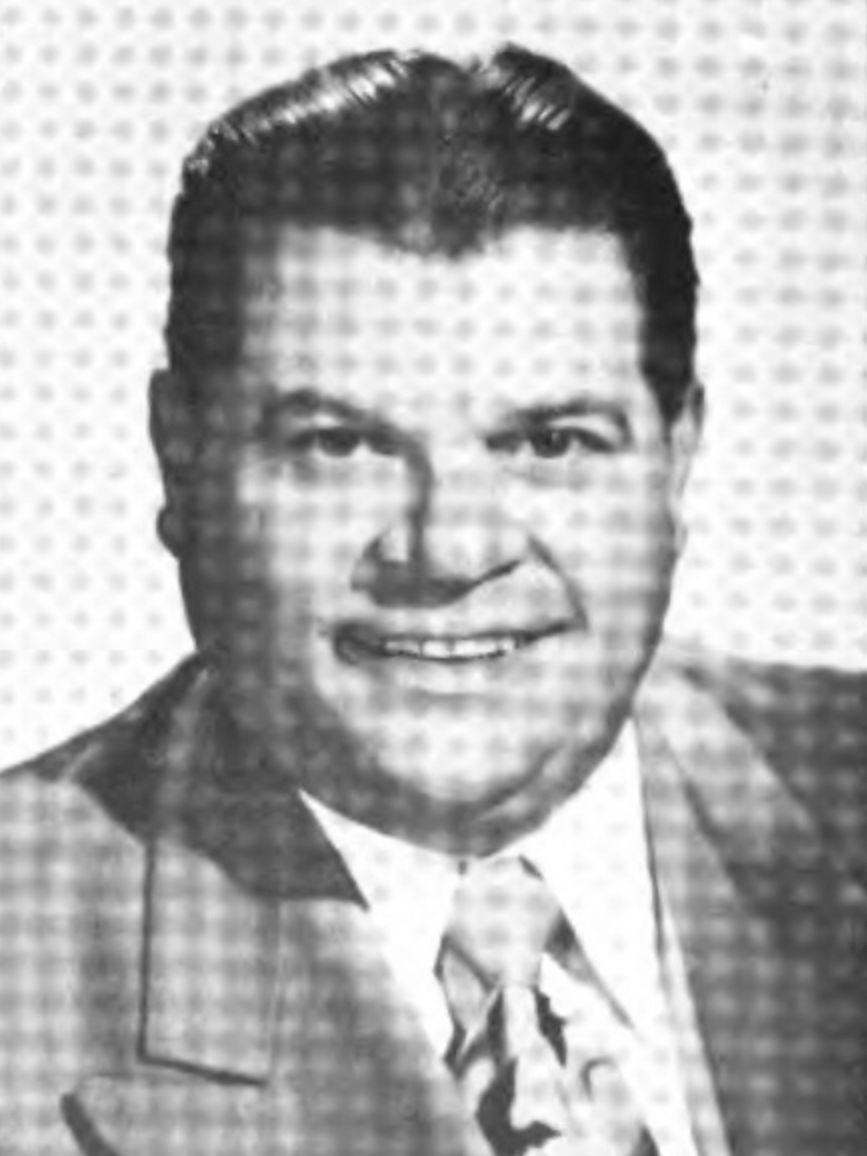
- Official portrait, 1958

Member of the California State Assembly from the 63rd district
- In office September 13, 1956 – January 2, 1967
- Preceded by: G. Delbert Morris
- Succeeded by: Yvonne Brathwaite Burke
- In office January 2, 1939 – June 20, 1947
- Preceded by: Ralph Lewis Welsh
- Succeeded by: G. Delbert Morris

Member of the Los Angeles City Council from the 7th district
- In office July 1, 1947 – September 13, 1956
- Preceded by: Carl C. Rasmussen
- Succeeded by: James C. Corman

Personal details
- Born: May 13, 1907 Atlantic, Iowa, US
- Died: August 1, 1983 (aged 83) Sacramento, California, US
- Party: Democratic
- Spouse: Margaret Sachs
- Children: Don A. Jr.
- Education: University of Southern California; Caltech

Military service
- Branch/service: United States Marine Corps

Don A. Allen Sr. (May 13, 1907 – August 1, 1983) was a member of the California State Assembly in the 1940s and 1950s and of the Los Angeles City Council between 1947 and 1956.

== Biography ==
Allen was born on May 13, 1907, in Atlantic, Iowa, the son of Thomas Allen of Missouri and Lillian M. Allen of Potosi, Wisconsin. He attended public schools in Iowa and Nebraska, where he studied civil engineering, and completed courses in engineering science and war training at the University of Southern California and Caltech. He was married to Margaret Sachs or Margaret H. Rogers of Detmold, Germany; they had a son, Don A. Allen Jr. Both Allens were in the U.S. Marines, the elder serving in the Haitian campaign of 1927 against the Sandino Rebellion.

Allen was a member of the Veterans of Foreign Wars, the Elks Lodge, Rotary and the United Commercial Travelers. He attended McCarty Memorial Christian Church.

He died in August 1983 in Oceanside, California.

== Public service ==
In the 1920s he was an investigator for Los Angeles County District Attorney Thomas Woolwine.

=== State Assembly ===
Allen was elected to the State Assembly in 1938 and was reelected in 1940, 1942 and 1944. He was a member of the State Council of Defense and the State War Council. He resigned on June 20, 1947, to assume the duties of a Los Angeles City Council member. In June 1956 he was reelected to the Assembly in a special election but instead remained on the council and declined to serve in the Assembly until after the regular election in November 1958. The Legislature did not meet until 1959, when he took his seat. Allen was the author of The Source Book on the California Legislature, published in 1965, and as a result the entire Legislature named him "California Legislative Historian for Life."

=== City Council ===
==== Elections ====
Allen was elected to represent Los Angeles City Council District 7 in 1947, defeating the incumbent, Carl C. Rasmussen. He was reelected in 1949, 1951, 1953 and 1955. Between 1937 and 1956 the district was bounded on the west by Crenshaw Boulevard, on the north by Exposition Boulevard, on the east by the city boundary with Vernon and on the south by Vernon Avenue. In 1947 it was noted that the district's population was "nearly 50 per cent Negro." In 1957, after Allen's resignation, the district was moved bodily to the San Fernando Valley.

==== Positions ====
Voting machines, 1948. Allen introduced a resolution that voting machines be installed "as a substitute for election boards" because "they would "eliminate the human error potential in tabulating returns."

Juveniles, 1950. The council adopted his motion asking the Police Department what was being done to enforce curfew laws. He said it was his opinion that if policemen were "equipped with a good old-fashioned hair brush, which could be applied to some of these kids," there might be a lessening of juvenile crime. But Councilman Edward R. Roybal disagreed, noting that most of the "hoodlums" were over 21 and recommending closer cooperation by the police with agencies "dealing with youth problems."

Rent decontrol, 1950–51. Allen and Councilman Ed J. Davenport were leaders of a drive asking the federal government to lift wartime rent controls on rentals in the city, and when the City Council voted in favor, petitions were circulated to recall the two men. When the federal government declined to lift the controls, an "explosive situation" of "near-riot proportions" broke out in the City Council chamber, with Allen threatening to "break every bone" in the head of the chairman of a Tenants Council. The next year, though, after the controls had been lifted, he called for imposition of new limits unless "rent gougers" ceased imposing increases of 50% to 100%.

Small business, 1951. He blasted the federal government price regulations because:

In my district (south central section of the city) scores of small businesses are folding up. They can't take it any longer. They are being regulated to death; they're quitting and getting a job in defense industry rather than face the maze of directives that they can't understand and that local Federal offices can't seem to interpret.

Chavez Ravine, 1954. Allen supported a $40 million bond issue to not only build a baseball stadium in Chavez Ravine but also construct a zoo and golf course there.

Preceded by Carl C. Rasmussen	Los Angeles City Council; 7th District; 1947–1956	Succeeded by James C. Corman
