= Vermont Square, Los Angeles =

Vermont Square
- Neighborhood of Los Angeles
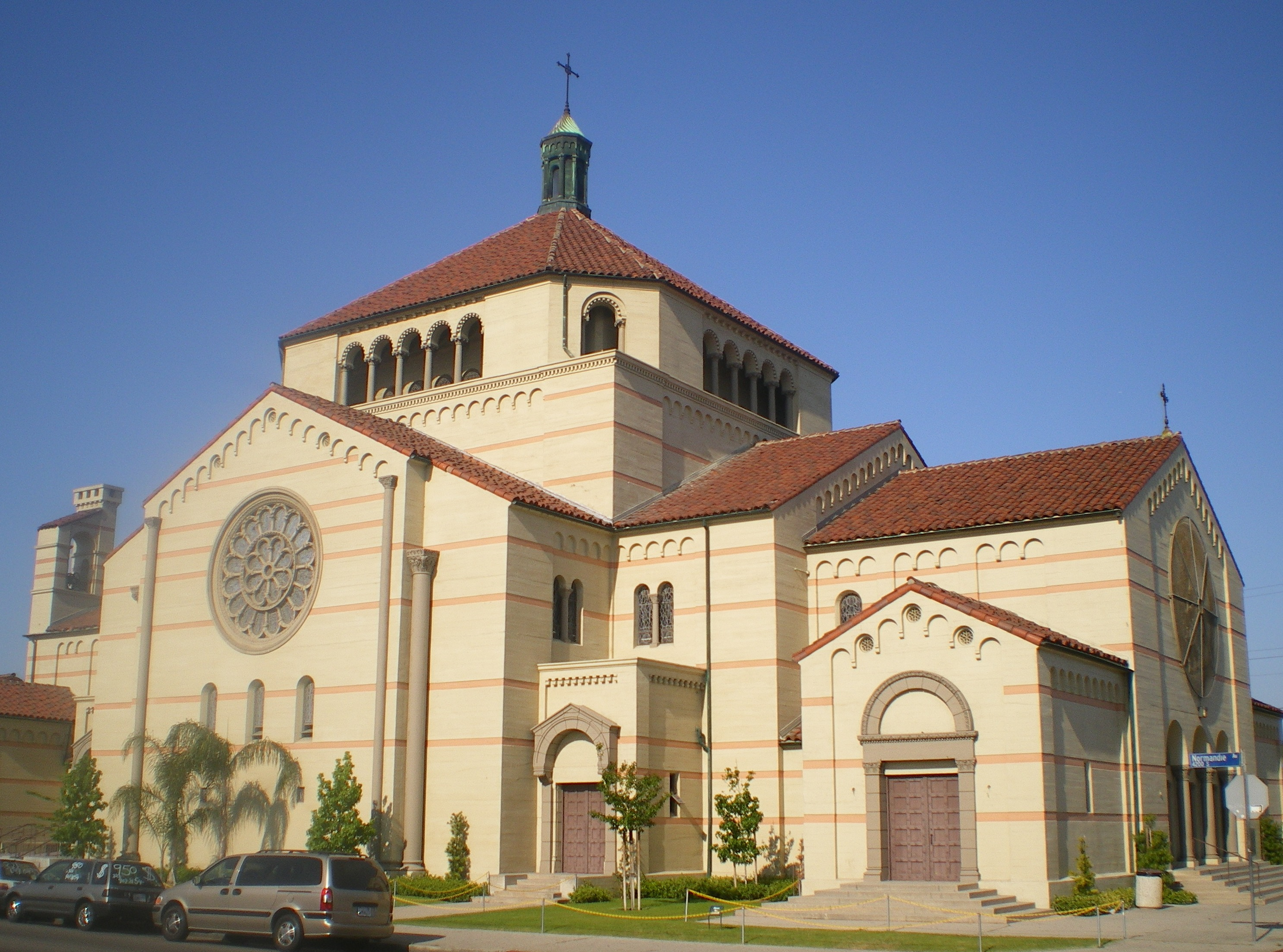
- St. Cecilia Catholic Church

- Location within Central Los Angeles
- Coordinates: 33°59′59″N 118°17′45″W
- Country: United States
- State: California
- County: Los Angeles
- City: Los Angeles
- Time zone: Pacific
- Zip Code: 90037, 90062
- Area code: 323

Vermont Square is a neighborhood in Los Angeles, California, within the South Los Angeles region. The Vermont Square Branch library, a designated Historic–Cultural Monument, is located in the community.

== History ==
Vermont Square was originally called Vermont Avenue Square in 1909.

In 1910, the Southwest Land Company shortened the name to Vermont Square.

In 1911, the Southwest Land Company advertised a "new" Vermont Square, which extended Vermont Square further west.

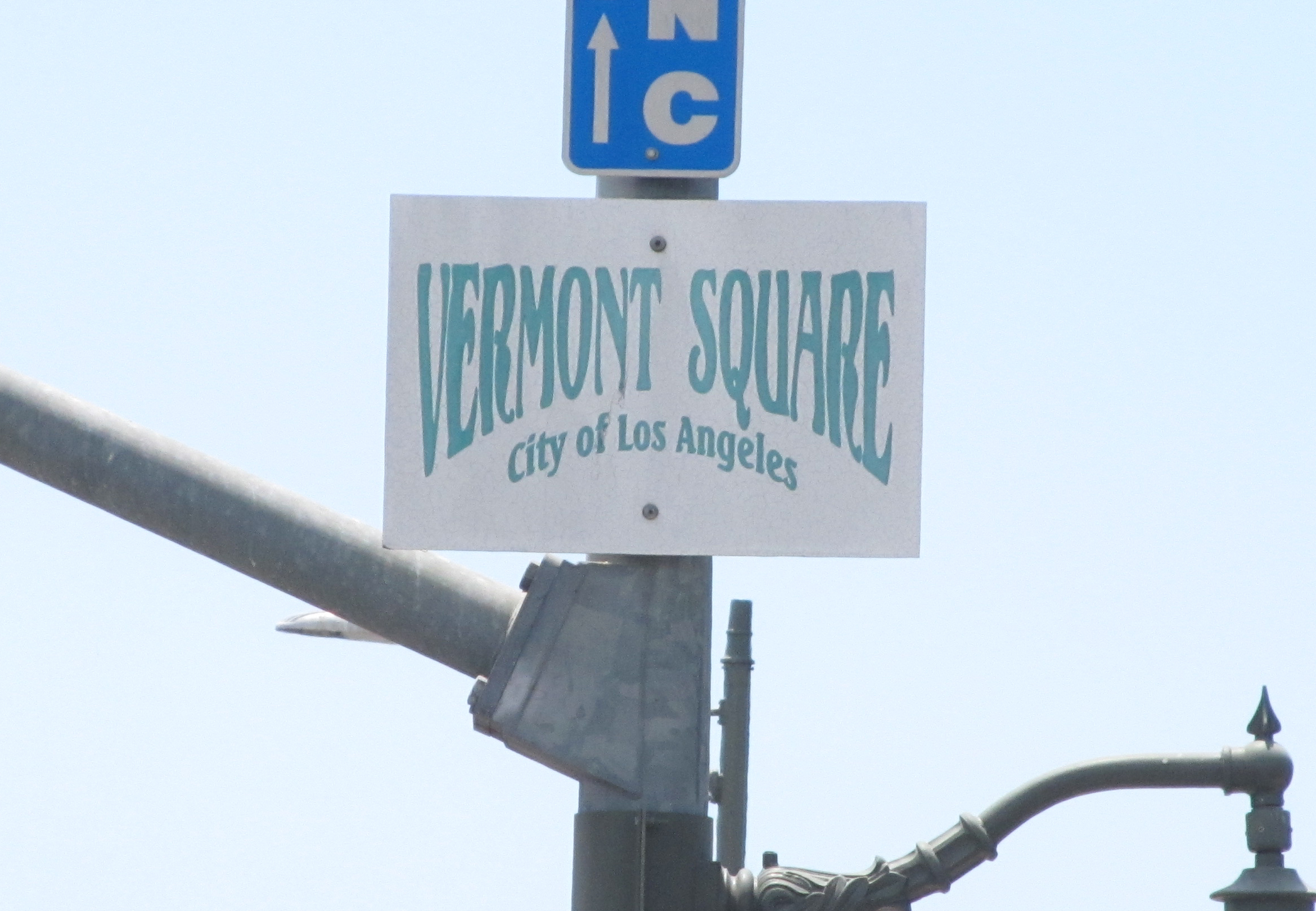
Vermont Square signage, 2017. The sign uses a lettering style similar to the 1910 advertisement.

In 1909, the Southwest Land Company originally advertised the neighborhood under the name "Vermont Avenue Square". It was centered on Vernon Street between Vermont Avenue and Normandie Avenue. In 1910, the name was shortened to "Vermont Square" and the western boundary was extended to Western Avenue. In 1911, the Southwest Land Company advertised a "new" Vermont Square which extended the western boundary from Western Avenue to Arlington Avenue and placed a northern boundary at Santa Barbara Boulevard (present-day King Boulevard).

In the 1920s, the neighborhood was home to lower-middle-class white families. After World War II, African Americans began moving into the community. In the 1980s, Latino families began moving in.

As late as 1969, the name Vermont Square was still being used by local businesses.

In 1996, the community got a LANI (Los Angeles Neighborhood Initiative) grant to install trees, streetlights and bus shelters.

In the 1997, in an effort to distinguish the area from South Central Los Angeles, residents of Vermont Square met with historian Gregory Fischer to discuss neighborhood signage. Fischer had helped design historic signage for the Victoria Park neighborhood. Vermont Square signage is installed on Vermont Avenue at King Boulevard. The sign uses a lettering style similar to the 1910 advertisements.

In December 2000, Vermont Square Park was refurbished at a cost of $20,000. Lights were repaired, trees were trimmed, sandboxes graded and gazebos freshly painted. On April 19, 2002, the Vermont Square Community Garden was dedicated, with Councilperson Jan Perry in attendance. Funded by an $80,000 grant from the S.Mark Taper Foundation, it was the first community garden in South Los Angeles.

== Geography ==
When the neighborhood was developed, the boundaries were: Santa Barbara Street (present-day King Boulevard) on the north, Vermont Avenue on the east, Vernon on the south, and Arlington Avenue on the east (The eastern boundary was originally Normandie Avenue in 1909, extened to Western Avenue in 1910 and then to Arlington Avenue in 1911).

In 1997, The Los Angeles Times defined the neighborhood as a 3-mile area, approximately bounded by Martin Luther King Jr. Boulevard on the north, Hoover Street on the east, Slauson Avenue on the south and Arlington Avenue on the west.

== Demographics ==
A total of 42,284 people lived in Vermont Square's 2.54 square miles, according to the 2000 U.S. census—averaging 17,798 people per square mile, among the highest population densities in the city as a whole. Population was estimated at 47,555 in 2008. The median age was 26, considered young when compared to the city as a whole. The percentages of young residents, aged birth to 18, were among the county's highest. Within the neighborhood, Latinos made up 58.5% of the population, with black people at 39.2%, whites 1.4%, Asian 1.1%, and other 1.8%. Mexico and El Salvador were the most common places of birth for the 38.5% of the residents who were born abroad, an average percentage of foreign-born when compared with the city or county as a whole.

The $29,904 median household income in 2008 dollars was considered low for the city and county. The percentage of households earning $20,000 or less was high, compared to the county at large. The average household size of 3.4 people was high for the city. Renters occupied 63.2% of the housing units, and homeowners occupied the rest.

In 2000, there were 2,519 families headed by single parents, or 26.7%, a rate that was high for the county and the city.

Vermont Square residents with a four-year college degree amounted to 5.3% of the population aged 25 and older in 2000, which was a low figure when compared with the city and the county at large; the percentage of those residents with less than a high school diploma was high for the county.

== Education ==
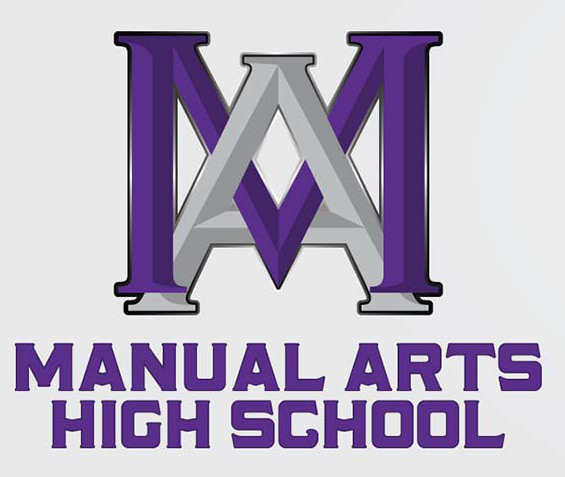
Manuel Arts High Logo

LAUSD has 12 schools within Vermont Square. They are:

- Manual Arts Senior High School, LAUSD, 4131 South Vermont Avenue, a high school just across the street from the Los Angeles Memorial Coliseum
- Manual Arts Community Adult School, LAUSD, 4131 South Vermont Avenue
- Barack Obama Global Preparatory Charter Academy, LAUSD, 1708 West 46th Street
- Lou Dantzler Preparatory Charter Middle School, LAUSD, 5029 South Vermont Avenue
- Global Education Academy, LAUSD charter, 4141 South Figueroa Street
- Menlo Avenue Elementary School, LAUSD, 4156 Menlo Avenue
- Normandie Avenue Elementary School, LAUSD, 4506 South Raymond Avenue
- Dr. James Edward Jones Primary Center, LAUSD, 1017 West 47th Street
- Garr Academy of Math and Entrepreneurial Studies, LAUSD charter, 5101 South Western Avenue
- Fifty-Second Street Elementary School, LAUSD, 816 West 51st Street
- Western Avenue Elementary School, LAUSD, 1724 West 53rd Street
- Lou Dantzler Preparatory Charter Elementary School, LAUSD, 1260 West 36th Street

== Parks and Libraries ==
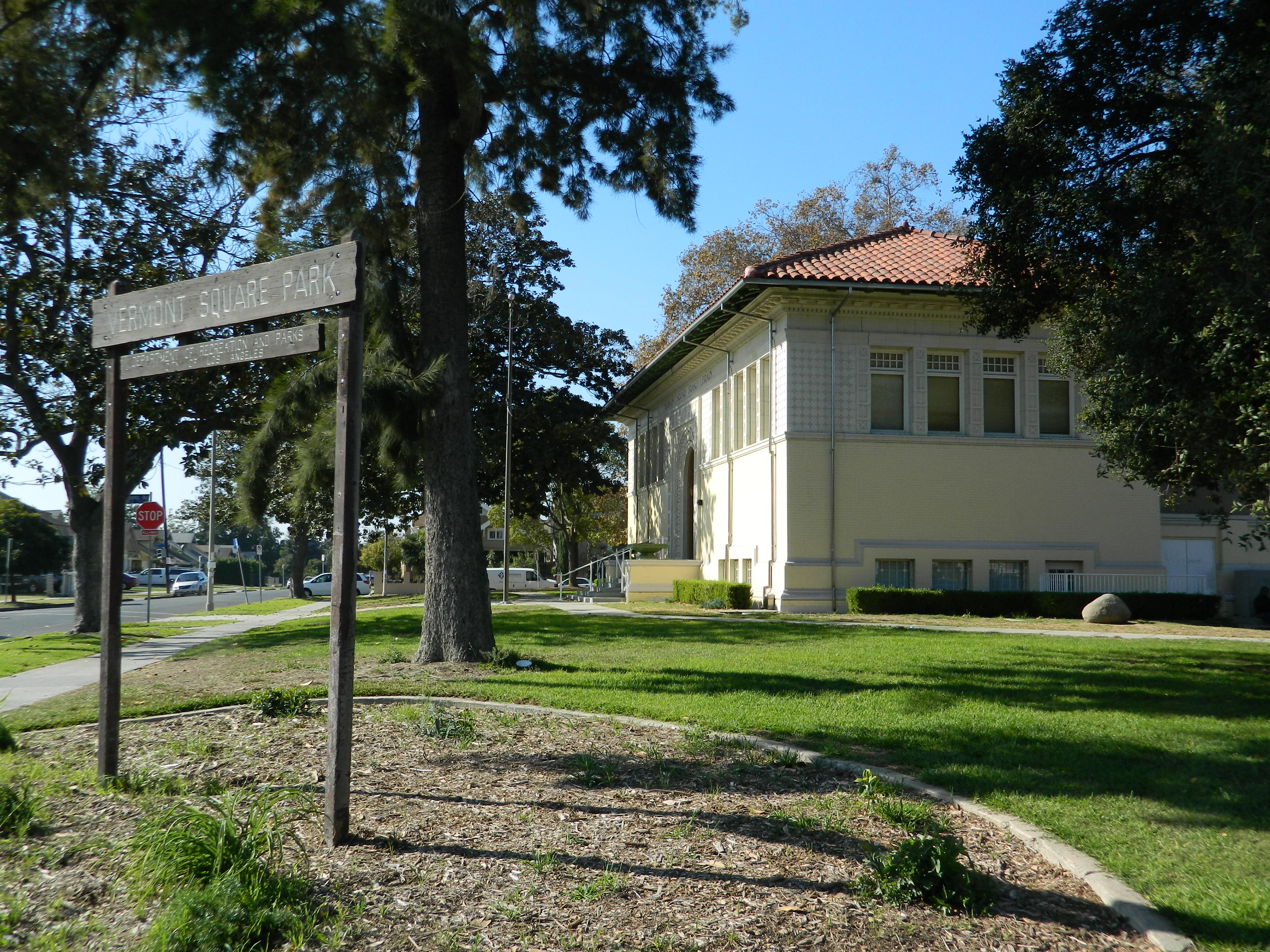
The 1913 Vermont Square Branch Library sits in Vermont Square Park.

- 49th Street Park - 670 E. 49th Street. It features a children's play area and benches.
- Vermont Square Park - 1248 West 47th Street. It is opposite the Vermont Square branch library. It contains barbecue pits, basketball courts, a children's play area and picnic tables.
- The Vermont Square Branch Library - 1201 W. 48th Street. The oldest branch library in the Los Angeles Public Library system, it was built in 1913 with a grant from Andrew Carnegie and is one of three surviving Carnegie libraries in Los Angeles. It is a designated a Historic–Cultural Monument and listed on the National Register of Historic Places. To direct visitors, there is city-installed signage on Vermont Avenue at 48th Street , on King Boulevard at Budlong Avenue, and on Normandie Avenue at 48th Street.

== Notable people ==
- Will H. Kindig, City Council member
- Maxine Waters, member of Congress
- Jackson Pollock, Painter
- Schoolboy Q, Rapper

== See also ==
- List of districts and neighborhoods in Los Angeles
