= Los Angeles's 2nd City Council district =

American legislative district

Councilmember
Adrin Nazarian; D–Sherman Oaks
since December 9, 2024
- Demographics: 42.9% White; 4.6% Black; 43% Hispanic; 6.7% Asian; 0.3% Other
- Population (2020): 250,481
- Registered voters (2017): 136,205
- Website: cd2.lacity.gov

Los Angeles's 2nd City Council district is one of the fifteen districts in the Los Angeles City Council. It is currently represented by Democrat Adrin Nazarian since 2024, previous councilmember Paul Krekorian is term limited.

The district was created in 1925 after a new city charter was passed, which replaced the former "at large" voting system for a nine-member council with a district system with a 15-member council. Between 1923 and 1987, District 1 represented all, then parts, of the San Fernando Valley. Beginning its existence in the Hollywood area, it now covers much of the far eastern and southeastern portions of the San Fernando Valley and parts of the Crescenta Valley.

== Geography ==
The 2nd district stretches from the hills of Studio City to the edge of Verdugo Mountains Park in Sun Valley. It includes North Hollywood, Studio City, Sun Valley, Valley Village, Van Nuys and Valley Glen.

=== Historical boundaries ===
The district was preceded by the second ward, first established in 1870 when the city was first incorporated. During the ward system in place from 1870 to 1889, it elected three (four from 1874 to 1878) to the Los Angeles Common Council. The second ward included the northern part of Los Angeles that wasn't included in the 1st ward. The district was obsolete when the at-large district was first established in 1889.

From 1889 to 1909, the ward was re-established, with the boundaries at the Los Angeles River, Downey Avenue, and San Fernando Road. It included the neighborhoods of Elysian Park, Angelino Heights, and Echo Park. It elected one member through a plurality vote before the ward became obsolete when the at-large district was re-established again in 1909.

In 1925, the district was created and was situated at Hollywood south of Franklin Avenue or Hollywood Boulevard and north of Santa Monica Boulevard, and Los Feliz. The district headquarters was at 2495 Glendower Avenue. In 1928, the boundaries were at Vermont Avenue. South boundary: Melrose Avenue to Seward Street, Fountain Avenue, north of Beverly Hills. West boundary: Beverly Glen By 1937, it was bounded on the north by the Hollywood Hills, south by Melrose Avenue, east by the 1st district and west by Beverly Glen Boulevard. In 1940, it was extended to include Griffith Park before extending again to include Riverside Drive and Studio City.

By 1955, it had Hollywood and a "sizable portion" of the San Fernando Valley, generally west of Ventura Boulevard and extending north to Encino. In 1960, the district was divested of its Hollywood area, which was instead attached to the 13th District. Its boundaries moved north and west, taking over Encino and parts of Van Nuys and North Hollywood. By 1975, the district was no longer representing Hollywood, but instead Sherman Oaks, Studio City, the Los Feliz district and Atwater Village. In 1979, the district was described as a "mixture of wealth and earthier life-styles that reaches from the San Diego Freeway through the Santa Monica Mountains to Griffith Park and beyond." The communities of Atwater Village, North Hollywood and Los Feliz were included in it, as well as the more affluent part of Studio City and Hollywood Hills. In 1982, the district straddled the Santa Monica Mountains east of the San Diego Freeway, taking in Sherman Oaks, Studio City, North Hollywood and the canyons north of Beverly Hills between Beverly Drive and Laurel Canyon Boulevard. Atwater, Glassell Park, Highland Park and Mount Washington were added while Benedict Canyon, Los Feliz and Hollywood were removed.

In 1986, with the death of Howard Finn in the 1st district, the district was moved to near Downtown to provide for election of a Hispanic, with the 2nd and 7th districts taking over the old area. Since then, the district has been situated in San Fernando Valley, extending from Studio City on the south, through Van Nuys to Sunland-Tujunga. In 2001, it extended to include La Tuna Canyon, with parts of Sun Valley, North Hollywood, Arleta, Lake View Terrace, Panorama City, Mission Hills, North Hills, Valley Village, Studio City and Van Nuys. In 2003, it had parts of Sherman Oaks, Valley Glen, North Hollywood, Lake View Terrace, Shadow Hills, La Tuna Canyon, and Van Nuys. In 2012, it no longer included Sunland-Tujunga, La Tuna Canyon, Lakeview Terrace, Shadow Hills and Sherman Oaks. It picked up nearly all of North Hollywood, Studio City and Valley Village, in addition to the NoHo Arts District, and portions of Campo de Cahuenga and the Universal City Metro station.

== List of members representing the district ==
=== 1889–1909 ===
Councilmember	Party	Years	Electoral history
Single-member ward created 1889.
George P. McLain (Civic Center)	Republican	February 25, 1889 – December 5, 1890	Elected in 1889. [data missing]
Daniel Innes (Angelino Heights)	Democratic	December 5, 1890 – December 12, 1894	Elected in 1890. Re-elected in 1892. Lost re-election.
Meredith P. Snyder (Downtown)	Democratic	December 12, 1894 – December 16, 1896	Elected in 1894. Retired to run for Mayor of Los Angeles.
Fred L. Baker (Wilshire Center)	Republican	December 16, 1896 – December 12, 1900	Elected in 1896. Re-elected in 1898. Retired.
George P. McLain (Civic Center)	Republican	December 12, 1900 – December 5, 1902	Elected in 1900. [data missing]
Chauncey F. Skilling (Mid City)	Republican	December 5, 1902 – December 8, 1904	Elected in 1902. [data missing]
Percy V. Hammon (Victor Heights)	Republican	December 8, 1904 – December 13, 1906	Elected in 1904. Retired to run for California State Assembly.
Edward A. Clampitt (Wilshire Center)	Republican	December 13, 1906 – December 10, 1909	Elected in 1906. Retired.
Single-member ward eliminated in 1909.

=== 1925–present ===
Councilmember	Party	Dates	Electoral history
District established July 1, 1925
Robert M. Allan (Hollywood)	Republican	July 1, 1925 – June 30, 1927	Redistricted from the at-large district and re-elected in 1925. Lost re-election.
Arthur Alber (Hollywood)	Republican	July 1, 1927 – June 30, 1929	Elected in 1927. Retired.
Thomas F. Cooke (Hollywood Hills)	Republican	July 1, 1929 – June 30, 1931	Elected in 1929. Lost re-election.
James M. Hyde (Hollywood)	Republican	July 1, 1931 – June 30, 1939	Elected in 1931. Re-elected in 1935. Lost re-election.
Norris J. Nelson (Hollywood)	Republican	July 1, 1939 – June 30, 1943	Elected in 1939. Re-elected in 1943. Retired to join the United States Army.
Lloyd G. Davies (Hollywood)	Republican	July 1, 1943 – June 30, 1951	Elected in 1943. Re-elected in 1945. Re-elected in 197. Re-elected in 1949. Lost re-election.
Earle D. Baker (Hollywood Hills)	Republican	July 1, 1951 – June 30, 1959	Elected in 1951. Re-elected in 1953. Re-elected in 1955. Lost re-election.
Lemoine Blanchard (North Hollywood)	Republican	July 1, 1959 – June 30, 1963	Elected in 1959. Lost re-election.
James B. Potter Jr. (North Hollywood)	Republican	July 1, 1963 – June 30, 1971	Elected in 1963. Re-elected in 1967. Lost re-election.
Joel Wachs (Studio City)	Republican	July 1, 1971 – August 28, 1992	Elected in 1971. Re-elected in 1975. Re-elected in 1979. Re-elected in 1981. Re-elected in 1985. Re-elected in 1987. Re-elected in 1991. Re-elected in 1995. Re-elected in 1999. Resigned.
Joel Wachs (Studio City)	Independent	August 28, 1992 – October 1, 2001	Elected in 1971. Re-elected in 1975. Re-elected in 1979. Re-elected in 1981. Re-elected in 1985. Re-elected in 1987. Re-elected in 1991. Re-elected in 1995. Re-elected in 1999. Resigned.
Vacant		October 1, 2001 – March 5, 2002	
Wendy Greuel (Studio City)	Democratic	March 5, 2002 – June 30, 2009	Elected to finish Wach's term. Re-elected in 2003. Re-elected in 2007. Retired to run for City Controller.
Vacant		June 30, 2009 – December 8, 2009	Chief Legislative Analyst Gerry F. Miller appointed as caretaker until next election.
Paul Krekorian (Toluca Lake)	Democratic	December 8, 2009 – December 9, 2024	Elected to finish Greuel's term. Re-elected in 2011. Re-elected in 2015. Retired due to term limits.
Adrin Nazarian (Sherman Oaks)	Democratic	December 9, 2024 – present	Elected in 2024.
