= George McLain =

George McLain may refer to:

- George P. McLain (1847–1930), Civil War veteran and member of the Los Angeles City Council
- George H. McLain (1901–1965), United States Democratic politician from California
