= Iantha, Missouri =

Unincorporated community in Missouri, U.S.

- Census-Designated Place
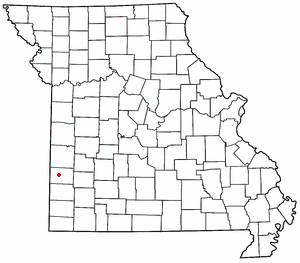
- Location of Iantha in Missouri
- Coordinates: 37°31′01″N 94°23′52″W
- Country: United States
- State: Missouri
- County: Barton

Area
  - Total: 0.27 sq mi (0.70 km^{2})
  - Land: 0.27 sq mi (0.70 km^{2})
  - Water: 0 sq mi (0.00 km^{2})
- Elevation: 988 ft (301 m)

Population (2020)
  - Total: 95
  - Density: 351/sq mi (135.6/km^{2})
- FIPS code: 29-34192
- GNIS feature ID: 2806381

Iantha (/aɪˈænθə/ eye-AN-thə) is an unincorporated community and census designated place in Barton County, Missouri. It is located six miles west of Lamar.

== History ==
Iantha was founded in 1881. The community most likely was named after an early settler. A post office called Iantha was established in 1881, and remained in operation until 1885.

== Demographics ==
Historical population
Census	Pop.	Note	%±
2020	95		—
U.S. Decennial Census

Iantha first appeared as a census designated place in the 2020 U.S. census.

== Notable person ==
- Earle D. Baker (1888–1987), Los Angeles City Council member, born in Iantha
