= Barnsdall Art Park =

Park in Los Angeles, California

Coordinates: 34.100167°N 118.29414°W

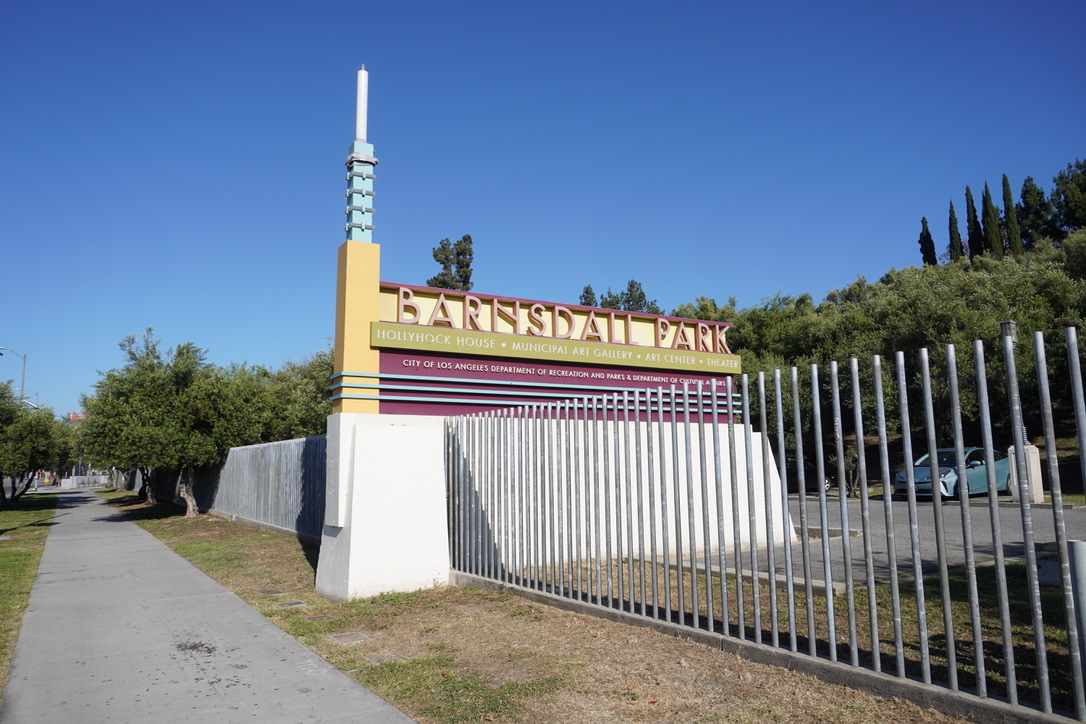
Sign, facing Hollywood Blvd.

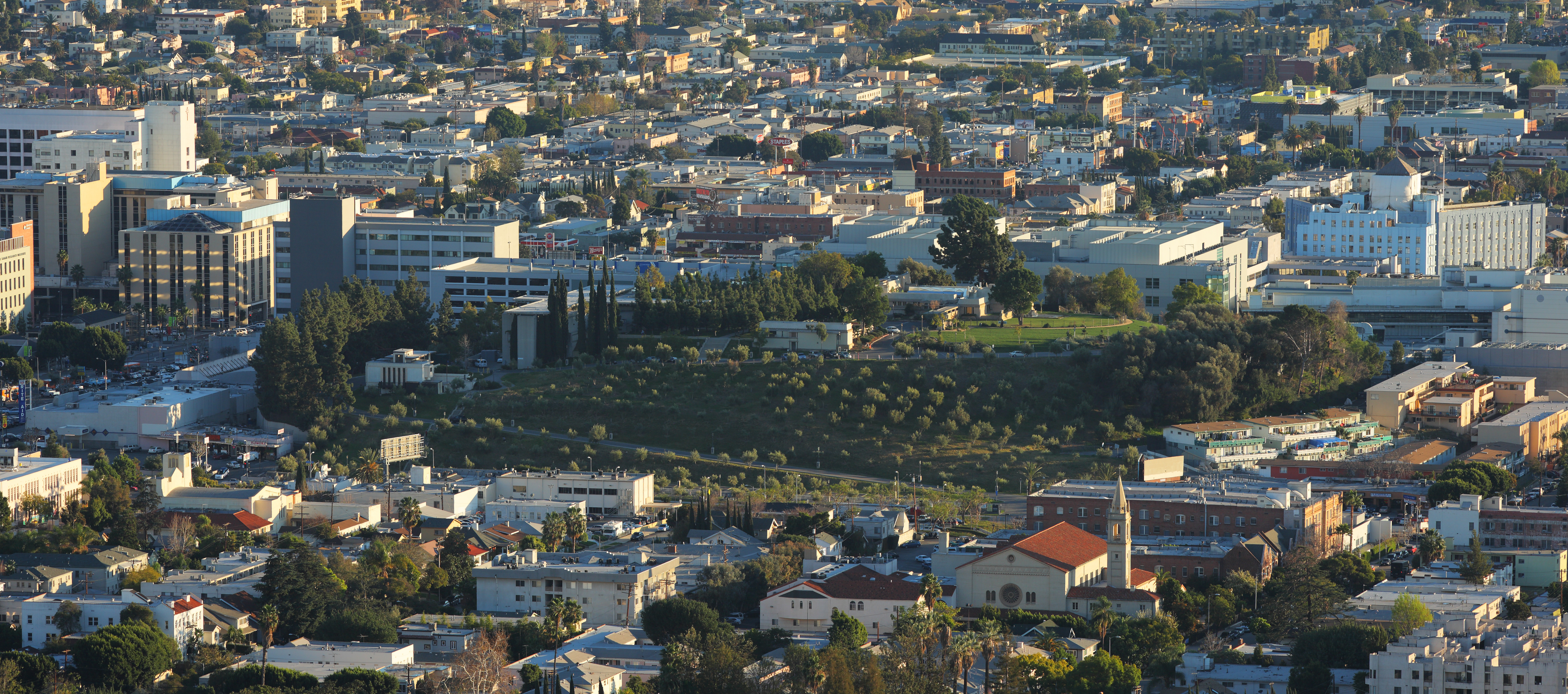
Barnsdall Art Park viewed from the north

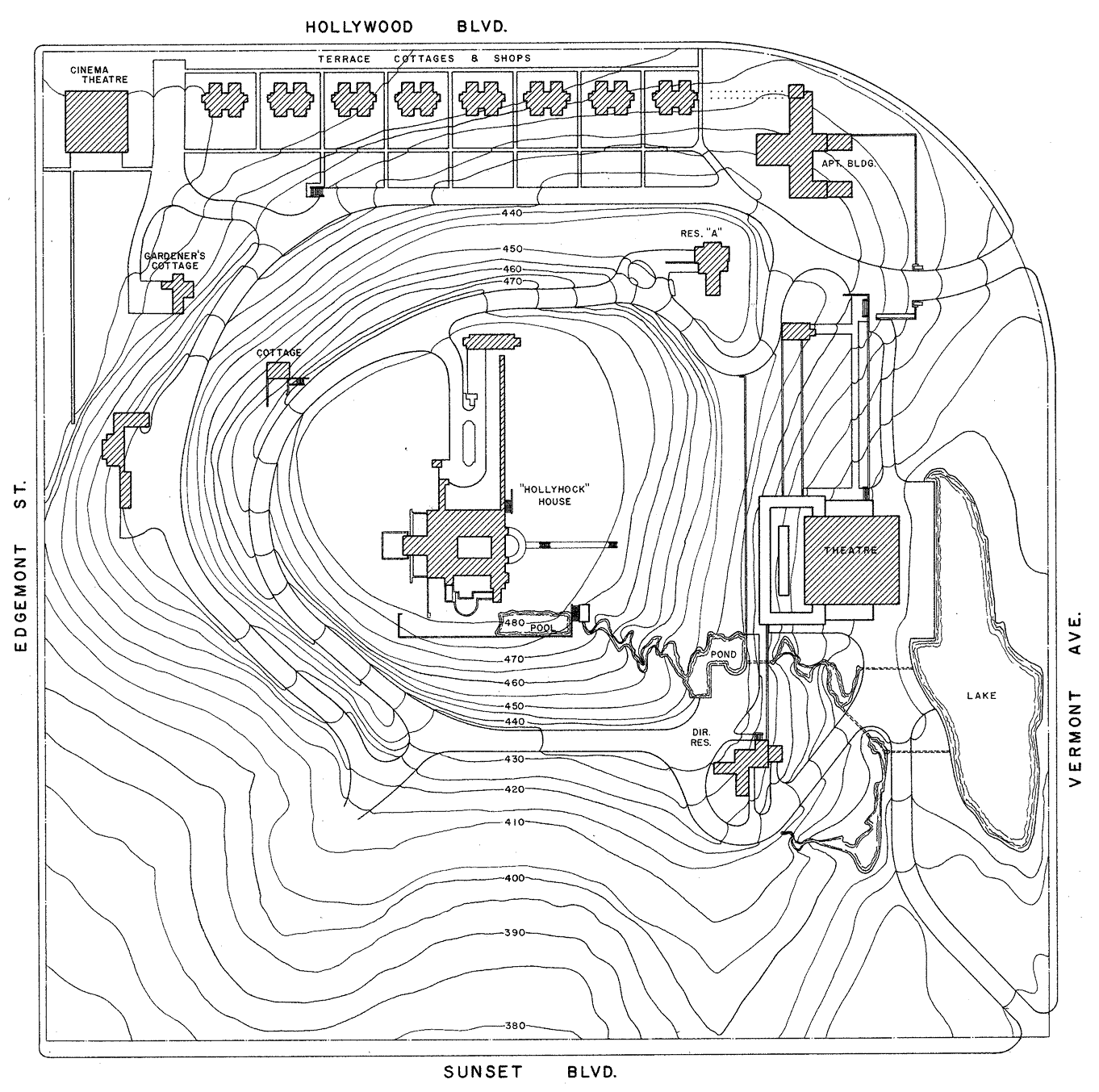
The 1919 Barnsdall Art Park plot plan

Barnsdall Art Park is a city park located in the East Hollywood neighborhood of Los Angeles, California. Parking and arts buildings access is from Hollywood Boulevard on the north side of the park. The park is a Los Angeles Historic-Cultural Monument, and a facility of the City of Los Angeles Department of Cultural Affairs. The Barnsdall Art Park Foundation, a nonprofit organization, helps manage Barnsdall Art Park and the activities there.

Aline Barnsdall donated Barnsdall Park to the City of Los Angeles for arts and recreational purposes, including the preservation of the historic architecture and landscape features. Located at the crest of Olive Hill, Barnsdall Art Park overlooks the city of Los Angeles, and the Hollywood Hills, including Griffith Park. The park is centered on Barnsdall's Hollyhock House designed by architect Frank Lloyd Wright, a city and national landmark and World Heritage Site.

== History ==
The site's previous owner, Aline Barnsdall, was an oil heiress from Pennsylvania who had wanted to develop an arts and live-theater complex. Before Barnsdall owned Olive Hill, it was undeveloped and had contained olive trees since the 1890s, when J. H. Spires had planted an olive grove there. Despite being close to streetcar routes, Olive Hill was not appealing to developers because it was not near either Downtown Los Angeles or central Hollywood. The hill had hosted Easter services for years before Barnsdall's acquisition of the site. At the time of Barnsdall's purchase, the olive trees were planted 18 to 20 feet (5.5 to 6.1 m) apart on a grid, and the hill was accessed by two roads from the southeast and northeast.

Barnsdall first met the architect Frank Lloyd Wright in Chicago by 1915, when she hired him to design a building for the Chicago Little Theatre. After vacationing in California, she decided to erect the theatrical building there instead. Barnsdall bought the site in June 1919, and Wright worked on designing Barnsdall's theater and house during that year. Plans for the estate were modified in 1920 to include an apartment house, a building with artists' studios and shops, additional residences, and a cinema. By 1923, Barnsdall had abandoned her plans to develop a theater on the site. Only two guest houses (Residences A and B) were built, of which only the former still exists.

=== Acquisition of land ===
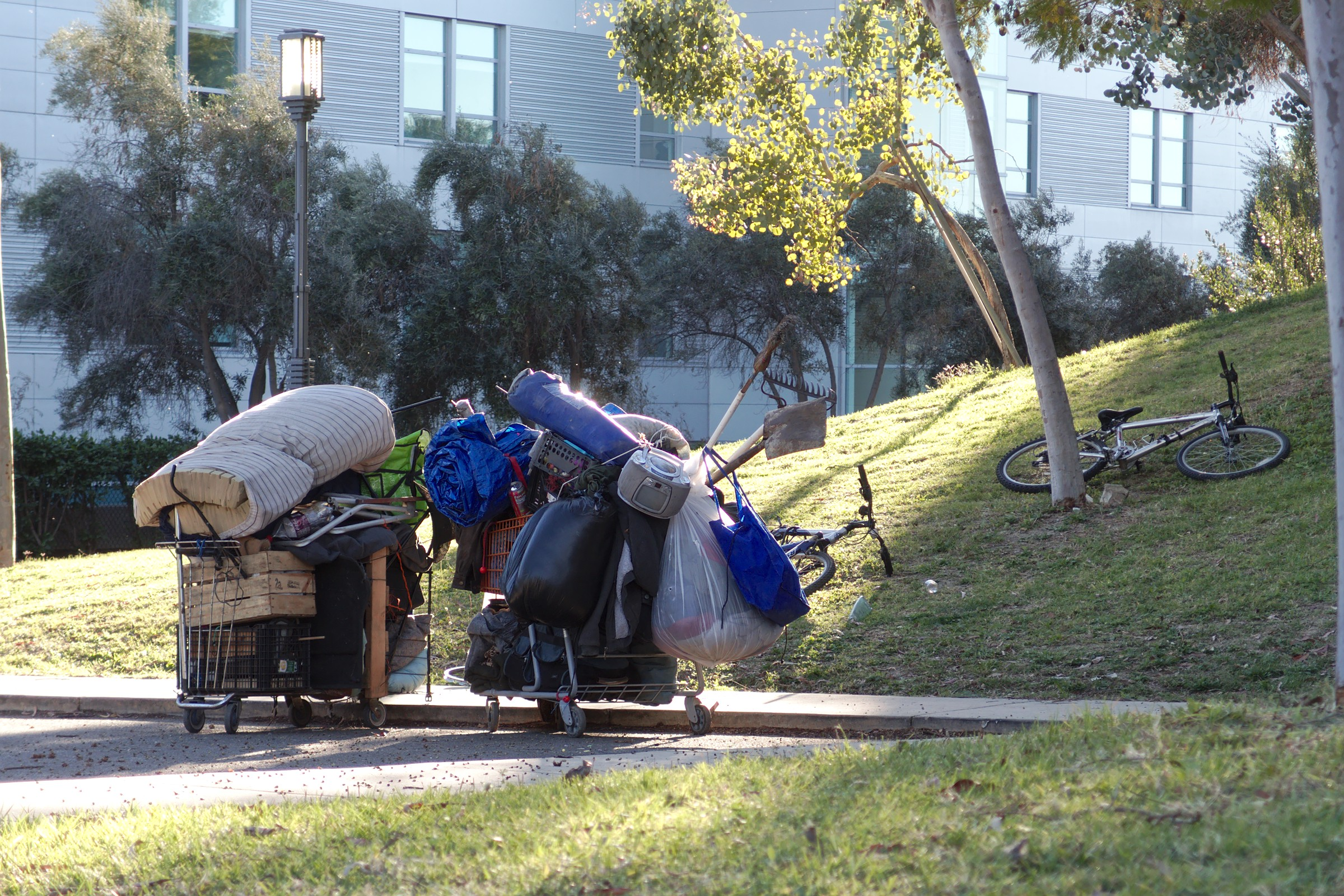
Shopping carts at Art Park

In December 1923, Barnsdall offered to donate Hollyhock House to the city government so the Los Angeles Public Library and the Department of Recreation and Parks could have used the house. The offer included 10 acres (4.0 ha), covering the summit of Olive Hill and the main house. The city government initially accepted the gift but ultimately rejected it in early 1924, saying the terms of her gift were too restrictive. Despite local groups' attempts to buy the rest of Olive Hill, Barnsdall sold some land to a syndicate for $2 million in February 1924; the sale was finalized in May. Barnsdall later offered the house and the remaining land to the city again, this time with few restrictions. The city of Los Angeles accepted the gift on December 22, 1926, along with the surrounding land, which became Barnsdall Art Park. The initial donation covered 9 acres (3.6 ha). The Los Angeles Times wrote at the time that the site was "of much picturesque beauty and eminently suited to the purpose of a playground". The California Art Club leased Hollyhock House as their clubhouse for fifteen years.

Barnsdall proposed constructing a Greek theater in Barnsdall Park in early 1927, which would have had 1,000 seats. Known as the Little Lattice Playhouse, the theater opened in Barnsdall Park in June 1927. The same August, Barnsdall donated Residence A to the city. The donation included 2 acres (0.81 ha) of land, and Barnsdall planned to spend $200,000 erecting a community art theater nearby. Residence A reopened as a recreation building in February 1928. A playground was also added to Barnsdall Park around the same time, hosting competitions and holiday events. In addition, the city's park commission announced in 1929 that it would install ornamental lamps around Barnsdall Park, which were dedicated the next year.

=== 1930s and 1940s ===
In February 1931, Barnsdall offered to donate another 9.12 acres (3.69 ha) at the outer edge of the park to the city of Los Angeles, which would lease it for eight years with an option to buy it for $2 million. The city government agreed to the lease. Local residents objected, citing the fact that they would pay more taxes, and veterans' groups criticized the move because they thought Barnsdall's donation prevented the erection of war monuments. Despite this, the city government formally agreed to obtain the 9-acre plot that March, and it also agreed to lease an adjacent parcel of 12 acres (4.9 ha) for five years. Lloyd Wright designed a 400-seat children's theater and wading pool on the newly acquired land, which would replace the Little Lattice Playhouse. A city attorney invalidated the city's acquisition, claiming that the city could not enter into agreements lasting more than three years. Barnsdall offered to lease 9 acres (3.6 ha) to the city for three years; however, city park officials did not consider this suggestion.

After the city of Los Angeles rejected her donation, Barnsdall then threatened to take back ownership of the entire site, including Hollyhock House, and she sued in October 1931 to take back the land. Local residents requested in 1935 that the Los Angeles city government install picnic shelters at the park. Barnsdall sued the California Art Club in February 1938 in an attempt to take back ownership of Hollyhock House, though she agreed that October to postpone the lawsuit indefinitely. By the next year, Barnsdall tried to sell the land surrounding the house. A judge ruled in 1941 that Barnsdall could take back ownership of Residence B, while the city of Los Angeles could keep the remainder of the Olive Hill estate, including Hollyhock House. The city's land and Barnsdall's property were separated by the park's internal driveway. Barnsdall retained Residence B until her death in 1946, when she bequeathed that residence to her daughter Betty. The will specified that Betty not sell Residence B for ten years, and then not for less than $2 million.

During the mid-1940s, Barnsdall and the city of Los Angeles were involved in a dispute over whether the park's access driveway was partially owned by Barnsdall. Although Barnsdall put barricades on the driveway, ostensibly to protect children, the city ordered her to dismantle them. The dispute led Barnsdall to again threaten to take back control of the entire park, and she was convicted after illegally allowing her dogs to run freely through the park. By 1946, there were proposals to construct a medical school for the University of California, Los Angeles, in Barnsdall Park. Members of a local parent–teacher association cleaned up Barnsdall Park in 1948 after local residents complained about the presence of vagrants. The Los Angeles Fire Department said at the time that the park posed a fire hazard, while the Los Angeles Police Department said the untrimmed shrubbery allowed criminals to hide there. The next year, Los Angeles city councilman Lloyd G. Davies proposed that the city acquire land around Vermont Avenue and Sunset Boulevard, thereby expanding the park, to prevent the redevelopment of that site. In addition, Barnsdall's friend Dorothy Clune Murray offered to buy 23 acres (9.3 ha) around Olive Hill and donate it to the city.

=== 1950s to 1970s ===
In 1950, there was a proposal to redevelop the perimeter of Barnsdall Park as part of a $15 million commercial and residential development called Barnsdall Square. Los Angeles's city planning commission approved the development that September. The southwest corner of the park, at Edgemont Street and Sunset Boulevard, was sold for $200,000 in 1951; the buyers wished to redevelop the site into a hospital. Ultimately, Stiles Clements designed a shopping complex to the east of the park, which became known as Barnsdall Square. The hospital was built to the south, and apartments were built to the west. Frank Lloyd Wright was hired to design an art pavilion next to the original house, which opened in 1954. Residence B was demolished the same year. The annex to Hollyhock House was rededicated in 1956 as the Municipal Art Gallery. The city also created a master plan for Barnsdall Art Park in the 1950s; Wright was hired as a consultant, but the master plan was not carried out.

In 1963, the northeast corner of the park, at Hollywood Boulevard and Vermont Avenue, was redeveloped as a shopping center. During that decade, the Associates for the Municipal Art Gallery was established to host social events at Barnsdall Park and Hollyhock House. A second master plan was published in May 1964. This master plan, designed by Hunter & Benedict and Kahn, Farrell & Associates, called for nine new buildings, which were to be built in four phases. There would be a junior art center, a municipal history museum, a 450-seat auditorium, a workshop building, an administration building, and food concessions. The first phase was funded by about $180,000 in municipal bonds, while the other three phases required $2.5 million in private donations. During the same time, a member of local group Municipal Art Patrons designed a new entrance to the park.

Roland H. Escherich Construction Inc. was hired to build the Junior Art Center, which was planned to cost $370,000; that building opened in May 1967. Plans for a new Municipal Art Gallery was announced in mid-1968 after the city government provided $97,000 for design and $903,500 for construction. The design by Arthur Stephens called for a 21,000-square-foot (2,000 m^{2}) structure with an art gallery, auditorium, offices, and storage space. John E. Meskell was hired in August 1969 to build the gallery, which opened in March 1971. The buildings in the other two phases of the park's renovation were canceled, since there was not enough space to build parking lots for additional visitors.

=== 1980s to present ===
In 1985, a task force recommended that mayor Tom Bradley form a committee to devise plans for Barnsdall Park's future. The city government announced in 1986 that it would renovate Barnsdall Park and had allocated $100,000 for a study into the renovation. Archiplan and Martin Eli Weil were hired to design the renovation. At the time, the park's relatively isolated location made it a frequent hangout for vagrants, and many visitors came from afar because Angelenos tended to ignore it. In addition, management of the park was split between several city-government agencies and organizations. In 1989, Frederick R. Weisman donated $100,000 for the creation of a sculpture garden at Barnsdall Park. The same year, the city installed a $150,000 irrigation system to revitalize the dying olive trees. The park would have received an additional $7 million for restoration as part of California Proposition 1, a $298.8 million bond issue that voters rejected in June 1991.

The Los Angeles County Metropolitan Transportation Authority (LACMTA) constructed Los Angeles Metro Rail's Red Line (now the B Line) under Hollywood Boulevard in the early 1990s. As part of the project, the LACMTA proposed acquiring an adjacent car wash and replacing it with an improved entrance to Barnsdall Park. That September, the Department of Recreation and Parks approved the LACMTA's request to use part of the park as a staging area for the Red Line's construction.

After the 1994 Northridge earthquake, the city government hired the landscape architect Peter Walker and local preservationist Brenda Levin to design a master plan for the park and Hollyhock House. The plans included improving park access, adding fences and lights, expanding the parking lots, replanting olive trees, and constructing an arts terrace. The first phase of the renovation, a $6.8 million project to improve landscaping, was announced in 1998. By the next year, the cost of the project had increased to $20.8 million. The Federal Emergency Management Agency provided $2 million for the restoration, while the LACMTA provided $6.5 million and the city provided $12.3 million. The park was temporarily closed for renovations in 2000, and work on a first phase of restoration was finished in 2003.

In 2020, the park was temporarily closed to the public due to the COVID-19 pandemic in California. The following year, the Barnsdall Art Park Foundation began restore the park's dying olive groves. In addition, both Hollyhock House and Residence A were restored. Hollyhock House reopened in August 2022, while the Barnsdall Arts Center remained closed until July 2024.

== Description ==
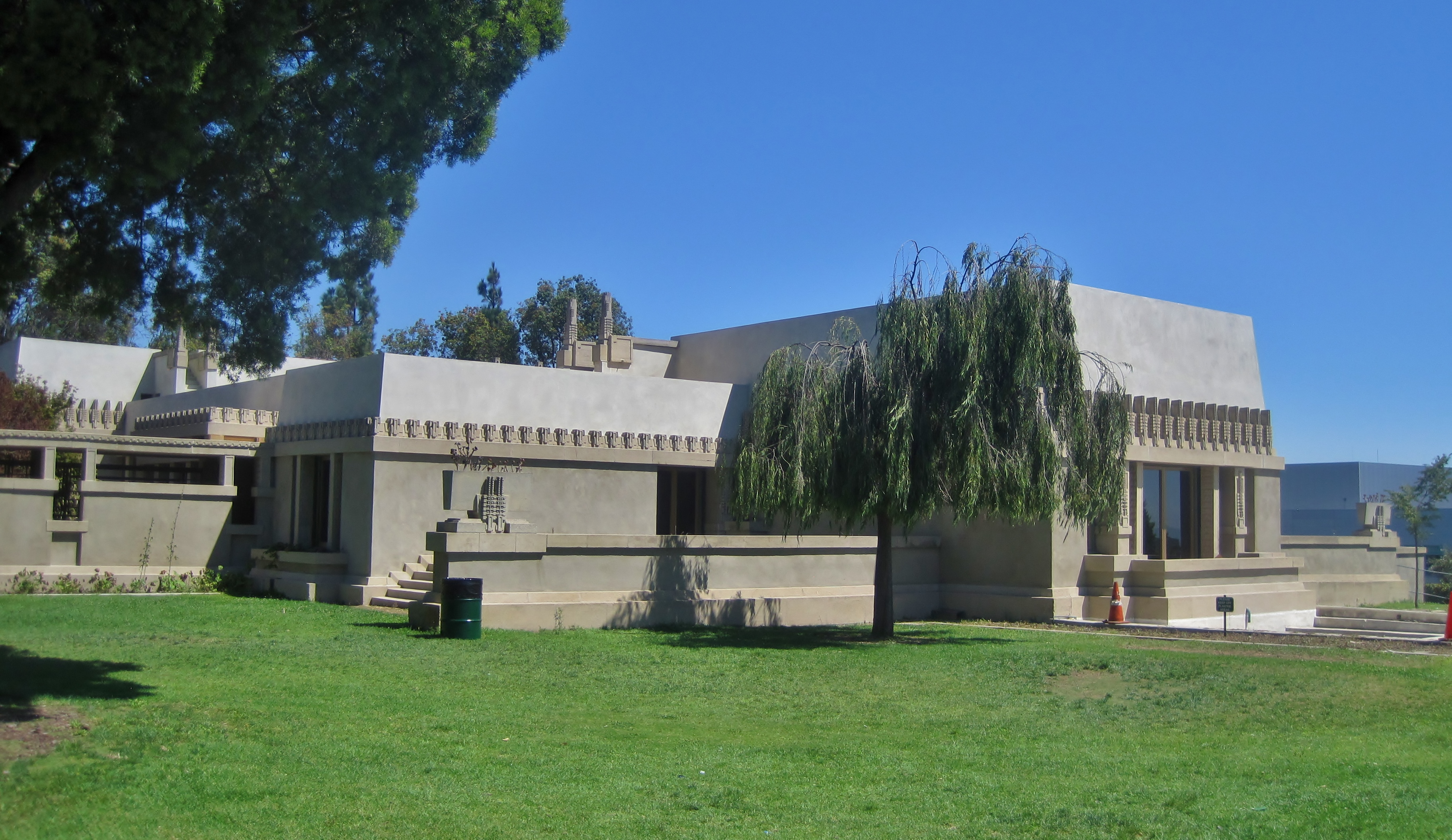
Hollyhock House

Barnsdall Art Park covers 11.5 acres (4.7 ha) of Barnsdall's former Olive Hill estate. The park is at 4800 Hollywood Boulevard, between Vermont Avenue to the east and Edgemont Street to the west. When the site was donated to the city, it contained olive trees, as well as other plantings such as oleanders, hibiscus, and acacias. The park contains several paved pathways, in addition to parking lots at the bottom of Olive Hill.

Due to the park's hilly location and cultural venues, the Los Angeles Times referred to Barnsdall Art Park as the "Acropolis of Los Angeles". In addition to art shows, Barnsdall Art Park hosts events such as Friday-night wine tastings.

=== Hollyhock House ===
The main attraction of the park is Hollyhock House, which is on the northern slope of Olive Hill. Hollyhock House was the first Los Angeles project of Frank Lloyd Wright. Built between 1919 and 1921, it represents his earliest efforts to develop a regionally appropriate style of architecture for Southern California. Taking advantage of the area's mild climate, Hollyhock House combines interior and exterior spaces. The house takes its name from the hollyhock blossom, the favorite flower of Aline Barnsdall. Wright's abstracted hollyhock patterns were incorporated into the residence.

Wright was often absent during the actual construction of Hollyhock House, due to the demands of a major commission, the Imperial Hotel in Tokyo, Japan. Therefore, Wright left his son Lloyd Wright in charge of the project, along with his apprentice Rudolph Schindler. They both became independently renowned architects. Hollyhock House is a Los Angeles Historic-Cultural Monument, a National Historic Landmark, and a World Heritage Site (listed as part of "The 20th-Century Architecture of Frank Lloyd Wright" listing).

=== Other structures ===
Residence A is slightly northeast of Hollyhock House, south the intersection of New Hampshire Street and Hollywood Boulevard. North of the main house is the garage building, which also contains the chauffeur's residence. Residence B was located to the west at 1610 North Edgemont Street, on the western slope of Olive Hill. The Spring House, on Olive Hill's southeastern slope next to the Junior Art Center, is the former refrigeration facility. A trough extends east from the house, connecting with a concrete pool and a dry streambed. Also close by is the Junior Arts Center, which is southeast of Hollyhock House, on the slope. The Barnsdall Gallery Theatre and Los Angeles Municipal Art Gallery are to the north of the Junior Arts Center, on the eastern slope of Olive Hill. West of Hollyhock House is Schindler's Terrace, the site of an unbuilt community theater.

== Los Angeles Municipal Art Gallery ==
The Los Angeles Municipal Art Gallery is a 10,000-square-foot (930 m^{2}) venue that offers exhibition space for large, thematic group exhibitions and retrospective exhibitions of individual work. Completed in 1971, it was designed by Wehmueller and Stephens. The Junior Arts Center Gallery is a 2,000-square-foot (190 m^{2}) venue in the building that offers a smaller gallery space. At times the two galleries are used together for single large-scale exhibitions.

The Municipal Art Gallery's exhibitions program produces approximately nine exhibitions of contemporary art per year. The curatorial focus includes painting, sculpture, photography, architecture, design, video, electronic, performance, and installation works. Exhibits at Barnsdall Park receive over 45,000 visitors annually.

== Barnsdall Gallery Theatre ==
The Barnsdall Gallery Theatre (BGT) has 300 seats. It is owned and operated by Performing Arts in the City of Los Angeles's Department of Cultural Affairs. The proscenium theater is rented at nominal fees to individuals and organizations for live theatre, dance, music, spoken word, lectures, films, and other events.

BGT also presents a variety of community events in the space, including free programs, such as the Independent Shakespeare Company, Music Summer Camps by the Silverlake Conservatory of Music, and many annual festivals, including the Thai Festival and Artwallah.

=== Independent Shakespeare Company ===
The Independent Shakespeare Company (ISC) is an ongoing, free live summer series held on an outdoor stage in the park.

In 2004, in association with the City's Department of Cultural Affairs, the ISC established a residency in Barnsdall Art Park. The first production was The Two Gentlemen of Verona. In October 2004, the ISC toured Richard III in France as part of the 100th anniversary of the Entente Cordiale. This production returned to Los Angeles as part of Free Shakespeare in Barnsdall Art Park 2005, performed in rotation with The Two Gentlemen of Verona and Hamlet. In 2005, the ISC returned to Barnsdall Art Park with a new production of Hamlet, running in repertory with Richard III and encore performances of The Two Gentlemen of Verona. They eventually outgrew Barnsdall and moved their free Shakespeare series to Griffith Park in 2010.

=== Silverlake Conservatory of Music ===
The Silverlake Conservatory of Music presents Music Summer Camps, bringing music to young people at the Barnsdall Gallery Theatre. A team of professional master musicians present a music program combining academic information with live performance. The musicians perform their music and then explain how their instruments fit into the rhythm, chord structure, mood, or melody of a piece. Young people who are interested in a musical career are able to learn from professionals.

== Barnsdall Art Center ==
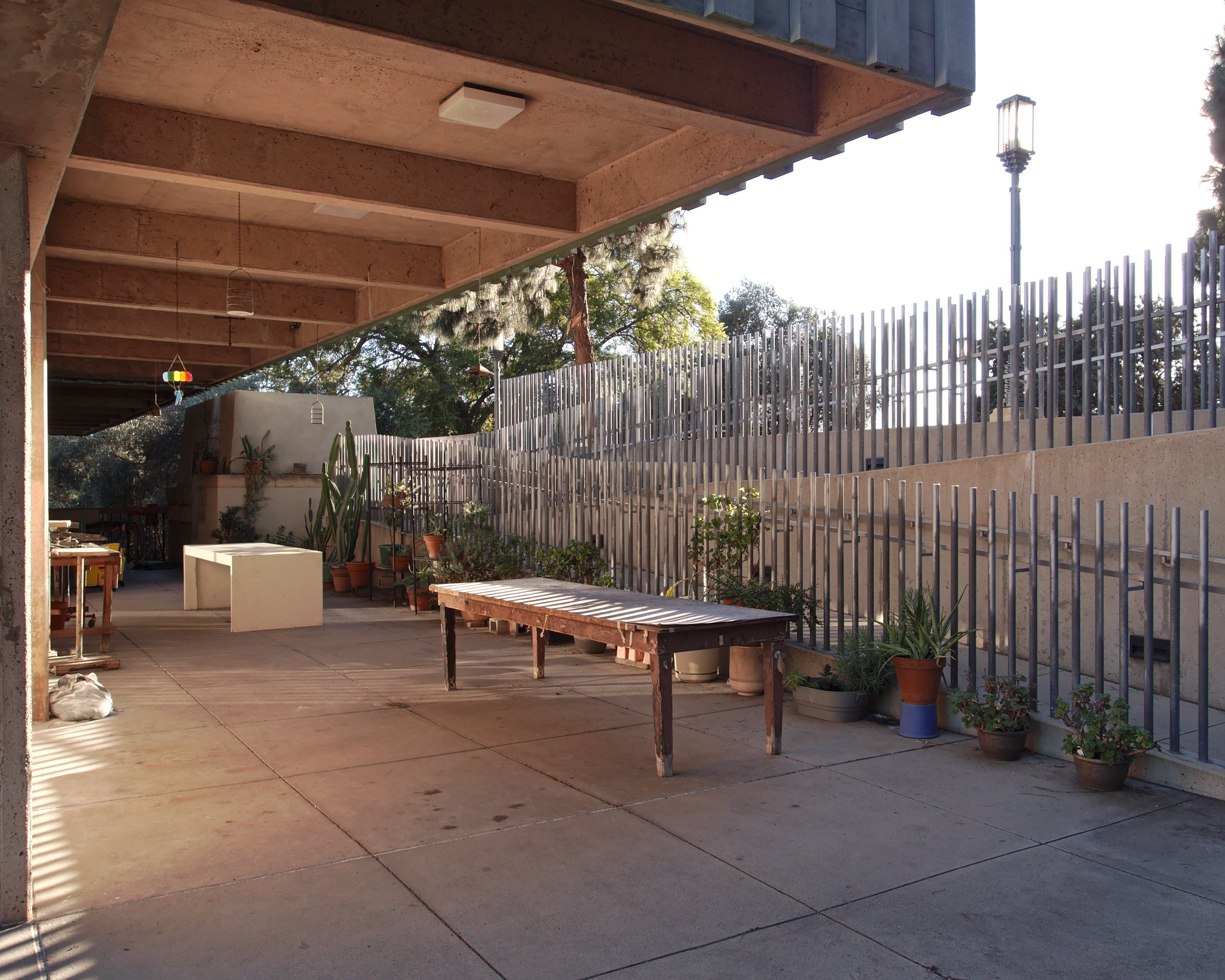
Outdoor work area and patio

The Barnsdall Art Center provides college-level art instruction at low cost. The Barnsdall Art Center Student Advisory Committee provides support and student influence for the center's growth. The non-profit organization provides volunteer services with registration and financial assistance by covering programs and classes that the City is unable to fund.

=== The Junior Arts Center ===
The Junior Arts Center was originally located within an old pump house on the Barnsdall estate. Since 1967, it has been housed in a structure designed by Hunter & Benedict and Kahn, Farrell & Associates. The Junior Arts Center offers art programs to children and youth aged 3–18. Art instruction held at the center throughout the year includes drawing, painting, film making, printmaking, acting, photography, and sculpture. Parent/child classes are also available. The arts center's children's gallery features the work of young artists.

The Junior Arts Center Gallery provides family-oriented exhibitions by both children's and adults' work, as well as interactive family exhibits. Annual special events include Día de los Muertos, Aline Barnsdall Day, the culmination of children's classes, and the Barnsdall Art Center's students exhibit.

== See also ==
- List of Los Angeles Historic-Cultural Monuments in Hollywood
- List of parks in Los Angeles
- Little Armenia, Los Angeles — community to the west
- Lloyd G. Davies — L.A. City Council member (1943–1951) who urged purchase of adjacent land to prevent development
- Eastwood Performing Arts Center
