= Thomas F. Cooke =

American banker and politician (1863-1941)

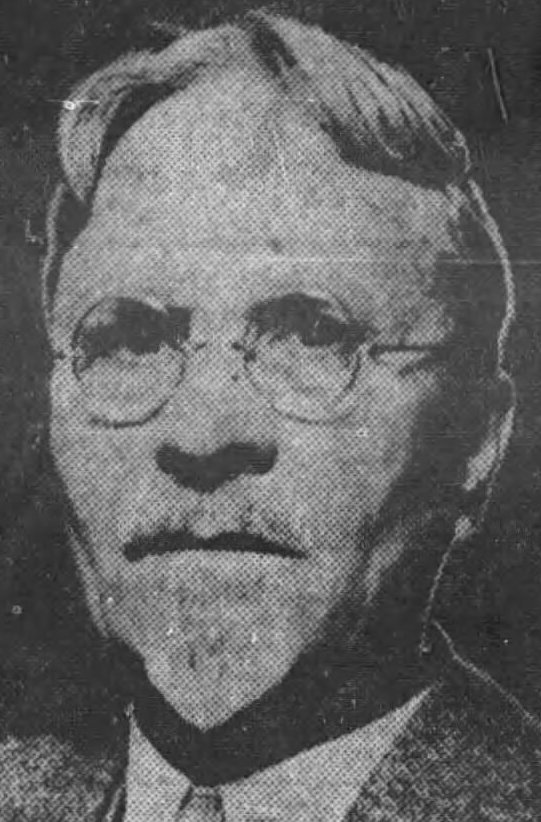
- Cooke in 1929

Member of the Los Angeles City Council from the 2nd district
- In office July 1, 1929 – June 30, 1931
- Preceded by: Arthur Alber
- Succeeded by: James M. Hyde

Personal details
- Born: January 23, 1863 Center Grove, Iowa
- Died: May 14, 1941 (aged 78) Los Angeles, California
- Party: Republican
- Spouse: Nellie Elizabeth Ford (m. 1895)
- Children: 2

Military service
- Allegiance: United States
- Branch/service: United States Army
- Rank: Lieutenant colonel Captain
- Battles/wars: Spanish–American War; World War I

Thomas F. Cooke (January 23, 1863 – May 14, 1941) was an American banker and politician who served on the Los Angeles City Council for the 2nd district from 1929 to 1931.

Cooke joined the United States Army, where he eventually rose to the rank of Lieutenant Colonel, and served in the Spanish–American War. Later, he served in World War I in the Army Quartermaster Corps. Cooke relocated to Los Angeles in 1907, where he worked for the Pacific Southwest Trust and Savings Bank and later for Los Angeles-First National Trust and Savings Bank. Additionally, he was a member of the Hollywood Board of Trade and served as chairman of the 1928 county grand jury, which indicted Los Angeles County District Attorney Asa Keyes.

In 1929, Cooke was elected to the Los Angeles City Council for the 2nd district after the incumbent, Arthur Alber, retired. After a single term, he lost re-election to James M. Hyde, and subsequently retired from politics.

== Early life and military career ==
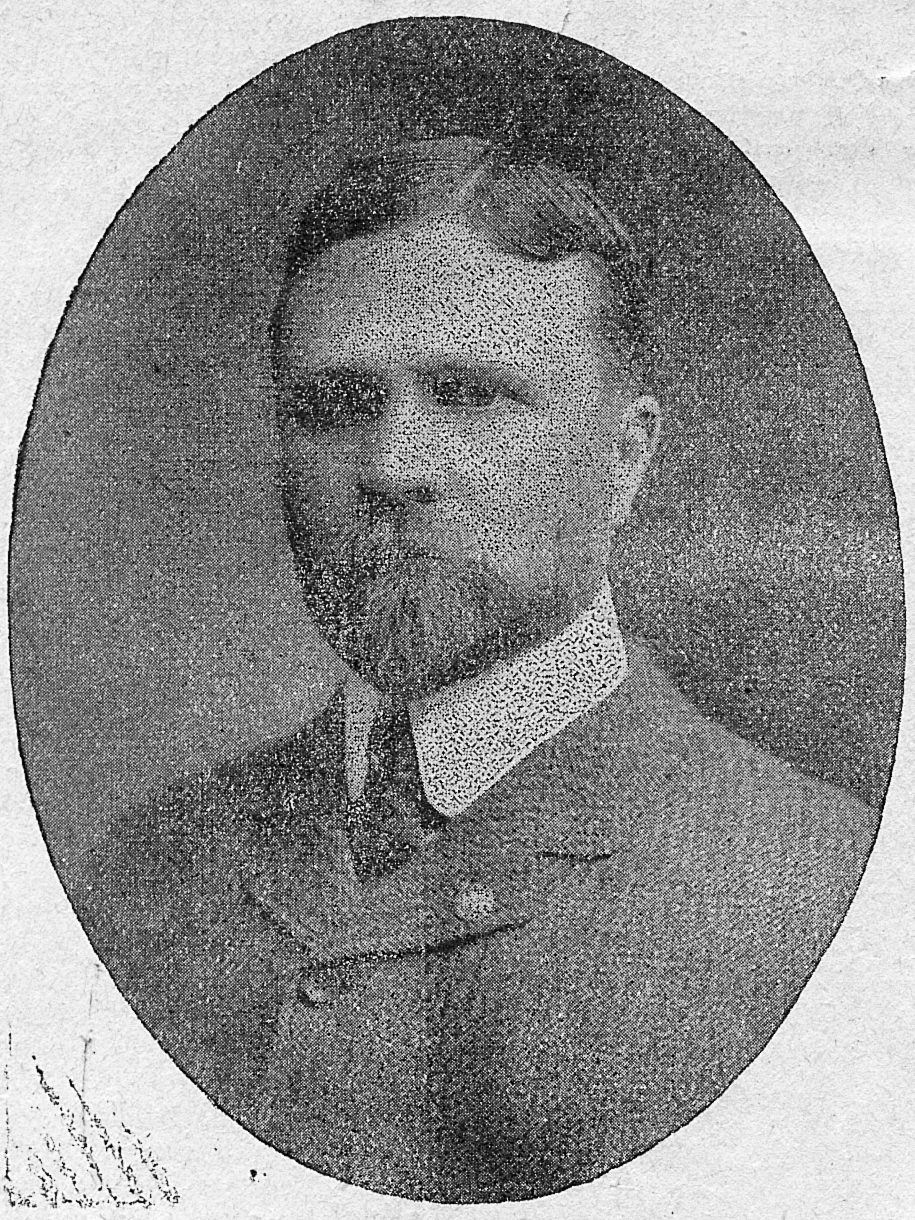
Cooke as a lieutenant colonel in 1904.

Cooke was born on January 23, 1863, in Center Grove, Iowa. His father, David Grant Cooke, served in the 92nd Illinois Volunteer Infantry Regiment and was captured and executed by Nathan Bedford Forrest near Cottage Grove, Tennessee on December 22, 1864. He was raised by his widowed mother and later moved to Algona, Iowa as a young adult to enter the land business.

In 1889, Cooke was notified of a vacancy in the Sixth Regiment of the Iowa Army National Guard by A. D. Clarke. He organized a group of young men to join the company. In 1892, Iowa Governor Horace Boies appointed Cooke as the General Inspector of Small Arms Practice and raised his rank to lieutenant colonel.

At the outbreak of the Spanish–American War on April 21, 1898, Cooke's company was called to serve and ordered to Camp George H. Thomas at Chickamauga, Georgia. Although they never saw battle, Cooke contracted typhoid fever while stationed there. In August 1905, Cooke directed the third annual meeting of the Iowa Rifle Association in Fort Des Moines.

In 1902, Cooke purchased a half interest in the Benham Garment Company and rented a home in Des Moines, though he frequently traveled back and forth to Algona. In 1904, after being elected Lieutenant Colonel of the 56th Regiment for the Iowa National Guard, the family permanently moved to Des Moines and sold their Algona home.

== Move to California and public service ==
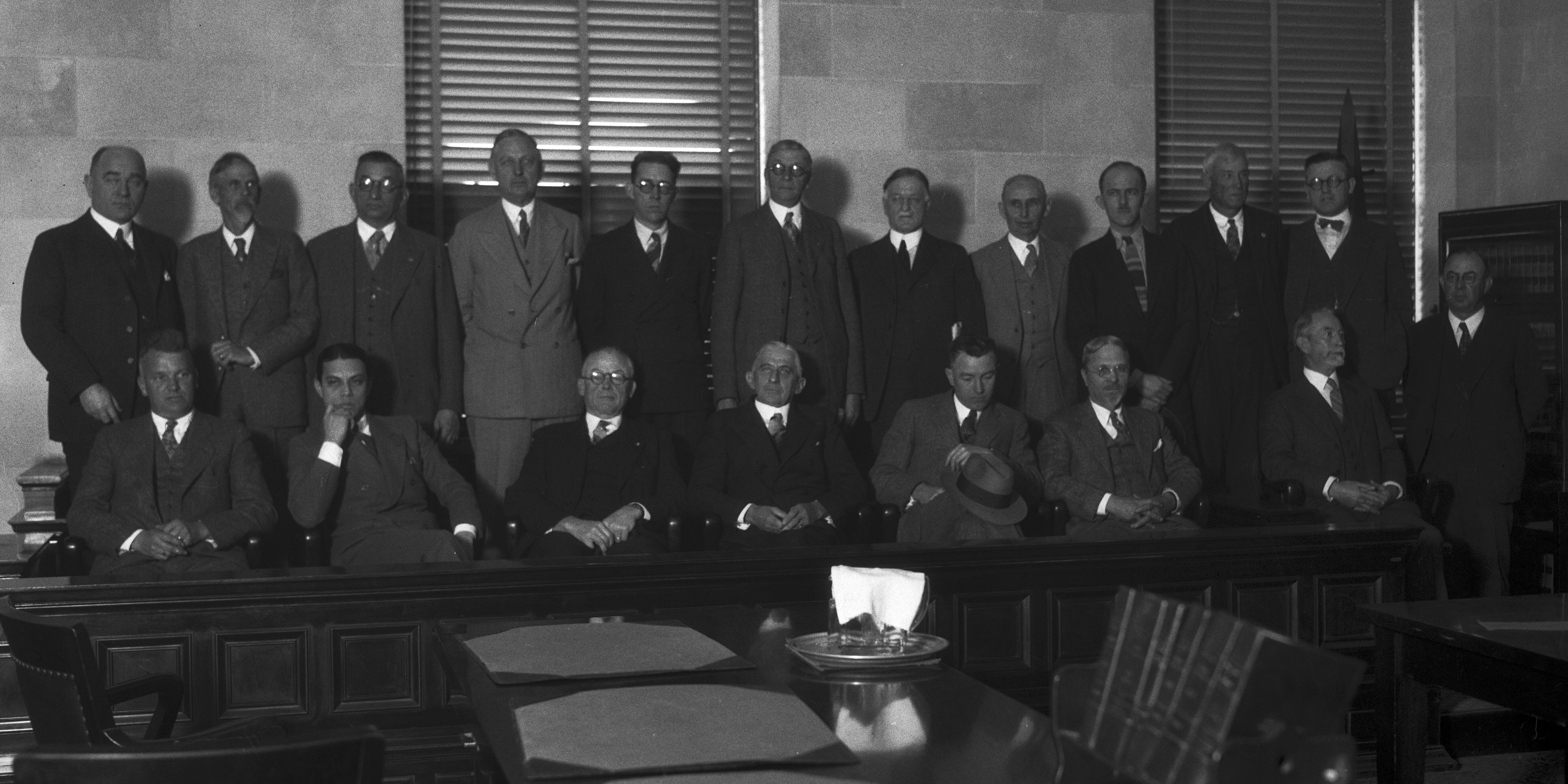
Cooke (sitting, second from right) in the 1928 county grand jury against Asa Keyes.

In 1907, due to his wife Nellie's asthma, the family moved to the city of Hollywood, California. There, Cooke managed several banks and served as a Captain in the Army Quartermaster Corps during World War I. He was also a member of the Hollywood Board of Trade, which later became the Chamber of Commerce when Hollywood joined Los Angeles. In 1927, Cooke traveled around the world with a film crew. The next year, he served as the chairman of the 1928 county grand jury, which accused Los Angeles County District Attorney Asa Keyes of "willful and corrupt misconduct" in office. The grand jury would indict Keyes for accepting a bribe from the Julian Petroleum Corporation, sentenced to five years' imprisonment, and removed from office.

In 1929, Cooke ran for the 2nd district of the Los Angeles City Council after incumbent Arthur Alber retired. He stressed the use of law enforcement in the city as well as the maintenance and development of the city's water, power, and harbor. He won the election in the primary and endorsed a $17,500,000 power bonds and $22,500,000 water bonds for the general election. In the council, he was appointed to the Water and Power Committee alongside Carl Ingold Jacobson and Thomas W. Williams. He ran for re-election in 1931 but was defeated by James M. Hyde.

== Personal life ==
Cooke married Nellie Elizabeth Ford in 1895, and they had two children, Edwin and Elizabeth. During his time on the City Council, Cooke and his family lived in a house at the foot of the Hollywood Hills. He died on May 14, 1941, at his home in Westwood. He was cremated at Hollywood Forever Cemetery.

== Electoral history ==
Electoral history of Thomas F. Cooke
Year	Office		Party	Primary			General			Result	Swing	Ref.
Year	Office		Party	Total	%	P.	Total	%	P.	Result	Swing	Ref.
1929	Los Angeles City Council	2nd	Nonpartisan	7,486	61.76%	1st	Runoff cancelled			Won	N/A	
1931	Los Angeles City Council	2nd	Nonpartisan	2,716	34.46%	1st	4,861	48.04%	2nd	Lost	N/A	

Preceded by Arthur Alber	Los Angeles City Council; 2nd District; 1927–29	Succeeded by James M. Hyde
