= Lemoine Blanchard =

American businessman and politician (1910–1986)

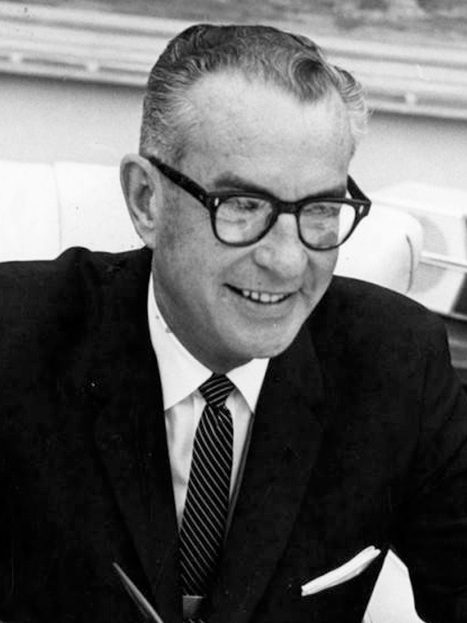
- Blanchard in 1963

Member of the Los Angeles City Council from the 2nd district
- In office July 1, 1959 – June 30, 1963
- Preceded by: Earle D. Baker
- Succeeded by: James B. Potter Jr.

Personal details
- Born: October 16, 1910 Longmont, Colorado, U.S.
- Died: August 13, 1986 (aged 75) Los Angeles, California, U.S.
- Party: Republican
- Spouse: Frances Blanchard (m. 1933)
- Children: 2

Charles Lemoine Blanchard (October 16, 1910 – August 13, 1986) was a businessman who was a member of the Los Angeles City Council from 1959 until 1963 and a board member of the national YMCA.

== Biography ==
Blanchard was born October 16, 1910, in Longmont, Colorado, the son of Roscoe Warren Blanchard Sr. and Loletta Blanchard. He was brought to the San Fernando Valley when he was a year old, was educated locally and, after graduating from high school, he joined his father's North Hollywood firm, Blanchard Lumber Company, of which he later became owner. He was a "lifelong supporter" of the East Valley YMCA and president of the North Hollywood Kiwanis and the Al Malaikah Shrine Temple. In 1967 he was named to the national board of the YMCA.

He died August 13, 1986, in North Hollywood. He was survived by his wife, Frances; two children, Carol Sanders and Ross Lemoine Blanchard; a brother, Roscoe W. Blanchard, Jr., and two sisters, Dorothy Camp and Maude Humm. Funeral services were held in the First Christian Church of North Hollywood.

== Public life ==
=== Los Angeles County ===
Blanchard was a member of the Los Angeles County Housing Authority for fifteen years until elected to the city council in 1959.

=== City Council ===
==== Elections ====
In the 1950s, Los Angeles City Council District 2 covered Hollywood and a "sizable portion" of the San Fernando Valley, generally west of Ventura Boulevard and extending north to Encino.

Blanchard ran for election there in 1959, and he ousted incumbent Earle D. Baker in the final vote. The next year, the 2nd District was divested of its Hollywood area, which was instead attached to the 13th District. Blanchard was defeated for reelection in 1963 by challenger James B. Potter, Jr.: Mayor Sam Yorty supported Potter and opposed Blanchard.

==== Highlights ====
Blanchard was described as an "arch-foe" of Mayor Sam Yorty. Some highlights of Blanchard's term on the City Council:

Zoo, 1959. He voted in favor of a contract with a nonprofit organization called Friends of the Zoo to operate a "Los Angeles world zoo" for fifty years, at the end of which time the Friends would turn it over to the city.

Monorail, 1962. Blanchard urged the city council to recognize "in principle" the concept of monorail to serve Los Angeles. He had just returned from a visit to Seattle, Washington, to inspect the Alweg Seattle Center Monorail system there. He suggested appointment of "an outstanding Los Angeles civic leader" to serve as a negotiator in the council's dealings with the Metropolitan Transit Authority.

Housing, 1962. He called on the council to oppose a state ballot proposition that would give the city Housing Authority permission to build homes for the aged and physically handicapped. He described it as "another scheme to establish state-financed public housing in California."

Control, 1962. He proposed a plan to eliminate citizens commissions that had control over municipal departments, thereby increasing the power of the city council at the expense of the mayor, who appointed the commission members.

=== Congress ===
Blanchard was the Republican candidate for the U.S. Congress in November 1960. He lost by a slight margin to fellow councilman James C. Corman, a Democrat, 48.9% to 51.1%.

=== Airport Commission ===
In an "anti-Yorty act," Blanchard was appointed to the Los Angeles Airport Commission by City Council President L.E. Timberlake. who was acting mayor while Mayor Yorty was out of town on a European trip. The council confirmed the appointment by a 9–6 vote, leaving the mayor "furious" and promising to stop the appointment on his return. The action, however, was ruled legal by City Attorney Roger Arnebergh.

Preceded by Earle D. Baker	Los Angeles City Council; 2nd District; 1959–63	Succeeded by James B. Potter, Jr.
