= Robert M. Allan =

American politician

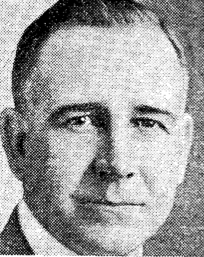
- Allan in 1925

Member of the Los Angeles City Council
- In office July 1, 1921 – June 30, 1927
- Preceded by: Multi-member district
- Succeeded by: Arthur Alber
- Constituency: At-large district (1921–1925); 2nd district (1925–1927)

Personal details
- Born: September 12, 1880 Saint John, New Brunswick, Canada
- Died: May 27, 1965 (aged 84) Glendale, California, U.S.
- Party: Republican
- Spouse: Helen M. Urenn (m. 1907)
- Children: 2

Robert M. Allan (September 12, 1880 – May 27, 1965) was a Canadian-born American politician. He was a member of the City Council in Los Angeles, California from 1921 to 1927.

== Biography ==
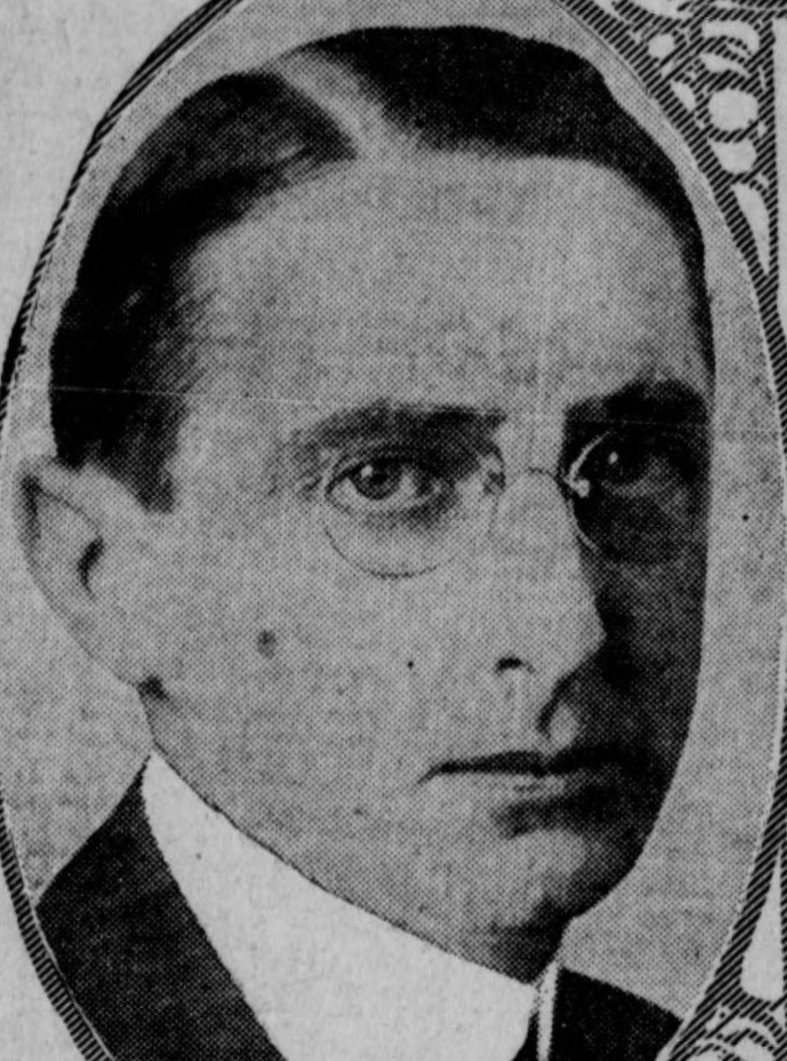
Allan in 1915 while campaigning for Mayor.

Born on September 12, 1880, in Saint John, New Brunswick, Canada, Allan was the son of Martin Smith Allan and Shara Neptune. He was educated in the public schools of Saint John until he was 18, when he emigrated to Boston, Massachusetts, United States, and finished his schooling there. He did "electrical experimental work" in Boston and moved to California in 1903, where he joined the Electrical Workers Union and worked with the Woodill-Hulse Electric Company and then with the Auto Vehicle Company. He began working in insurance and finance in 1905, then became president of the Guarantee Finance & Securities Company and vice-president of Insurance Plan Mutual Building and Loan. He later formed Allan MacMaster Company, of which he was senior partner.

Allan was married to Helen M. Urenn of Taylorville in 1907; they had two children, Robert M. Jr. and Lois. A Methodist and a Republican, Taylor was a member of the Jonathan, City, Breakfast, Casa Del Mar, Lakeside, El Caballero and San Pedro Golf clubs. His hobbies were golf and fishing.

After leaving the City Council, Allan returned to his private business interests.

== Public life ==
=== City Council ===
Allan was elected to the City Council in 1921 when the city used an at-large voting system and was reelected in 1923 under the same system. After the adoption of a new city charter in 1925, in which district voting was established, he was chosen as the first councilman from the city's 2nd District, which at that time covered Hollywood south of Franklin Avenue or Hollywood Boulevard and north of Santa Monica Boulevard, and including the Los Feliz district. He was reelected in 1925 but lost to Arthur Alber in 1927. It was said that Allan's loss that year was partly due to the voters' making a "clean sweep at the City Hall" of the council members allied with political boss Kent Kane Parrot.

=== Later service ===
Allan was appointed to the city's Board of Public Works in 1933, and he there joined the city's retirement system. Some controversy was aroused in September 1941, long after he had left the board, when he applied for a pension. He had been hired as a meat inspector on August 4, 1940, but he was discharged by the Board of Health Commissioners fifteen days later because, the board said in a resolution, it appeared that he had been employed "primarily, if not solely, for the purpose of enabling him to be in the employ of the city at a time when he should file an application for a pension." It was said he would collect "$61.39 per month for life" after having paid in just $686 to the fund. The city attorney was asked if Allan's claim were valid. No response was publicly revealed.

Preceded by District established	Los Angeles City Council; 2nd District; 1925–1927	Succeeded by Arthur Alber
