= James M. Hyde =

American metallurgist and politician (1873-1943)

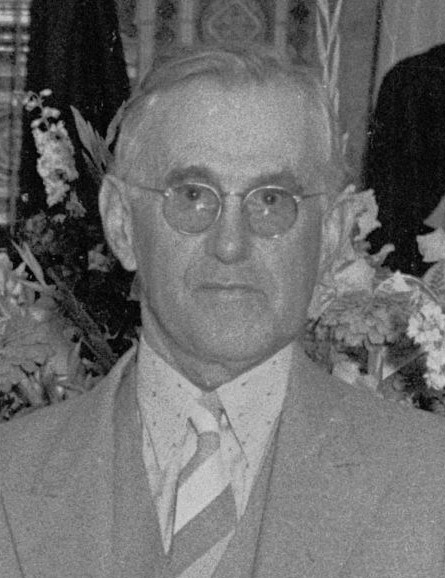
- Hyde in 1935

Member of the Los Angeles City Council from the 2nd District
- In office July 1, 1931 – June 30, 1939
- Preceded by: Thomas F. Cooke
- Succeeded by: Norris J. Nelson

Personal details
- Born: June 25, 1873 Mystic Bridge, Connecticut
- Died: July 18, 1943 (aged 70) Los Angeles, California
- Party: Republican
- Spouse: Bessie Lorraine Ransom (m. 1902)
- Children: 1

James McDonald Hyde (June 25, 1873 – July 18, 1943) was a metallurgist who designed the first significant froth flotation plant in the United States. He also served as a member of the Los Angeles, California, City Council from 1931 to 1939.

== Biography ==
James M. Hyde was born June 25, 1873, in Mystic Bridge, Connecticut, the son of Rev. William Penn Hyde and Seraphine Smith Carr. His mother was a Mayflower descendant. When he was age eight, his father moved the Hyde family of eight children to Santa Cruz, California, and, later, to Palo Alto, California. As the youngest son, not expected to enter the ministry, James studied mining engineering and geology at Stanford University. He was active in the school's geology club, engineers' club, and was an assistant instructor in assaying before graduating in 1901.

In 1903, he married Bessie Lorraine Ransom, born in California 1872. They had one daughter, Helen Elizabeth, born in California in 1908. After Hyde resigned from Stanford in 1927, he moved to Los Angeles.

He died July 18, 1943, in his home at 1300-3/4 North Sycamore Avenue in Hollywood.

== Early career ==
After graduation, Hyde went to work for the California State Mining Bureau as curator of its museum and as field engineer. This was followed with three years, 1903 -1906, as professor and head of the University of Oregon, Eugene's mining department where he helped found the new department. Offered a job in industry, he left the university in the fall of 1906, and spent the next three years during a mining boom that went bust with the Panic of 1907: he was metallurgist for a silver mill in Guanajuato, Mexico, 1906-1907; then an assayer for the Charles Butters & Company's cyanide plant at Virginia City, Nevada, 1907; then, 1907-1908, superintendent of a small stamp mill and attached cyanide plant at the short-lived gold rush town of Manhattan, Nevada; and then managed a gold prospect in the California Mother Lode country. He returned to education in 1909 as director of the San Diego public school system's new agriculture and horticulture program.

During this time, Hyde's reformer's zeal also manifested itself. At San Diego, he was a proponent of the City Beautiful movement; in Oregon he was president of the Good Roads Association in the state; and in Palo Alto he and brother William cheered on the Good Government League. An ongoing battle was with the California State Mining Bureau, which he resigned after making "charges of the most sensational character" against state Mineralogist Lewis E. Aubury over what was termed "Mismanagement, . . . public advertisement of private interests and a desire for personal aggrandizement." He also claimed the bureau was under the control of "the Octopus," the Southern Pacific Railroad and its minions. Aubrey countered that Hyde spent "too much time theorizing, with the result that nothing was getting accomplished in the museum" and was "a savant with his head swelled out of all proportion." When Hyde asked for a two-week vacation, Aubrey said, "I gave [him] a vacation and a long one at that." The state's board that governed the bureau met to discuss Hyde's claims and decided by unanimous vote, "That the matter . . . be ignored entirely." Hyde's reformer's zeal would arise throughout his life, often to his discredit. By 1910, according to Hyde, he was considering relocating to Mexico to aid in the government's planned education reforms, when the Mexican Revolution intervened. He instead took a job in London, which would bring him fame and notoriety.

== Flotation process ==
In 1989 Hyde was posthumously inducted into the National Mining Hall of Fame and Museum in Leadville, Colorado, as a result of his installation of the first froth flotation process in the United States. The museum states:

Without this process, there would be no mining industry as we know it today: virtually the entire world of copper, lead, zinc and silver is first collected in the froth of the flotation process. . . . Froth flotation has permitted the mining of low-grade and complex ores that otherwise would have been unprofitable, and thanks to James Hyde, many old "worthless" tailings dumps have been converted into profitable mines.

In January 1910, his Stanford classmate Theodore J. Hoover offered Hyde a job with the Minerals Separation, Limited, of which he was manager in the London Office. The firm had perfected an early froth flotation process in their labs and in the field, and introduced it with great financial success at the massive zinc-lead deposits of Broken Hill, Australia. Hyde accepted, moved to London, and was immersed in studying the revolutionary new process for working low grade ores. In what was a defining moment in his career, he left the company after a year to lead in the technology's transfer to America. He was following in the time honored tradition of technologists, who learned of new technology in England, and then stole all the information they could in order to introduce the technology to the United States, often over the cry of fraud and dishonor by the British owners of patents and the royalties they produced. (For an early example, see the life of Samuel Slater, builder of the first textile mill in America).

Early in 1911, Hyde left Minerals Separation, Ltd, to introduce the flotation process at a zinc mine in Butte, Montana, being considered for purchase by mining specialist Herbert Hoover, later the President of the United States, with the help of his brother Theodore J. Hoover, who had also left the London company. Although Hoover backed out of the purchase, Hyde was hired by the owners of the Butte and Superior Copper Company and built a successful, small test plant in 1911. In 1912, he designed and the company built the Butte & Superior works, Butte, Montana, the first great froth flotation mill in the United States. Some would claim that Hyde demonstrated great intuition and genius in his "Hyde process." The Minerals Separations, Ltd., company disagreed and declared an infringement of its flotation process patent and began a lawsuit that took five years and ended in the U. S. Supreme Court.

== Litigation ==
Hyde had designed "a unit with two sections, one of rougher cells and the other of cleaner cells. The rougher concentrate was cleaned in the cleaner cells and the cleaner tailings were returned to the rougher cells. This was the first time the "rougher-cleaner circuit" was employed and the procedure has never been disputed. He was awarded a patent on the process in 1911."

Unfortunately for Hyde, at issue in the court's eyes was not how a box was shaped or a cell was devised but about the "process" of introducing air and limited amounts of oil to make the metals in the finely ground ore "float."

Hyde lost his case in 1913, but a court of appeals decided in his favor in 1914, only to have the Supreme Court hold, in December 1916, that he had infringed on the Minerals Separation patent. In general, the American press and mining industry favored a decision for Hyde over the British patent holders. Mining engineer Daniel C. Jackling, who had purchased the Butte & Superior, funded Hyde's lawsuits while contesting the Minerals Separation company patents at the Jackling group of mines in Utah, Nevada, Arizona, and New Mexico, which introduced their own modified Hyde flotation process—and were sued by Minerals Separation as well. Thomas Arthur Rickard, editor of the Mining & Scientific Press, San Francisco, made Hyde's suit, and the others that followed against Minerals Separation, into a cause celeb, where the firm was described as evil incarnate. Hyde received professional accolades, probably the greatest being during the many talks on flotation, recognizing his primacy, presented at the American Institute of Mining Engineer's conference in Arizona, September 1916. But in the end the Minerals Separation, Ltd would prevail in its many suits until its patent expired in 1923, "and in so doing earned for itself the cordial detestation of many in the mining world."

== Consultancy ==
During the period between his 1914 court victory and the Supreme Court's negative decision, Hyde's consultant business flourished with work primarily undertaken by him in the silver-lead-zinc mines of Colorado, with a test lab in Denver and in southern Colorado. In 1916-1917, his biggest personal financial failure was on the lease of the Genesee-Vanderbilt group of mines above Silverton, Colorado, and the construction of a flotation mill that failed because of complex ores. (The Butte & Superior ores had been simpler in their composition, fortunate for Hyde's first, 1911-1912, success). Over the next decade, other metallurgists and chemists would solve the problems with new differential flotation, addition of xanthates and other reagents, and additional steps to a continually evolving process that would take more technical skill while exceeding everyone's expectations of utility. By 1917, Hyde had relocated back to Palo Alto and was hired as a consulting metallurgist for the U. S. Bureau of Mines experiment station at Stanford.

In 1919, Stanford hired Hyde and his old friend Theodore J. Hoover as faculty in the mining department. Over the next seven years he would teach metallurgy, work in his metallurgical lab, and do a limited consulting business with the Hoover brothers. More and more, his interests leaned to reform and political activities. In 1927, he resigned from Stanford to, officially, return to his consultant work in Mexico and Southern California, but, unofficially, to become more active in Republican politics. As before, some of his mining ventures were suspect, including an attempt in 1935 to reopen the Good Hope Mine in Riverside County. A state inquiry was held in 1935 on the financing of this mine. But by then, his name had secured its place in the mining history books.

== Politics ==
=== Federal ===
By March 1920, Hyde was active in Republican politics, working as an engineer for Herbert Hoover, who was being mentioned as a candidate for president. Concerning Hoover's campaign intentions, Hyde was "believed by political observers to speak with more authority than any other San Franciscan."

In 1925 Hyde became a candidate himself—for the Republican nomination for the U.S. Senate, but Republican Senator Samuel M. Shortridge was renominated and reelected the next year.

=== Los Angeles ===
Hyde, who in 1929 was living at 1954 Argyle Avenue, Hollywood, was appointed to the Los Angeles Board of Public Works by Mayor John C. Porter, serving until 1930, when he had a disagreement with Porter and "resigned to develop a mine."

==== Elections ====
In 1931, Hyde ousted incumbent Councilman Thomas F. Cooke from his 2nd District seat and was reelected every two years until the election of 1939, when he was defeated by Norris J. Nelson. In that year Hyde was said to be the victim of a "purge" of the City Council directed by Mayor Fletcher Bowron.

==== Controversies ====
1931 Hyde voted against instructing the city attorney to appeal a judge's decision ordering the city to stop the practice of segregating its swimming pools by race, a decision that was put into effect in summer 1931. The vote was 6 in favor of an appeal and 8 opposed, including Hyde, a decision that resulted in the pools being immediately desegregated.

1932 In an open letter, he attacked the Rev. Martin Luther Thomas, chief investigator for City Prosecutor Johnson, claiming Thomas was engaged in a "racket " of soliciting money, to be sent to the City Hall. Hyde claimed that "highly profitable gambling, bootlegging, etc.," were thriving openly under Mayor John C. Porter.

1933 He introduced a resolution asking for a State Senate inquiry into vice conditions in Los Angeles, claiming that intimate relations existed among "criminals, peace officers, law-enforcement agencies and unscrupulous politicians" and demanding investigation by an outside agency.

1934 Hyde also introduced a resolution that would have put the council on record in opposition to public assistance to the unemployed in favor of a plan that would have governmental agencies help in granting credit to "those who can create employment for themselves and others." He said prosperity depended on individual initiative, not "artificially created public works."

1935 Turning his back on the Republican Party, he worked for the election of Upton Sinclair's End Poverty in California team on the grounds that Sinclair's proposals were more conservative than those of Governor Frank Merriam.

1935 Hyde was accused of asking "patent paving" contractors and others to invest in his Good Hope Mine venture, but he said he always kept his private business separate from his City Council activities.

1936 Hyde and Councilman Parley Parker Christensen were able to block the allocation of $2,000 to deliver to Berlin, Germany, the flag that had flown over the 1932 Olympics in Los Angeles. The two council members "assailed Hitler and Nazism and said their constituents did not want the city to spend public money" to send the Games flag to Germany.

1938 Hyde charged that the telephone in his office had been tapped, probably by the Police Department, and he asked for a grand jury investigation. According to a subsequent letter from Mayor Frank L. Shaw, a City Hall investigation found that "Councilman Hyde's telephone has not been tapped [and] could not conceivably have been tapped," and Shaw charged Hyde with "behavior unbecoming an official of this city."

1938 The councilman was named chairman of a five-man City Council committee that was authorized to investigate the police department.

Preceded by Thomas F. Cooke	Los Angeles City Council; 2nd District; 1929–39	Succeeded by Norris J. Nelson
