= Center Grove, Iowa =

Coordinates: 42°29′28″N 90°42′55″W

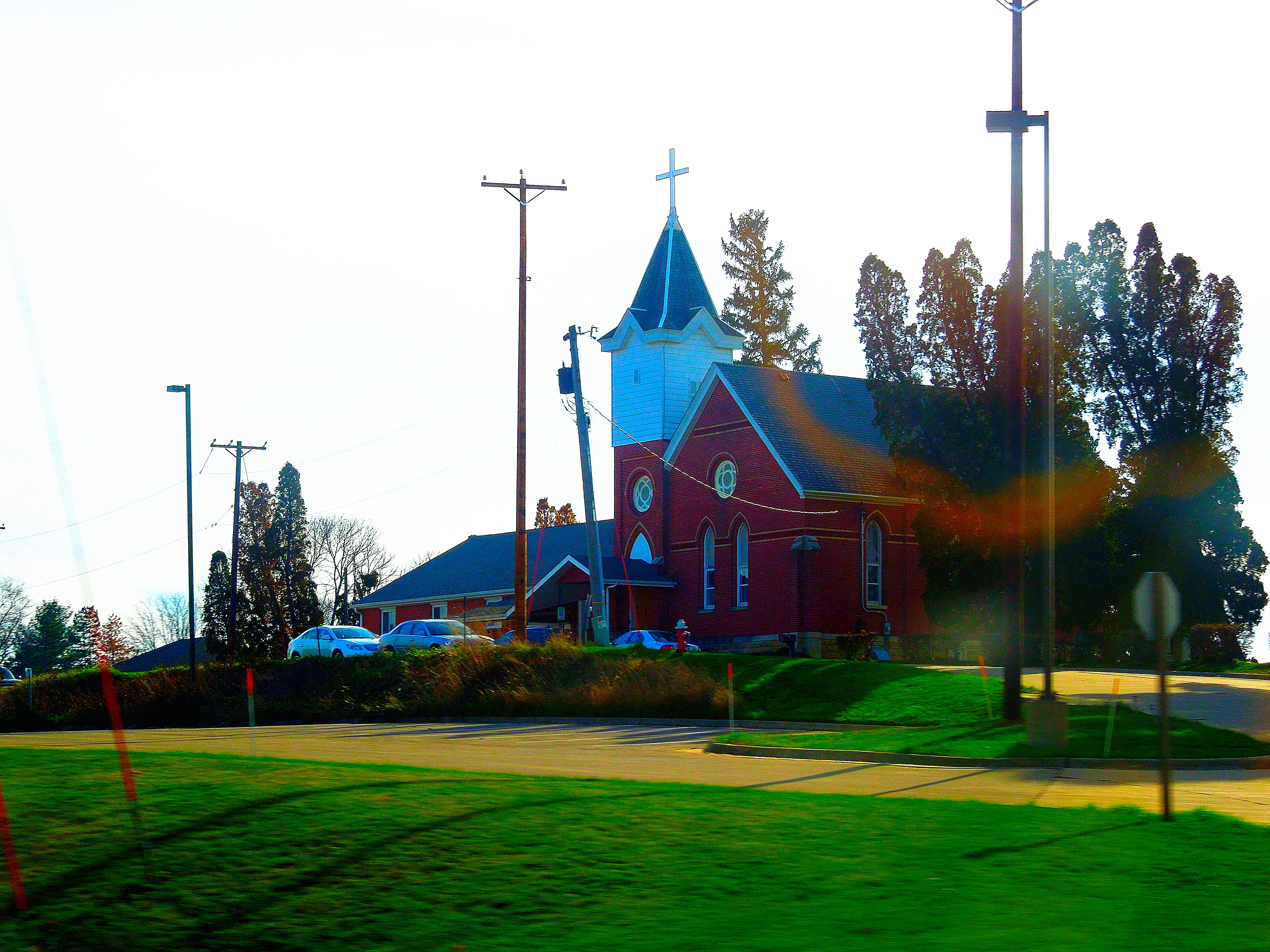
Center Grove United Methodist Church

Center Grove, Iowa was a town located just to the west of Dubuque, Iowa. It is located in section 27 of Dubuque Township. It is named Center as it was believed to be the center of the mining district. Center Grove was located near what today is known as U.S. Highway 20 and Devon Drive.

== History ==
The community traced its history back to 1833, when the Jesse Yount family first arrived in the area. He and his family were later followed by William Daykin and his family. William and his brother John set up a small general store, which they owned for a number of years. When a post office was established in Center Grove in 1877, William's son Metcalf was appointed postmaster, this post office served the area until 1900, when rural free delivery was established.

At first the residents of Center Grove, many of whom were Methodists, traveled to Rockdale to attend worship services there. In 1852 the residents built their own church, which they named Center Grove Methodist Church. The congregation eventually outgrew this building, so in 1886 the present church building was constructed.

During the first part of the 20th century, Edward G. Bartels established several business ventures in Center Grove. When the Hawkeye Highway - which would become U.S. Highway 20 - was built Bartels opened a ballroom next to the highway, which was called the Crystal Ballroom. The Crystal Ballroom was a popular gathering place which drew bands from Chicago and the eastern United States from the 1920s through the 1940s'. Bartels also built a number of cabins to provide travelers with a place to stay in the Center Grove area as well, the number of cabins eventually reached 31.

The population was 80 in 1940.

Center Grove as an independent community ceased to exist in 1973, when it was annexed by the city of Dubuque. The Crystal Ballroom and Bartels Cabin Camp are no longer present in what was Center Grove, however the Center Grove United Methodist Church is still active. Highway 20 was expanded to four lanes, and a number of new businesses have opened in the area.

== Notable natives ==
- Thomas F. Cooke, Los Angeles, California, City Council member
