= Lloyd G. Davies =

American politician

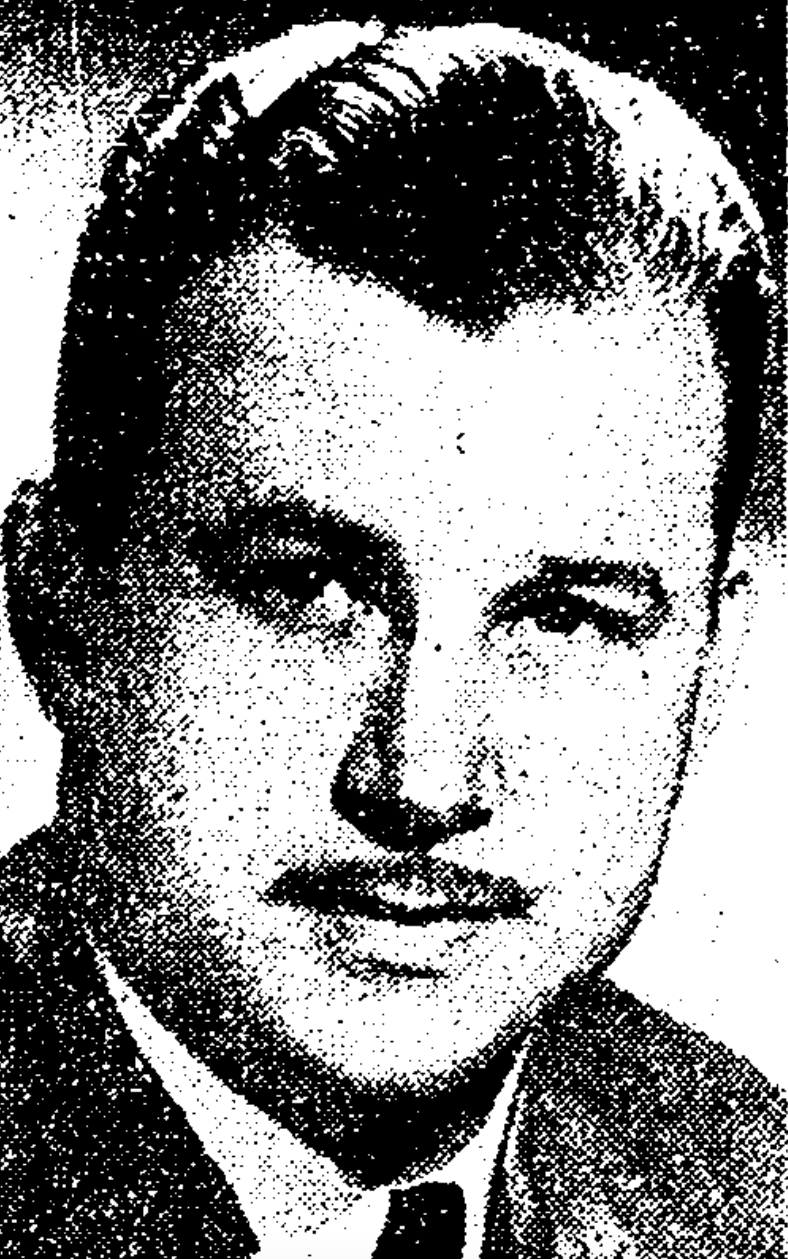

Member of the Los Angeles City Council from the 2nd district
- In office July 1, 1943 – June 30, 1951
- Preceded by: Norris J. Nelson
- Succeeded by: Earle D. Baker

Personal details
- Born: June 14, 1915
- Died: September 26, 1957 (aged 42)

Lloyd G. Davies (July 14, 1914 – September 26, 1957) was an American advertising and public relations man and sometime actor who was a Los Angeles City Council member from 1943 to 1951.

== Life and career ==
Davies was born in Los Angeles on July 14, 1914, and was graduated from Canoga Park High School. He took courses in civil law and civil engineering while working at the Los Angeles Department of Water and Power. He also worked with the city's Right of Way and Land Department in the Owens Valley. He left city employment in 1940 and became involved in the advertising business for two years and was also a public relations representative with the Merchants and Manufacturers Association. He invested in a small tool business and a cattle ranch. He was a member of the Hollywood Chamber of Commerce, the Auxiliary Sheriff's Posse, United Commercial Travelers, Native Sons of the Golden West and the Lions Club. He lived at 1718 North Sierra Bonita Avenue, Hollywood while he was a councilman.

A questionnaire he submitted for the Los Angeles Public Library files noted that he was an "enthusiast of hunting and fishing, . . . tennis, swimming, golf, football." He said he was an amateur boxer in the heavyweight class and qualified for the 1932 Summer Olympics in Los Angeles by winning a semifinal tournament but he did not compete in the Games themselves. He was also a motion picture actor: He was the narrator in The Red Menace film of 1949.

Davies was involved in a traffic incident in July 1950 when a pedestrian ran in front of the councilman's car and was killed. Davies was not at fault.

He died in a Ventura County hospital on September 26, 1957, after being hospitalized for three years. Death was attributed to bronchial pneumonia. His survivors were his ex-wife, Mary Davies; his mother, Margaret L. Davies; three children, Patricia Mary Grissom, Lloyd Jr. and Joanne Bronwyn, and a sister, Martha Wernett. Graveside services were at Oakwood Cemetery, Chatsworth.

== City council ==
=== Elections ===
Davies was easily elected in the primary vote in 1943 when he ran for the open seat in Los Angeles City Council District 2, vacated after Norris J. Nelson joined the Army. He also coasted to victory in the primary elections of 1945 through 1947, but "Recurring illness often forced his absence from Council meetings during his fourth term. He was defeated for reelection in 1951 by Earle D. Baker after opponents pointed to Davies' attendance record."

=== Positions ===
Davies was known as a conservative during his time on the City Council, "instrumental in securing legislation stopping commercial gravel operations in the Hollywood Hills and cleaning up undesirable cocktail bars in the Hollywood area." These are some of the positions he took:

Milk, 1941. Davies "hastily formed" a Milk Service League to fight a proposal prohibiting home milk delivery between 6 a.m. and 6 p.m. daily. "He denounced the move as a scheme on the part of A.F.L. Teamsters' Union officials to further their dues-collecting hold on home milk deliverymen." He said that "many milk consumers would not be at home to put it [milk] in the refrigerator."

Coliseum, 1944. He unsuccessfully urged that the city buy out the interests of Los Angeles County and the 6th Agricultural District in the Los Angeles Memorial Coliseum so that the municipality would be the "sole owner and have sole jurisdiction."

Development, 1949. Davies urged that the city buy the land encircling Barnsdall Park to prevent any "honky-tonk" development." He said the property, because of heavy brush, had "long been a hideout" for what he called "degenerates."

Freeway rail, 1949. He called upon the city to appropriate enough money to ensure that rail transportation could be included on the Santa Monica Freeway, then being built.

Wiretap, 1949. "Activities of the Police Department in installing mechanical eavesdropping devices in the home of [gangster] Mickey Cohen caused consternation and criticism in the City Council," with Davies asking, "how many other places may have received the same treatment? Could it be that possibly even the homes of a few Councilmen were not neglected?" He said the police "had a lot of explaining to do."

Political offices
Preceded by Norris J. Nelson	Los Angeles City Council; 2nd District; 1943–51	Succeeded by Earle D. Baker
