= Arthur Alber =

American politician (1892–1964)

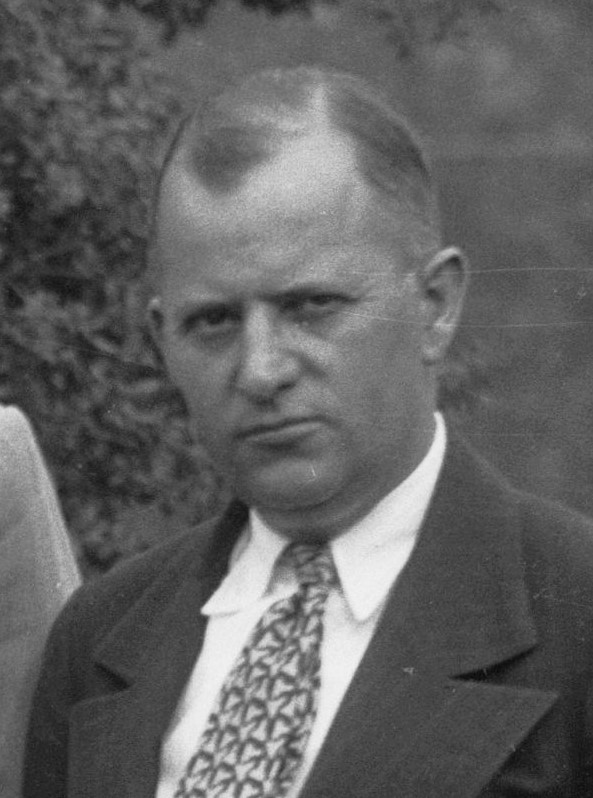
- Alber in 1929

Member of the Los Angeles City Council from the 2nd District
- In office July 1, 1927 – June 30, 1929
- Preceded by: Robert M. Allan
- Succeeded by: Thomas F. Cooke

Personal details
- Born: September 16, 1892 Birmingham, Alabama
- Died: December 13, 1964 (aged 72) Los Angeles, California
- Party: Republican
- Spouse: Elise Alber

Military service
- Allegiance: United States
- Branch/service: United States Army
- Battles/wars: World War I

Arthur Alber (September 16, 1892 – December 13, 1964) was an attorney and a member of the Los Angeles, California, City Council from 1927 to 1929.

Elected to the Los Angeles City Council District 2 in the May 1927 primary election, Alber is known for introducing a resolution to prohibit the rolling down of men's bathing suit shirts, and opposing a resolution permitting the city of Hawthorne to petition for consolidation with the city of Los Angeles.

== Biography ==
Alber was born September 16, 1892, in Birmingham, Alabama. His parents were Hermann Alber, a native of Germany, and Mary Wing of Cape Cod, Massachusetts. He attended the local public schools until he was fifteen when he moved with his family to Los Angeles, where he enrolled in Hollywood High School. In 1910, he took the role of Shady in a student production of the operetta Pauline, and during his high school years he played football, tennis, and baseball; he was baseball team captain. He graduated in June 1912 and returned for Alumni Visitors Day in January 1913, when he gave a talk on Civil War Confederate General Robert E. Lee. Between 1914 and 1918 he attended the University of Southern California, where he earned letters in baseball and tennis.

Sources differ as to his World War I service. A report from a telephone interview with a Works Progress Administration writer in 1937 noted that he "served in the Army at Vancouver, Washington, where he attended officers training school," but a 1926 article in the Los Angeles Times said: "Due to injuries resulting from an accident, Mr. Alber was unable to see active service with the army or navy during the World War, but served as a sergeant in the spruce woods." Another 1926 story said he was discharged from the Army in March 1919 and that he was on the stadium committee of the Hollywood American Legion post.

Alber earned a law degree from the University of Southern California and was admitted to the California State Bar on March 1, 1919. He was unmarried as of 1937. Alber was a Presbyterian, a Republican and a member of the Hollywood Athletic, Los Angeles Athletic, Lakeside Golf and Westport Beach clubs, as well as being a Kiwanian. He died on December 13, 1964.

== Political life ==
Alber was a candidate in 1926 for the 63rd Assembly District seat being vacated by Sidney T. Graves. Alber had the Times endorsement but came in second to Clare Woolwine. The other candidates were Ernest E. Noon and Voltaire Perkins.

Alber was elected to the Los Angeles City Council District 2 in the May 1927 primary election, ousting six-year incumbent Robert M. Allan by a vote of 4,980 to 2,399. It was said that Alber's victory was partly due to the voters' making a "clean sweep at the City Hall" of the council members allied with the political boss Kent Kane Parrot. In his council activity, he was known for introducing a resolution in July 1929 that would have prohibited the rolling down of the shirts of men's bathing suits to the waistline. Only he voted in favor, all the other councilmen being opposed. He was also the lone holdout against a resolution that gave the city of Hawthorne permission to circulate a petition asking for consolidation with the city of Los Angeles, stating that L.A. "should not adopt children until it knows that it can provide for them." For the Christmas season, 1927, Alber presided over a council meeting wearing a silk hat from Paris, presented to him by Councilman Isaac F. Hughes. Alber did not run for reelection in 1929 but returned to private law practice.

Political offices
Preceded by Robert M. Allan	Los Angeles City Council; 2nd District; 1927–29	Succeeded by Thomas F. Cooke
