= James B. Potter Jr. =

American politician

James Potter
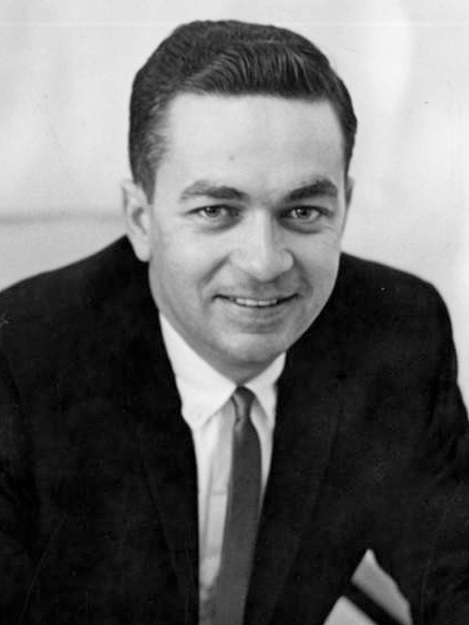
- Potter in 1963

Member of the Los Angeles City Council from the 2nd district
- In office 1963–1971
- Preceded by: C. Lemoine Blanchard
- Succeeded by: Joel Wachs

Personal details
- Born: October 21, 1931 (age 94) Humansville, Missouri, U.S.
- Spouse: Norma McKevett Teague (m. 1952; died 1987)
- Relations: Charles M. Teague (father-in-law)
- Children: 3
- Education: University of Missouri (BS); Wichita University

Military service
- Branch/service: United States Air Force
- Battles/wars: Korean War

James Burnie Potter Jr. (born October 21, 1931) was a member of the Los Angeles City Council from 1963 to 1971. A sales manager for a tool company, when elected to the City Council he became its youngest member at age 31. He was defeated in 1971 amid controversy over development of a housing tract in the Santa Monica Mountains.

== Early life and education ==
Potter was born on October 21, 1931, in Humansville, Missouri. He was raised in Buffalo, Missouri, where he was high school senior class president and also president of the student council. He attended Central Missouri State College on a basketball scholarship before enlisting in the United States Air Force. Potter served in the Korean War between 1952 and 1956, becoming a staff sergeant. He earned a Bachelor of Science degree in industrial relations and personnel management from the University of Missouri in 1958.

== Early career ==
Potter worked as a sales manager for Shearcut Tool Company of Encino, when he ran for the City Council in 1963, and in 1966 he was a director in the Surety National Bank of the same San Fernando Valley community. He was also a partner at James Associates.

== Los Angeles City Council ==
=== Elections ===
In the 1970s, Los Angeles City Council District 2 covered parts of the Santa Monica Mountains and extended into Sherman Oaks and Studio City. It ranged from Universal City on the east to roughly the San Diego Freeway on the west. In 1971 it had "the highest educational and economic level of the 15 council districts. The residents, mostly white, range[d] from Mayor Sam Yorty to rich theatrical folk in the mountains to blue collar workers in the flatlands."

Potter was a candidate against C. Lemoine Blanchard in the 2nd District race in 1963 and beat him in the final vote. Potter said later that Blanchard's claim to be "running against Sam Yorty" instead of against Potter "was a vital factor in the election result." When Potter was seated in July 1963, he became the City Council's youngest member at age 31, replacing Rosalind Wiener Wyman, who was 32 that year.

Early in 1971, Potter appeared headed for a clash with Mayor Sam Yorty when fourteen candidates entered the race; Potter claimed that Yorty had "loaded" the field with candidates. Yorty denied the charge, but "Because of Beverly Ridge (below) and a lot of other things, they think he's vulnerable," the mayor said. Yorty later endorsed Potter over opponent Joel Wachs because the mayor was not satisfied with Wachs' less-than-equivocal response to the question of whether the city should pay for the defense of police officers accused of civil-rights violations.

Potter lost in the final election to Wachs, 27,704 to 14,898.

=== Bribe attempt ===
Two men were found guilty in 1969 of offering a $6,000 bribe to Potter to obtain his support for a zone change to allow a Russian Orthodox Church to be constructed in a Sherman Oaks area restricted to residential use.

=== Beverly Ridge ===
In 1969, the attorney general of California petitioned a court to obtain the bank records concerning Potter, his sister, and a field deputy in a dispute involving the construction of a 300-acre subdivision and golf course called Beverly Ridge in the Santa Monica Mountains north of Beverly Hills. The attorney-general was probing "possible conflict of interest, malfeasance and bribery . . . including city councilmen and city commissioners."

The investigation has involved a $9.7 million plan to realign Beverly Drive from Beverly Hills [north] to Studio City—a project that would benefit the Beverly Ridge Estates development. . . . At first, the developer was required to build the road but later the city decided to convert it to a secondary highway and to finance it from gas tax revemies. The project has produced vigorous opposition. Both Beverly Hills and hillside residents charge public construction of the road would be an improper use of funds.

Potter's sister had been employed by the developer, Beverly Ridge Estates, and he cast votes in favor of the project. The project was reduced in size by 1980 and had its name changed to Beverly Park Estates.

=== Laurel Canyon ===
He and Council Member Robert J. Stevenson took the lead in successfully opposing a proposed freeway (State Route 160) through Laurel Canyon that would have linked Slauson Avenue in Ladera Heights with the San Fernando Valley. They said the idea was a "scheme to bury huge areas of Hollywood, the mountains and Studio City under a blanket of concrete."

=== Financial disclosure ===
Opposing a proposed financial disclosure law being considered by the City Council in 1970, Potter said he might have to resign from the council if it were passed because he had agreed never to disclose his wife's assets. He suggested that newspaper and radio stations receiving city tax exemptions should also be included in the ordinance to prevent "distortions" in "articles, editorials and news."

=== Police defense ===
In his 1971 election campaign, he recalled how he had "led the council fight for the city to pay for the defense of policemen indicted by the federal government in the 'mistake' shooting of Mexican nationals."

== Personal life ==
Potter married Norma Teague, the daughter of Congressman Charles M. Teague, in 1952, and they had three children. They lived in North Hollywood before moving to Studio City.

Preceded by C. Lemoine Blanchard	Los Angeles City Council; 2nd District; 1963–71	Succeeded by Joel Wachs
