= The Red Menace (film) =

1949 film by R. G. Springsteen

- Directed by: R. G. Springsteen
- Screenplay by: Albert DeMond; Gerald Geraghty
- Story by: Albert DeMond
- Starring: Robert Rockwell; Hannelore Axman
- Narrated by: Lloyd G. Davies
- Cinematography: John MacBurnie
- Edited by: Harry Keller
- Music by: Nathan Scortt
- Production company: Republic Pictures
- Distributed by: Republic Pictures
- Release date: June 9, 1949 (Los Angeles)
- Running time: 87 minutes
- Country: United States
- Language: English

The Red Menace (reissue title Underground Spy) is a 1949 anti-communist film noir drama film directed by R. G. Springsteen starring Robert Rockwell and Hannelore Axman.

== Plot ==
An ex-GI named Bill Jones (Robert Rockwell) becomes involved with the Communist Party USA. While in training, Jones falls in love with one of his instructors. At first true followers of communism, they realize their mistake when they witness party leaders murder a member who questions the party's principles. When they try to leave the party, the two are marked for murder and hunted by the party's assassins.

== Cast ==
- Robert Rockwell as Bill Jones
- Hannelore Axman as Nina Petrovka (credited as Hanne Axman)
- Betty Lou Gerson as Yvonne Kraus
- Barbra Fuller as Mollie O'Flaherty
- Shepard Menken as Henry Solomon
- Lester Luther as Earl Partridge
- William Lally as Jack Tyler (credited as William J. Lally)
- Lloyd G. Davies as Inspector O'Toole
- Norman Budd as Reachi
- Leo Cleary as Father O'Leary
- Kay Riehl as Mrs. O'Flaherty
- William Martell as Immigration Insp. Riggs
- James Harrington as Martin Vejac
- Duke Williams as Sam Wright
- Napoleon Simpson as Tom Wright
- Robert H. Purcell as Sheriff of Talbot (credited as Roberto Purcell)
- Royal Raymond as Benson
- Gregg Martell as Schuitz
- Jimmy Hawkins as Jimmy (credited as Jimmie Hawkins)

== Production ==
The film was originally planned to be made by Irving Allen and James S. Burkett as an independent film. Republic Pictures chose unknowns for the cast and many made their film debuts. Republic Pictures' president Herbert Yates was named as executive producer but no producer was named.

As well as playing Inspector O'Toole, Lloyd G. Davies was also the film's narrator.

== Release ==
The film opened in the Los Angeles district on June 9, 1949. In two theaters in Los Angeles it grossed a dull $22,000 in its first week. The film performed poorly at the box office and was withdrawn from release after several months. The film was re-edited and re-released in 1953 as Underground Spy.

== See also ==
- List of American films of 1949
