= Norris J. Nelson =

American politician (1905–1995)

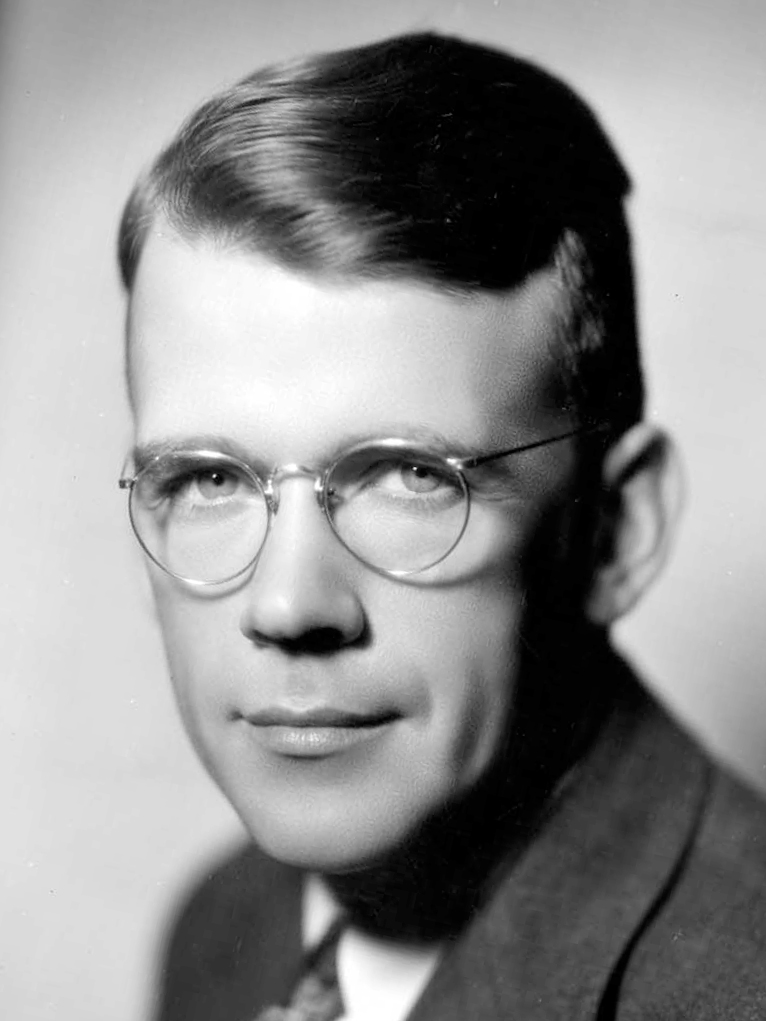
- Nelson in 1940

Member of the Los Angeles City Council from the 2nd District
- In office July 1, 1939 – June 30, 1943
- Preceded by: James M. Hyde
- Succeeded by: Lloyd G. Davies

Personal details
- Born: January 31, 1905 Bayfield, Wisconsin
- Died: April 3, 1995 (aged 90) Maricopa, Arizona
- Party: Republican
- Spouse: Florence Ely (m. 1964)
- Children: 1
- Profession: Politician

Military service
- Allegiance: United States
- Branch/service: United States Army
- Battles/wars: World War II

Norris Jerome Nelson (January 31, 1905 – April 3, 1995) was an American politician who served as a member of the Los Angeles City Council from 1939 to 1943.

== Biography ==
Nelson, the son of Chris Nelson of Norway and Regina Nelson of Minnesota, was born on January 31, 1905, in Bayfield, Wisconsin. He was married on October 2 or 22, 1922, to Adele M. or Edel Marie Nicolaysen of Wisconsin. They had one child, Norris Jerome Jr. The elder Nelson was sued for divorce in 1941, but a reconcilement was effected in 1942, the same year that Nelson joined the Army. He attended a Civil Affairs Training School at Yale and saw service in Scotland and Norway. "His last duty was the disposition of approximately 100,000 persons sent by the Germans into Norway as slave labor."

The Nelsons finally separated in April 1946, and a divorce trial opened in September 1948. Norwegian actress Asta Bertels was mentioned in the testimony, Nelson relating that he brought her from Norway the same month, April 1946, that he separated from his wife and that he was acting as her agent in furthering a Hollywood career; she signed a contract with showgirl impresario Earl Carroll. Superior Judge William J. Palmer granted the divorce to Mrs. Nelson, calling the broken marriage "a wartime casualty."

Nelson moved to California in 1926. His residence address was 6306 Ivarene, Hollywood. He was a Presbyterian and a Republican. He died on April 3, 1995, in Maricopa, Arizona.

== City Council ==
=== Elections ===
Nelson ran for the Los Angeles City Council District 2 seat in 1937 against the incumbent, James M. Hyde, and was defeated in a close vote, 9,161 to 8,981. In 1939, though, he defeated Hyde easily in the primary election, with no run-off needed, 9,632 to 4,287. In that year Hyde was said to be the victim of a "purge" of the City Council directed by Mayor Fletcher Bowron. He was reelected in 1941 but decided against running again in 1943 in favor of joining the armed forces.

=== Controversies ===
Government. Nelson joined Council Member Arthur E. Briggs in 1939 in proposing a combined city-county government with a borough system for Los Angeles.

Mayor. He was appointed to a committee of five council members in May 1940 to call on Mayor Fletcher Bowron to complain about "persistent and erroneous" remarks the mayor made about the council in his radio addresses.

Dogs. In 1941 Nelson proposed a law stating that dog owners "must not allow their pets to commit nuisances upon sidewalks, lawns, in public buildings, conveyances, apartment houses, beaches, and the like." He said letters had "poured into his office favoring the measure by a ratio of 50 to 1." Later he said he had received some "vicious" letters, threatening that dog owners would band together and defeat him in the next election.

Strike. He submitted a proposal that would make it unlawful "for any person by the use of force or violence or threat of violence, to prevent or to attempt to prevent any person from engaging in any lawful vocation within this city." Regarding the then-current strike against North American Aviation (1941), he said:

We know how these agitators will act. The Army will guard the plant all right, but how about the homes, the wives and the children of the workmen? I tell you, these men who wish to work are scared stiff. If they go back to work they will be in deadly peril of their lives and their futures. They know these agitators will go to their homes and beat them up and threaten them. ... We should take this action to stiffen their morale. ...

Elections. Also in 1941, he proposed a new voting system that he said would take the "hate" out of city elections because it would do away with the necessity for a primary election followed by a final vote, which he said simply lengthened the period of virulent campaigning..

Under its provisions, there would be selection of the two candidates with the highest first-vote choices. The second-choice votes would then be tabulated and the candidate with the most combined first and second-choice votes would be elected.

Clothing. Nelson advocated an ordinance that would outlaw the wearing of zoot suits within the city on the grounds that the high-waisted, wide-legged, tight-cuffed, pegged trousers favored by young Hispanic men in 1943 had become a "public nuisance."

Preceded by James M. Hyde	Los Angeles City Council; 2nd District; 1939–43	Succeeded by Lloyd G. Davies
