= Earle D. Baker =

American politician

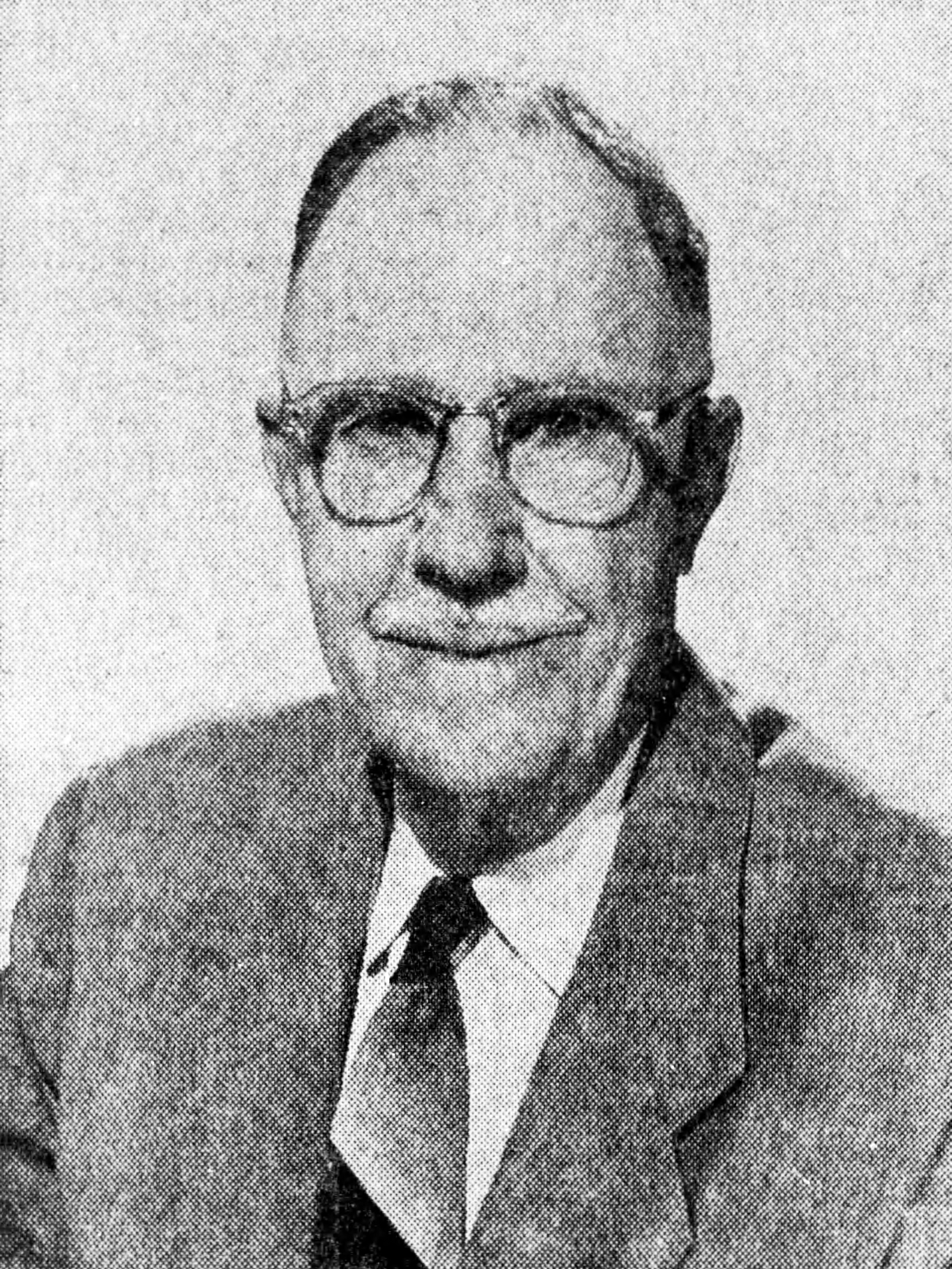
- Baker in 1969

Member of the Los Angeles City Council from the 2nd district
- In office July 1, 1951 – June 30, 1959
- Preceded by: Lloyd G. Davies
- Succeeded by: Lemoine Blanchard

Member of the Los Angeles Board of Education
- In office July 1, 1949 – June 28, 1951

Personal details
- Born: September 28, 1887 Iantha, Missouri
- Died: July 15, 1969 (aged 81) Laguna Beach, California
- Party: Republican
- Spouse: Edna I. Harrison (m. 1912)

Earle Delosse Baker (September 28, 1887 – July 15, 1969) was a prominent Hollywood food broker who was a member of the Los Angeles City Board of Education from 1949 to 1951 and of the Los Angeles City Council from 1951 until 1959.

== Biography ==
Baker was born on September 28, 1887, in Iantha, Missouri, the son of William Calvin Baker of Ohio and Laura Laidlaw Baker of Canada. He was brought to California in 1901 and attended San Francisco public schools as well as the University of California, Berkeley. He was married to Edna I. Harrison of Kansas City, Kansas, on September 4, 1912. They had two children, Calvin Harrison Baker and Adele Baker Hart, and lived at 6818 Odin Street, at 2200 Fairfield Avenue, and at 2017 Holly Hill Terrace, all in the Hollywood Hills.

One of his first positions was that of secretary to the San Fernando Fruit Exchange. In 1930 he began a food brokerage business, Baker Brokerage Company, later known as Baker-Bishop-King, Inc. He retired in 1947, but after his council service ended in 1959 he worked for a savings and loan association. He was a Methodist and a Republican.

He was president of the Hollywood Lions Club, as well as district governor of the organization and a master of the Cahuenga Lodge of Masons. He was on the board of directors of the Hollywood Bowl and Hollywood YMCA and was active in the First Methodist Church of Hollywood.

Baker died July 15, 1969, at the age of 81 in Laguna Beach, California. Services were held at Laguna Hills United Methodist Church, and burial followed at Grand View Memorial Park Cemetery, Glendale.

== Public service ==
=== Board of education ===
Baker won a seat on the Board of Education in 1949 when he was opposed by John T. Gardner, a union leader. He served for two years and then ran for the City Council.

=== City Council ===
==== Elections ====
Baker was easily elected in the primary vote for Los Angeles City Council District 2, over incumbent Lloyd G. Davies, whose ill health had forced him to miss many City Council meetings. In that era, the 2nd District represented Hollywood and a sizable portion of the San Fernando Valley, generally west of Ventura Boulevard and extending north to Encino. He was reelected in 1953 and 1955, and was defeated by Lemoine Blanchard in a runoff in 1959 after City Council terms were extended to four years.

==== Positions ====
Conservative. Baker was known as a conservative and was supported by the Los Angeles unit of the conservative political group Pro America.

Statue. He introduced a resolution urging the Board of Public Works to cancel a $10,000 contract with artist Bernard Rosenthal for a modernistic artwork of a family grouping that was cast and eventually installed in front a new Police Building opposite the City Hall. He noted "manifest strong public objection" to the piece.

Preceded by Lloyd G. Davies	Los Angeles City Council; 2nd District; 1951–59	Succeeded by C. Lemoine Blanchard
