= Daniel Innes =

American politician

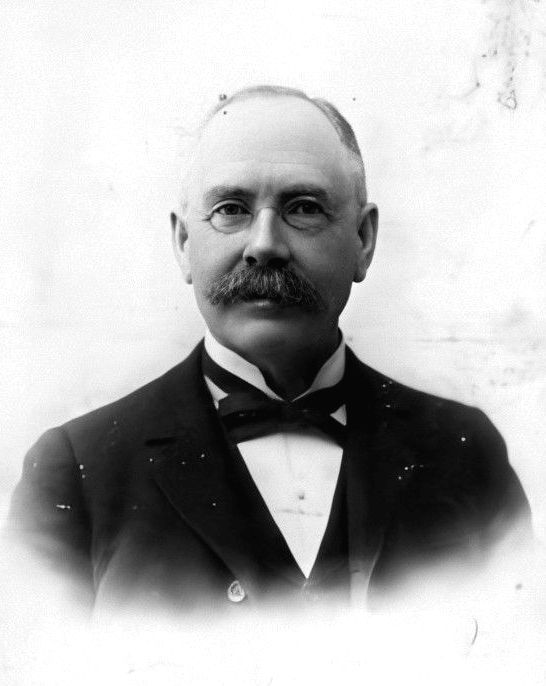

Member of the Los Angeles City Council from the 2nd ward
- In office December 5, 1890 – December 12, 1894
- Preceded by: George P. McLain
- Succeeded by: Meredith P. Snyder

Personal details
- Born: October 22, 1835 Lairg, Scotland
- Died: July 20, 1918 (aged 82) Los Angeles, California
- Resting place: Angelus-Rosedale Cemetery
- Party: Democratic

Daniel Innes (October 22, 1835 – July 20, 1918) was a Scottish-American businessman and politician. He operated dry-goods businesses in Illinois and Kansas, and in his later life engaged in real estate development and investment in Los Angeles, California. He went on to become a member of Los Angeles City Council for the period 1890-94. Innes' Eastlake-style house at 1329 Carroll Avenue in Angelino Heights is known for its later use as the fictional Halliwell Manor in the television series Charmed.

== Early life ==
Innes was born October 22, 1835, in Lairg, Scotland, to William and Catharine (MacDonald) Innes, and emigrated to Buffalo, New York, at the age of 14. He moved to Chicago, Illinois, in 1865 and established a dry-goods business there. Four years later he opened a larger store in Elgin, Illinois. He married Sarah Katherine "S. Kate" Pease in Elgin, Illinois on March 3, 1870. In 1871 he opened another store in Lawrence, Kansas, with his brother, George Innes.

Together they moved to California in 1885 and engaged in real estate development, opening several tracts in Angelino Heights, Los Angeles. Innes built their house at 1329 Carroll Avenue near Echo Park in Angelino Heights, known as the Innes House. It was used as the exterior shots of "Halliwell Manor" in the WB television series Charmed.

== Career ==
Innes made investments in the Breidenbach Iron Stone Company, to manufacture and sell machinery, wagons and hardware; Bisbee West Copper, mining in Arizona and the Stricker Hotel Company.

He was a member of the Los Angeles City Council in 1890-94, representing the 2nd Ward. He ran for re-election in 1894 but was defeated.

== Personal life ==
He had a hobby of collecting coins. Innes died on July 20, 1918, at the age of 82. He was survived by his wife, Sarah Katherine "S. Kate" Innes, and three children, Mrs. Willard J. Doran (Sarah), Walter P. Innes and William A. Innes.

== Innes House ==
- Innes House
- U.S. Historic district – Contributing property
- Los Angeles Historic-Cultural Monument
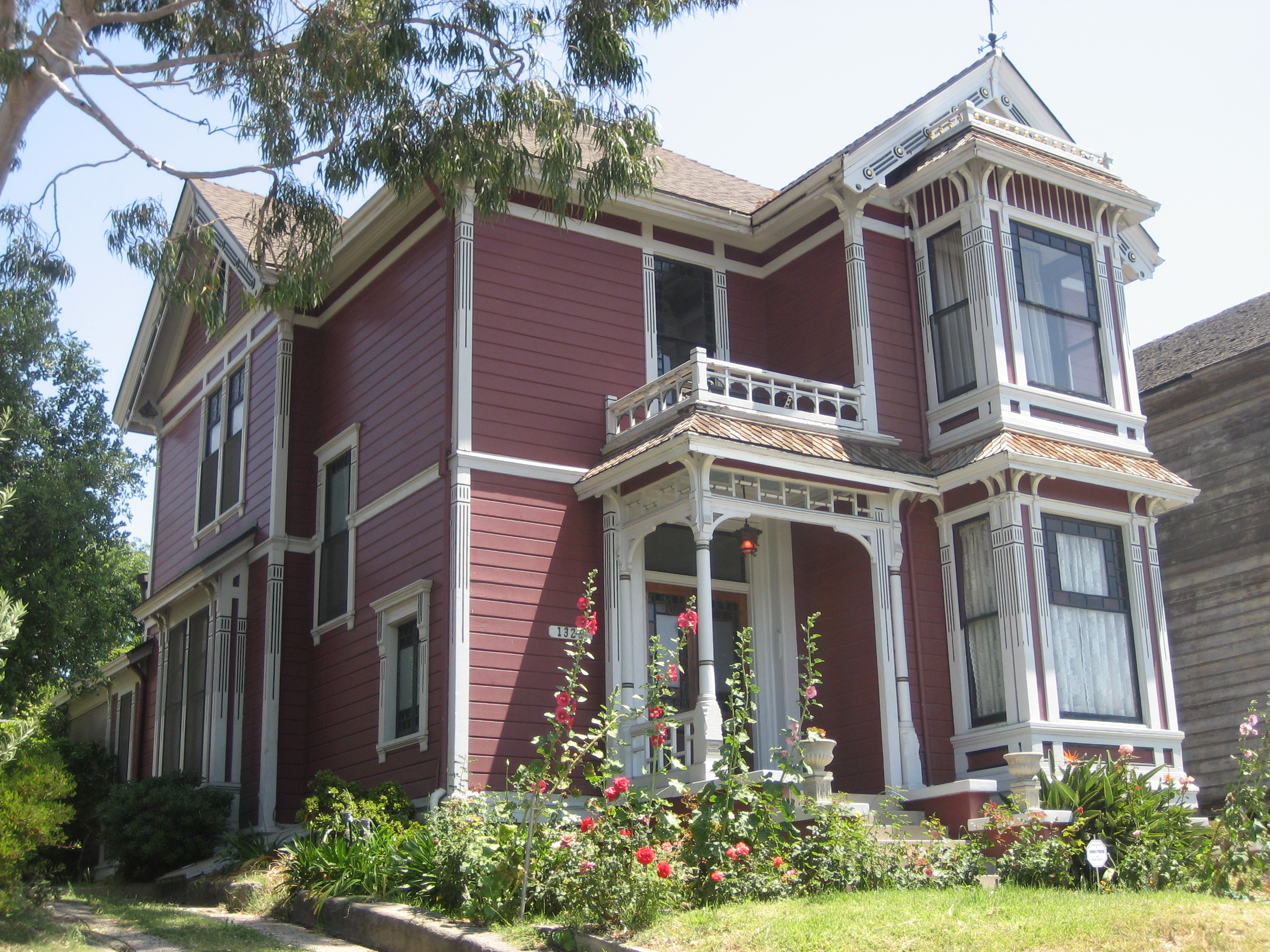
- Built: 1887–1888
- Architectural style: Eastlake
- Part of: Carroll Avenue, 1300 Block (ID76000488)
- LAHCM No.: 73

Significant dates
- Added to NRHP: April 22, 1976
- Designated LAHCM: February 3, 1971

The Innes House was built for Daniel and S. Kate Innes in 1887–1888, as one of the first houses in the Angelino Heights neighborhood. The house is an Eastlake-style mansion, with interior redwood trim.

The Innes family sold the house to barber Dominic Iannorone in 1920, and that year, the downstairs bathroom was remodeled to include terrazzo walls and flooring. Iannorone died in 1971. The house was listed as a Los Angeles Historic-Cultural Monument in 1971, and a National Register of Historic Places contributing property in 1976. When the house was listed on the National Register, it was owned by Planaria Knill and Charles C. Knill.

The Innes House has been used in multiple film productions, including the 1981 miniseries East of Eden and the 1998–2006 series Charmed. In Charmed, the Innes House serves as the exterior of Halliwell Manor in San Francisco, the home of the series' three protagonists. The Los Angeles Conservancy holds an easement on the house's exterior and some interior detail.

Preceded by George P. McLain	Los Angeles City Council, 1889–1909; 2nd Ward; 1890–94	Succeeded by Meredith Pinxton Snyder
