= George P. McLain =

Los Angeles California politician

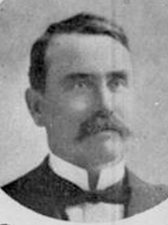

Member of the Los Angeles City Council for the 2nd ward
- In office February 25, 1889 – December 5, 1890
- Preceded by: District established
- Succeeded by: Daniel Innes
- In office December 12, 1900 – December 5, 1902
- Preceded by: Fred L. Baker
- Succeeded by: Chauncey Fitch Skilling

Personal details
- Born: August 26, 1847 Fredericksburg, Virginia
- Died: August 5, 1930 (aged 82) Los Angeles, California
- Party: Republican

Military service
- Allegiance: United States
- Branch/service: United States Army
- Battles/wars: American Civil War

George P. McLain (August 26, 1847 – August 5, 1930) was a Civil War veteran, a covered-wagon pioneer and an advertising man who became a member of the Los Angeles, California, City Council at the turn of the 19th–20th centuries and was also on the Fire Commission in that city.

== Biography ==
McLain was born on August 26, 1847, in Fredericksburg, Virginia, the son of James S. McLain and Sarah Graham Luckett, both of Virginia. He attended public schools in Illinois and the state normal school in Bloomington, Illinois. He enlisted in the Army in September 1863 and saw Civil War service in Kentucky and Tennessee with Company L, 16th Illinois Cavalry. He was mustered out in Nashville, Tennessee, on August 27, 1865.

He was recognized as a "covered wagon pioneer" who made his way west beginning in St. Joseph, Missouri, in 1866 with four yoked oxen. He freighted along the Platte River to Salt Lake City, and then to Helena, Montana; he returned to Salt Lake with horse teams before moving on to Prescott, Arizona, and then to Los Angeles, where he settled on January 2, 1867.

He was married to Guadalupie Billderain of Los Angeles; they had children George B. and Olympia (Byrd). A daughter, Agnes, died in February 1891 at age 17 months. His wife, Guadalupe, died on November 13, 1892, at the age of 39.

He was active in the Elks Club in Los Angeles, being treasurer for thirteen years. Other memberships were in the Sons of the Revolution, Union League Club, Los Angeles Pioneers, Odd Fellows and Independent Order of Foresters. He was a Protestant.

He died in Los Angeles on August 5, 1930. His home at that time was 1024 North La Jolla Avenue.

== Business ==
Upon arrival in Los Angeles, McLain was a machinist with Perry and Woodward Company for three years and then joined the Griffith and Lynch Lumber Company, but he was best known for his ownership of an advertising, or bill-posting business. He was a firefighter in 1889–90 and a deputy sheriff in 1891–93. For a time he was manager of the opera house in Los Angeles, resigning in 1891 when his wife died.

McLain's rival in the advertising field was E. W. Campbell, who complained to the City Council in May 1893 that McLain, who was then in partnership with Lehman, was allowed to post his advertising bills on a fire-engine house next to the Plaza but that Campbell was not. In his petition, Campbell stated: "I also protest against George McLain as a Fire Commissioner representing himself as a Police Commissioner, and telling people they will not get their saloon license if they do not give their posting to him." The Los Angeles Times reported the aftermath:

Mr. McLain called at Campbell's office and "biffed" that gentleman about the statements set forth in the petition, whereupon Campbell reached into his money-drawer for a pistol therein kept. This proceeding was followed by McLain grabbing the firearm and striking Campbell over the head with it.

A City Council committee investigated Campbell's charges, which were found lacking, and the council as a whole "exonerated" McLain of the accusations. McLain pleaded guilty to a charge of battery on Campbell and was fined $5.

McLain later accused Campbell of having opened a letter that was addressed to him, McLain, and using the information within it to solicit business from a San Francisco firm. Campbell was arrested and held to answer to a federal charge of tampering with the mails.

In 1896, the Merchants' Ad-Sign Company purchased the "plant and good will" of McLain's City Bill Posting Company.

== Public service ==
McLain was active in Republican politics, being a member of both the county and the state central committees. He was a member of the Los Angeles City Council from 1889 to 1891 and again from 1900 fto 1902, representing the 2nd Ward. He was on the Fire Commission in 1893–95 and on the Police Commission in 1897–99.

McLain put himself forward as a candidate for the Republican nomination for sheriff at least twice—in 1892—and 1898, when the Times opposed him because he permitted "the disreputable elements of the push to take a prominent part in his campaign." His bid for nomination lost at the Republican convention—he came in third in a field of six candidates.

== Landlord ==
From the Los Angeles Times, March 20, 1887:

George P. McLain owns a house on Requena Street, which is rented to Rose King, a lady of easy virtue. As the rent has not been paid for some time, George has become a little anxious, and yesterday sued out a writ of attachment for $180, rent due from October 5, 1886. Constable Smith went down to enforce the law, and though he met with protestations and tears on the part of defendant, he inexorably did his duty by levying on an Arion piano.

== Honor ==
McLain was honored with the renaming of a fire engine, one of the first to be rehabilitated in a new city "machine shop for the rehabilitation of fire engines." They previously had to be sent to San Francisco or Ohio for work. "Engine No. 1, thoroughly refitted and christened the 'George P. McLain,' . . . will appear in the Fiesta parade," the Times reported.

Preceded by —	Los Angeles City Council; 2nd Ward; 1889–91	Succeeded by Daniel Innes
