= Chauncey Fitch Skilling =

American architect and politician

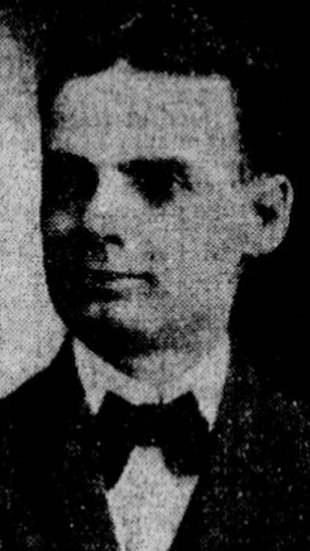

Member of the Los Angeles City Council for the 2nd ward
- In office December 5, 1902 – December 8, 1904
- Preceded by: George P. McLain
- Succeeded by: Percy V. Hammon

Personal details
- Born: December 7, 1868 Manchester, Illinois
- Died: September 26, 1919 (aged 50) Los Angeles, California
- Party: Republican

Chauncey Fitch Skilling (December 7, 1868 – February 14, 1945) was an architect from Los Angeles, who was also a member of that city's school board and of its city council.

== Personal ==
Skilling was born on December 7, 1868, in Manchester, Illinois, the son of Josiah Hamilton Skilling of Ireland and Margaret Lucy Thompson of Athens, Ohio. His brothers were Edward H., William T. and Robert P. Coming to Los Angeles in 1886, he attended Los Angeles State Normal School and the University of Southern California (1892), followed by a year at a business college (1893).

He was a Presbyterian and a Republican.

Residing at 1051 S. Lucerne Boulevard, he died of pneumonia at the age of 78 on February 14, 1945. Skilling was survived by brothers William T. of San Diego, California, and Robert P. of Newark, New Jersey.

Chief structural engineer of the World Trade Center, John Skilling, was a relative, the grandson of his brother Edward.

== Architecture ==
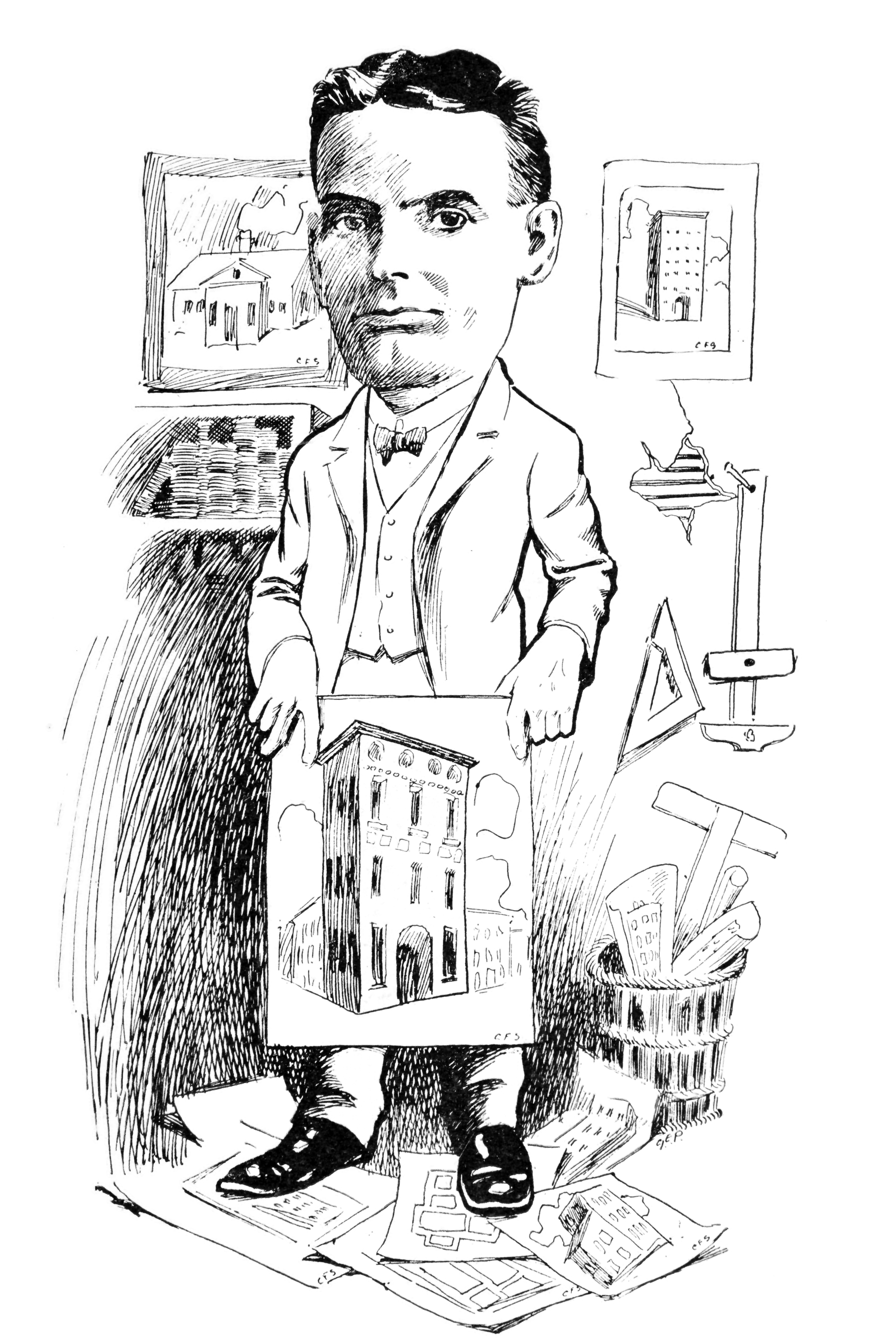
Skilling, taken from a book of caricatures, 1900

His first recorded job was as a draftsman around 1892–94. Before going into business for himself as an architect, he was a partner of John C. W. Austin and later of Otto Neher.

Skilling "designed and supervised construction of Immanuel Presbyterian Church and of dozens of other churches and schools in Southern California." Some of these, either planned or completed, were:

- Residence for W. W. Richardson on Occidental Boulevard (with Otto Neher), in an English renaissance style, "with simple lines in the design of the half timbers as well as the roof line." The lower story had a "large reception room, living rooms, library, den, dining room, kitchen and servants' room." The upper floor had four bedrooms, a dressing room and bathrooms. There was a furnace, automatic water heater and "all latest conveniences."
- White glazed marble and tile building on North Broadway near Avenue 22 in Lincoln Heights, Los Angeles, (with Otto Neher) featuring a "very pretty cupola skylight of stained glass" for the Federal Bank., Los Angeles Historical-Cultural Monument No. 396.
- $400,000 Auditorium Hotel, on a 60x169-foot lot on the northwest corner of Olive and Fifth Streets for oilman R.D. Wade, in modern classic design, seven stories and a basement, facing the Temple Auditorium (never built). It was planned with a lobby, a "ladies' parlor," two passenger elevators, a freight elevator and a sidewalk elevator (with Otto Neher). There were to be 145 rooms, "hot and cold water and a bath room for every two rooms." A "modern cafe" was planned for the basement.
- Three-story apartment house on Sixth Street near Burlington Avenue for L.B. Cohn, with "24 rooms divided into 45 apartments with private baths, steam heat, wall beds, vacuum cleaning system, freight elevator, plumbing and electric fixtures (with Otto Neher).
- First Presbyterian Church, Santa Monica, 1921. "The church was planned to seat 1,100 at its opening."
- Bethany Lutheran Church of Hollywood, 4975 W. Sunset Boulevard, 1925. The church was dedicated on April 11, 1926. ["To Dedicate New Church" Los Angeles Times, April 10, 1926, Page A2]
- Immanuel Presbyterian Church #2, Los Angeles, Los Angeles Historical-Cultural Monument No. 743
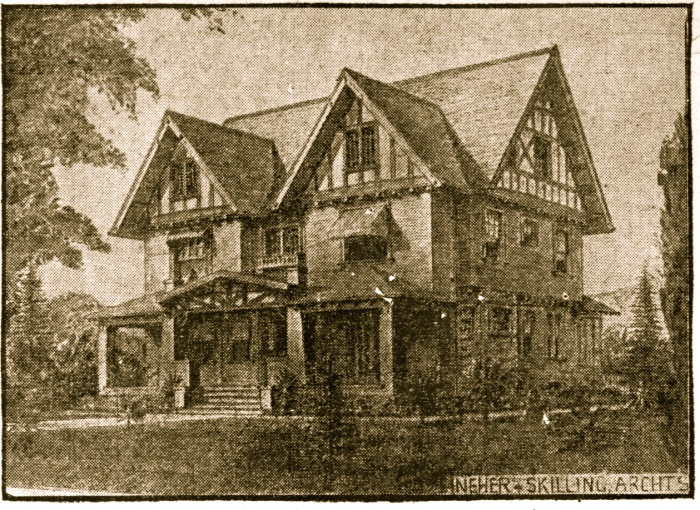
Richardson residence, 1909

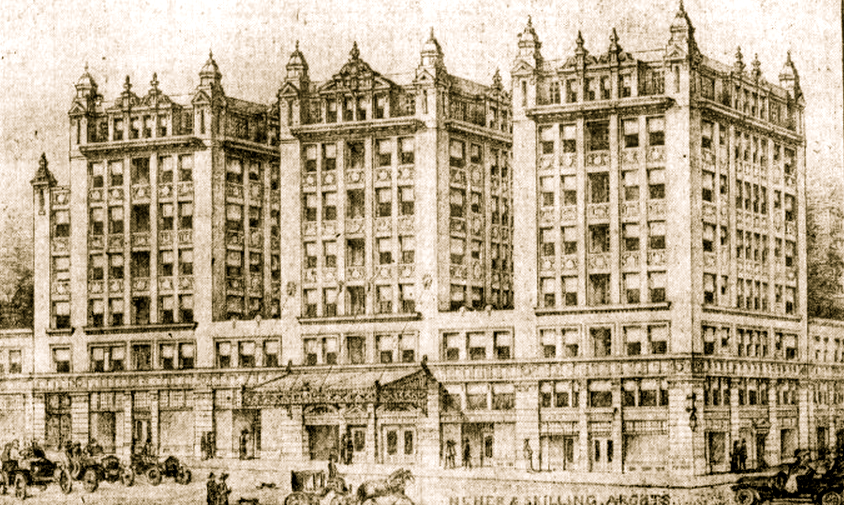
Hotel planned at Fifth and Olive, 1910

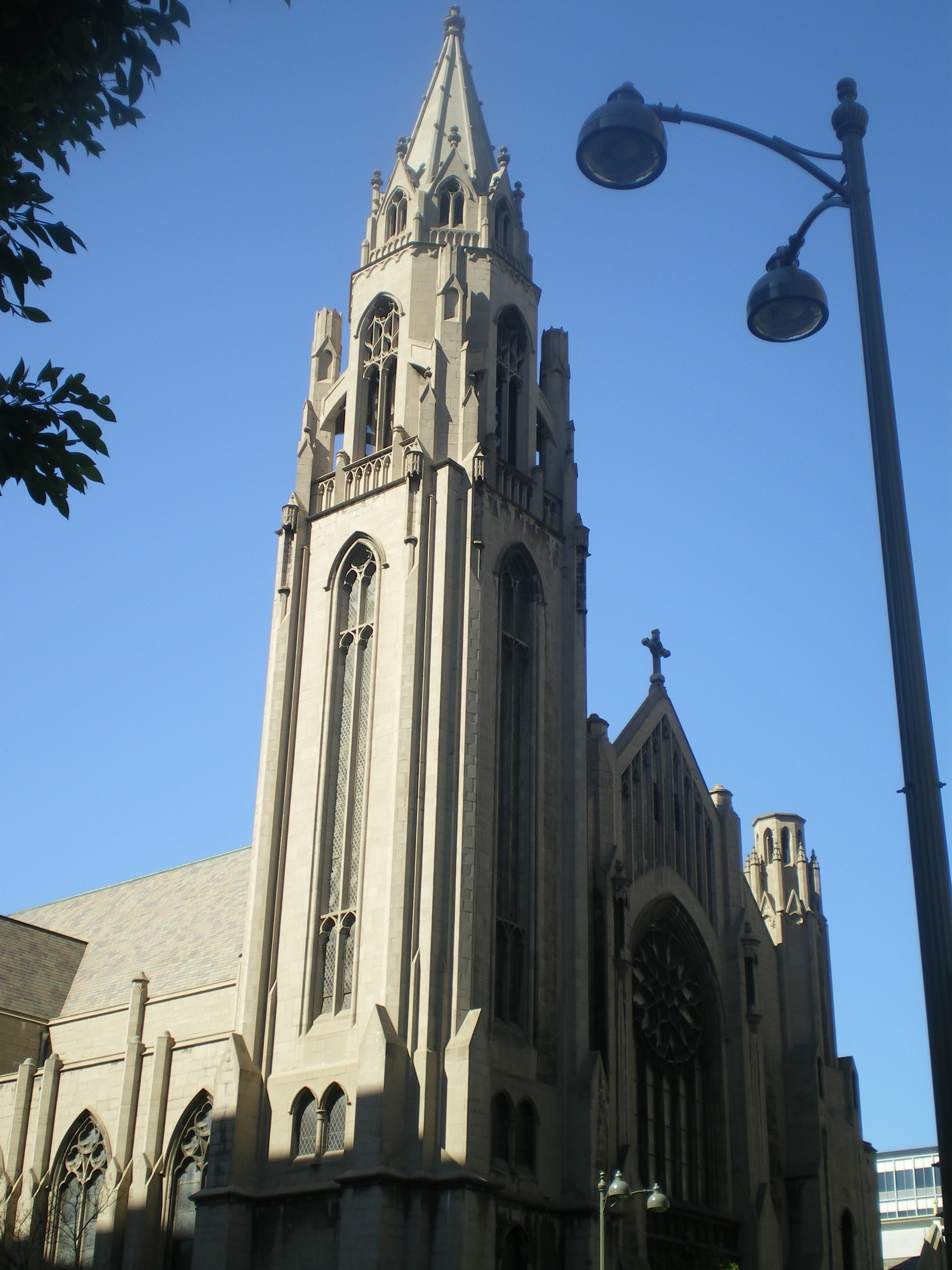
Immanuel Presbyterian Church, 1921

== Public service ==
Skilling served on the Board of Education in 1900-02 and was a member of the Los Angeles City Council in 1902–04. As a councilman, in 1904 he persuaded the City Council to pass an emergency ordinance that required patients with tuberculosis and other contagious diseases to be treated in hospitals in "sections of the city that are sufficiently isolated from populous districts to minimize the danger of contamination." He said that "energetic protests" had been made against such institutions in densely populated districts."

He advocated vocational training in the city schools and, with the aid of J.H. Francis, he helped pass a resolution through the City Council that resulted in the establishment of Los Angeles Polytechnic High School in 1906.
