= Keeping Room =

Keeping Room may refer to:

- The Keeping Room, a 2014 film
- Keeping room, a living space adjacent to a kitchen where family and guests can gather
