= Keeping room =

Room adjacent to a kitchen

Postcard showing an 1812 keeping room

A keeping room or hearth room is a room or informal living space adjacent to a kitchen where family and guests can gather while meals are being prepared.

== History ==
Keeping rooms have their origins in the 18th-century colonial United States, when they were also known as "hearth rooms". They allowed family members to enjoy the heat of the fireplace—the warmest area in the house—while staying out of the cook's way. Keeping rooms were areas for family members to sew, do household chores, read, play games, or simply stay warm during winter. They first appeared in New England, but were also featured in homes in the Southern United States.

In recent years, keeping rooms have experienced a revival in new home construction. Due to the modern availability of central heating, keeping rooms' purpose has shifted to focus more on entertaining and socializing.

== Design ==
Keeping rooms are considered distinct from dens and family rooms in that dens are secluded areas, while family rooms are not necessarily next to the kitchen and usually feature a television. They are typically smaller areas intended for two to four people.

The décor of keeping rooms emphasizes coziness and comfort, such as with rugs, pillows, and cushions. Modern keeping rooms may also feature a fireplace, like their historical equivalents. In the absence of a separate room, designers can create the feel of a keeping room by adding seating and tables to the kitchen. Some open-concept kitchens flow into a dining room or other space that can be used as a keeping room.

== Other usage ==
The term "keeping room" was used among Scotch-Irish immigrants in Georgia and the Carolinas to designate a parlor where a family's best furniture and other items such as silver and porcelain were kept. This usage was revived among interior decorators in the 1930s.

== See also ==
- Inglenook
