= Chateau Nous =

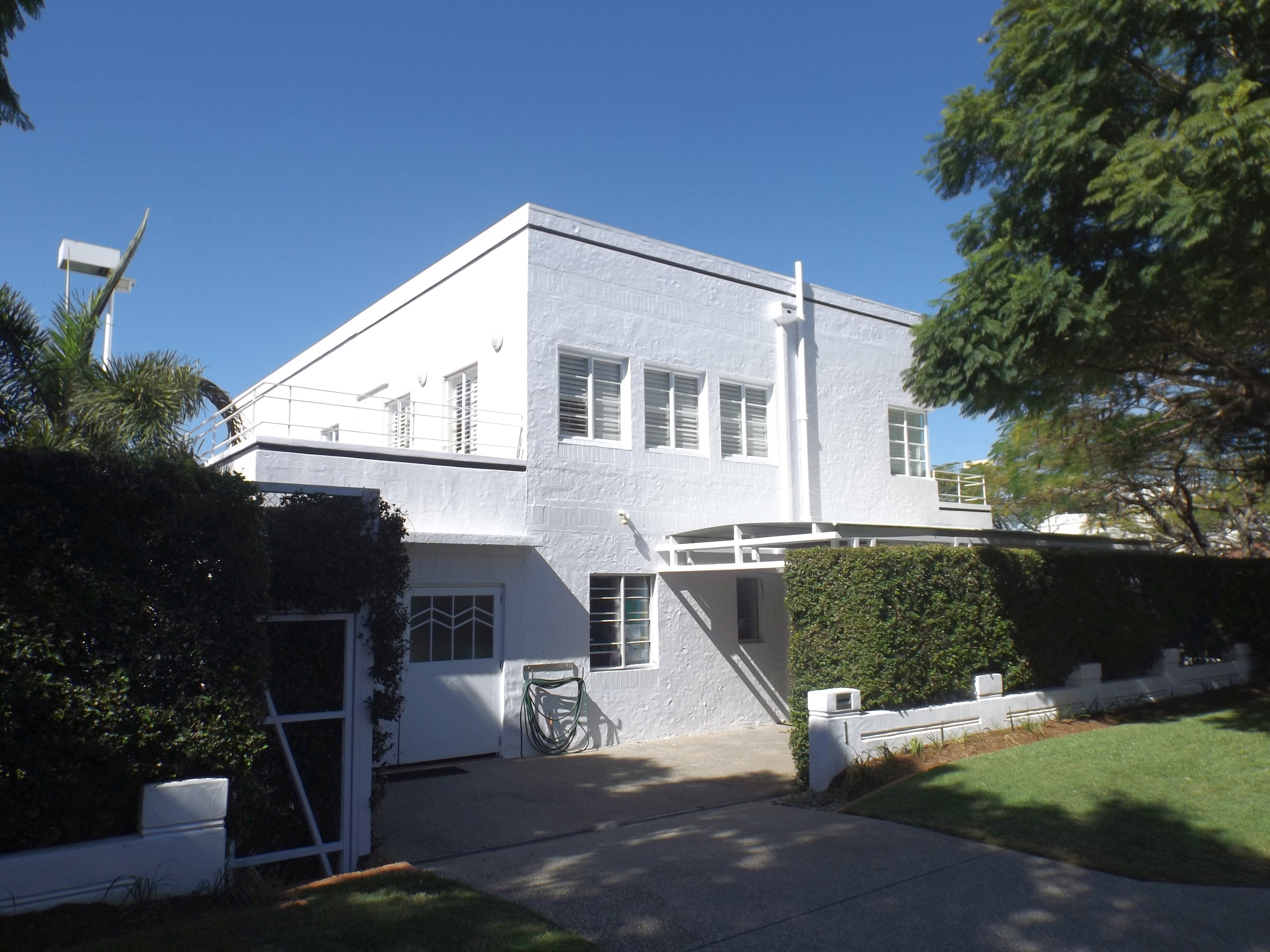
- Residence in 2015

- Location within Queensland Location within Australia
- 27.4327°S 153.0627°E
- Location: 1 Rupert Terrace, Ascot, Queensland, Australia

History
- Design period: 1919–1930s (interwar period)
- Built: c. 1937–1940s

Site notes
- Architect: Douglas Francis Woodcraft Roberts

Queensland Heritage Register
- Official name: Chateau Nous
- Type: state heritage (built)
- Designated: 21 October 1992
- Reference no.: 600047
- Significant period: 1930s–1940s (fabric & historical)
- Significant components: air raid shelter, garage, residential accommodation – servants' quarters, fence/wall – perimeter, residential accommodation – main house

Chateau Nous is a heritage-listed villa at 1 Rupert Terrace, Ascot, Queensland, Australia. It was designed by architect Douglas Roberts and built from c. 1937 to 1940s. It was added to the Queensland Heritage Register on 21 October 1992.

== History ==
Chateau Nous is a two-storeyed rendered masonry house with a flat sheet metal roof concealed behind a parapet wall. An earlier house on the site was relocated in 1937 when the property was purchased by Brisbane dentist George Stewart and his wife Eileen.

They employed architect Douglas Francis Woodcraft Roberts to design the building. Roberts had travelled, worked and studied in the United States and designed the building from a Functionalist approach. His design was considered ultra modern for Brisbane in 1938, and incorporated many of the latest architectural trends and materials with a strong Art Deco influence to the interiors.

The house was noted for its all electric kitchen with appliances arranged in one line, and an electric dumb waiter servicing an upstairs breakfast room. The Stewarts employed four full-time staff; two maids, a nurse and a gardener.

Additions to the building started within two years of its completion, with the enclosure of the dining room, and of the balcony over the servants quarters for a billiard room. During the Second World War a reinforced concrete air raid shelter, which the Stewarts shared with their neighbours, was constructed.

After Dr Stewarts death in 1962 the building was rented until Brisbane architect Noel Robinson purchased it in 1979. An inground swimming pool was added and in 1985 an adjoining block of land was purchased. The following year a large extension in keeping with the architecture of the building and consisting of a family room, remodelled kitchen, terrace, garage, master bedroom and ensuite was added to the north, as well as a grass tennis court.

== Description ==
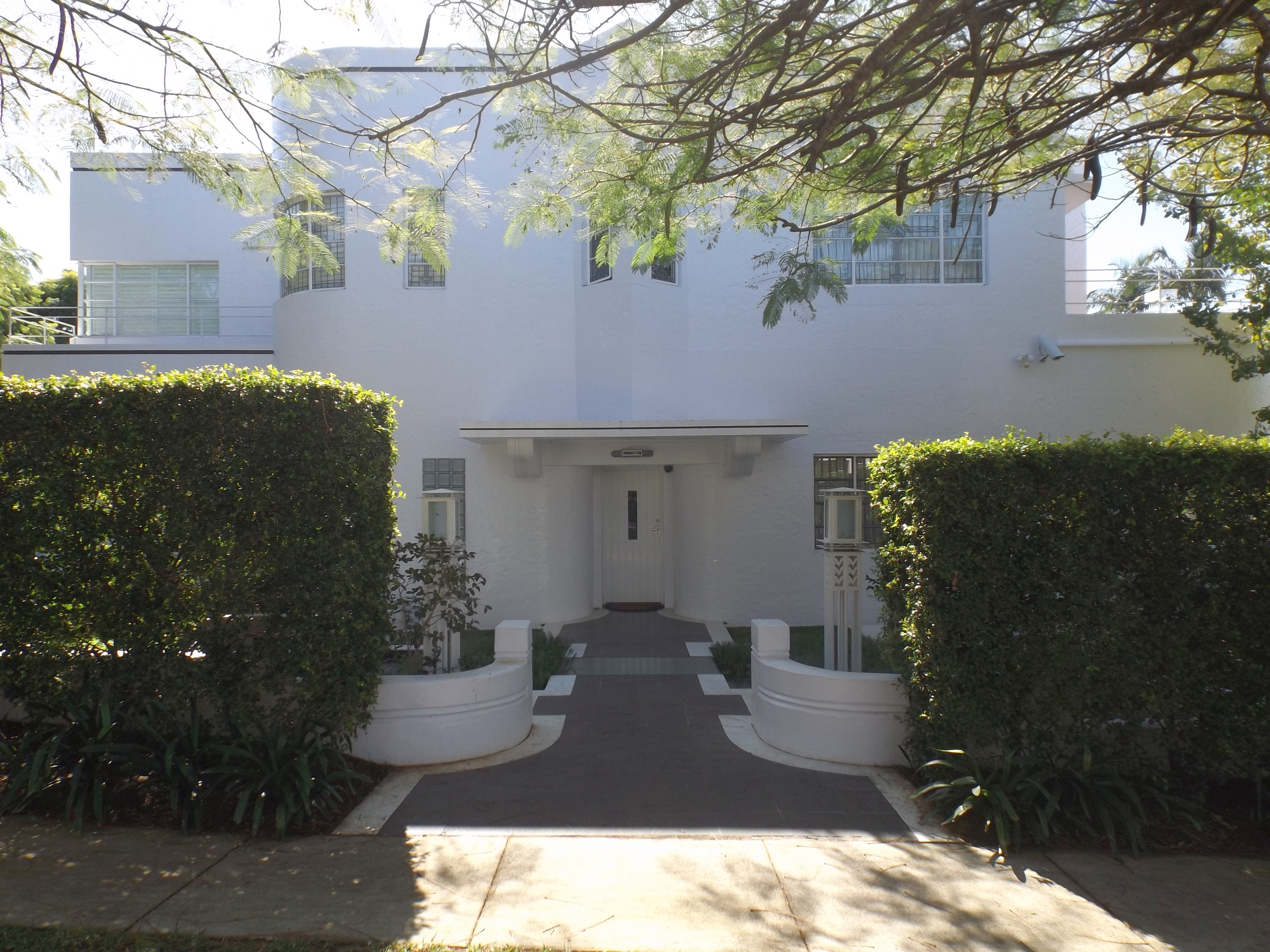
Front entrance, 2015

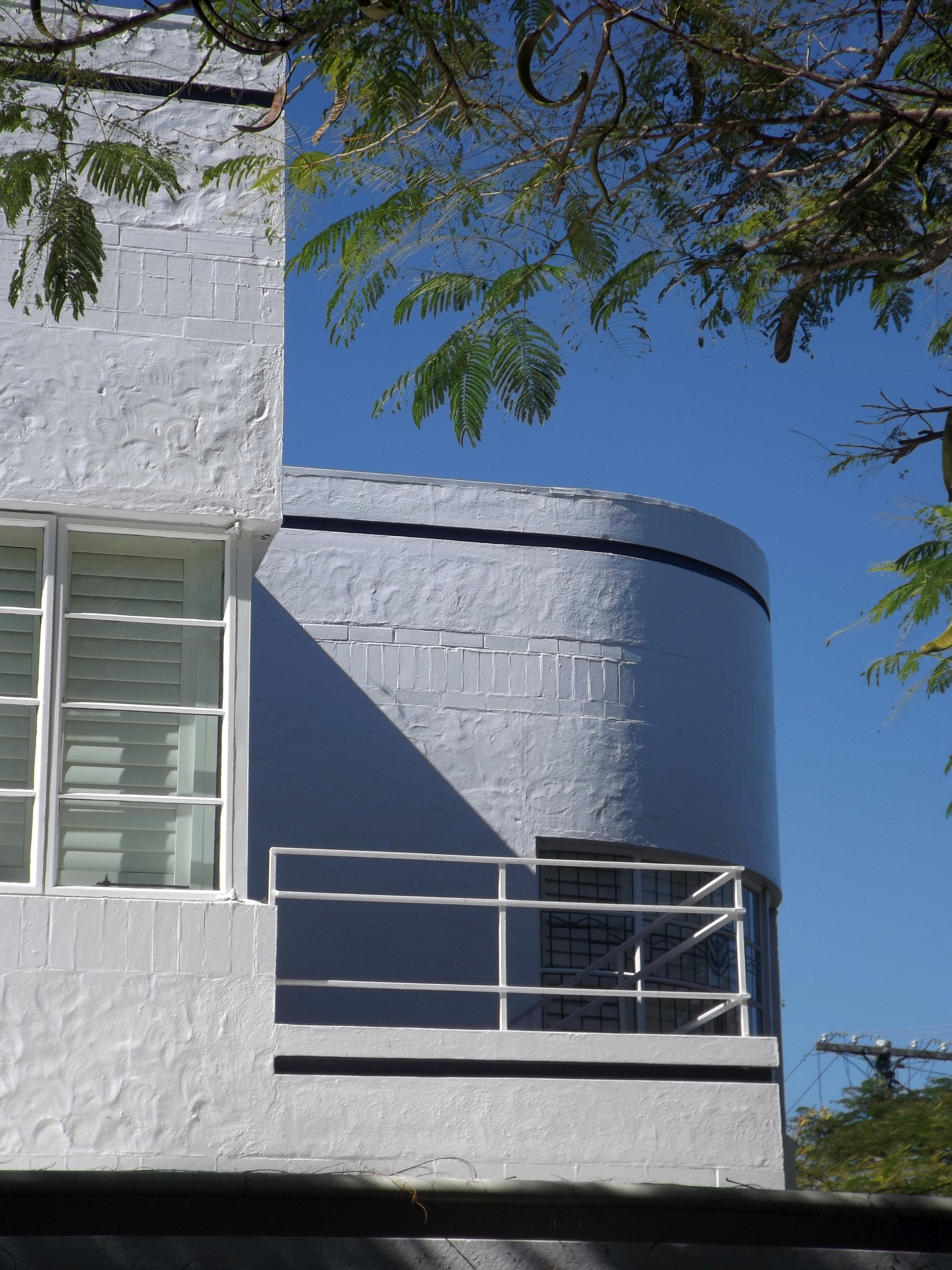
Upper level, 2015

This two-storeyed rendered masonry house, with a flat sheet metal roof concealed behind a parapet wall, sits on a level southeast corner site in Ascot. The building shows a strong Functionalist approach in its design, with architectural and decorative elements including brick banding, which is now painted over, curved corner walls and windows, glass bricks and contrasting vertical and horizontal elements.

The entrance is on the south, recessed below a flat concrete awning supported by large concrete brackets. Directly above is a projecting angled alcove, with windows to the first floor, which culminates at the parapet. The building has terracotta tiled roof decks with solid upstands and metal tubular railings to the southeast and northwest. The north side of the building sits on a face brick base with a dining terrace on the northeast, below the main bedroom, which overlooks the lawn tennis court to the north. The entrance to the subfloor air-raid shelter is located on the east below a projecting rounded pediment.

The building has metal framed casement windows, some of which have geometric leadlight panels with some windows set in curved walls. French doors, of both metal and timber frames, open onto decks which are shaded by recent metal framed canvas awnings. Awnings also shade windows to the west on the first floor. A recent timber framed carport with brick bases is attached to the western face, and trellises built in the same style are located at the south entry and at the north overlooking the tennis court.

Internally, walls are plastered and most rooms have decorative plaster ceilings. An Art Deco influence is evident with a nautical design, consisting of three concentric circles with intersecting rippled or straight lines, which is used in the wrought iron stair railing and repeated in the leadlight French doors opening off the foyer, is outlined in brass strips in the main bathroom's aggregate floor and is depicted on the chrome hood of the fireplace.

The foyer has a marble tiled floor which continues into the lounge and dining rooms and borders the carpeted stair. The foyer and stair walls are panelled with timber veneer to first floor height and the door into the kitchen has a glass porthole. The entrance door has a sandblasted panel with the inscription CHATEAU NOUS, and all doors and architraves are stained timber with chrome door hardware.

The lounge has a corner brick fireplace with a chrome hood and mirrored panels above the mantelpiece. The south wall has twin rows of vertical glass bricks and the east wall is rounded. A vertical row of glass bricks is located in the south wall of the informal dining room, which also has a servery to the L-shaped kitchen which has been refitted. The original garage is used as a guest bedroom, but retains the timber and glass garage doors which have also been reproduced for the more recent garage located on the northwest.

The former servants quarters are used for sewing and storage. The cork tiled family room extension is accessed from the kitchen, the junction of which has a lightwell which provides natural light and ventilation to the main bathroom above. The stairwell has a vertical row of glass bricks which is now backed by rice paper screens to the family room and bedroom above.

The first floor breakfast room has timber veneer wall panelling and a dumb waiter cabinet, which is no longer used. The projecting angled alcove above the entry is located in this room. The main bedroom extension has relocated the original bedroom window to the north wall and has a curved east wall with replica leadlight windows.

The main bathroom has green Vitrolite wall panels with a mauve bath and basin. The children's bedroom, which was originally a deck, has a flat concrete awning to its internal entrance and an internal window to the adjoining bedroom.

The grounds include an inground concrete swimming pool to the southeast and a lawn tennis court with timber and wire fencing to the north with dressing sheds built between these at the east. A low rendered masonry garden wall runs along both street frontages with a higher masonry wall screening the pool area.

== Heritage listing ==
Chateau Nous was listed on the Queensland Heritage Register on 21 October 1992 having satisfied the following criteria.

The place is important in demonstrating the evolution or pattern of Queensland's history.

Chateau Nous demonstrates rare aspects of Queensland's cultural heritage, in that it is an early example of Functionalist domestic architecture in Brisbane. The place is important in demonstrating the principal characteristics of a Functionalist building.

Chateau Nous is important in exhibiting a range of aesthetic characteristics valued by the community, in particular the contribution of the building and grounds, through scale, form and material, to the local streetscape and Ascot townscape, through the quality and intactness of the original Art Deco interior elements and as an example of both Functionalist and Art Deco design.

Chateau Nous is important in demonstrating a high degree of creative achievement for the late 1930s in Brisbane, in its adoption of Functionalist architecture.

Chateau Nous has a special association with architect DFW Roberts, as an unusual example of his domestic work, being an early use of Functionalist architecture in Brisbane.

The place demonstrates rare, uncommon or endangered aspects of Queensland's cultural heritage.

Chateau Nous demonstrates rare aspects of Queensland's cultural heritage, in that it is an early example of Functionalist domestic architecture in Brisbane.

The place is important in demonstrating the principal characteristics of a particular class of cultural places.

The place is important in demonstrating the principal characteristics of a Functionalist building.

The place is important because of its aesthetic significance.

Chateau Nous is important in exhibiting a range of aesthetic characteristics valued by the community, in particular the contribution of the building and grounds, through scale, form and material, to the local streetscape and Ascot townscape, through the quality and intactness of the original Art Deco interior elements and as an example of both Functionalist and Art Deco design.

The place is important in demonstrating a high degree of creative or technical achievement at a particular period.

Chateau Nous is important in demonstrating a high degree of creative achievement for the late 1930s in Brisbane, in its adoption of Functionalist architecture.

The place has a special association with the life or work of a particular person, group or organisation of importance in Queensland's history.

Chateau Nous has a special association with architect DFW Roberts, as an unusual example of his domestic work, being an early use of Functionalist architecture in Brisbane.
