= Man cave =

Male sanctuary in a home

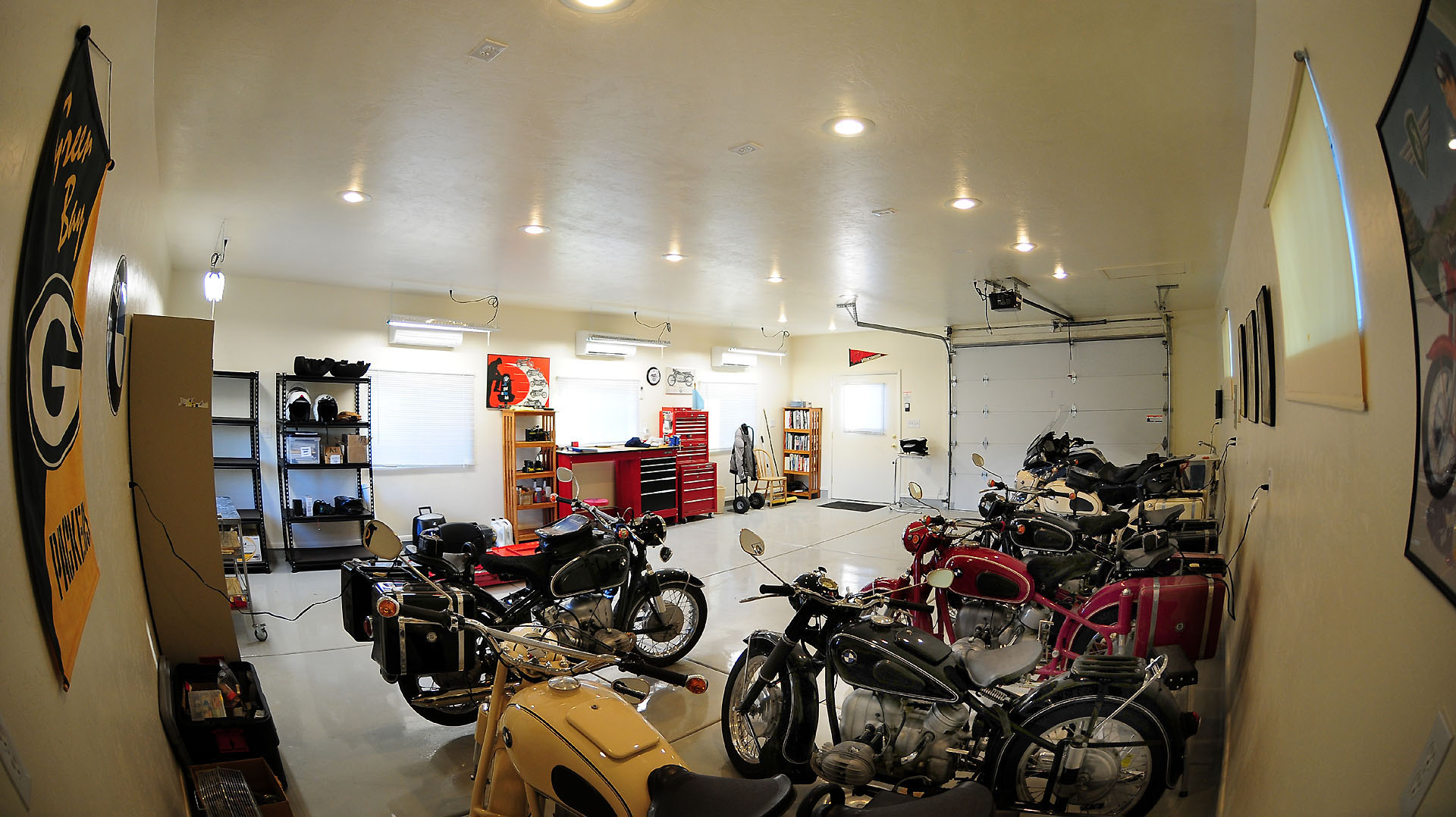
A motorcycle enthusiast's man cave

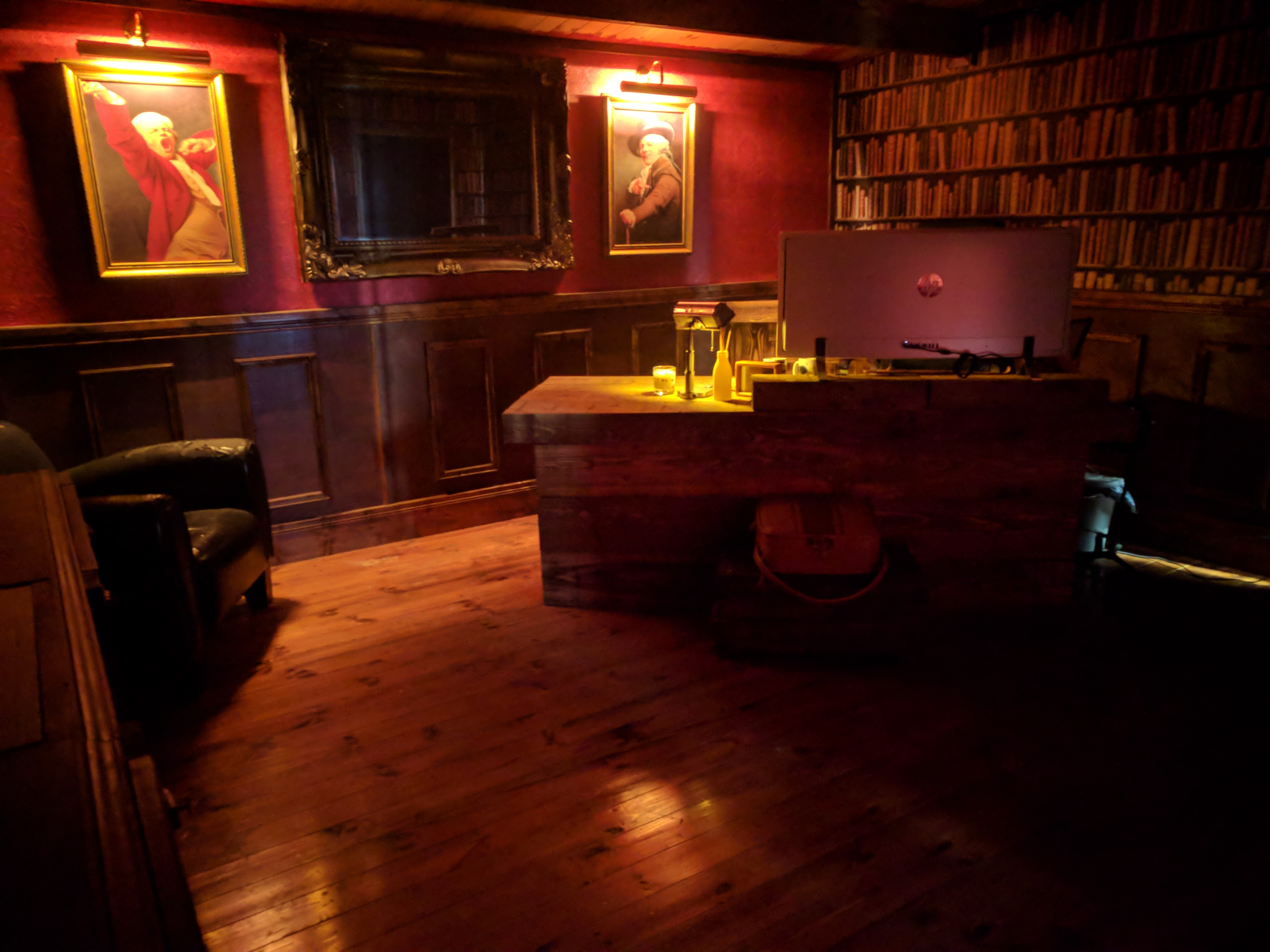
A man cave serving as a home office, 5 m × 5 m (16 ft × 16 ft) size

A man cave, mancave, or manspace, and less commonly a manland or mantuary, is a male retreat or sanctuary in a home, such as a specially equipped garage, spare bedroom, media room, den, basement, or tree house. The term "man cave" describes an area in the home where a man can do as he pleases in a masculine space.

== Etymology ==
The first known published use of the phrase is from March 21, 1992, in the Toronto Star by Joanne Lovering: "With his cave of solitude secured against wife intrusion by cold floors, musty smells and a few strategic cobwebs, he will stay down there for hours nestled in very manly magazines and open boxes of tools. Let's call the basement, man cave." The phrase gained traction with the 1993 publication of Men Are from Mars, Women Are from Venus by John Gray.

== Purpose ==
Man caves have multiple purposes: they are a place to be alone, to indulge in hobbies such as watching sports or playing video games, and to hang out with male friends. According to psychiatrist and author Scott Haltzman, it is important for a man to have a place to call his own.

Writer and handyman Sam Martin explained:

Men have had an identity problem since the women's movement. They have tried to figure out who they're supposed to be. For a while women wanted them to be more sensitive, so they were more sensitive. Then women wanted them to be more manly. One of the things I discovered is when men have their own manspace, what they put inside of it is really an expression of who they are. Manspace is about establishing an identity for a man. Our premise is that women have control of the look and the feel of the house and that left guys wanting more. Anybody who has a specific interest or hobby or work or collection is going to want a space to indulge that.

— Sam Martin, in the Chicago Tribune, 2007

Sociologist Tristan Bridges has interviewed American men and their partners about man caves, and found that many men rarely used their man caves. One interviewee said, "I feel like some day guys from my neighbourhood will congregate here after work and we'll share a beer and chat." When asked who these men from the neighborhood were, the interviewee replied "I don't know". Bridges stated that his research has turned partly into "a story about men's loneliness."

In 2005, Paula Aymer of Tufts University suggested it was the "last bastion of masculinity".

== Design ==
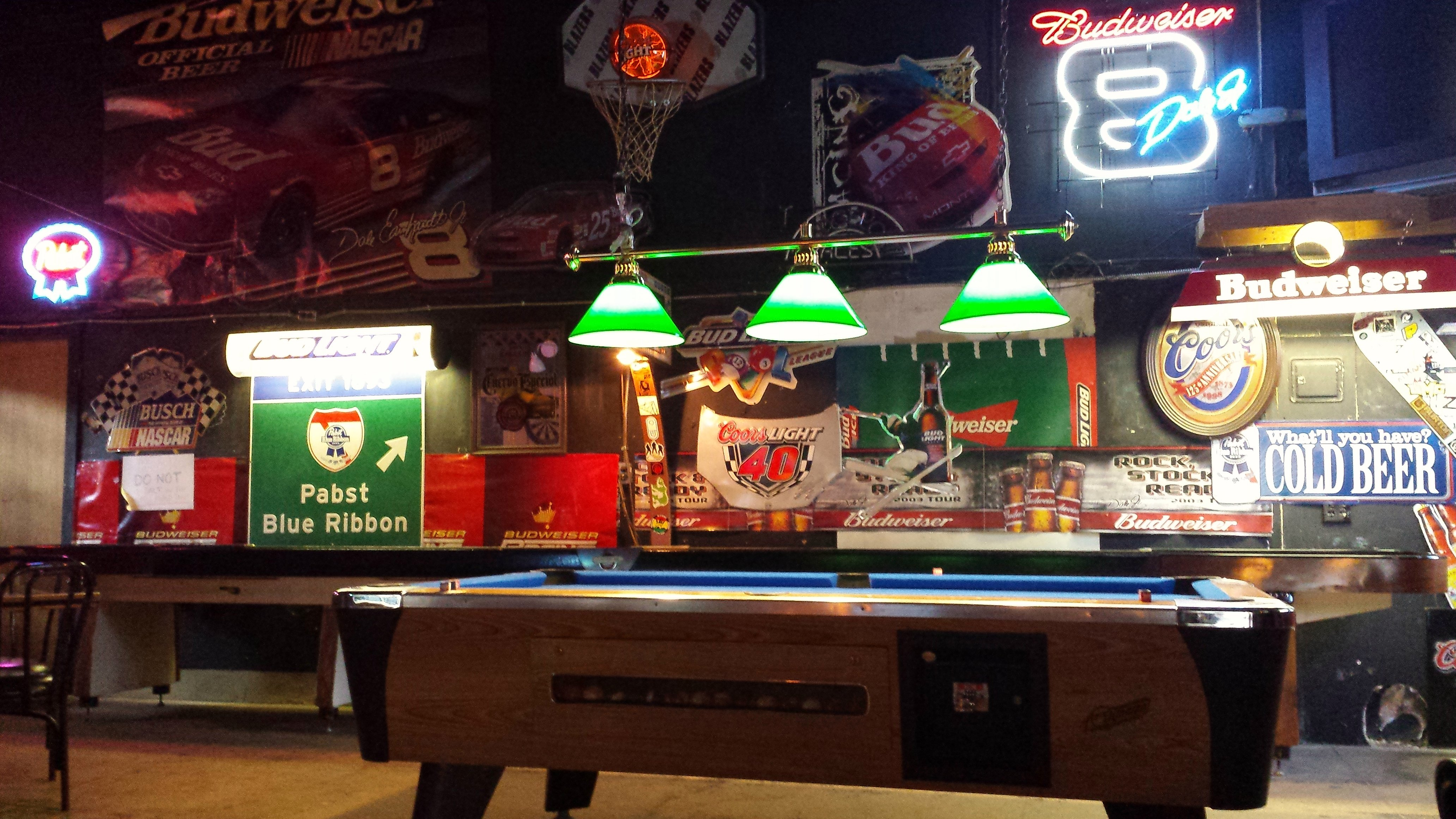
A man cave arranged as a pool room, with beer advertisements on the wall.

According to several sources, the general architectural and design trend of the early 2000s was for men to take traditionally male-only spaces, and equip them with masculine aesthetic choices. Man cave accessories include refrigerators, vending machines, putting greens, kegerators, giant TVs, musical instruments and gear, pool tables, boxing rings, entertainment centers, bars, and sports memorabilia such as trophies. Upscale sports-themed furnishings are available to outfit a man cave. The room may be large enough to accommodate a big screen television, often used for watching sports games with male friends.

In the book Where Men Hide, which Publishers Weekly described as an affable but only "sometimes thought provoking" guide, author James Twitchell and photographer Ken Ross explored areas where men like to be alone. According to Twitchell, some public male-only spaces, such as the barbershop, are declining and being replaced by spaces such as the "grimy garage." The book suggests that "men make their own spaces for good or ill."

Twitchell focused on communal man cave spaces such as male-only groups in megachurches, possibly a modern-day replacement for declining attendance at male-only clubs such as Masonic lodges. Twitchell noted that some anthropologists have speculated that these spots are a place for men to bond before hunting or war, and where they can "smoke or fart" and tell the "same jokes over and over again."

One man redecorated his space to look like a replica model of the bridge of the Starship Enterprise from the TV show Star Trek, while another man spent over two years and $120,000 to make his man cave into a Batcave.

Garages have typically been a male space since they "present a guy with an opportunity to disappear for hours while never leaving the premises." In 2007, it was common for men to "lavish time, money and attention on fixing this spot up", with the intention of making it more welcoming.

== Counterparts ==
Women have created similar spaces in which they can relax and pursue hobbies. These have been referred to as she shed, girl cave, and rarely, woman cave.

Sociologist Michael Kimmel has described the internet as providing "a man cave, a politically incorrect locker room, where you can say whatever you feel like saying".

== In popular culture ==
There have been several examples of man caves in pop culture, including:

- In the Batman franchise, the Batcave is the headquarters of the superhero Batman and his partners. It is located beneath Wayne Manor, personal residence of Batman's secret identity Bruce Wayne.
- In the TV sitcom Married... with Children, the garage is Al Bundy's only sanctuary, and is used to hold the recurring "No Ma'am" meetings.
- Tim Taylor's garage in the TV sitcom Home Improvement was used to "bring to life all manner of high-powered monster machines".
- In the TV show The Sopranos, Tony Soprano's gang would meet in a windowless "dingy office" at the Bada Bing strip club. It was a "guys-only place within a guys-only place."
- In the TV show The King of Queens, Doug Heffernan's garage is equipped with a big screen TV, beer fridge, and a couch where Doug and his friends watch football, baseball, and boxing and drink beer in peace away from Doug's wife, Carrie, and Doug's father-in-law, Arthur Spooner.
- In the 1988 movie Beetlejuice, Charles Deetz's den is the only room that survives an extensive home renovation initiated by his wife and her decorator.
- In the Nickelodeon comedy Henry Danger, the ManCave is named after superhero Captain Man.

== See also ==
- Alonement space
- Andron
- Bachelor pad
- Cabinet (room)
- Home tiki bars
- Male bonding
- Mancation
- ManSpace (TV series)
- Man Caves, a home renovation program specifically targeted in the creation of man caves.
- Personal space
- Radio shack
- Recreation room
- Shed
- Study (room)
