= Percy V. Hammon =

American politician

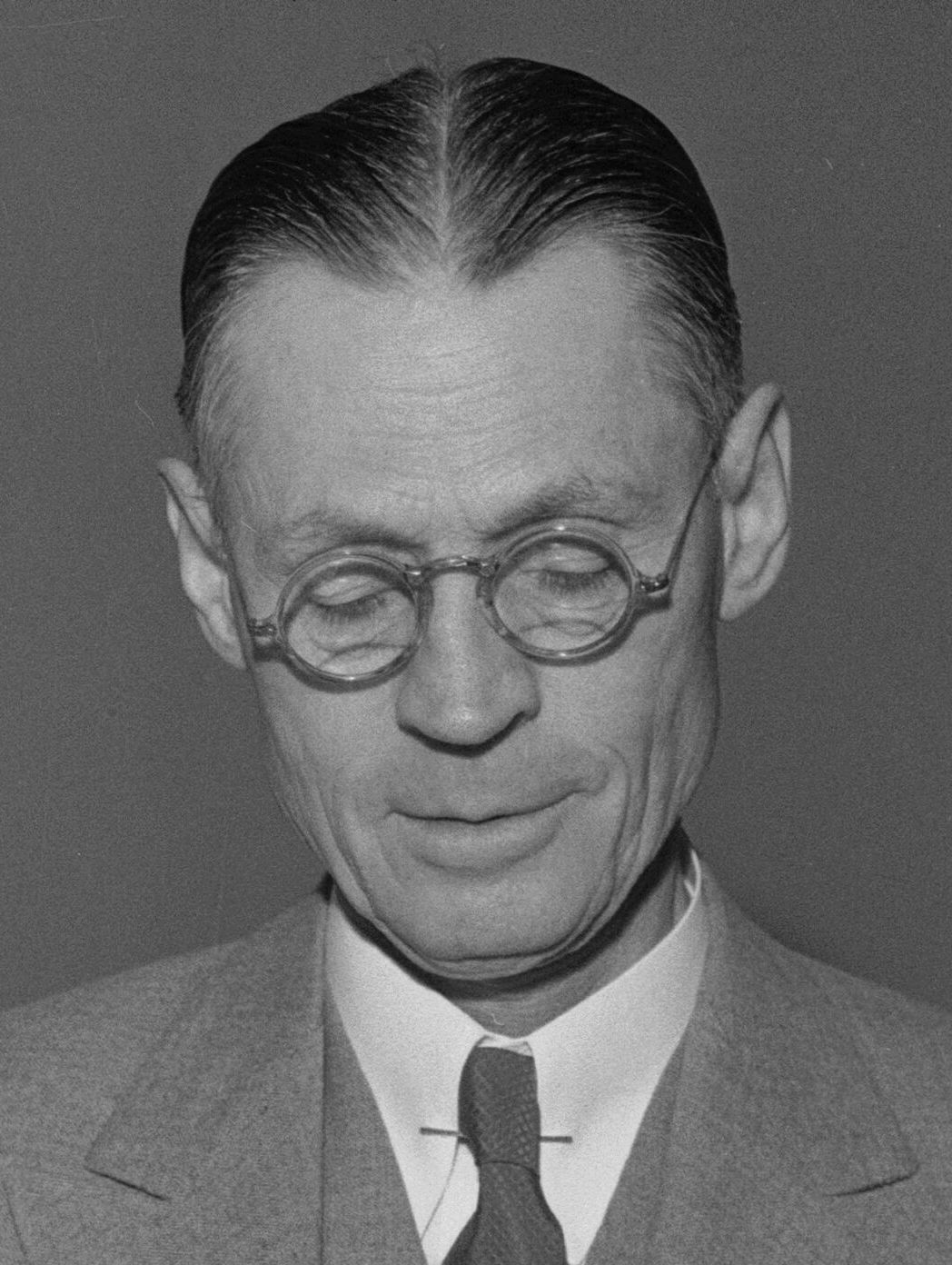
- Hammon in 1935

Member of the California State Assembly from the 75th district
- In office January 7, 1907 – January 2, 1911
- Preceded by: Henry E. Carter
- Succeeded by: William A. Lamb

Member of the Los Angeles City Council for the 2nd Ward
- In office December 8, 1904 – December 13, 1906
- Preceded by: Chauncey Fitch Skilling
- Succeeded by: Edward A. Clampitt

Member of the Los Angeles Board of Education for the 2nd Ward
- In office December 5, 1902 – December 8, 1904
- Preceded by: Chauncey Fitch Skilling
- Succeeded by: Edward A. Clampitt

Personal details
- Born: Percival Vernon Hammon; August 28, 1873 Spring Hill, Iowa
- Died: October 4, 1958 (aged 85) Los Angeles, California
- Party: Republican
- Spouse: Mabel Hammon
- Children: 2
- Education: Woodbury Business College (BBus); University of Southern California (LLB)

Percival Vernon Hammon (August 28, 1873 – October 4, 1958) was a politician who served in the California State Assembly from 1907 to 1913 and in the Los Angeles City Council for the 2nd Ward from 1904 to 1906. He also served as a Deputy City Attorney for 23 years.

== Early life and career ==
Hammon was born on August 28, 1873, in a lob cabin in Spring Hill, Iowa, moving to Los Angeles in 1895 where he attended Woodbury Business College. In 1889, he was a clerk for Isidore B. Dockweiler, and from 1900 to 1904, was employed at the Title Guarantee & Trust Company.

== Political career ==
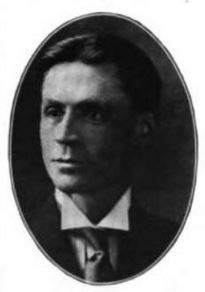
Hammon in 1912.

In 1904, Hammon was elected to the Los Angeles City Council for the 2nd ward. Two years later, he was elected to the California State Assembly for the 75th district and was re-elected in 1908. In 1907, after graduating from the University of Southern California, Hammon became a Deputy City Attorney under John D. Fredericks, resigning in 1915 to be in a private practice with W. Joseph Ford.

In 1920, it was believed that Hammon would become the county chairman for the California Republican Party. In 1929, he became a Deputy City Attorney again under Buron Fitts and was Fitts's legal adviser. In 1941, he was reassigned to Dockweiler, replacing William O. Russel. On July 20, 1943, Hammon retired from the post of Deputy City Attorney after 23 years.

== Personal life and death ==
On October 4, 1958, Hammon died in the Good Samaritan Hospital due to a heart ailment.
