= Edward A. Clampitt =

American politician

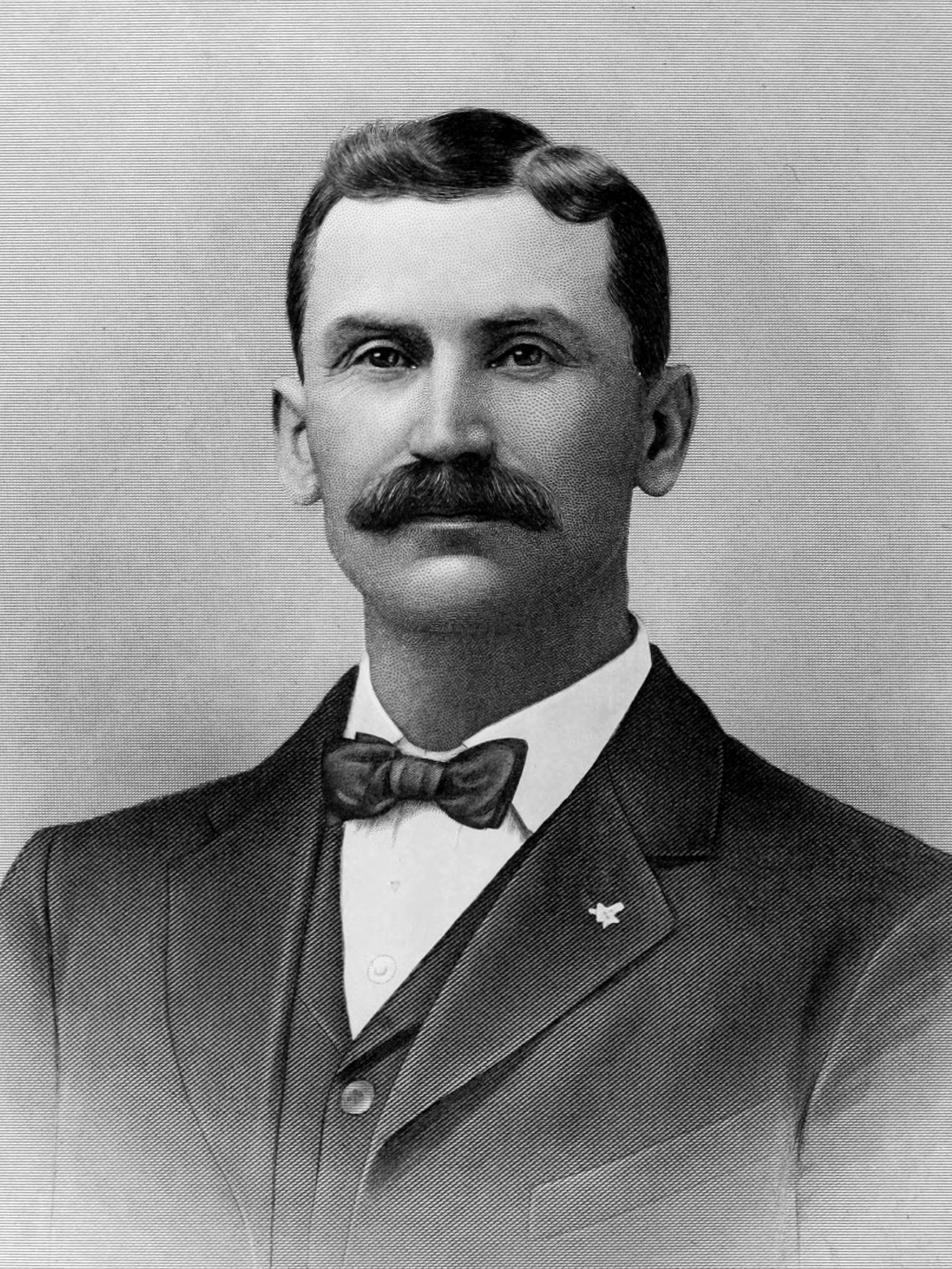

Member of the Los Angeles City Council for the 2nd ward
- In office December 13, 1906 – December 10, 1909
- Preceded by: Percy V. Hammon
- Succeeded by: District abolished

Personal details
- Born: December 14, 1868 Macon County, Illinois
- Died: September 26, 1919 (aged 50) Los Angeles, California
- Party: Republican
- Spouse: Margaret A. Wright (m. 1897)
- Children: 2

Edward Anthony Clampitt (December 14, 1868 – September 26, 1919) was a pioneer oilman in Los Angeles at the turn of the 19th–20th centuries. He was also an elected a member of the Los Angeles City Council.

== History ==
Clampitt was born in Macon County, Illinois, on December 14, 1868, the son of Mr. and Mrs. J. A. Clampitt. He moved to Los Angeles in 1888.

=== Business ===
Clampitt was one of the founding developers of the Los Angeles City Oil Field.

He was a director of the Columbia Oil Producing Company, which was later bought by Commonwealth Petroleum.

=== Community ===
Clampitt was elected to the Los Angeles City Council in 1906 and served three years. He was a member of the Republican State Central Committee, the Los Angeles Chamber of Commerce, Chamber of Mines and Oils, Los Angeles Athletic Club, the Elks, the Masons and the Knights of Pythias.

=== Death ===
Clampitt died on September 26, 1919, in his home at 301 South Alexandria Avenue in Los Angeles, California. He was survived by his wife Margaret M. Clampitt and their two daughters Leah and Barbara; his parents in Los Angeles; his brother L.A. Clampitt in San Fernando; and his sisters, Mrs. R. Raskin in Los Angeles and Mrs. A.P. McBride in Independence, Kansas.

Funeral services were conducted at the residence by Charles Edward Locke, and an escort of police officers, headed by Police Chief George K. Home accompanied the cortege to Inglewood Park Cemetery for burial.

Chief Home was an active pallbearer, and honorary pallbearers included Governor William Stephens, Mayor Meredith P. Snyder, Sheriff John C. Cline, District Attorney Thomas L. Woolwine and newspaper publisher Harry Chandler.
