= Recreation room =

Room used for recreation

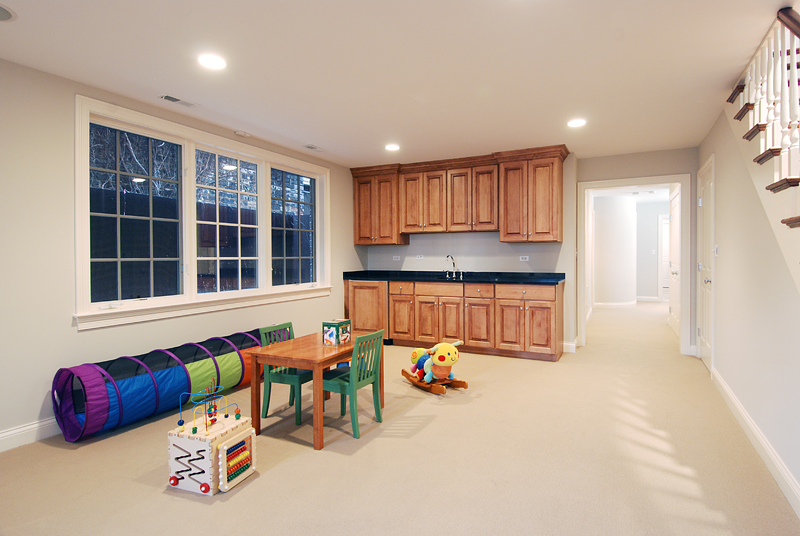
A recreation room arranged as a children's play area

A recreation room (also known as a rec room, rumpus room, play room, playroom, games room, or ruckus room) is a room used for a variety of purposes, such as parties, games and other everyday or casual activities. The term recreation room is most prevalent in the United States, while rumpus room is more common in Australia, New Zealand and Canada. In the United Kingdom, the most common term is games room, or sometimes den. Some, however, will have a room specific to one particular game or entertainment unit often found in a recreation room, or some have a snug, which is a smaller cosy room for watching films and playing video games. Often children and teenagers entertain their friends in their home's recreation room, which is often located in the basement, away from the main living areas of the house. Usually it is a larger space than a living room, enabling the area to serve multiple purposes and entertain moderately large groups.

== Contents ==
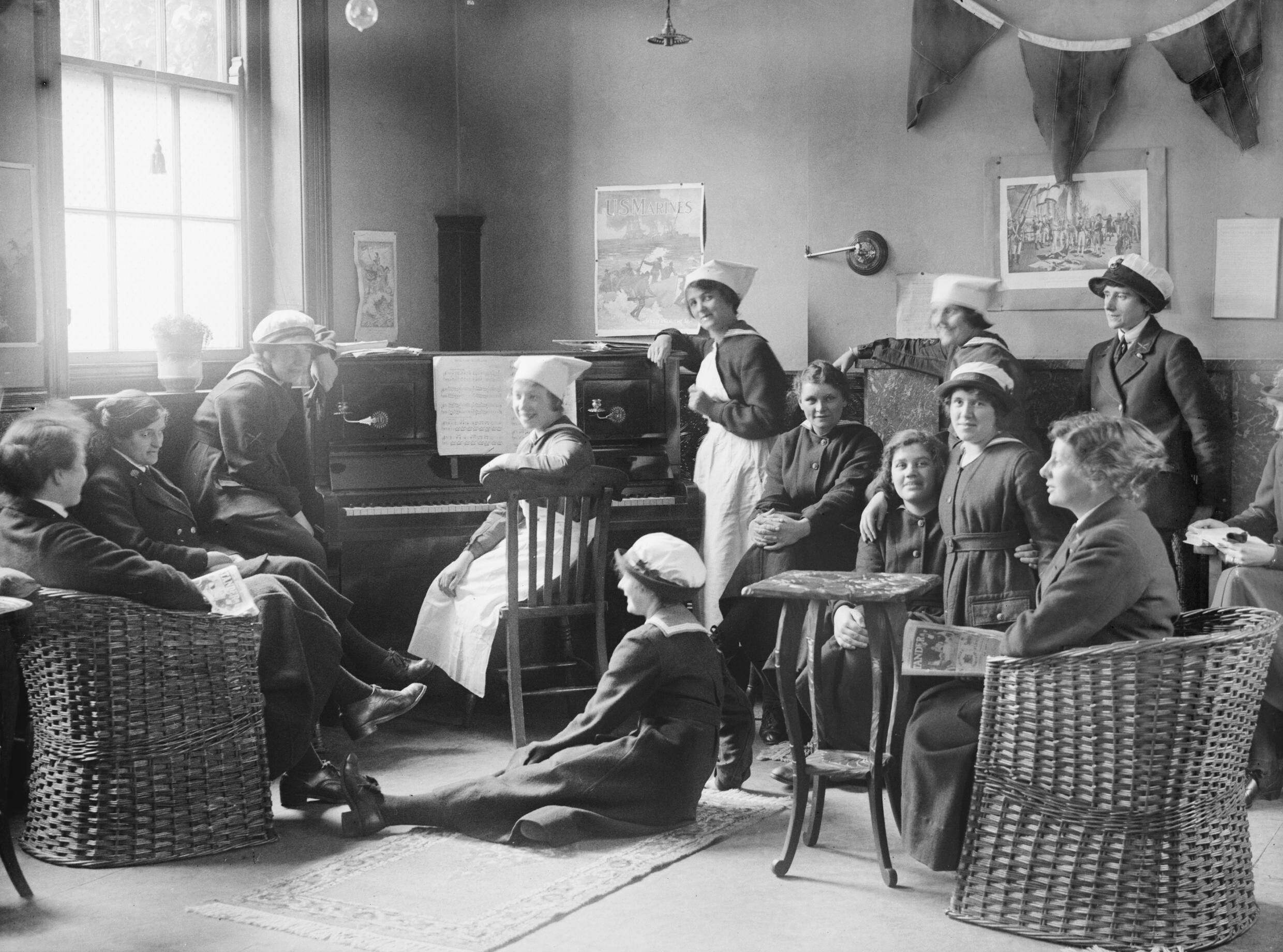
Members of the Women's Royal Naval Service relaxing while off-duty in their recreation room. Many military bases offer recreational facilities to servicemembers.

Recreation rooms can have many themes and contents, depending on their intended use.

=== Entertainment ===
Recreation rooms are normally centered on some form of entertainment, typically an audio/video setup. This can consist of something as elaborate as a projection screen with surround sound or something as simple as a base model television.

=== Seating ===
Couches, pub tables/chairs, bar stools, bean bag chairs, and recliners may all be used in recreation rooms.

=== Games ===
Tabletop games are frequent in recreation rooms. In addition to games played on a normal table, recreation rooms sometimes include custom game tables for table tennis (ping pong), table football (foosball), table shuffleboard, air hockey, or billiards (pool). Custom tables for casino games such as poker, blackjack, and craps are also common. Other games include dart boards and arcade games such as pinball and video games. More substantial game rooms may have mini bowling lanes, indoor golf simulators, and other specialty amenities.

=== Food and drink ===
Refrigerators, microwave ovens, wet bars, popcorn makers, ice cream makers, and soda fountains can sometimes be found in recreation rooms.

== See also ==
- Den (room)
- Home cinema
- Great room
- Living room
- Man cave
