= Inglenook =

Architectural feature

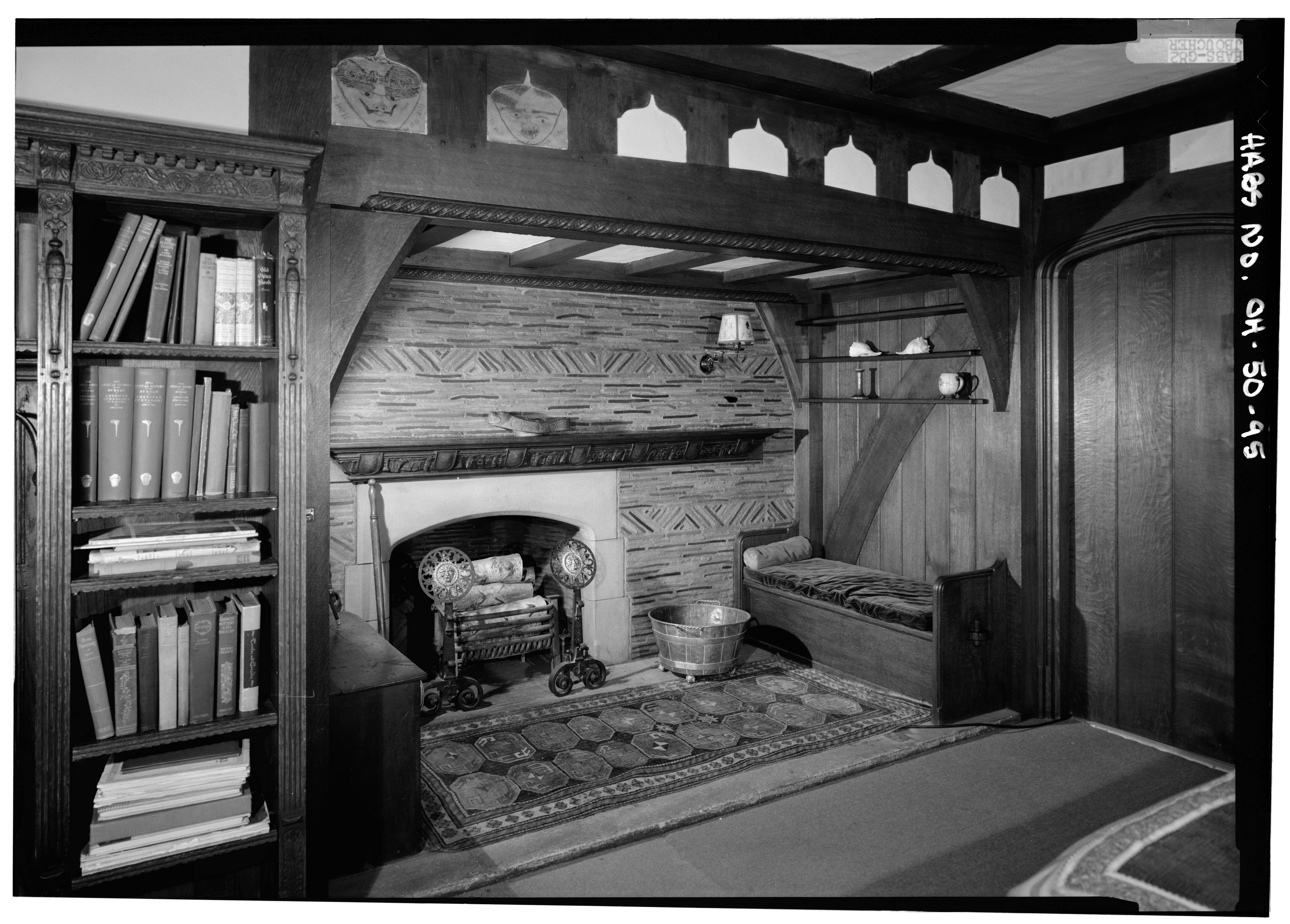
Inglenook in the Blue Bedroom of Stan Hywet Hall, Summit County, Ohio

An inglenook or chimney corner is a recess that adjoins a fireplace. The term "inglenook" comes from "ingle", an old Scots word (derived from the Gaelic aingeal) for a domestic fire, and "nook".

The inglenook originated as a partially enclosed hearth area, appended to a larger room. The hearth was used for cooking, and its enclosing alcove became a natural place for people seeking warmth to gather. With changes in building design, kitchens became separate rooms, while inglenooks were retained in the living space as intimate warming places – subsidiary spaces within larger rooms.

Inglenooks were prominent features of shingle-style architecture and characteristic of Arts and Crafts architecture, but began to disappear with the advent of central heating. Prominent American architects who employed the feature included Greene and Greene, Henry Hobson Richardson, and Frank Lloyd Wright. British architect Richard Norman Shaw significantly influenced Richardson. Adolf Loos introduced inglenooks to Viennese homes in his effort to promote Anglo-American domestic culture.

== See also ==
- Keeping room
