= Poème de l'amour et de la mer =

1882-1892 song cycle for voice and orchestra by Ernest Chausson

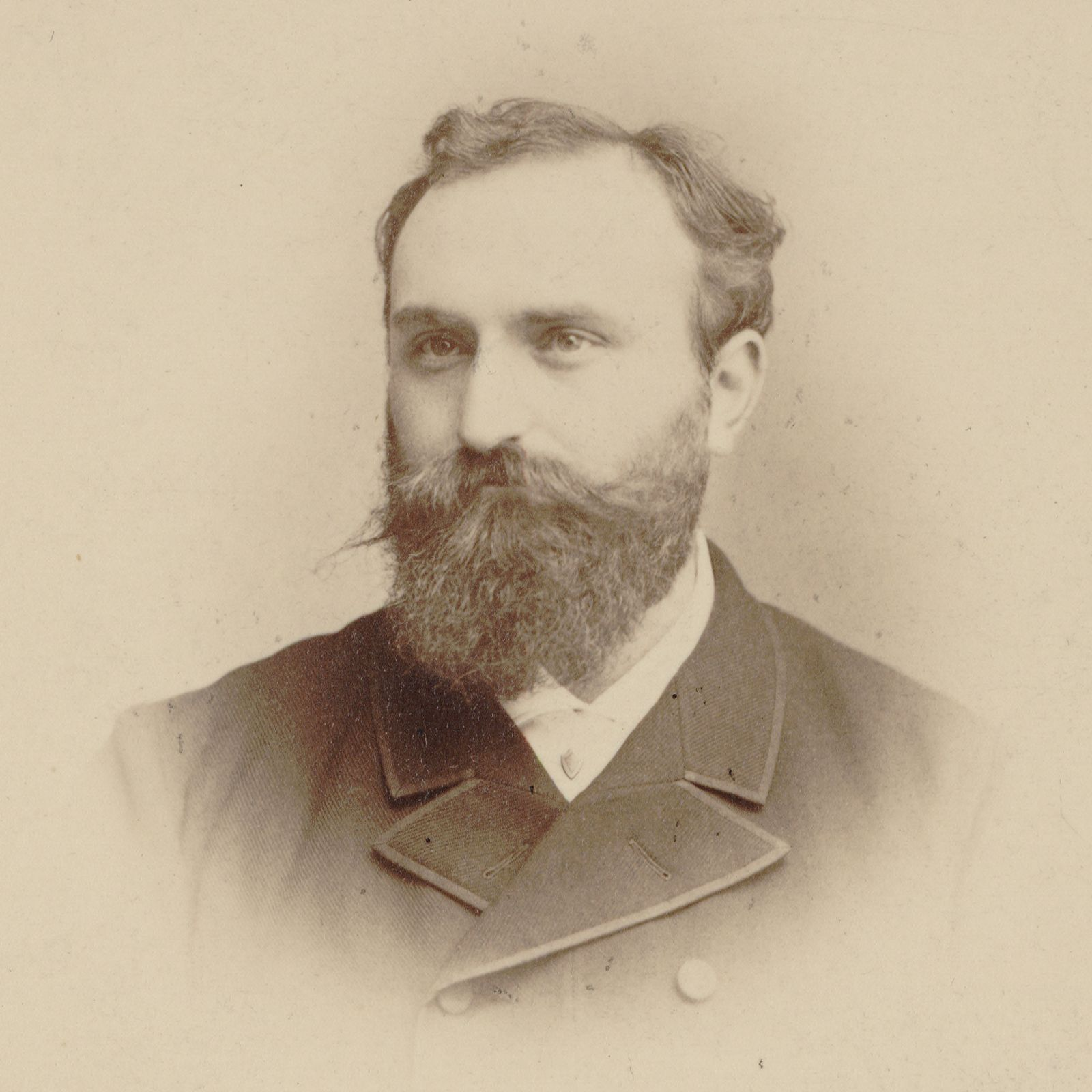
Ernest Chausson, ca. 1885

The Poème de l'amour et de la mer (literally, Poem of Love and the Sea), Op. 19, is a song cycle for voice and orchestra by Ernest Chausson. It was composed over an extended period between 1882 and 1892 and dedicated to Henri Duparc. Chausson would write another major work in the same genre, the Chanson perpétuelle, in 1898.

The Poème consists of two parts separated by an orchestral interlude, based on the poems La Fleur des eaux (The Flower of the Waters) and La Mort de l'amour (The Death of Love) by Chausson's friend Maurice Bouchor (1855–1929). (The last 10 lines of Chausson's La Fleur des eaux do not appear be by Bouchor, and their source is unclear.) Bouchor also provided the lyrics for another fifteen mélodies by Chausson. One such song was Le Temps des lilas (The Time of Lilacs), the last four verses of which Chausson transcribed and incorporated into the ending of the second part of the Poème.

At the premiere on February 21, 1893, in Brussels, Chausson himself played the piano to accompany the tenor Désiré Demest. The orchestral version was first performed on April 8 the same year by the soprano Éléonore Blanc and the Orchestre de la Société Nationale de Musique, conducted by Gabriel Marie. The piece typically takes just under 30 minutes to perform.

The first complete recording of Poème de l'amour et de la mer was made by soprano Verna Osborne in 1956 but with the pianist Robert Vetlesen rather than an orchestra accompaniment.
