= Immanuel Presbyterian Church (Los Angeles, California) =

Los Angeles Historic-Cultural Monument

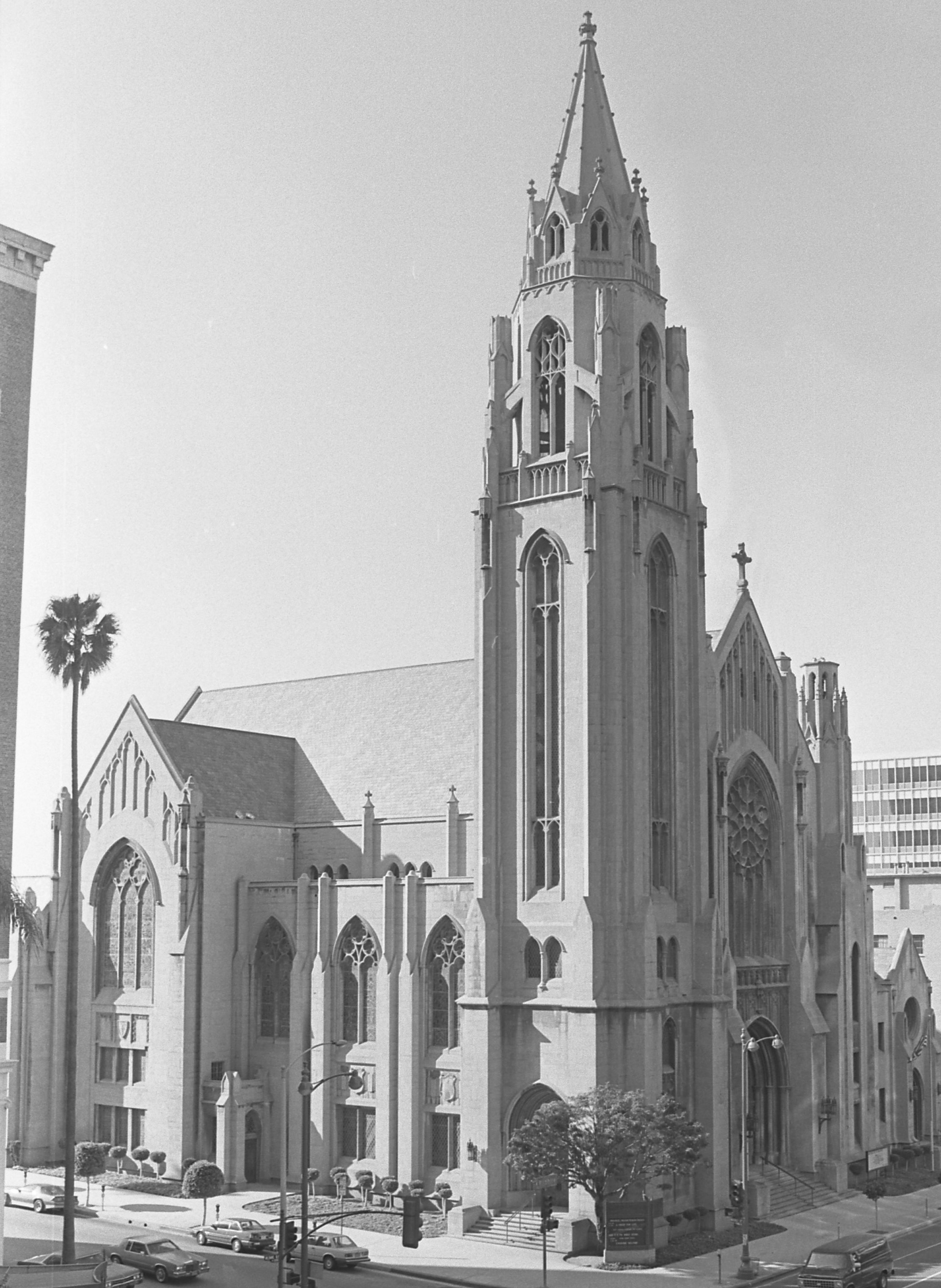
- Immanuel Presbyterian Church in 1987
- Immanuel Presbyterian Church
- 34.06145°N 118.2945°W
- Location: 3300 Wilshire Boulevard, Los Angeles, CA 90010
- Country: United States
- Denomination: Presbyterian Church (USA)
- Website: www.immanuelpres.org

History
- Status: Church
- Founded: 1888

Architecture
- Functional status: Active
- Heritage designation: Los Angeles Historic-Cultural Monument No. 743
- Designated: February 4, 2003
- Architect: Chauncey Fitch Skilling
- Style: French Gothic Revival
- Completed: 1929

Specifications
- Height: 205 ft (62 m) (tower)

Immanuel Presbyterian Church is a church in Los Angeles, California. The congregation was established in 1888 in downtown Los Angeles as a spinoff from the existing First Presbyterian Church, also then located in downtown. The church's current building was completed in 1929, and is located on Wilshire Boulevard in what is now the Koreatown district of Los Angeles. The church was listed as a Los Angeles Historic-Cultural Monument on February 4, 2003.

== Building ==
The church was designed by Los Angeles architect Chauncey Fitch Skilling, in what architectural critic Sam Hall Kaplan described as "a splendid example of the soaring French Gothic Revival style, with an exterior marked by a stained-glass rose window above the entry and an interior of beam trusses, columns and arches, a carved wood pulpit, chandeliers and oak furnishings." The building is distinguished by its 205 foot tall corner tower and traditionally-decorated stained glass made by the Dixon Art Glass company, as well as more contemporary glass designs from Judson Studios.

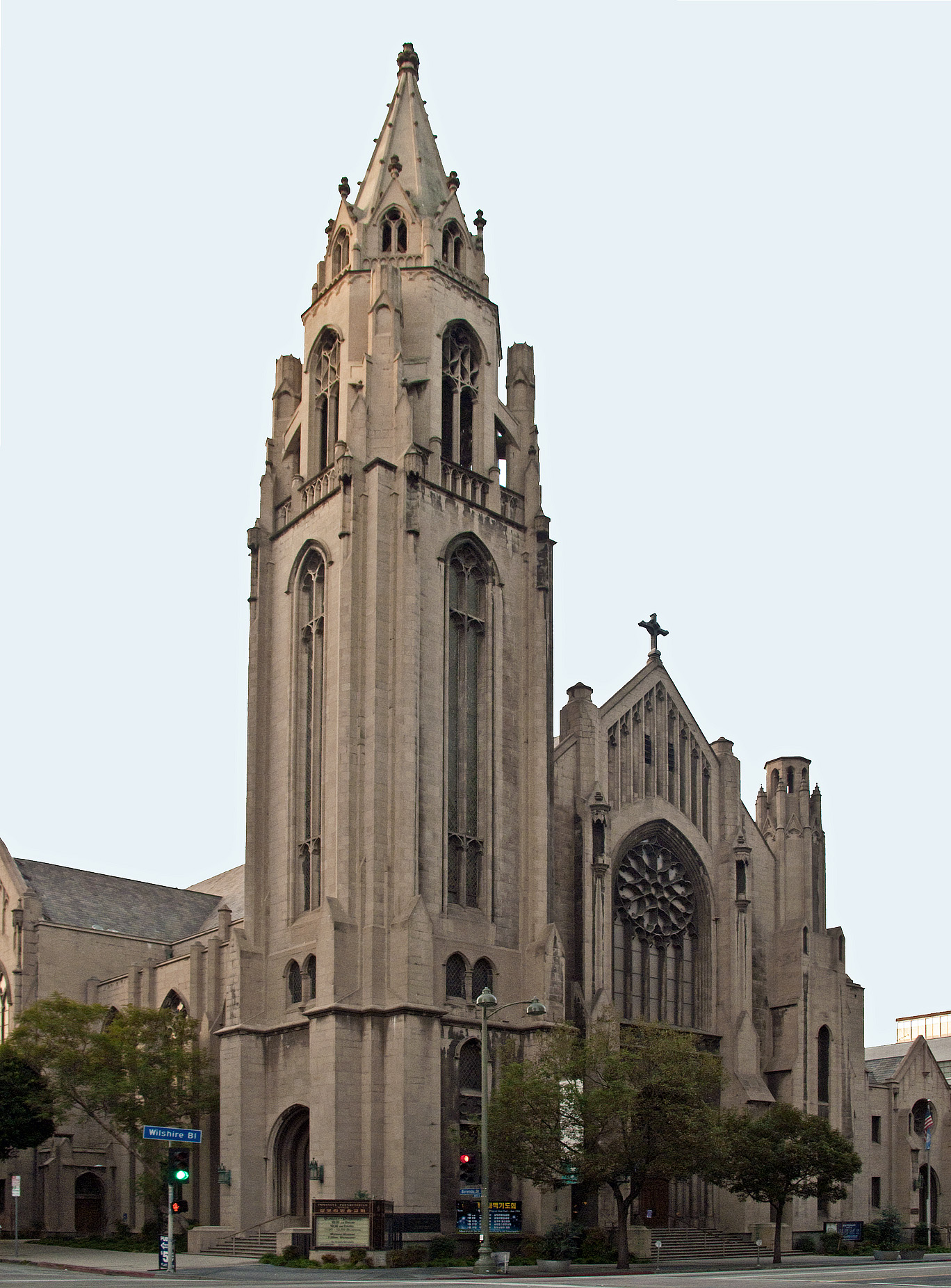

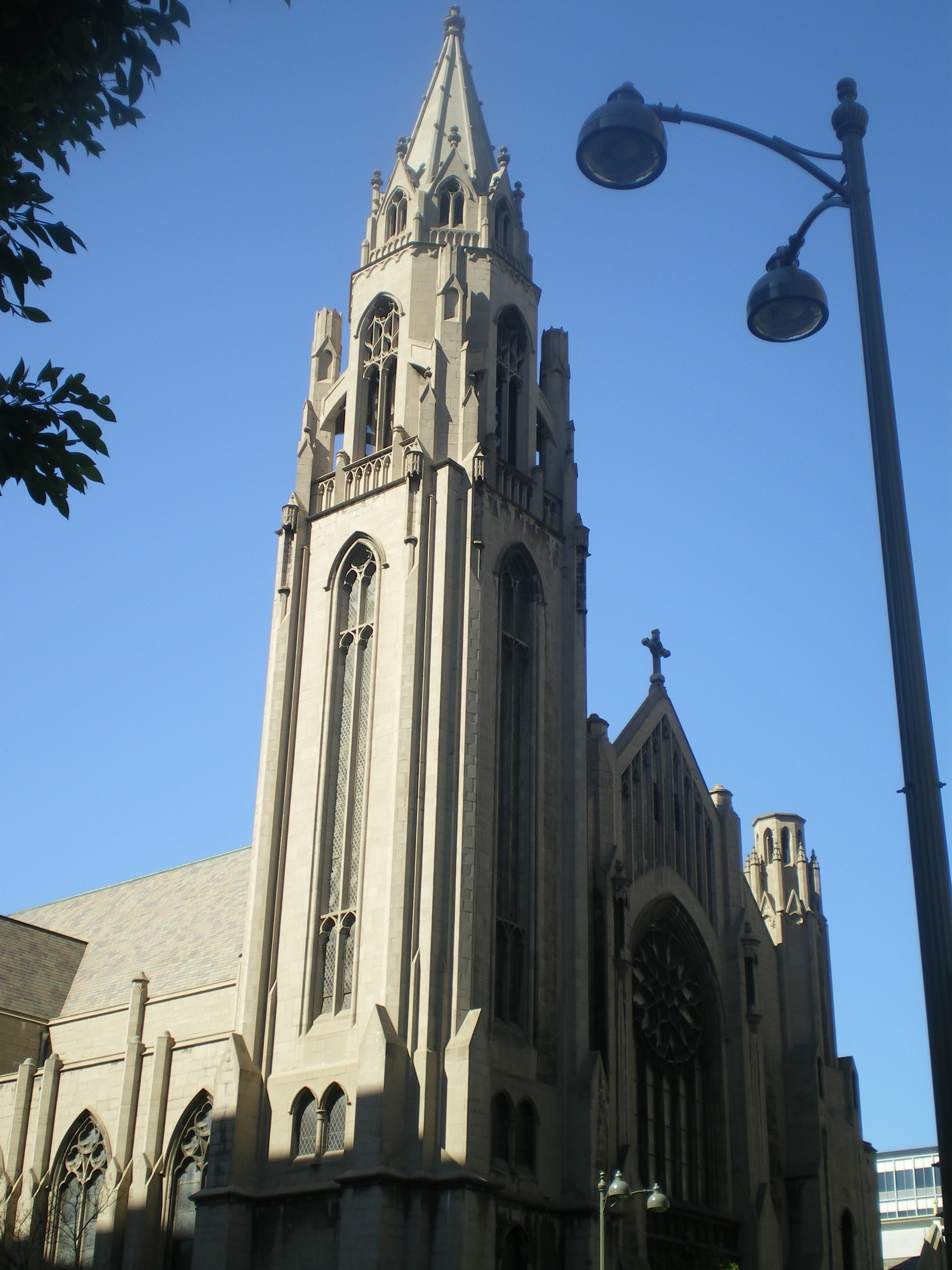

== Ministry ==
The current church building is one of the very large churches that were erected along Wilshire Boulevard in the 1920s to serve their largely wealthy, overwhelmingly white congregations. At its peak in 1943, Immanuel Presbyterian had 4,300 members making use of its 200 rooms, athletic facilities, art and performance studios, seven meeting halls, kitchen, dining room, and 2,000-seat sanctuary. William S. Meyer, who was pastor of the church from 1950 until his retirement in 1974, was credited with keeping membership around the 4,000 level during his tenure, even as other nearby churches declined in the wake of neighborhood changes, but by 1987 membership had fallen to about 800. The church has continued its efforts to address the diverse and changing nature of its neighborhood; for example, Frank Alton, who was pastor from 1995 to 2010, drew attention for his willingness in 2001 to allow a Salvadoran Catholic group to display a life-size statue of Jesus at the church, despite the traditional Presbyterian aversion to religious icons. Immanuel initiated worship services in Spanish in 1995, and later was noted for its pioneering efforts in conducting bilingual services, rather than separate services for each language group in the congregation.

In 1908, Dr. Hugh K. Walker of Immanuel Presbyterian Church gave the dedication sermon for Westminster Presbyterian Church (Los Angeles), believed to be the first African American Presbyterian congregation on the West Coast, according to the Los Angeles Times.

== Film and performance venue ==
The church was the filming location for the 2005 music video for "Helena (So Long and Goodnight)" by My Chemical Romance, from the second studio album Three Cheers for Sweet Revenge directed by Marc Webb. It later served as a filming location for Webb's 2012 film The Amazing Spider-Man. Other films using the church as a location have included Sister Act 2, Legally Blonde 2, and John Wick. In 2010 it was the location for a video production of the Billy Steinberg-Tom Kelly song "True Colors" (originally popularized by Cyndi Lauper), performed by the Gay Men's Chorus of Los Angeles and others in support of the anti-bullying It Gets Better Project.

The church's sanctuary is used as a concert venue for performances ranging from liturgical dramas to artists such as Ray LaMontagne, Conor Oberst, Hozier, Jenny Lewis, and Echo & The Bunnymen.

The soprano Verna Osborne worked for the church as a resident paid vocalist during the late 1930s.
