= Verna Osborne =

American soprano and voice teacher

Verna Osborne, in the 1930s

Verna Osborne (May 12, 1903 – April 7, 2006) was an American soprano and voice teacher. Born Verna MacMahan (also spelled MacMahon) in Brooklyn, she adopted the name of Verna Osborne after beginning her career as a concert pianist in the early 1920s at the age of 18. She trained as a soprano under Estelle Liebling and by 1923 she was working as a singer on the radio in New York City. She was principally a radio vocalist in New York for the next thirteen years, working primarily for the WEAF (now WFAN) and WOR radio stations, notably having her own program on the latter station from 1933 to 1936. She made her debut on the concert stage in 1934 at New York City's Town Hall.

By 1937 Osborne had relocated to Los Angeles where she worked as a radio and church vocalist. In May 1938 she joined NBC Radio in San Francisco where she had her own program that aired three times a week in the late 1930s. She lived in the San Francisco region for the rest of her life. As a performer she is best remembered for her work singing with the San Francisco Opera (SFO) from 1940 to 1943 and as a frequent soloist with the San Francisco Symphony during the 1940s and early 1950s. After this period her professional engagements decreased as she dedicated her time more and more to teaching. She did on occasion continue to work professionally, and as late as 1967 appeared in concert at a music festival held at Carolands. During her early teaching career she was active as a recitalist and performed at amateur community events during the 1950s and 1960s. Her voice is preserved on recordings made for Hargail Records and the Music Library record label.

In c. 1949 Osborne began a more than five-decade-long teaching career in the San Francisco region. She worked as a voice teacher in Marin County, California, for a variety of different schools and also out of a private studio. In 1957 she was appointed head of the opera department at the Peninsula Conservatory of Music, an institution she taught at until at least 1974. She was also an adjunct member of the voice faculty at the University of California, Berkeley, teaching at their extension campus in San Francisco. She retired from teaching around 2004 at the age of 101. She died in 2006 at the age of 102.

== Early life, education, and career in New York ==
Verna Osborne was born in Brooklyn, New York, on May 12, 1903. Her parents were Vernon Hawthorne MacMahon and Caroline Elizabeth MacMahon (née Birdwell). Her birth name was Verna MacMahan; she adopted the name Verna Osborne when she began her performance life as a concert pianist in the 1920s. She was 18 years old when she began performing professionally. She married John Daniel, a West Point graduate, at the Church of the Pilgrims (Brooklyn, New York) on June 2, 1927. The marriage lasted for only a brief period.

Osborne studied singing with Estelle Liebling, the voice teacher of Beverly Sills, in New York City. She began her vocal career as a radio singer, appearing as early as June 1923 in a program of coloratura soprano arias on WEAF (now WFAN) in New York City. She continued to perform intermittently on WFAN in New York City through 1935. She had her own regular radio program on WOR, Verna Osborne, Songs, from 1933 to 1936.

Osborne gave a concert of coloratura soprano arias at The Town Hall in New York City on April 8, 1935, with the Musical America reviewer noting that she had appeared in recital once before at that venue in 1934. Her repertoire included Zerbinetta's aria "Großmächtige Prinzessin" from Richard Strauss's Ariadne auf Naxos and Mozart's concert aria "Ch'io mi scordi di te?". In August 1935 she was a soloist with the Chicago Symphony Orchestra for a special radio concert featuring the orchestra on WOR. In January 1936 she appeared on CKLW radio.

== Los Angeles soprano ==
In June 1936, Osborne traveled to Los Angeles, California, for the first time to perform as a guest artist in a concert of soprano arias broadcast on KHJ radio with an orchestra led by conductor Frederick Stark. Stark later worked frequently as a conductor and orchestrator for The Walt Disney Company, notably serving as an orchestrator for Bambi and as conductor for Sleeping Beauty. Osborne performed as a guest soloist again under Stark in August 1936 in a program with tenor Luther King. By 1937, she had moved to Los Angeles where she was a paid soprano soloist at Immanuel Presbyterian Church.

In July 1937 Osborne became a resident soprano at KFWB radio. Her first broadcast was on the program Ask Mr. Hollywood. On that program she performed songs from Sigmund Romberg's The New Moon with baritone Paul Keast and Leon Leonardi's orchestra which was recorded live at a concert in Los Angeles. It was also broadcast on CBS Radio. She then became a regular singer of the program Can You Write A Song which was hosted by the composer Norman Spencer. The program featured new songs by non-professionals who were competing for prize money. These tunes were sung by Osborne and other resident KFWB singers with Leonardi and his orchestra accompanying. Her older brother, Lieutenant Donald Swain MacMahon, and his family were with her in California in November 1937.

== San Francisco soprano and career peak ==
=== Early to mid 1940s ===
Osborne decided to move to San Francisco in the late 1930s after enjoying a vacation to the city. In April 1938 she appeared as a guest artist on a program co-broadcast by KWG (AM) and KGO (AM) that featured her singing arias by George Gershwin and Victor Herbert with an orchestra led by Ernest-Gill Plamondon. In May 1938 she joined NBC Radio in San Francisco where she had her own radio program that aired three times a week.

In December 1938 Osborne was soprano soloist in Handel's Messiah with the Pacific Philharmonic Chorus at the Kaiser Convention Center (then known as the Oakland Auditorium) in Oakland, California. She later returned to Oakland in 1939 to perform the death scene from Massenet's Thaïs and the prayer and barcarolle from Meyerbeer's L'étoile du nord with the Oakland Symphony.

Osborne was a protégé of the San Francisco Symphony (SFS) conductor Pierre Monteux and was a frequent soloist with the orchestra in the 1940s. She made her debut with the orchestra in February 1940 as the soprano soloist in Ravel's Shéhérazade with Monteux conducting. On March 1, 1940, she was the soprano soloist in Verdi's Requiem with the SFS under Monteux. She later sang the Requiem again with the orchestra in 1947 with her fellow soloists including mezzo Herta Glaz, tenor Carl Hague, and baritone Perry Askam.

In October 1940 Osborne made her opera debut as Micaëla in Bizet's Carmen at the San Francisco Opera with Marjorie Lawrence in the title role, Ezio Pinza as Escamillo, Raoul Jobin as Don José, and Gaetano Merola conducting. She remained with the company for the next two seasons performing the roles of Konstanze in Mozart's Die Entführung aus dem Serail (1941) and Siebel in Gounod's Faust (1942). For her fourth and final season with the SFO she performed the part of Musetta in Puccini's La bohème in the fall of 1943 for performances in San Francisco, Sacramento, and at the Shrine Auditorium in Los Angeles with Licia Albanese as Mimi and Frank Valentino as Marcello. The critic for Musical America wrote, "New to the part of Musetta was Verna Osborne, who scored a definite success by her good singing and good acting, proving the best of the many sopranos who have made debuts in the role with the San Francisco company."

In July 1942 Osborne starred in a production of Mozart's Der Schauspieldirektor at the Carmel Bach Festival. In December 1942 she performed a concert of arias with the Modesto Symphony Orchestra—among them "Caro nome che il mio cor" from Rigoletto. In June 1943 she gave a recital in San Francisco with the pianist Carl Fuerstner as her accompanist. In August 1943 she performed in concert with the Budapest String Quartet in San Francisco. In October 1943 she starred in a production of Cimarosa's Il matrimonio segreto in Los Angeles with Walter Herbert conducting, a work which the group also performed in San Francisco.

In March 1944 Osborne was a semi-finalist in the Metropolitan Opera Auditions of the Air competition. In April 1944 she reprised the role of Musetta with the San Carlo Opera Company at the Center Theatre in New York City, and with the Washington Opera Company at Constitution Hall in Washington, D.C. She was contracted for more performances with the latter company for the 1944–1945 season. In July 1944 she starred in a production of Sigmund Romberg's as Barbara Frietchie in My Maryland at the Iroquois Amphitheatre in Louisville, Kentucky. A bad storm during a performance knocked down scenery which fell on Osborne. She was seriously injured, fracturing both her ankles and vertebrae, and was ultimately awarded $6,000.00 in a court judgement after the accident.

=== Late 1940s and 1950s ===
At the time of her career peak in the 1940s, Osborne was recognized for her good looks as a "tall, striking strawberry blonde". A 1947 review by San Francisco News critic Herb Caen described her as "one of the natural beauties of San Francisco" and her singing voice as possessing "an exquisite ethereal quality which delighted the ears." In November 1949 she performed the role of Violetta in Verdi's La traviata with Arturo Casiglia's Pacific Opera Company (POC) in San Francisco. The following month she performed the role of Marguerite in Faust with the POC under the baton of Gastone Usigli with David Poleri in the title role.

Osborne's obituary in the San Francisco Chronicle provided quotes of positive reviews of her performances in London (The Times of London), Paris (L'Aube), and Zurich (Die Tat), but it did not provide the date of publications or give details of the performances other than to say the London performance occurred in 1947. The same obituary stated she abruptly stopped performing in 1949 after giving a benefit concert at the Academy of Music in San Francisco for an unknown reason.

Despite the account given in her obituary, newspaper and magazine articles indicate that Osborne did perform and make recordings into the mid-1950s, and made a professional appearance at a music festival as late as 1967 (see below). In the 1949–1950 season Osborne was a soloist with the San Francisco Symphony (SFS). In September 1949 she performed a concert of music by Henry Purcell and Daniel Pinkham in San Francisco as part of the Festival of Songs in English (FSE) concert series sponsored by the Campion Society. Pinkham dedicated his song cycle Slow, Slow, Fresh Fount (1949) to her. She was one of the featured soloists at the FSE again in 1951, performing the United States premiere of Michael Tippett's song cycle The Heart's Assurance and Purcell's Sleep, Adam, sleep, and take thy rest. She performed yet again at the FSE in 1953, performing works by San Francisco composer John Edmunds and appearing as the soprano soloist in the cantata Didone by Benedetto Marcello.

In December 1950 Osborne was the soprano soloist in Bach's Magnificat with the SFS. In January 1951 she starred in a concert version of Strauss's Elektra given by the SFS with Astrid Varnay in the title role and Dimitri Mitropoulos conducting. She also appeared in operas with the Pacific Opera Company in the 1950–1951 season, including the role of Micaëla in Carmen in December 1950.

In November 1957 she performed several opera arias during a holiday benefit concert at Carolands in Hillsborough, California. She later gave a recital at Carolands in 1967 as part of the music festival organized by the Pacific Musical Society.

== Recordings ==
With Lukas Foss as her accompanist, Osborne recorded Darius Milhaud's Cinq Chansons for Hargail Records in 1946. She was the first singer to record the entire song cycle Poème de l'amour et de la mer by Ernest Chausson, although other singers had already recorded individual songs from that work. That recording was made for the Music Library record label and released in 1953. Rather that having a full orchestra as originally written, it was made with the pianist Robert Vetlesen. Osborne and Vetlesen collaborated on another Music Library record, recording Claude Debussy's Proses Lyriques and Gabriel Fauré's Seven Songs. It was released in 1956.

== Teaching career and later life ==
In c. 1949 Osborne began working as a voice teacher in Marin County, California, ultimately becoming a celebrated singing teacher in the San Francisco region where she taught for more than five decades. By 1951 she was teaching on the voice faculty of the San Francisco Academy of Music (SFAM) and at the Tamalpais School for Boys in San Rafael, California. She directed an SFAM production of La boheme that was staged in August 1951. In 1954 she sang a recital of rare French chansons at Wheeler Hall at the University of California where she was also teaching as a guest lecturer at the time of her performance. A review of that recital noted that she was then president of the SFAM.

In 1954 Osborne gave a recital sponsored by the San Francisco Musical Club (SFMC), an organization supporting amateur community music programming opportunities. She sang in a concert with that organization in 1955. In 1956 she was the musical director for an amateur production of Carmen staged by the SFMC, and the following year directed productions of Christoph Willibald Gluck's Orfeo ed Euridice and Gounod's Faust with the same organization. She continued to stage a variety of different opera workshop programs with SFMC into the 1960s, including singing the part of Tosca herself in 1961 and later the role of Verdi's Violetta in 1965. In 1960 she was elected President of the SFMC, and re-elected in 1961.

In 1957 Osborne was appointed the head of the opera department at the Peninsula Conservatory of Music (PCM) in Burlingame, California, a role she was still in as late as 1968. She was still on the voice faculty of the PCM as late as 1974. She also taught concurrently at the Marin Academy of Music. In 1962 she directed the PCM's production of Gilbert and Sullivan's H.M.S. Pinafore. In 1964 she worked as a stage director for the East Bay Opera League, directing a production of Louise. In 1966 she reprised her earlier French language recital program given at the University of California at the PCM. By 1968 she was teaching voice on the adjunct faculty of the University of California, Berkeley, (UCB) at their extension campus in San Francisco in addition to working at the PCM. She was still teaching at UCB as late as 1974. She gave a series of opera workshops sponsored by the San Francisco Opera during their 1969–1970 season.

Friends of Osborne during her time working as a voice teacher stated that she did not like to talk about her performance career and was a person who preferred to live life in the present and discuss the now rather than the past. She was known for maintaining her reddish blonde hair which she continued to dye up until right before her death. In her old age she looked and acted like a much younger person. She traveled to Bangkok to celebrate her 92nd birthday, and she celebrated her 96th birthday with a tea at the Waldorf Astoria New York and by attending multiple Broadway shows.

In 2003 Osborne celebrated her 100th birthday at which she sang the aria "Summertime" from Gershwin's Porgy and Bess after being prompted to do so by the composer Gordon Getty who was one of her former voice students and had known Osborne for decades. It was her last public performance, and she received a standing ovation. She continued to give voice lessons until her retirement at the age of 101.

Osborne died at the age of 102 on April 7, 2006, following an episode of pneumonia. In a 2006 interview made shortly before her death she said that her biggest regret was that she never learned to play golf.
