= Den (room) =

Room where people can pursue activities in private

A large den for casual entertaining and watching television

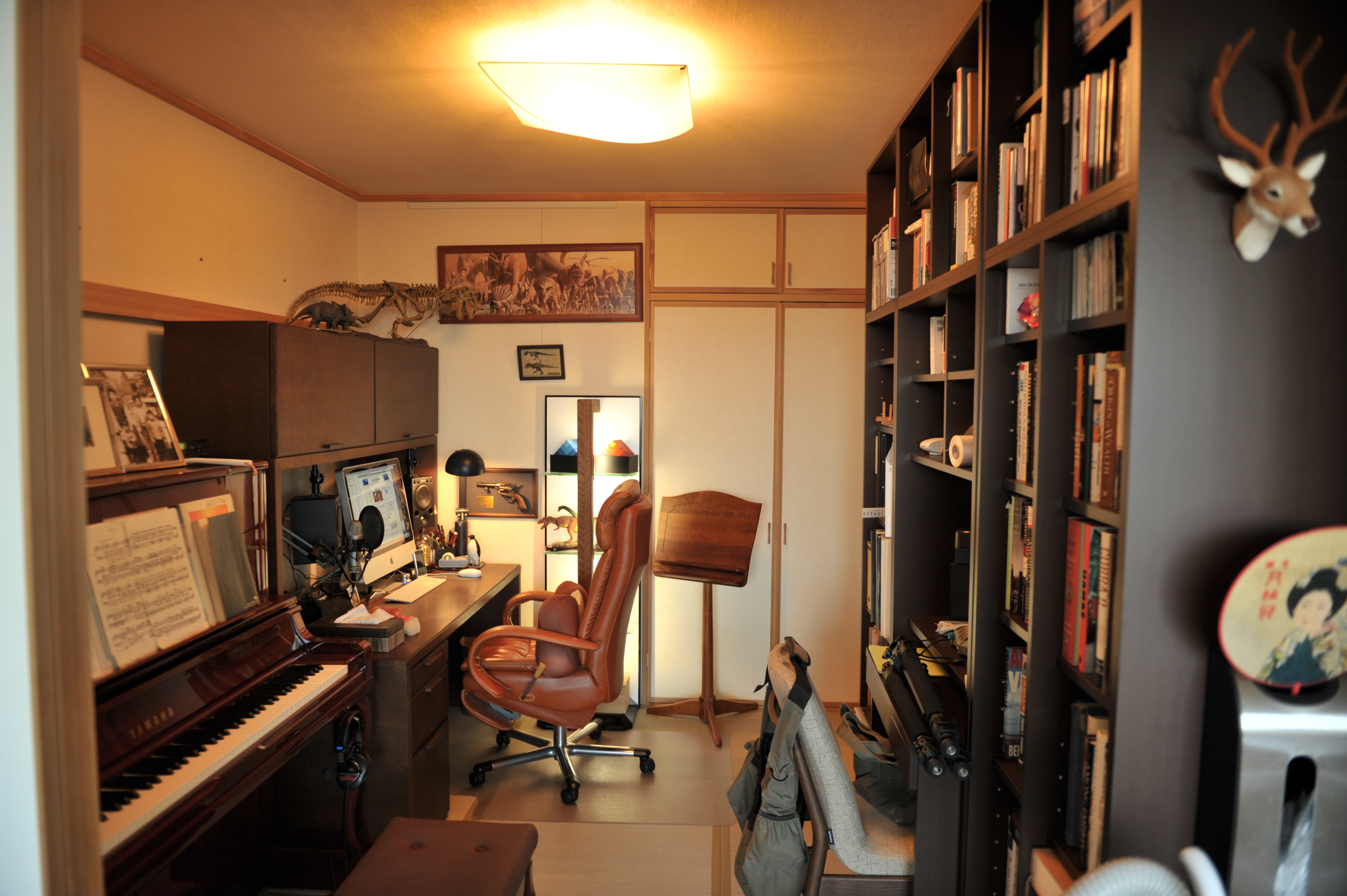
A small "man cave" den used as a study

A den is a small room in a house where people can pursue activities in private.

In North America, the type of rooms described by the term den varies considerably by region. It is used to describe many different kinds of bonus rooms, including family rooms, libraries, home cinemas, spare bedrooms, studies or retreats.

The etymology of "den" stems from an animal's den, such as the American black bear, among others.

In some places, particularly in parts of the British Isles, a small den may be known as a snug.

In real estate, a den is often classified as a flexible space that can serve multiple purposes, such as a home office, guest room, or additional living area. While it lacks the official designation of a bedroom due to size restrictions or the absence of a window, a den can add significant value to a property. Many modern condominiums and apartments include dens as a way to offer extra functional space without increasing the number of bedrooms in the listing.

While living rooms tend to be used for entertaining company on formal occasions, dens, like other family rooms, tend to lean toward the more informal. In houses that do not have dedicated family rooms or recreation rooms, a den may fill that niche. Dens can also be private areas primarily used by adult members of the household, possibly restricting access to the room by their children. Dens with home theatre systems and large screen televisions may be referred to as media rooms instead.

Dens can serve the same purpose as cabinets in the past, becoming a modern man cave – a place for men to gather and entertain. In such cases, the design and decor may be distinctively masculine.
