= Family room =

Room in a house designed for group gatherings

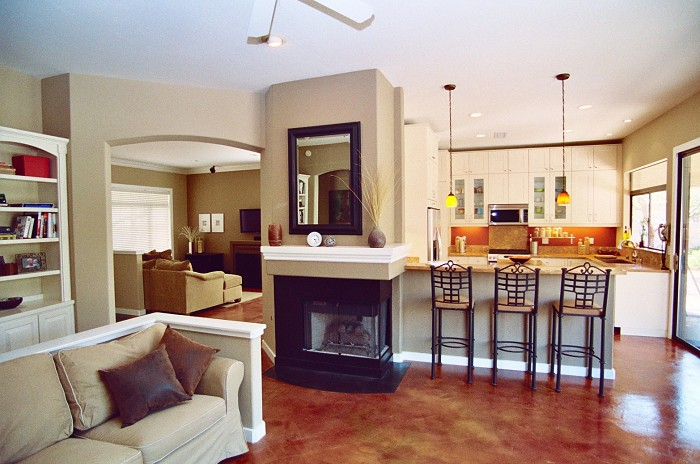
Family room in Arizona.

A family room is an informal, all-purpose room in a house. The family room is designed to be a place where family and guests gather for group recreation like talking, reading, watching TV, and other family activities. Often, the family room is located adjacent to the kitchen, and at times, flows into it with no visual breaks. A family room often has doors leading to the back yard and specific outdoor living areas such as a deck, garden, or terrace.

The term family room is defined in the 1945 book Tomorrow's House by George Nelson and Henry Wright. Chapter 7, entitled "The Room Without a Name" spoke of the need in modern life for a new "biggest room in the house" that would serve the social and recreational needs of the entire family, allowing activities that would not be permitted in the living room.

This "big room" would have furnishings and materials that were "tough", for hard use, and it should be easy to clean. In contrast with the existing "rumpus rooms" of the time, it would occasionally serve for slightly more formal entertainment, so it should be a handsome room and should have cupboards where toys, tools, etc. could be kept out of sight.

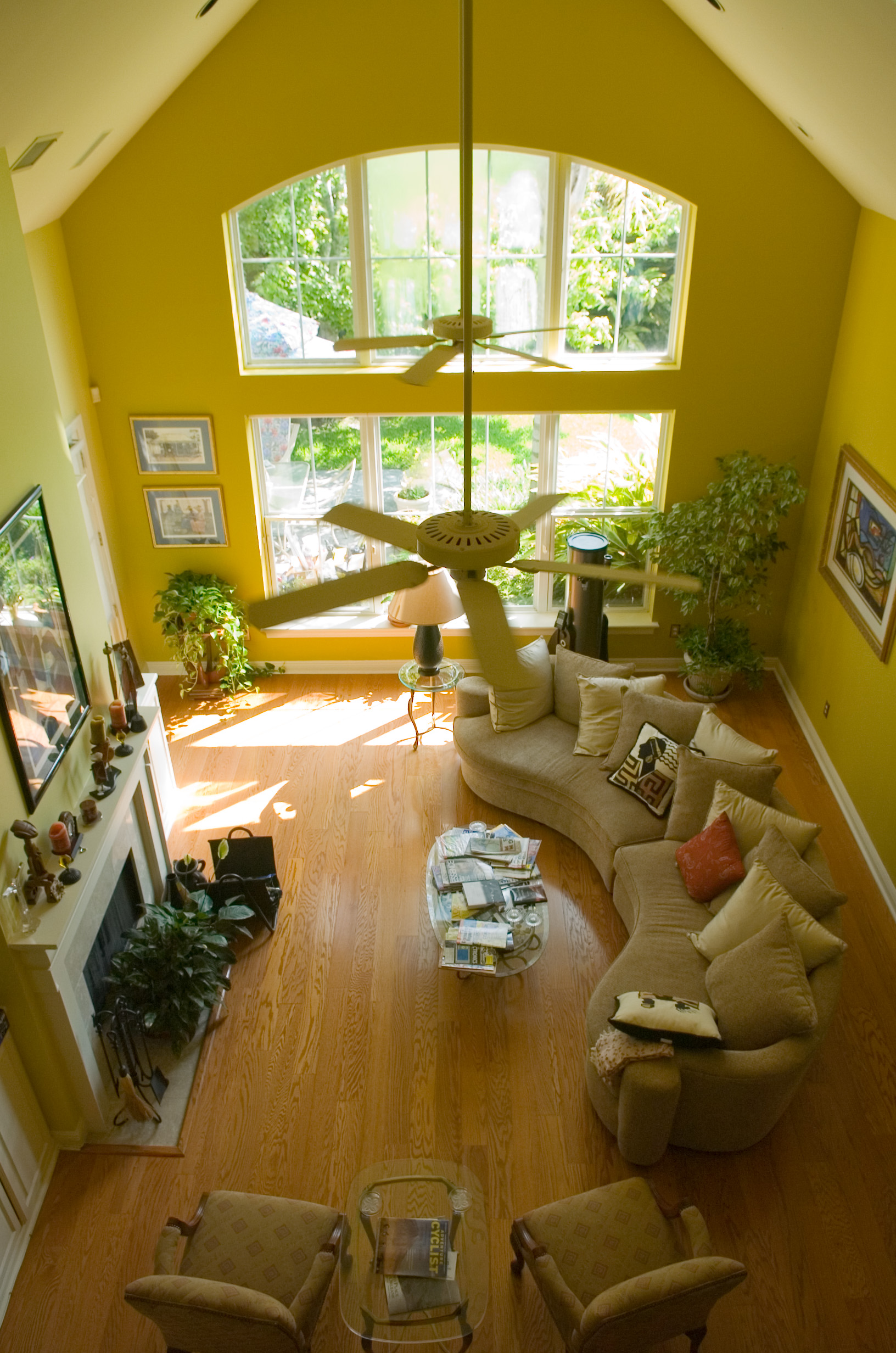
New Orleans living room with formal decorations

The distinction between a family room, living room, and recreation room is fluid, but can be classified according to three characteristics: location, function and design. Football games on large color televisions made family rooms large enough for parents and children more popular during the 1970s. In homes with more than one, the family room is less formal, both in function and furnishings and is located away from the main entrance, while the living room is usually the more formal, reserved for guests, special occasions and the display of items such as antiques or artwork. It is typically located in the central part of the house towards the front. The recreation room is typically in the basement and used for games and playtime.

In homes with only one, the terms are generally used interchangeably. In floorplans, a "great room" is where the living room and family room are combined into one high-ceilinged room adjacent to the kitchen.

== See also ==
- Parlour
- Den (room)
- Living room
- Recreation room
