= Study (room) =

Type of room in a house

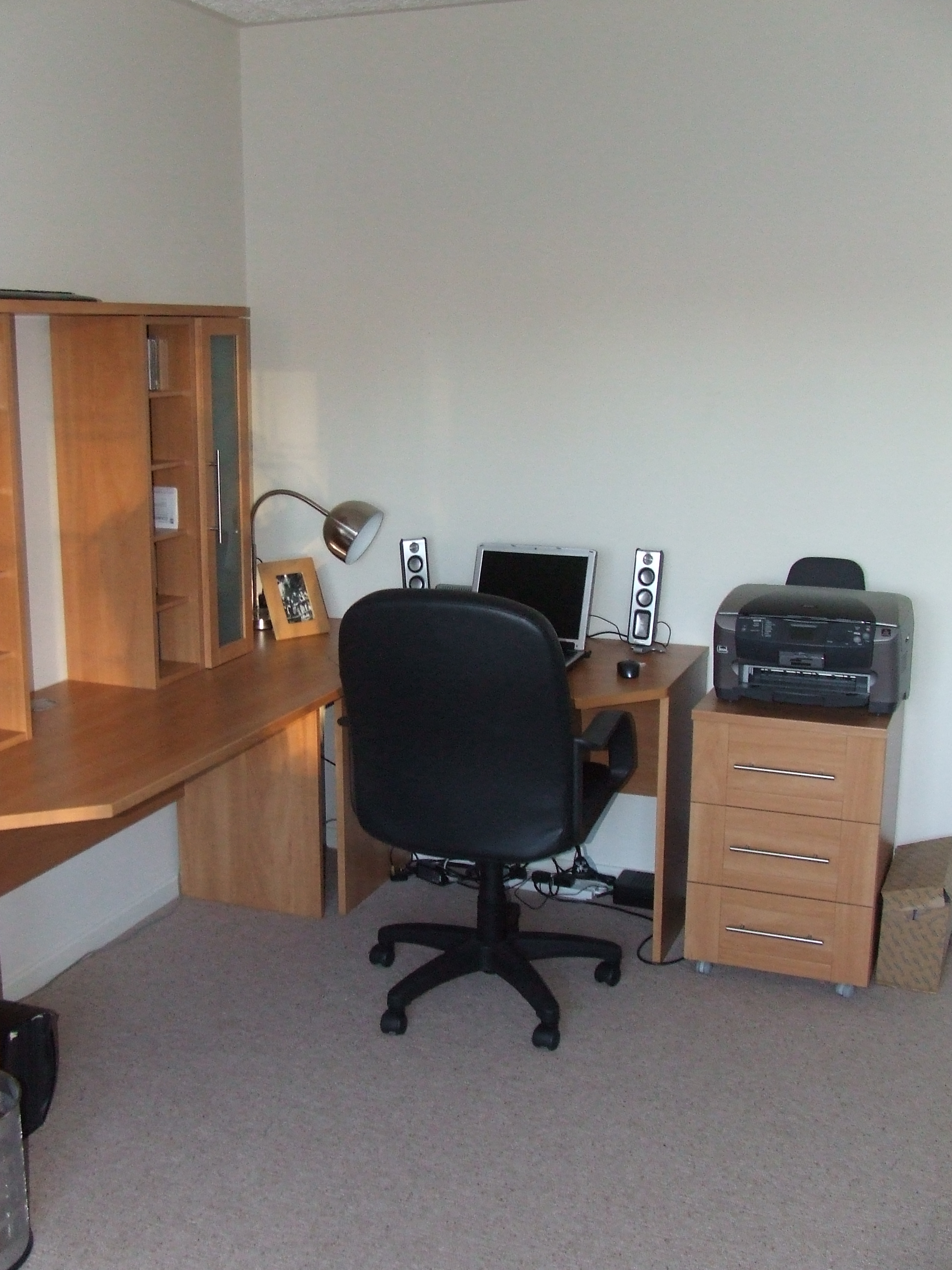
A modern home office

A study, also known as a home office, is a room in a house that is used for paperwork, computer work, or reading. Historically, the study of a house was reserved for use as the private office and reading room of a parent/guardian as the formal head of a household, but studies are today generally used to operate a home business or open to the whole family.

== History ==
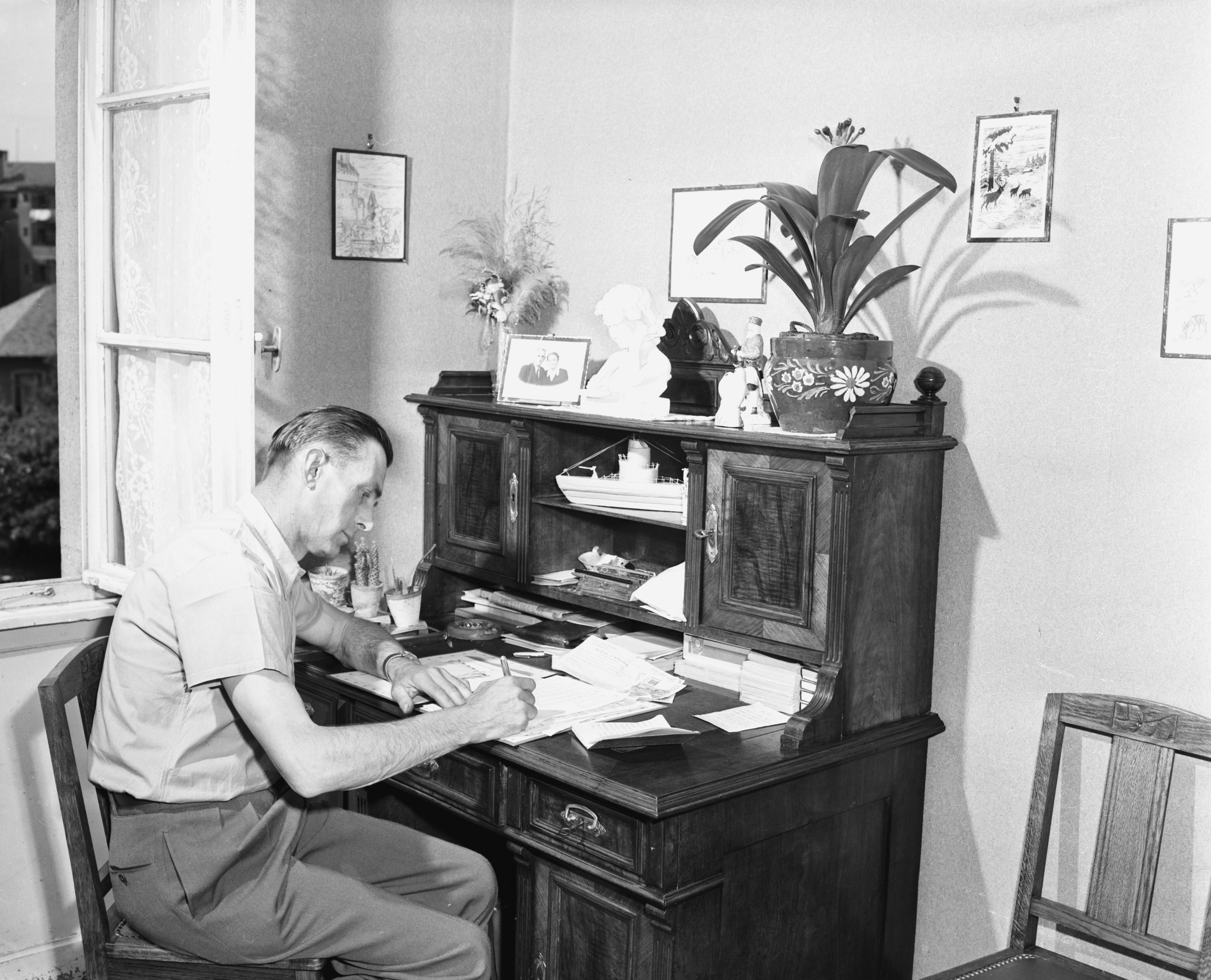
Working at home in France, ca. 1950s

The study developed from the closet or cabinet of the Renaissance era. From the beginning of the 18th century onwards, increased literacy at the middle-class family level led to the setting aside of closed study and library areas within larger houses. There, commercial work, reading, correspondence, fact-recording and other activities could be undertaken in privacy and silence. Until well into the 20th century, gender restrictions on social roles made the domestic study an essentially male facility. The 19th-century clergyman would prepare sermons and interview parishioners in his study, and his equally literate wife would undertake her social obligations in a nearby parlour.

The Internet has led to a transformation of the historic study with its localized functions into the present day home-office. The technological revolution has enabled individuals to engage in remote work while still being productive using the Internet, email, e-commerce, and videotelephony.

Government statistics record that in Britain 4.2 million people worked exclusively from home in 2014; an increase of 31% from the 1998 figure.
