= Cayetano Apablasa =

American politician (1847–1889)

- Apablasa c. 1885

Member of the Los Angeles Common Council for the 1st Ward
- In office December 3, 1877 – December 1878

Personal details
- Born: April 13, 1847 San Diego, California
- Died: November 14, 1889 (aged 42)
- Parent: María del Espíritu Santo Blanco (mother)

Cayetano Apablasa Blanco (or Apablaza; April 13, 1847 – November 14, 1889) was a 19th-century land owner and politician in Los Angeles, California. His holdings were on the south of the central Los Angeles Plaza, later the first site of the city's Chinatown and location of present-day Union Station.

== Personal ==
Apablasa was born April 13, 1847, in San Diego, California, the son of Juan Apablasa of Chile, who came to Mexican Alta California about 1839, and to Pueblo de Los Ángeles in 1843. His mother was María del Espíritu Santo Blanco. He had 7 siblings. Cayetano attended parochial schools.

He was married in Los Angeles to Concepcion. They had two sons and three daughters. The family home was in a seven-acre orchard near the Old Plaza.

He died on November 14, 1889, aged 42, several weeks after he was thrown from his horse in an accident. His widow married Ildefonso A. Sepulveda in 1892.

== Career ==
After he left school at age seventeen, he entered the Wilmington Shipbuilding Company in Wilmington and served there during the American Civil War, until 1869. After the war, he opened a blacksmithery or a wagon shop at 99 Alameda Street. His later activities involved the extensive real estate holdings of his family. In 1985 the Los Angeles Times noted that:

The family built what was believed to be the city's first frame house but it was moved in 1933 to make room for what was then Union Passenger Terminal, the nation's newest train depot when it opened in 1937–38. The Apablasa family was also responsible for Los Angeles' first subdivision, when late in the last century it sold land to Chinese residents who built the first Chinatown. An "Apablasa Street" once ran through the Chinese quarter.

=== Public service ===
Apablasa was elected to the Los Angeles Common Council on December 3, 1877, for a term ending in December 1878, representing the 1st Ward. He was a member of the police committee.

The Workingman's Party nominated him for the State Senate in 1880.
