= Arthur McKenzie Dodson =

American politician (1819–1874)

Member of the Los Angeles Common Council
- In office 1859–1860
- Preceded by: Geronimo Ybarra
- Succeeded by: Vincent A. Hoover
- In office 1861–1862
- Preceded by: Ezra Drown
- Succeeded by: James Brown Winston

Personal details
- Born: 1819 Philadelphia, Pennsylvania
- Died: 1874 (aged 54–55) Tucson, Arizona
- Resting place: Wilmington, Los Angeles
- Spouse: Reyes Dominguez

Arthur McKenzie Dodson (c. 1819 – c. 1874) was a member of the Los Angeles Common Council, the governing body of that city, from 1859 to 1862.

Dodson was born in Philadelphia, Pennsylvania, c. 1819.

== California ==
In 1849, he took part in the California Gold Rush, but had no luck and so settled in Los Angeles in 1850, where he set up a butcher shop and one of the first grocery stores in the Pueblo de Los Angeles. He was also the first soapmaker in Los Angeles. He was in partnership with John Benner. Dodson also established a coal and wood yard at the corner of Spring and Sixth streets, and he "started there a little community which he called Georgetown as a compliment to the famous Round House George[,] whose bakery, [...] was located on that corner."

Dodson was married in Los Angeles to Reyes Dominguez, the daughter of Nazario Dominguez, part owner of Rancho San Pedro. The couple had twelve children, of which "only four grew to maturity": James H., Emma, John F. and Caroline.

Dodson died in Tucson, Arizona, in 1874, and was buried in Wilmington, Los Angeles.
