= Frank Sabichi =

American politician

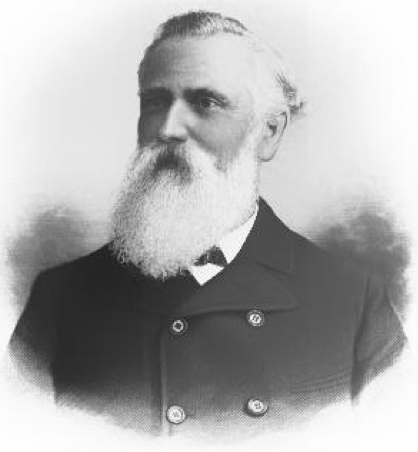

President of the Los Angeles Common Council
- In office December 5, 1872 – December 18, 1874
- Preceded by: H.K.S. O'Melveny
- Succeeded by: Prudent Beaudry

Member of the Los Angeles Common Council for the 3rd ward
- In office December 9, 1870 – December 18, 1874

Member of the Los Angeles Common Council for the 4th ward
- In office December 8, 1883 – December 9, 1884

Personal details
- Born: October 4, 1842 Pueblo de Los Ángeles, Alta California, Mexico
- Died: April 12, 1900 (aged 57) Los Angeles, California
- Party: Democratic
- Spouse: Magdalena Wolfskill (m. 1895)
- Children: 13
- Relatives: William Wolfskill (father-in-law)

Frank Sabichi (October 4, 1842 – April 12, 1900) was an attorney and developer of extensive properties who sat on the Los Angeles, California, Common Council, the legislative arm of that city, from 1870 to 1874 and again from 1897 to 1899. He was council president in 1873–74.

== Biography ==
Sabichi was born on October 4, 1842, to Mathias Sabichi of Austria and his Mexican wife in the Pueblo de Los Ángeles, then within Alta California, Mexico. At age eight, he was taken to England and placed at the Royal Naval Academy in Portsmouth, England. He saw service related to the Indian Rebellion of 1857 and the 1854–55 Siege of Sebastapol during the Crimean War.

He returned to Los Angeles, in the U.S. state of California, in 1860 at about age 18 and began the private study of law in the offices of Glassell, Smith & Patton. He practiced law for a time but gave it up to manage and develop his extensive land holdings. He was credited with opening and developing East 7th Street on his family properties. He was a charter member of the Pioneer Society of Southern California and the Native Sons of the Golden West.

A Catholic, Sabichi was married to Magdalena Wolfskill, the daughter of pioneer settler William Wolfskill, on May 4, 1865. They had thirteen children. Those who survived were Frank W., Agatha (Mrs. J. J. Fay), Joseph Rodney, George Carlos, William Wolfskill, Louis S., and Beatrice (Mrs. S. Mitchell).

Sabichi died at the age of fifty-eight on April 12, 1900, in his home at 2437 South Figueroa Street. A doctor in attendance said the cause was probably "due to a stroke of apoplexy."

=== Public service ===
Sabichi was elected to one-year terms in the Los Angeles Common Council in 1870 to 1874 and again from 1897 to 1899. He was council president in 1873–74, and he was on the city Fire Commission between 1897 and 1900.
