= Julian Chavez =

Julian Chavez may refer to:

- Julián A. Chávez, Hispano-Californio ranchero, landowner and public official
- Julian Chavez (soccer)
