= Bosbyshell =

Bosbyshell is a surname. Notable people with this surname include:

- Edward C. Bosbyshell (1822–1894), an American politician in Iowa and California
- Oliver Bosbyshell (1839–1921), American military officer and superintendent of the United States Mint in Philadelphia
