= Richard Molony =

Richard Molony may refer to:

- Richard S. Molony of Iowa, member of the U.S. House of Representatives
- Richard Molony (carriage maker) of Los Angeles, California
