= Albert Fenner Kercheval =

American writer and politician

Member of the Los Angeles Common Council for the 3rd Ward
- In office December 3, 1877 – December 6, 1878
- Preceded by: John H. Jones
- Succeeded by: Elisha K. Green

Personal details
- Born: March 16, 1829 Preble County, Ohio
- Died: January 24, 1893 (aged 63)

Albert Fenner Kercheval (March 16, 1829 in Preble County, Ohio – January 24, 1893) was a fruit grower and poet in Los Angeles County, California, and a member of the Los Angeles Common Council during the 19th Century.

== Biography ==
Kercheval was born on 16 March 1829 in Preble County, Ohio; the family moved to Joliet in Will County, Illinois shortly after his birth. Kercheval, who was referred to as a "Will County boy" by one newspaper, crossed the continent with a group of American pioneers from Peoria, Illinois, leaving from St. Joseph, Missouri, on April 20, 1849. He settled in Los Angeles by 1870.

His wife, Sarah Adelaide Wilson Kercheval, died in the family residence on Lemon Street on April 13, 1892. They had three children, Rosalie Wilson Kercheval, Leland Nelson Kercheval and Venia Alice Kercheval.

Kercheval was a miner in the Mother Lode and in Arizona. He later became one of the leading horticulturalists in the Los Angeles area. He sold his orchard at Santa Fe and Ninth streets for subdividing in 1887.

Kercheval's poetry was published in the Los Angeles Times and was read at meetings of local organizations. His 532-page book, Dolores and Other Poems, was published in 1883 by A. L. Bancroft & Company of San Francisco. The book included poems by his daughter Rosalie.

== Public service ==
Kercheval was elected on December 3, 1877, to represent the 3rd Ward on the Los Angeles Common Council, the governing body of the city, for a one-year term, ending December 6, 1878.

In 1890, he was a member of the Los Angeles County Agricultural Commission and served as its president. Historian Ralph E. Shaffer wrote that: "To some growers he would come to represent a bureaucratic establishment that did not know what to do about the problem facing the industry yet dictated unreasonable solutions to which the growers must conform."
