= Nathan R. Vail =

American politician

Nathan Randolph Vail
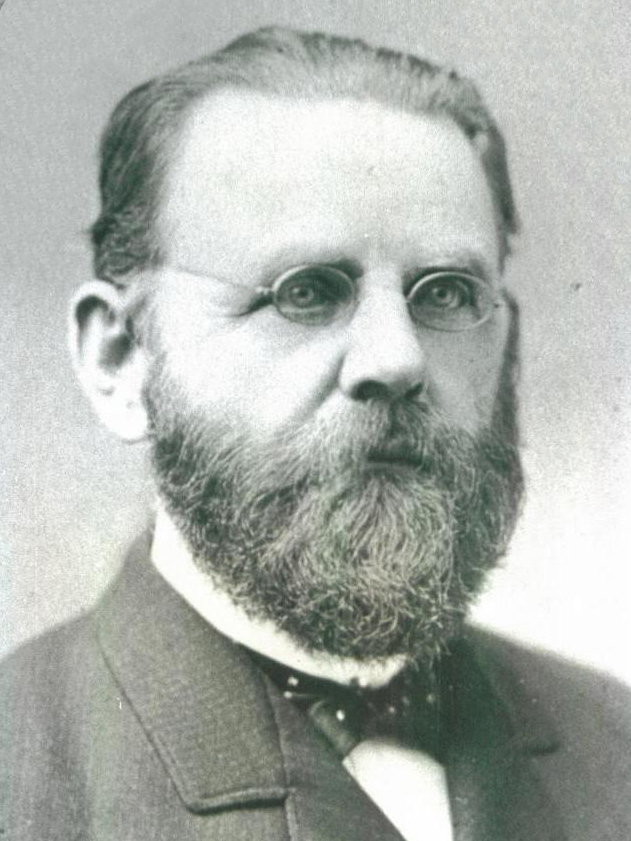

Member of the Los Angeles Common Council from the 5th ward
- In office December 5, 1878 – December 5, 1879
- Preceded by: District established
- Succeeded by: John P. Moran

Personal details
- Born: c. 1825 New Jersey
- Died: March 5, 1888 (aged 62–63) Los Angeles, California
- Party: Democratic
- Spouse: Anna Walker Vail
- Children: 4

Nathan Randolph Vail (1825 – March 5, 1888) was a mine operator in Arizona Territory, and a landowner in 19th century Los Angeles, California. He was a member of the Los Angeles Common Council, the legislative body of the city.

== Personal ==
Vail was born in New Jersey about 1825. He was married to Anna Walker Vail of Nova Scotia, and they had four children, Hugh W., John R., Lizzie H. (Mrs. Walter Irving Allen) and Frederick H.

His drowning death on March 5, 1888, resulted from an inspection trip he was making of his property at Redondo Beach, California, where he was a director of the Redondo Beach (development) Company: A coroner's jury heard testimony on March 6 that he had been warned against making the short passage aboard a flat-bottomed skiff in rough surf from the shore to a vessel lying at anchor off the coast, but he replied that he was "an old sea captain" and insisted upon the crossing. A huge wave pitched him and three sailors into the sea: He was wearing a heavy coat and drowned; the lightly clad crew survived.

== Professional ==
Vail's investments included "large holdings in land and water properties, and cattle and ranching interests both in California and Arizona." He also owned a business in Total Wreck, Arizona.

In 1887 Vail was elected treasurer of a nonprofit corporation "to secure and hold" property of the Episcopal Church in Southern California.

That same year Vail, along with Judge Charles Silent and D. McFarland, bought a 1,400-acre plot of Rancho San Pedro, an area known as the Dominguez Property and Salt Works, including a 1-1/2-mile frontage along the beach, back a half mile to an elevation of 600 feet. "The surface is thus beautifully diversified and rolling, thus affording a view of surpassing loveliness and grandeur for miles in all directions, including Los Angeles, Ballona and the whole valley." A first-class hotel, new streets and other improvements were planned.

After Vail's death, his estate was sued by L. J. Rose, who claimed that he had bought half of Vail's shares in the '49 Mining Company of Arizona for $4,000, but the shares were neither delivered nor the money refunded.

=== Common Council ===
Vail represented the 5th Ward on the Los Angeles Common Council, the legislative branch of city government, during 1878–79.
