= John King (California politician) =

American politician

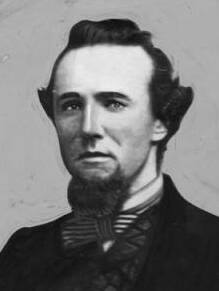
- King in 1867

President of the Los Angeles Common Council
- In office June 1, 1868 – December 9, 1870
- Preceded by: Murray Morrison
- Succeeded by: John Jones

Member of the Los Angeles Common Council
- In office May 10, 1886 – May 8, 1867
- In office August 8, 1867 – December 9, 1870

Personal details
- Party: Democratic

John King was an American politician who was president of the Los Angeles, California, Common Council from une 1, 1868 until December 9, 1870. He replaced Murray Morrison, who resigned. In 1865 he served a term on the county grand jury.

== Political party ==
He was a Democrat, but King was also a delegate to the Union Party county convention in Los Angeles on August 5, 1861, "for the purpose of selecting, nominating, and adopting such measures as will secure the election of Union candidates for County offices."

== Bella Union Hotel ==
King was at one time the manager of the historic Bella Union Hotel, and in 1862, he formed a partnership with Henry Hammill to lease and again operate the hostelry. A June 4, 1862, article in the Semi-Weekly Southern News said of the affair that: "We are pleased to notice the fact that a large American flag has been hoisted over the house, and we hope that the stigma which has been attached to [it] . . . will be removed, as the present proprietors, though fully realizing their duties as landlords are sound Unionists."

The partnership was dissolved in February 1865, with King retaining ownership on his own.

== Notes ==
Data is from Chronological Record of Los Angeles City Officials, 1850-1938, compiled under direction of Municipal Reference Library, City Hall, Los Angeles (March 1938, reprinted 1966). "Prepared ... as a report on Project No. SA 3123-5703-6077-8121-9900 conducted under the auspices of the Works Progress Administration."
