= Elisha Green =

Elisha Green may refer to:

- Elisha Winfield Green (c. 1815–1893), former slave who became a Baptist leader
- Elisha K. Green (1839–1917), entrepreneur in Los Angeles, California
