= Levi Newton Breed =

American politician

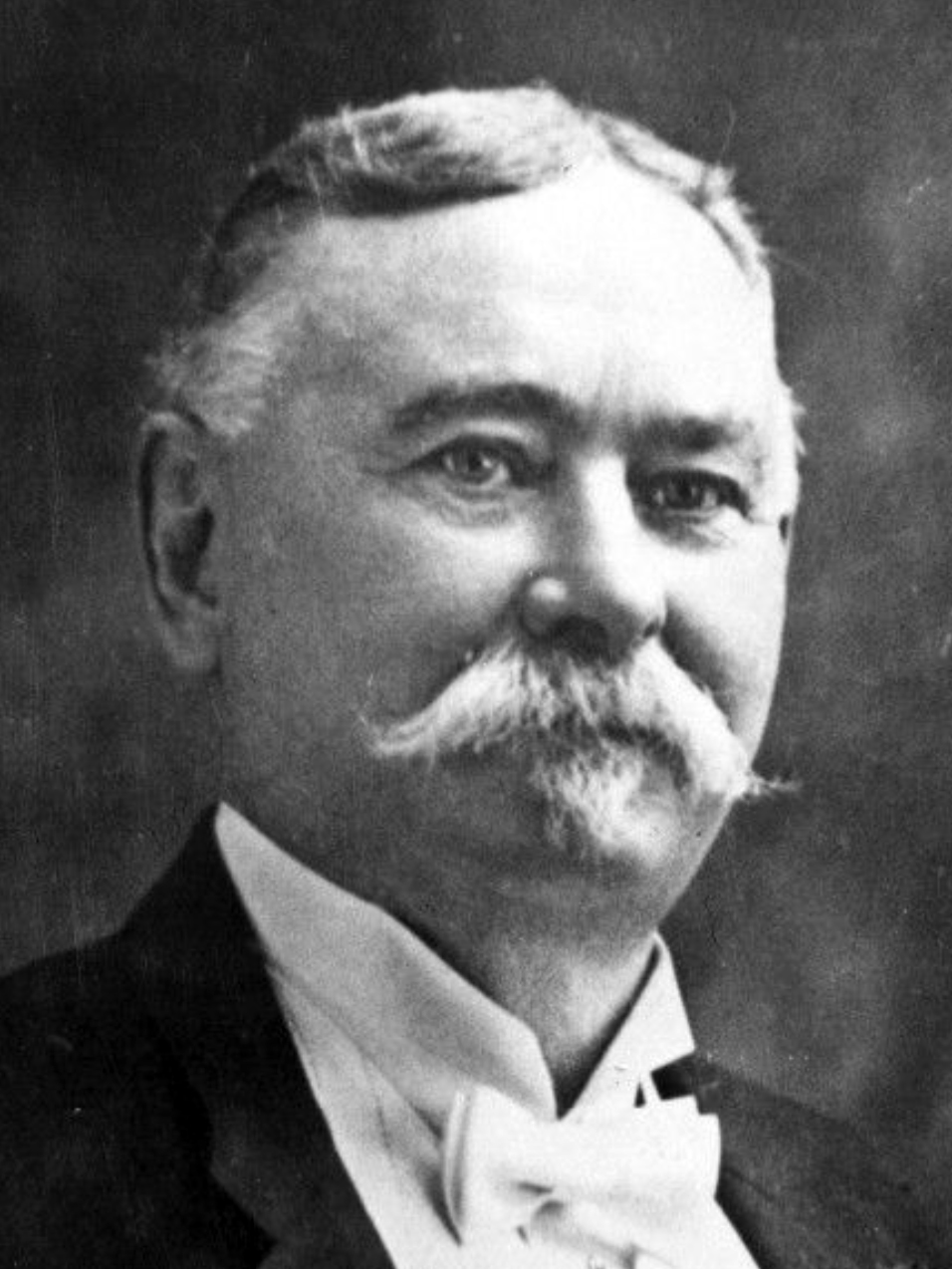

President of the Los Angeles Common Council
- In office December 13, 1886 – December 12, 1887
- Preceded by: Hiram Sinsabaugh
- Succeeded by: John F. Humphreys

Member of the Los Angeles Common Council for the 3rd ward
- In office December 10, 1885 – December 12, 1887
- Preceded by: Hiram Sinsabaugh
- Succeeded by: John F. Humphreys

Personal details
- Born: December 4, 1831 Manlius, New York
- Died: December 17, 1908 (aged 77) San Francisco, California
- Party: Republican
- Spouse: Samantha Blood (m. 1861; died 1867) Annie J. Blunt (m. 1870)
- Children: 3

Levi Newton Breed (December 4, 1831 – December 17, 1908) was an active and early American participant in 19th Century California, where he helped organize Lassen County and was a member of the Los Angeles Common Council, the governing body of that city.

== Personal ==
Breed was born in Manlius, Onondaga County, New York on December 4, 1831. When he was 4 years old, his family moved to Hannibal, New York, and Breed worked on his father's farm and attended school until 1850, when he moved to Schuyler County, Illinois, where he again farmed and went to school for two more years.

Breed married Samantha Blood of New York on September 21, 1861. She died August 19, 1867, leaving a 5-year-old son, Frederick Arthur. He married again to Annie J. Blunt of Maine on May 28, 1870. They had one daughter, Lillian M. Frederick Arthur was killed in a train wreck in New Mexico in February 1885.

In 1893 the Breeds were living at the Hotel Nadeau in Los Angeles.

He was a Mason and a Republican.

Breed died December 17, 1908, at the Hotel Stewart in San Francisco, leaving his wife and their daughter; the latter had married Charles C. Moore of San Francisco.

== Northern California ==
=== Vocation ===
In 1850 or 1853 Breed traveled to San Francisco and arrived there with just 50 cents to his name. His brother bought for him a newspaper route, of the Times and Transcript, for $700. "Within two months the paper was suspended, and the investment was lost."

Breed became a miner, at one time partnering with T.P. Kingsbury. Later he went to Honey Lake Valley, now a part of Lassen County, where he was the third Caucasian settler, and he opened a trading post in Indian Valley in 1856, having bought a "small stock of goods" from E.D. Hosselkus and T.J. Harvey.

In 1858 or 1859 he went north to the Fraser Canyon Gold Rush In British Columbia but returned without much additional wealth, and in the fall of 1860 he returned to Honey Lake. He was in Indian Valley for a year but came back to Honey Lake and bought a store, or trading post, in Janesville. He also owned farmland and timber.

Breed was one of the men who took part in a battle between the white settlers and the native Washoe Indians, of whom seven to eleven Indians were killed and fourteen were wounded and one white man was wounded.

By 1858 Breed's brother, J.H. (Jut) Breed, was also living in Honey Lake Valley.

In 1859, it was said that:

L.N. Breed sold goods and whiskey in a little shack that stood on the east side of Piute creek. . . . a crowd of emigrants from Missouri came into his place and a big fellow asked him what he charged for a horn of whiskey, the term meaning a drink. Breed named his price, probably twenty-five cents, and the man immediately drew a great ox horn from beneath his coat and said he would take one. The cheapest way to get out of it was to treat the crowd[,] and this Breed did when the laugh had subsided.

In 1861 L.N. Breed bought his brother's share of a trading post they ran in Smoke Creek, and later he built a store in Janesville, renting out the second floor as a lodge room for the Masons and the Odd Fellows. He remained "the merchant of Janesville for seventeen or eighteen years."

=== Public service ===
Breed and a settler named Smith J. Hill named the community of Janesville, California, in honor of Hill's daughter Jane.

Breed took an active part in a knotty California-Nevada boundary dispute in 1857. He was the secretary of a group of Honey Lake men who, "entertaining very reasonable doubts of our being within the limits of the state of California, and believing that until the eastern boundary of the state of California is determined by the proper authorities that no county or counties have a right to extend their jurisdiction over us," refused to accept the authority of Plumas County in appointing officers and organizing an election in their valley. They also took steps to ask Congress to organize a new territory in their area and pledged to "prevent the polls being opened."

By 1864, the area had become part of Lassen County, and Breed was appointed one of three commissioners to organize divide the area into districts and organize the election. In 1867, Breed was elected a constable for Janesville, and by 1869 he was named postmaster of a new post office in that town and also became county clerk that year.

== Los Angeles ==
In 1881 he moved to Los Angeles to retire, but he instead became "one of the most successful real estate operators and investors" in that city. In 1885 he was elected to the Common Council from the 3rd Ward, and the next year he was named council president.

Breed was a member of the first city Board of Fire Commissioners in 1887.

He was an organizer of the Los Angeles Chamber of Commerce and was its treasurer from 1889 to 1895. Breed was one of t'he founders of the Southern National Bank, which later became Merchants National, and was its president until 1898.

=== Trips ===
During his time in Los Angeles, he made two lengthy trips: One to Alaska in 1888 and one to Hawaii in 1895. Of the former, he said that "so far there is very little of the country settled up, except for miners and traders, and the indication for solid growth are not very favorable." Of the latter, he said that

"The natives are an indolent, but good-tempered and hospitable, race of people, who live only for today, giving no thought for tomorrow, and caring very little for anything except their present enjoyment. They are rapidly decreasing in numbers, and will soon become entirely extinct. . . . All the best people will stand by the present [counterrevolutionary] government . . . and are strongly in favor of annexation to the United States. What Honolulu needs at the present time is a sewer system and cable connections" with the United States.

== Legacy ==
In Los Angeles, Breed was interested in street improvements, "and the laying out of the city's parks. To his efforts is due much of the credit for the present park system" of the city. In his will, he bequeathed an amount to erect a monument in his memory, and ny 1939, the sum had grown to $5,000: In that year his heirs presented a plan for "an ornamental standard bearing a cluster of five lights at a height of 12 feet, the base to consist of marble in the form of 15 separate seats, arranged like the petals of a large flower." City park commissioners, though, were hesitant because of the possibility of vandalism.

Breed Street in Boyle Heights, Los Angeles was named for him.
