= John Jones (California politician) =

American politician and property developer

John J. Jones
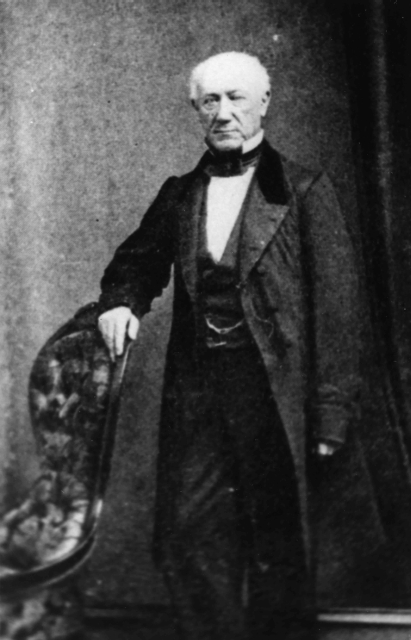

President of the Los Angeles Common Council
- In office December 9, 1870 – December 11, 1871
- Preceded by: John King
- Succeeded by: H. K. S. O'Melveny

Member of the Los Angeles Common Council for the 1st ward
- In office December 9, 1870 – December 11, 1871

Personal details
- Born: 1800 Warsaw, Poland
- Died: December 28, 1876 (aged 75–76) Los Angeles, California
- Spouse: Doria Deighton-Jones (m. 1868)
- Children: 3

John J. Jones (1800 – December 28, 1876) was a Polish-born American property developer and politician who served as President of the Los Angeles Common Council from 1870 to 1871.

== Personal life ==
Jones, a Jew, was born in Warsaw, Poland in 1800 and emigrated to Britain. After being transported to Australia following a criminal trial in 1836, he came to the United States and settled in Los Angeles. He was married in 1858 to Doria Deighton, with the marriage occurring three years after Doria came to Los Angeles from San Francisco. "Some historians posit that Mrs. Jones converted to Judaism prior to her marriage to Jones." Others maintain that she never ever converted. In Los Angeles the couple lived in a "large adobe home" adjoining the present site of Olvera Street in the Los Angeles Plaza Historic District. They had three children, including son Mark Gordon and daughters Constance (Simpson) and Caroline A. (Mrs. James B. Lankershim). He died in 1877.

== Business ==
John Jones was a wholesale grocer, and by 1853 the first wholesale liquor dealer in Los Angeles, with their business located the Arcadia Block at the corner of Main and Commercial Streets. By 1866 he had sold it to Harris Newmark, who had premises next to his.

=== Public service ===
John Jones was elected as the city's 1st Ward representative on the Los Angeles Common Council, for a one-year term ending December 11, 1871. Fellow Common Council members chose him as the first Jewish president of the city's governing body, during his term.
