= James Brown Winston =

American politician

Member of the Los Angeles City Council
- In office 1861–1862
- Preceded by: Arthur McKenzie Dodson
- Succeeded by: Eli Taylor
- In office 1863–1864
- Preceded by: Joseph Huber Sr.

Member of the Board of Health
- In office 1862–1863

Member of the County Board of Supervisors
- In office 1868–1871

Personal details
- Born: May 26, 1820 Culpeper County, Virginia
- Died: September 9, 1884 (aged 64)
- Children: James Wallace Winston Sr.; John Bandini Winston Sr.; Mary Ogden; Virginia Castle; Margarita Ogden; Carolina "Carrie" Winston; Julia Flowers
- Parents: William Alexander Winston (father); Mary Hooe Wallace (mother)

James Brown Winston (1820–1884) was the first medical officer of the City of Los Angeles, California, in the 19th century. He also was a member of both the Los Angeles Common Council, the city's governing body, and the Los Angeles County Board of Supervisors.

He and his wife operated the historic Bella Union Hotel in the Los Angeles Plaza area.

== Personal ==
Winston was born on May 26, 1820, in Culpeper County, Virginia, the son of William Alexander Winston and Mary Hooe [correct] Wallace. He received a medical degree from the University of Virginia.

He was married around 1861 to Margarita Victoria Josefa Maria Luisa Bandini, daughter of California pioneer Juan Lorenzo Bruno Bandini and his second wife, Maria del Refugio Francisco Lugarda Arguello. Their children included James Wallace Winston Sr (1862–1915), John Bandini Winston Sr (1863–1940), Mrs. (Mary) Lionel Ogden (1866–1940), Mrs. (Virginia) Albert Castle (1869–1940), Mrs. (Margarita) Claude Ogden (1870–1941), Carolina "Carrie" Winston (1874–1966), and Mrs. (Julia) E.M. Flowers (1876–1963).

Winston died September 9, 1884, at the age of sixty-four.

== Vocation ==
Winston practiced medicine for ten years in Virginia and later in Kentucky. He was also a surgeon in the Army. In 1849 he moved to Los Angeles and, with partner Alpheus P. Hodges, bought and managed the Bella Union Hotel, to which they made extensive improvements, adding a second story and a balcony.

Winston was the first health officer for the city of Los Angeles, from 1879 to 1883. In 1863–64, a disease swept through Los Angeles.

So many deaths were reported that the municipal authorities discontinued the tolling of the bells. Undertakers were fearful of touching the ravaged bodies. ... At least 500 persons were stricken during the first few week, and deaths in the pueblo for a time ran as high as 15 and 20 a day. ... At the Bella Union Hotel, always the hub of the town's activity, a funereal gloom was everywhere, and innkeeper Doctor Winston, now overworked in his capacity as town physician, kept the hotel running. His only thought was to save the living and to rid the town of the dead as quickly as possible.

== Public service ==
Winston served in the Los Angeles Common Council, the governing body of the city, in 1861–62 and 1863–64, and he was a member of the city Board of Health in 1862–63. He was elected to the county Board of Supervisors in 1868 and served through 1871.

Winston also became a prominent figure in civic affairs and was a member of a voluntary vigilance committee known as the Rangers, which was organized to assist in fighting crime; as well as the party planning committee, which arranged for all the town's dances.

== Legacy ==
In 1887, the City Council honored Winston by changing the name of Ogier Street, on which he had lived, to Winston Street, in the present Downtown area.
