= Frohling =

Frohling is a surname. Notable people with the surname include:

- John Frohling (1827–1862), professional flutist
- Lillian Frøhling (born 1964), Danish curler
- Torsten Fröhling (born 1966), German football coach and player
