= Pascal Ballade =

American politician

Pascal Ballade, also known as P. Ballade, (April 6, 1839 – December 1, 1904) was an American businessman in Los Angeles, California, and a member of the Los Angeles Common Council, the city's governing body.

He was the owner of the historic Pico House during the late 19th century, now in the El Pueblo de Los Ángeles Historical Monument.

== Personal life ==
Ballade, who was of Basque descent, was born April 6, 1839, in France, and came to California during the 1850s, where he lived in San Francisco and then had a sheep-shearing business in San Juan Capistrano.

His wife was Marie Mariluch of Harotcarena, Urepel, France, and their children were a son, Jean Mariluch; and two daughters, Marie A. and Antoinette Marie.

He became a naturalized citizen in Monterey County on August 23, 1869.

Ballade died on December 1, 1904, in Los Angeles.

== Career ==
In May 1883, Ballade opened the Alameda Foundry, with "three or four" employees, where iron work was done "of every description" and a "large number of Bouvier patent pumps are manufactured." In 1883–87 he was operating a grocery storeon the southeast corner of Alameda and Aliso streets.

Although the Pico House, built in 1869–70 with nearly eighty rooms, large windows, a small interior court, and a grand staircase, was once considered the most extravagant and lavish hotel in Southern California, by the time Ballade came to own it in the 1890s it had declined precipitously and was frequented by prostitutes.

In 1893 he was also managing the Ballade House, of which Jean Burubeltz was the proprietor.

== Legal problems ==
=== Criminal ===
Ballade was no favorite of the Republican Los Angeles Times, which referred to him as a "Democratic politician"; the Democratic Los Angeles Herald, on the other hand, said that Ballade "enjoys a most excellent reputation in the community."

One 1888 story in the Times read, in part:

Ballade has been a power in Democratic politics in the city for some years past, and, while there has been a great deal of complaint about his place [his hotel] at various times, it has been impossible to do anything with him. This immunity from arrest and punishment has had the effect of making Ballade think he was above the ordinary process of law.

The newspaper recounted the trial of Ballade, charged with battery upon a police officer who had been attempting to quell a disturbance within the Pico House. A jury found Ballade guilty, and he was fined $15. "The result cannot fail to be productive of good, as hereafter officers will probably be treated with more consideration when they are trying to preserve the peace in saloons and other hard places," the Times concluded.

The Times reported in August 1890 that Ballade "made a personal assault upon Charles Raskin of the Gaulois [newspaper], and received in return a blow from that gentleman's cane, the marks of which he will carry with him for some time." An account in the Los Angeles Herald said the "cause of the difficulty was that the Gaulois ... has for one year been publishing a number of articles reflecting" on Ballade. The judge, saying the evidence was conflicting, dismissed the case against both combatants.

In a later story the same year, the Times said:

P. Ballade is constantly in trouble with the French editors of this city. The other day J.P. Goytino, editor of Le Progres Californin [ [ [sic]] ], had something to say about Ballade's assignment of the Pico House stock, and when the two met on Los Angeles street at 9 o'clock last night, Ballade abused Goytino like a pickpocket a few minutes and whacked him over the head several times with a heavy walking stick. The police were called as soon as possible, but they arrived after the fight and refused to make an arrest without a warrant.

In February 1891 Ballade was arrested on a warrant charging him with gambling in that he had opened a room for the game of "Chinese pool."

By August of that year Ballade had lost his saloon license and the Police Commission was considering granting permission to Joseph Hyland to operate at the hotel.

Commissioner Lewis objected to granting the license unless a proviso was inserted notifying P. Ballade that if the saloon had to be put under police surveillance no further licenses would be granted in any name, taking the ground that Hyland was merely a stool pigeon. After some talk the license was granted, the other commissioners agreeing to notify Hyland, but declining to bring Ballade into the record.

=== Civil ===
One of the women living in Pico House swore out a complaint in May 1891 against Ballade for, she said, keeping the sum of four hundred dollars that she had entrusted to him.

Ballade filed a petition for insolvency in February 1890, stating that he had had difficulty in making collections and of selling real estate. He was declared insolvent on September 17, 1890, selling everything except his home on Alameda Avenue.

== Public service ==
Ballade was elected for two one-year terms to the Los Angeles Common Council, the governing body of the city, in 1881 and 1882.
