= James Edwards (Los Angeles politician) =

American politician

James Edwards was an American politician. He was a member of the Los Angeles, California, Common Council—the legislative arm of that city— in 1860–61 and was its president for part of that term.
