= Edward Wadsworth Jones =

American politician

Member of the Los Angeles Common Council for the 3rd ward
- In office December 7, 1885 – 1886

Personal details
- Born: November 28, 1840 New Hartford, Connecticut
- Died: December 8, 1934 (aged 94) Los Angeles, California
- Spouse: Ellen Carter Spencer
- Education: University of Tennessee

Military service
- Rank: Lieutenant-colonel
- Battles/wars: American Civil War

Edward Wadsworth Jones (1840–1934) was an officer in the American Civil War, a miner in Idaho and Utah and an entrepreneur in Los Angeles, California. He was a member of the Los Angeles Common Council, the governing body of that city in the 19th century.

== Personal ==
Jones was born November 28, 1840, in New Hartford, Connecticut, and spent his youth in Tennessee, where he studied at the state university.

In 1863 he married Ellen Carter Spencer of Illinois in Washington, D.C.

In 1871 Jones settled with his family in Salt Lake City for ten years, spent a year in New York and finally moved his household to Los Angeles in August 1882.

He died December 8, 1934, in the family home at 1540 South Wilton Place in the Arlington Heights district, leaving a son, Edward Conde Jones of Paris, France, and two daughters, Mrs. J. Forsyth of Los Angeles and Mrs. Louise J. Dobbins of Monterey, California. Cremation services were at Rosedale Cemetery.

== Military ==
At the outbreak of the Civil War Jones helped enlist a number of men who formed a military company and elected him captain. He began his service of more than three years in the 19th Regiment Connecticut Volunteer Infantry, which became the Second Connecticut Artillery. His unit was with the Army of the Potomac and in the Shenandoah Valley; at Cedar Creek he was in command of his regiment and was mentioned by General Philip Sheridan in his memoirs. Jones rose to the rank of major, then was breveted as lieutenant-colonel for his "gallant and meritorious conduct."

== Vocation ==
Jones operated a mining company in Idaho and Utah between 1871 and 1881. Its rich silver mines in the Salmon River region were the most profitable, with around $600,000 to $800,000 of ore extracted. He spent most winters in Salt Lake, but in 1876 and 1877 he went to El Salvador to examine the mines there.

As an entrepreneur, Jones was in 1886 the president of a syndicate formed to build a "first-class hotel in the style of the Arlington Hotel in Santa Barbara," on Sixth Street between Hill and Broadway in Downtown Los Angeles. It was to be on the site of Saint Vincent's College, which was planning a move to the northwest corner of Grand and Washington. The property instead became the location of the original Bullock's department store.

Jones was also a horticulturist, and in 1919, at the age of seventy-six, he sought a passport to visit Italy, writing in his application:

The applicant has been a grower of oranges, lemons, walnuts, grapes and other fruits for about thirty years . . .; knows something about the labor problems of this State; is aware that we are losing hundreds of our best laborers, who are returning to their Italian homes; has spent many months in Italy up to the beginning of the war [World War I]; speaks and reads the Italian language fairly well; enjoys improved health there and has friends in that country. He hopes and expects to sow seeds for our and their labor improvement, without which improvement California will suffer.

=== Politics ===
Jones represented the 3rd Ward on the Los Angeles Common Council beginning December 7, 1885, and was reelected for another one-year term in 1886.

== Memberships ==
He served for three years as the first president of the newly organized Los Angeles Chamber of Commerce beginning in 1888, and then on the board of directors from 1893–95. He also served on the board of the Los Angeles Public Library. Jones was the president of the Historical Society of Southern California.
