= John Goller =

American pioneer and first blacksmith in Los Angeles, California

Member of the Los Angeles Common Council
- In office 1865–1865
- In office 1862–1862

Personal details
- Born: July 7, 1825 Bavaria
- Died: July 7, 1874 (aged 49)

John Goller (July 7, 1825 – July 7, 1874) was an American pioneer and the first blacksmith in Los Angeles, California. He owned a blacksmith and carriage-making business and was a member of the governing body of Los Angeles as well as a founder of the city's first gas company.

== Early life ==
Goller was born in Bavaria on July 7, 1825. He grew up in a community of miners in St. Louis, Missouri, before settling in Illinois.

== Career ==
John Goller set out with other California Gold Rush pioneers from Galesburg, Illinois, on April 5, 1849, and traveled with them through Missouri to Salt Lake City. From there, they traveled on the Southern Emigrant Trail on December 4, 1849, but were redirected to California on an unrecorded route. The emigrants, included two children, age four and seven, traveled through Death Valley, often without water. Eventually they found their way to the Santa Clarita Valley, where they were welcomed, fed and given shelter.

When Goller arrived in Los Angeles, a man named Louis Wilhart or Wilhardt outfitted Goller with blacksmithing tools and sent him customers. He was the first blacksmith in Los Angeles; his first order was for an awning, for which he received five hundred dollars. He put together an American-style wagon, which remained unsold for a time because "The native people gazed at it with curiosity, but distrust, and went back to their carretas."

The porch roof of his wagon shop at the corner of Los Angeles Street and Commercial Street, which was a block south of Negro Alley, then part of Chinatown, was used as a lynching spot in the Chinese massacre of 1871, in which eighteen Chinese were confirmed dead.

Goller also made shoes, one account relating that he "hunted up old tires thrown away on the plains" to make them." Goller was the second man in the Los Angeles area to invest in a team of trotters.

In June 1867, Goller joined with James Hagan, W.H. Perry, Wallace Woodworth and George J. Clark to incorporate the first gas company in Los Angeles, whose population was then about 5,000. One historian later observed that the gas was made from "brea [tar], grape pumice, wood, coal and pretty near every thing available from which it could be derived. ... In time, coal imported from Australia became the source."

He worked in the forwarding business in San Pedro, Los Angeles, in competition with Phineas Banning, and also continued his prospecting endeavors in partnership with Grant B. Cuddeback. Goller eventually sold his forwarding business to J.M. Griffith, a lumberman.

Goller served on the Los Angeles Common Council from 1862 to 1863 and again from 1865 to 1866. At the time, Common Council was the main governing body of the city, which had a population of 1,610 in 1850 and 4,385 in 1860.

John Goller is memorialized in Goller Canyon, located in the southern portion of the Panamint Range, which offers passage from the Panamint Valley into Death Valley.

== Personal life ==
Goller died on July 7, 1874. He was survived by three daughters, his wife having predeceased him. One daughter, Christine, was born in 1863 and married George Stephenson in 1886.
