= Newell Mathews =

American politician

Newell Mathews (ca. 1833–1907) was a successful 19th−century businessman in Los Angeles, California, and was a member of the Los Angeles Common Council, the governing body of that city.

== Personal ==
Mathews was born in 1834 and married Sarah Snell Olds of Lamoille Township, Bureau County, Illinois, on July 4, 1868, in that state. He came to Los Angeles about 1877 from Illinois and had a successful business career: He represented the Studebaker Wagon Company and had his own implement and machinery dealership in the 200 block of North Los Angeles Street.

He died of heart failure on January 30, 1907, in a rooming house on South Broadway. A masseuse who was with him at the time summoned help when he was stricken, but four minutes after a doctor arrived, Mathews was dead at age 74.

Mathews, a member of the Unitarian Church, had three daughters – Amanda, Julia and Ellen – and a son, Bryant. The family home was at 2103 South Union Avenue in today's University Park district.

== Common Council ==
Mathews was elected on December 5, 1887, to represent the 1st Ward on the Los Angeles Common Council and resigned his post on December 1, 1888.

== References and notes ==
- Access to the Los Angeles Times links may require the use of a library card.
