= William Ferguson (Los Angeles pioneer) =

American pioneer (c. 1822–1910)

William Ferguson (c. 1822–1910) was an early American settler of Los Angeles, California, after it became a part of the United States in 1847. He was an extensive property owner and a member of the Common Council, the city's governing body.

Ferguson was born in about 1822, came West as a young man "and interested himself in mining", in which he prospered. He later established a livery business in the Old Plaza, then became a large investor in the Los Angeles Water Company and finally "went into the real estate business." He was estimated to be a millionaire.

In 1892–1893 Ferguson was the complainant in an unsuccessful suit against the City of Los Angeles to halt the sale of bonds that financed the purchase of the private Los Angeles Water Company, eventually turning it into a municipal utility. He was on the first board of directors of the Union Bank of Savings in Los Angeles in 1893.

In March 1897 Ferguson announced he would give "$20 per month for the next five or six months, or more, if necessary, for the construction of a boulevard" between Los Angeles and Pasadena, through Elysian Park, "provided no railway franchise be granted on said boulevard."

Ferguson purchased the Cahuenga Oil Company, with its ten acres of land and three wells, in 1901 for $14,000.

He died of heart failure on April 8, 1910, in his home at 758 Rampart Street.

== Notes and references ==
Access to the Los Angeles Times links may require the use of a library card.
