= John Henry Bryant (politician) =

American physician (d. 1903)

John Henry Bryant, known as J.H. Bryant, (ca. 1825–1903) was a medical doctor in 19th century Los Angeles, California, a mining entrepreneur, and a member of that city's governing body, the Common Council, in 1888–89.

== Personal ==
Bryant was born about 1825, and came to Los Angeles in the 1870s, from either New York State or Saint Paul, Minnesota.

In 1895 Bryant's eye was removed in Los Angeles after it was injured in an accident in Yakima Bay, Oregon, when "a small twig that had been bent and flew back" to strike him.

He died April 5, 1903, in Los Angeles from an attack of cerebro embolus and was survived by four sons, Henry L., E.A., W.E. and Norman L. Bryant, and three daughters, Dora Wetherwax, Olive M. Skelton and Florence G. Bryant. The interment was in Oakland Cemetery in St. Paul.

== Vocation ==
In 1877 the Los Angeles Times noted that: "Dr. J.H. Bryant and A.E. Clark, two of the directors in the new elevated electric railway company, . . . built the ice palace at the Saint Paul Winter Carnival. The railway was proposed for construction between Pasadena and the ocean via Los Angeles.

In the 1890s Bryant engaged in mining ventures. He was the president of the Los Angeles Petroleum Smelting and Mining Company, which owned the Copper King mine in Fresno County, the idea being to use petroleum in the area as fuel for the smelter. Work was halted for several months, according to the Times, when "there arose dissension among the members of the company, and work came to a standstill. Men who were working the mine did not receive their pay and placed an attachment on the company property."

In January 1897, Bryant became secretary of the Los Angeles Mining and Stock Exchange during a reorganization after the exchange had become too closely identified with the Republican Free Silver Club.

Bryant filed a petition for bankruptcy on July 28, 1899, stating that his debts were $57,535.84 and his assets were $75. Nevertheless, in September that year he was listed as one of the directors of the Wabash Mining Company and in January 1900 as its president. The company had fourteen copper claims and two mill sites on Dog Creek, about twenty-nine miles northeast of Fresno. It "adjoins and entirely surrounds the celebrated Copper King mine."

=== Public service ===
Bryant, a Democrat, was elected to the Los Angeles Common Council from the city's 3rd Ward on December 3, 1888, and served until February 21, 1889.

As a member of the Park Commission, Bryant was in April 1890 part of a committee that went out canvassing [or money "to give employment to idle men in Westlake Park, for three hours." The men were to be put to work on projects to improve the park.
