= Matthew Teed =

American politician

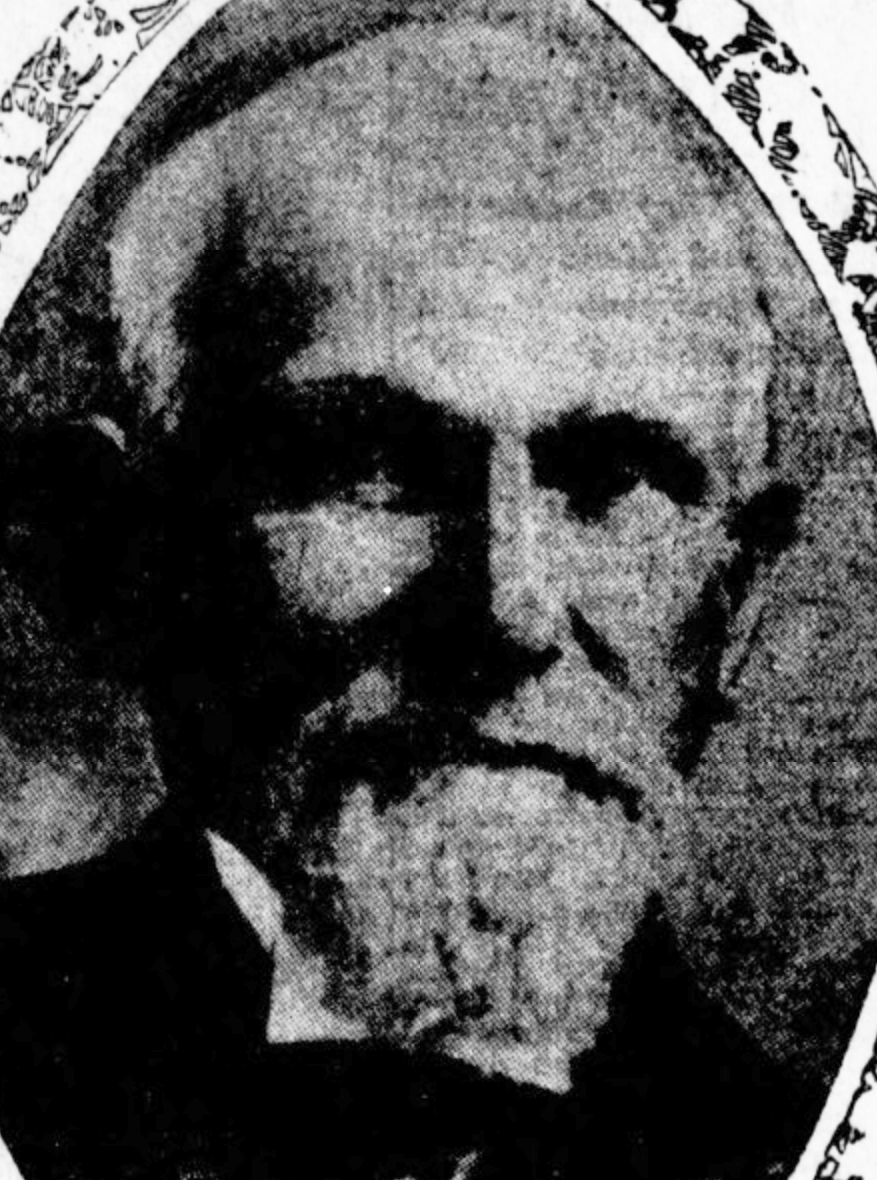

Member of the Los Angeles City Council for the 2nd ward
- In office December 9, 1870 – December 4, 1873
- In office December 18, 1874 – December 8, 1876
- In office December 11, 1880 – December 10, 1888

Personal details
- Born: April 17, 1828 Budleigh, Devonshire
- Died: March 31, 1904 (aged 75) Fort Moore, California
- Party: Democratic (until 1898); Republican (after 1898)

Matthew Teed (April 17, 1828 – March 31, 1904) was a member of the Los Angeles Common Council, the governing body of that city, in various time periods between 1870 and 1888.

Teed was born in Budleigh, Devonshire, England, on April 17, 1828, and came to San Francisco when he was about seventeen. He learned the carpentry trade there, then set up shop in Stockton.

There he was burned out, in 1857, losing everything he had but the clothes he wore. . . . He then came to Los Angeles, at that time a town of about 3000 inhabitants, and from here went to the Denver mining districts, just then prominent in the public mind. He had many wild experiences in his travels across the plains, and much of the time was a companion of Louis Simmons, a son-in-law of the famous Kit Carson.

Teed "struck out for the Northwest, visiting various points in Oregon and Washington Territory", then mined in the El Paso Mountains, ending up in Southern California. He worked for the U.S. government in Wilmington, then moved to Los Angeles, where he built a "substantial residence" on Fort Hill (later Buena Vista Street, now North Broadway), the address being 513 California Street.

In 1868 he and Anna Toner married. She died in 1878, and in 1899 he married Helen G. Wyatt of Lamanda Park.

Teed was a Mason and a charter member of the Los Angeles Pioneers Association. Besides being on the Common Council, Teed was a member of the city's first Park Commission, beginning in 1895; he served six years.

He died March 31, 1904, at the age of seventy-six. Cremation was at Evergreen Cemetery.
