= William Thomas Lambie =

American politician

Member of the Los Angeles Common Council for the 1st ward
- In office December 4, 1883 – 1884
- Preceded by: Charles W. Schroeder
- In office 1886–1887
- Preceded by: Thomas Goss

Personal details
- Born: November 9, 1837 Williamsport, Maryland
- Died: January 21, 1900 (aged 62)
- Occupation: Civil engineer

William Thomas Lambie (1837–1900) was a civil engineer who worked on construction projects throughout the American Southwest in the 19th century and was a member of the Los Angeles, California, Common Council, the governing body of that city. He was killed in the collapse of a tunnel on January 21, 1900.

== Personal ==
Lambie was born November 9, 1837, in Williamsport, Maryland, the son of John Lambie of Golston, Ayreshire, Scotland, and Eliza Ann Krebs of Maryland. He was married on June 3, 1872, in Washington, D.C., to Leonora Wingard Entler of Shepherdstown, West Virginia, and they had three children, Grace Virginia, Nellie Entler (Mrs. William F. Goble) and Hugh Krebs.

== Tunnel collapse ==
Lambie, who was working for the city engineer as an inspector at the time, was among twelve men who were buried or trapped when the west end of the Second Street Tunnel collapsed shortly after 11 a.m. on January 21, 1900, as it was being dug beneath Bunker Hill. He was pinned down under a mass of earth and broken timbers, but workers scraped the earth from his face so he could breathe. Workers could not remove the wooden beams, so they dug beneath him. For a time he was in danger of drowning in water from broken pipes. He was removed from the tunnel at 8 p.m. and taken to Good Samaritan Hospital, where he died a half-hour later.

Funeral services were conducted on January 24 by P.F. Bresee and J.R. Compton. Pallbearers came from the Masonic order and the Confederate Veterans.

== Vocation ==
Lambie enlisted in the Confederate Army on April 20, 1861, in Covington, Virginia, and served in the First Virginia Brigade. While still a lieutenant, he took part in the Gettysburg campaign between June 3 and August 1, 1863. He rose to the rank of major.

He came to California in 1869 and worked as a civil engineer for the Central Pacific and Southern Pacific railroads. In 1871 he was sent to do surveying for a proposed line from Lake Tahoe to the north fork of the American River, the "idea being that a tunnel constructed on such a line and low enough to tap the lake could be built at the joint expense of the Central Pacific railroad company and the City of San Francisco to make that lake available as a supply for water." The endeavor was abandoned after "several weeks of hard work" and "a heavy rain that turned to snow."

He was in charge of the construction of the Newhall Tunnel in 1876, after which he moved to Los Angeles and worked on projects in the Southwestern United States as far east as El Paso, Texas.

== Public service ==
Lambie, a Democrat, was elected to represent the 1st Ward on the Los Angeles Common Council on December 4, 1883, for a one-year term and was re-elected the next year.

He was city surveyor and city engineer for a year beginning December 5, 1887.

== Legacy ==
Lambie Street, just south of Lincoln Park (Los Angeles) and Valley Boulevard in Boyle Heights, was named for him.
