= Henry R. Myles =

American physician and politician

Member of the Los Angeles Common Council
- In office September 6, 1853 – May 4, 1854

Personal details
- Born: c. 1824
- Died: April 27, 1863 San Pedro, California

Henry R. Myles (c. 1824 – April 27, 1863) was a physician who migrated to Los Angeles, California, soon after California became a state following the Mexican–American War. He was elected to the Los Angeles Common Council, the governing body of the city, in a special election on September 6, 1853, for a term that ended May 4, 1854.

He was also the Los Angeles agent for the David W. Alexander and Phineas Banning stagecoach company, and in 1860 he opened Los Angeles's fourth drugstore. His partner in the enterprise on Main Street, "nearly opposite the Bella Union," was Dr. J. C. Welch, a South Carolina-born dentist.

Myles was killed in a boiler explosion of the steamship Ada Hancock on April 27, 1863, in San Pedro harbor, an accident that took twenty-six lives. His fiancée, M. Hereford, was mortally injured.
