= Peter Baltz =

American politician

Peter Baltz (1831–1903) was a French baker from Bas-Rhin, France, who immigrated to the United States in 1853. He was on the Los Angeles Common Council. and later became a businessperson and property owner again in San Jose, California.

== History ==
Baltz was born in Bas-Rhin Department of the Alsace region of France on 10 May 1831. In 1853 he immigrated to the United States, where he "experienced many trials and hardships," working in "the principal Eastern cities." He crossed the country westward to California in 1856, and settled in Los Angeles, where he opened a bakery. In 1860 he served on the Los Angeles Common Council, the governing body of the city.

The successful business was destroyed by fire in 1862 however. Baltz then took up mining, but lost some five thousand dollars in the venture. He opened a new bakery in San Francisco, saved "several thousand dollars," and returned to Europe for a time to visit his parents.

In 1869 he resettled in San Jose, where he opened the El Dorado Bakery on West El Dorado Street.

Industry and enterprise have brought their regard to Mr. Baltz in the way of a handsome fortune. He owns [in 1888] over $75,00 [sic] worth of property in San Joe, [sic] has erected a large business and hotel building on West Santa Clara Street this year, costing many thousand dollars.

In September 1894 a two-story building he owned in San Jose was destroyed by fire, and in February 1902 a barn he owned was gutted by an "incendiary fire," two horses perishing.

== Personal life ==
Baltz was variously reported as marrying at the age of 39 with Angeline Kuhn, a 46-year-old widow, like him from "Basreun (?) France," (on January 2, 1860) and/or with "Miss Chrisinte [sic] Kesser, a lady of his own country, tho [sic] whom he was engaged before his emigration" (in 1888).

He died on August 18, 1903, at the age of seventy-three, leaving "a considerable estate."
