= John P. Moran =

American politician (1857–1916)

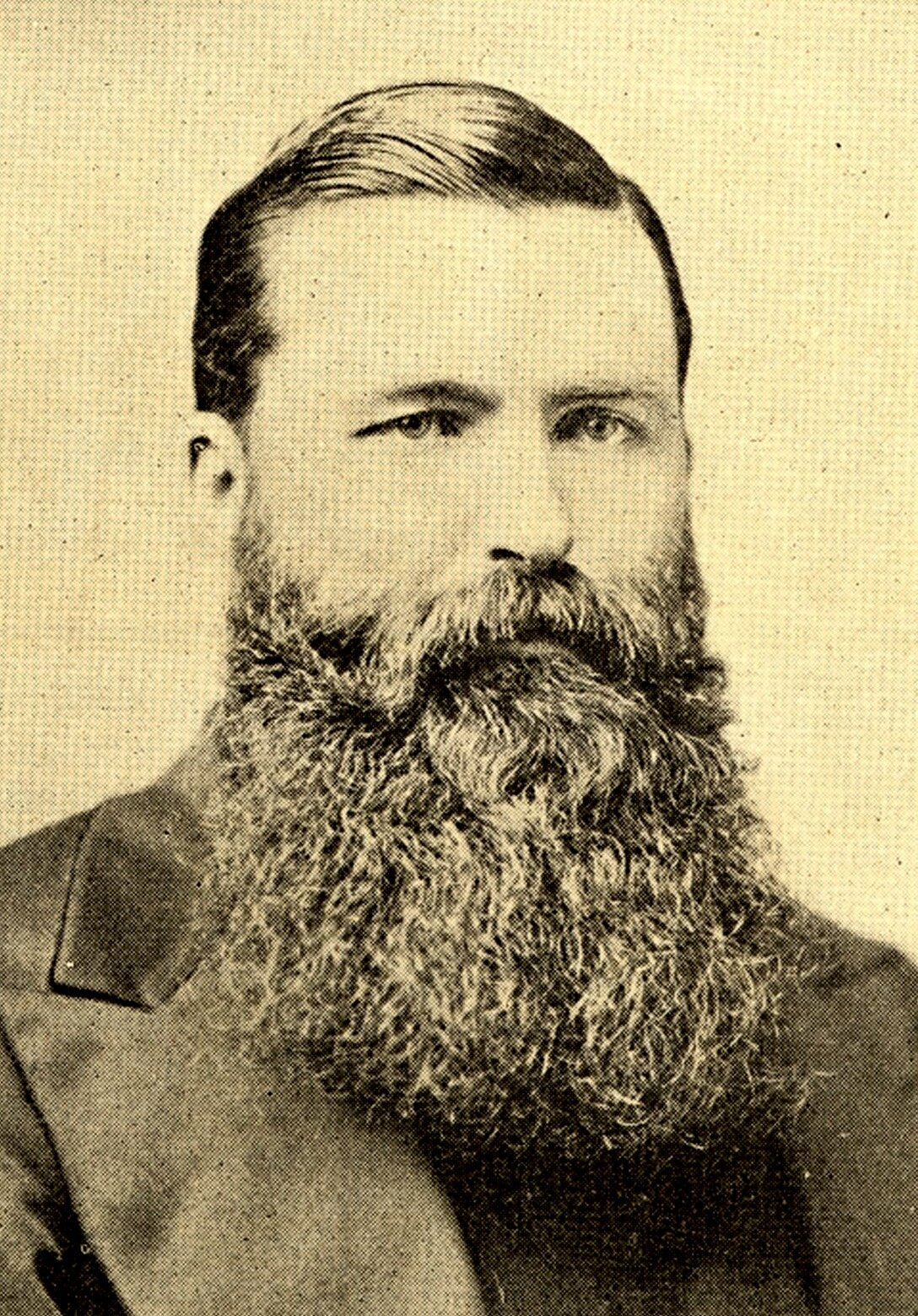
- Moran in 1890

Member of the Los Angeles Common Council from the 5th ward
- In office December 5, 1879 – December 8, 1883

President of the Los Angeles Common Council
- In office December 10, 1881 – December 8, 1883
- Preceded by: Edward Falles Spence
- Succeeded by: Walter Scott Moore

Personal details
- Born: June 17, 1857
- Died: December 6, 1916 (aged 59)
- Party: Democratic

John P. Moran (June 17, 1857 – December 6, 1916) was for three years a member of the Los Angeles, California Common Council, beginning in 1879. He was council president for two years.

== Family ==
Mrs. Mary Moran, who lived at East Ninth Street and Maple Avenue, was the head of the family. She had a son, John P., and two daughters, Mrs. Mary A. Dennison and Mrs. Catherine O'Connell. She died on December 11, 1894.

== Community activities ==
In the 1880s, Moran was a member of the Los Angeles County Democratic Central Committee. He was also the president of the Young Men's Institute in Los Angeles, and was grand first vice president of the California unit of the organization.

In 1925, Moran was one of the organizers of a social and historical group called the Sons of Los Angeles, restricted in membership to those born in Los Angeles County before 1881.

== Common Council ==
Moran was elected to the Common Council—the legislative arm of the city—in December 1879 and served until December 1882. He was president of the council for two years.

== Administrator ==
In the 1890s, Moran was the center of a legal dispute over the validity of the will of one Bridget Wilson, who had amassed a considerable fortune—some $300,000—since she immigrated to the United States from Ireland. While the matter was tied up in litigation, Moran was appointed administrator of her estate, but when it came time to settle, it was alleged that he was short by some $9,300. The suit was settled in compromise for $3,066.
