= Henry Wartenberg =

American politician

Henry Wartenberg was a merchant and civic leader in Los Angeles, California, during the 19th century. He was the first president of the city's first volunteer fire department, in 1868–69, and a member of the Los Angeles Common Council, the governing body of the city, from 1868 to 1870.

On June 14, 1867, Wartenberg was proprietor of a shop in partnership with Wolf Kalisher, sited in a group of businesses called Bell's Row or Bell's Block, when a fire took hold and spread from building to building until the entire block was leveled. Two years later, a volunteer fire department—the city's first—finally took shape with Wartenberg as president. The organization was called the Thirty-Eights, the number of firemen that could be raised to fight a blaze.

The two partners also transformed an old barn on Alameda Street between Ducommun Street and First Street into a tanning house for curing animal hides.

In 1870, Wartenberg was the president of the Los Angeles Hebrew Benevolent Society, predecessor of today's Jewish Family Service of Los Angeles. He was a member of the Odd Fellows lodge.
