= Julius L. and Morris Moritz =

American politician

Julius L. Morris (1830–1909) and Morritz Morris (about 1836–1903) were two German-born brothers who settled in Los Angeles, California, in 1853 and became prominent retail merchants in the newly incorporated American city as well as community leaders. Julius was a member of the Los Angeles County Board of Supervisors in 1861–63 and city treasurer in 1863–64; Morritz was a member of the Los Angeles Common Council, the governing body of the city, in 1866 for a partial term and in 1868 and 1869 for two one-year terms.

Their original family name was Oberzinsky; they adopted the name Morris upon their arrival in the United States. After Morritz first arrived in 1843, he spent "a few years" in Mississippi, working as a peddler in Yazoo County and becoming a naturalized citizen in nearby Claiborne County, before returning to Germany for a while. He then settled in Los Angeles in the early 1850s. They had a brother, Herman Morris, a newspaper reporter.

One report said that Morritz had once been "secretary of the Vigilance Committee of San Francisco."

Morritz died on July 10, 1903, in his home at 903 South Broadway. He had earlier lived "for many years" in an adobe house which he built in 1859 in the midst of a vineyard at Carr and Main streets. He was predeceased in 1899 by another son, Sigmund, who was a journalist.

Julius died on August 29, 1909, in Germany.

Both were Masons and among the founders of Temple B'nai B'rith (later the Wilshire Boulevard Temple).
