= Robert Steere =

American politician

Member of the Los Angeles Common Council for the 3rd Ward
- In office December 10, 1881 – December 09, 1882

Personal details
- Born: 1833 New York State, U.S.
- Died: April 29, 1910 Los Angeles, California, U.S.

Robert Steere (c. 1833–1910) was a latter 19th century pioneer in California, nine years after U.S. statehood. He was a member of the Los Angeles Common Council, the legislative branch of the city government.

== Personal life ==
Steere was born in New York State in about 1833 and moved to St. Paul, Minnesota, thence to Sioux City, Iowa, and Omaha, Nebraska. He set out with a party of seven across the Great Plains and arrived in California in 1859. From there he went to Placerville and then to El Dorado. He married Anne Higgins there in 1864.

He returned to New York for even years, then came back to California, finally settling in Los Angeles, California.

He died April 29, 1910, in his home at 226 South Olive Street in Los Angeles. Interment was at Calvary Cemetery, East Los Angeles.

== Vocation ==
Steere purchased a business in El Dorado, where he also was postmaster and agent for Wells Fargo & Company.

=== Public service ===
In December 1881, Steere was elected to represent the 3rd Ward on the Los Angeles Common Council, the legislative branch of the city government, where he served two consecutive one-year terms, ending December 6, 1883.

== References and notes ==
- Access to the Los Angeles Times links may require the use of a library card.
