= Samuel J. Beck =

American judge

President of the Los Angeles Common Council
- In office December 5, 1878 – December 5, 1879
- Preceded by: Bernard Cohn
- Succeeded by: William B. Lawlor

Member of the Los Angeles Common Council for the 4th ward
- In office December 5, 1878 – December 11, 1880

Personal details
- Born: April 22, 1835 Alsace-Lorraine, German Empire (today Lorraine, France
- Died: November 24, 1906 (aged 71) Los Angeles, California
- Party: Democratic
- Spouse: Sarah Beck (died 1893) Fidelia Anderson (m. 1905–1906)

Samuel J. Beck (April 22, 1835 – November 24, 1906) was a metallurgist, land developer, a judge in Montana, and a member of the Montana State Legislature in the 19th Century. He was also on the Los Angeles Common Council from 1878 to 1880 and was its president during 1878–79, in Los Angeles, California.

== Biography ==
=== Early life ===
Beck was born in Alsace-Lorraine (then part of German Empire, today it is a part of France) on April 22, 1835, to John Baptist Beck Sr. and Marguerithe Beck, and about 1838 the family emigrated to the United States.

In 1849 the young Beck "fought his way into Montana," to an area that is now the city of Bozeman. As a wounded veteran of conflicts with the Sioux in Oregon and Montana, he drew a survivor's pension for fourteen years. He was graduated from F.T. Kefnper's Collegiate School in Booneville, Missouri, in 1853 and then studied at the Massachusetts Institute of Technology, where he earned a degree as a metallurgist in 1870. He also became a lawyer that year.

He visited Los Angeles in 1869 at the behest of the W.H. Workman family and bought a vineyard on San Pedro Street, then moved to the city in 1876. He and Workman had been classmates in Booneville.

=== Affiliations ===
Beck was a Presbyterian and a Republican. In 1905 he was supreme commander of the Grand Council of the Legion of the Red Cross and presided at the organization's annual meeting in Atlantic City, New Jersey.

=== Marriages ===
His first wife was Sarah E. Beck, who died in April 1893. He was then married in July 1905 to Fidelia A. Anderson, who was at that time the principal of Washington-street School. The wedding of the "well-known school teacher" to Beck, who was "about twenty-five years" her senior, came as a "great surprise," the Los Angeles Times reported, adding: "That the wedding was unexpected in some quarters is indicated by the fact that Miss Anderson was named by the Board of Education only a week or so to continue as principal. In those days the policy of the Los Angeles School Board was that married teachers had to resign their positions.

=== Death ===
Beck died November 24, 1906 in his Los Angeles home. Masonic services were followed by cremation at Rosedale Cemetery. He left an estate of $26,982, and in November 1909 Beck's sister, Mary A. Chappell, filed suit to have Fidelia Beck removed as trustee of the will because the sister had not received monthly allowances promised to her. Fidelia responded that all the money was gone.

== Public service ==
Beck was elected judge of the Superior Court in Bozeman. He served two terms in the Montana Legislature, in 1872 and 1873, representing Choteau, Gallatin, Meager and Big Horn

After moving to California, Beck was elected to the Los Angeles Common Council in December 1878 and was unanimously chosen council president in 1878–79. He was a council member in 1879–80 as well and was "one of the principals in the opening and widening of both San Pedro and Seventh streets." He "took an active part in the inaugurating and completing of the city waterworks, whereby the lands of the east and west parts of the city which had hitherto been barren were made to flower by irrigation." Beck, it was said, had the idea of building two large reservoirs, one of which became the nexus for the lake in Echo Park.

== References and notes ==
Access to the Los Angeles Times links may require the use of a library card.
