= Jacob Frankenfield =

American politician (1838–1914)

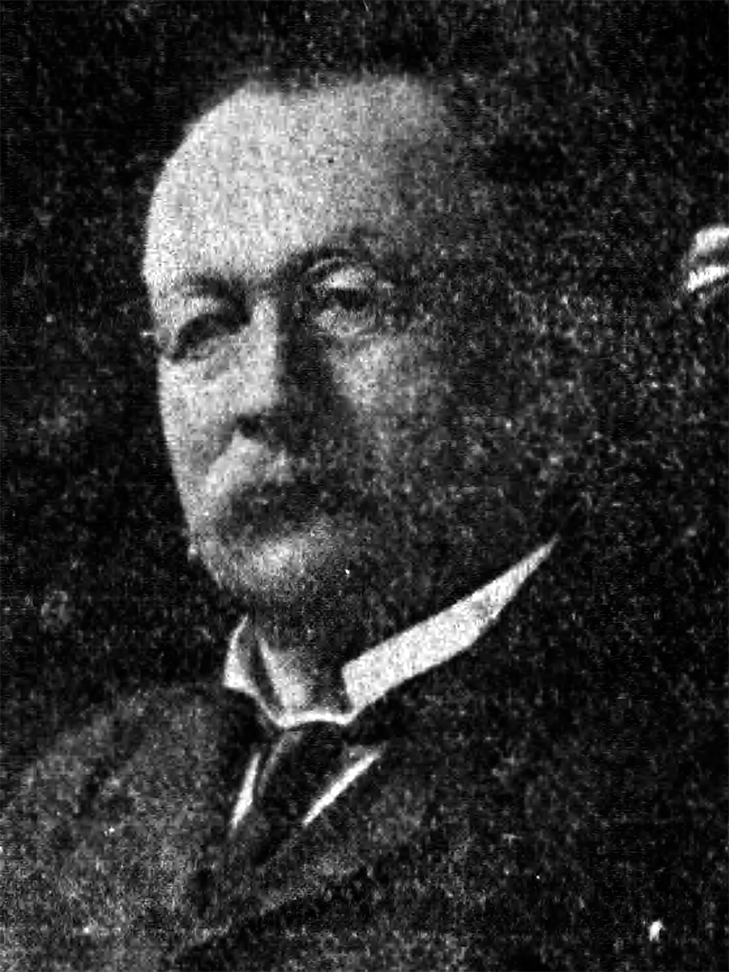
- Frankenfield in 1901

Member of the Minnesota Senate from the 36th district
- In office 1874–1875
- Preceded by: Henry Poehler
- Succeeded by: Henry Poehler

Member of the Los Angeles Common Council for the 5th ward
- In office December 10, 1885 – December 12, 1887

Member of the Los Angeles City Council for the 4th ward
- In office February 25, 1889 – December 5, 1890
- Preceded by: Constituency established
- Succeeded by: William H. Rhodes

Personal details
- Born: July 7, 1838 Bucks County, Pennsylvania
- Died: August 31, 1914 (aged 76) Los Angeles, California
- Spouse: Jeannie Fulmer
- Children: 3

Jacob Frankenfield (July 7, 1838 – August 31, 1914) was an American businessman and politician who served in the Minnesota Senate from 1874 to 1875 and Los Angeles City Council from 1885 to 1890. He was the President of the Los Angeles City Council for a year, and during his tenure helped with the building of the Los Angeles City Hall and helped change the name of Fort Street to Broadway.

== Early life ==
Frankenfield was born on August 7, 1838, in Bucks County, Pennsylvania. In 1857, he moved to Henderson, Minnesota, and married Jeannie Fulmer in 1864.

== Career ==
Frankenfield started his political career in Henderson, being elected the Mayor of Henderson. He was later elected to the Minnesota Senate in 1873. He served representing the state's 36th district during the 1874–1875 legislative sessions. In 1875, President Ulysses S. Grant appointed Frankenfield to the position of Collector of Customs for the district of Minnesota, which he held until 1879.

In 1892, he was on the opposition ticket for the fourth ward as a Republican. In 1883, he came to Los Angeles and was elected to the Los Angeles Common Council for the 5th ward, taking office in 1885. In 1889, he was elected as the President of the Los Angeles City Council before retiring in 1890. During his tenure, he helped with the beginning of the new Los Angeles City Hall at the corner of Second Street and Spring Street, with excavations happening under his watch.

After the City Council, he went into business but was a fire commissioner for a brief time. In 1900, Frankenfield was elected to the Los Angeles Board of Freeholders.

== Personal life and death ==
He and his wife Jeannie Fulmer Frankenfield had three children, two girls and one boy. Frankenfield died on August 31, 1914, at his family residence at 1007 South Hill Street. His funeral was held on September 3, 1914, with many Los Angeles pioneers attending; he was buried in Evergreen Cemetery.
