= Elijah H. Workman =

American politician (1835–1906)

Member of the Los Angeles Common Council
- In office August 8, 1867 – December 9, 1870
- Constituency: At-large

Personal details
- Born: October 20, 1835 Missouri
- Died: July 17, 1906 (aged 70) Boyle Heights, Los Angeles
- Party: Democratic
- Spouses: Julia C. Benedict (died 1876) Gilla Maria Corum (m. 1878) Anna K. Webb (m. 1884; died 1900)
- Relations: Protestantism
- Children: Gilleta M. and Laura (Mrs. Conrad Krebs)
- Parents: David Workman (father); Nancy Hook (mother)

Elijah H. Workman (1835–1906) was a pioneer agriculturist in Los Angeles, California, and co-owner of a saddlery there. He also served on the Los Angeles Common Council, the legislative branch of city government in that era.

== Personal ==
=== Family ===
Workman was born October 20, 1835, in Missouri, the son of David Workman of Clifton-Penrith, England, and Nancy Hook of Virginia. He had a brother, William H. Workman. Around 1854 the family crossed the Great Plains to settle in Los Angeles.

He was married three times—first, in Booneville, Missouri, shortly after the Civil War, to Julia C. Benedict (his childhood sweetheart), who died in 1876; then to Gilla Maria Corum of Boonville, in 1878 in Los Angeles; and finally, in 1884, to Anna K. Webb of Los Angeles; she died in 1900. He had two daughters, Gilleta M., and Laura (Mrs. Conrad Krebs).

=== Personality ===
His biography in the Los Angeles Public Library states that:

Elijah H. Workman was of the pioneer type of public figure: he wore boots to his dying day and lacked the more formal education of our times. With the conscientious fulfillment of his public duties[,] he combined the pioneer spirit of enterprise and development.

In politics he was a Democrat, and in religion a Protestant.

=== Death ===
Workman died July 17, 1906, at the age of 71 in his home at 1815 East Second Street, Boyle Heights.

== Vocation ==
Workman was in the harness and saddlery business with his brother, William H. Workman, at 76 Main Street. They also dealt in hides, which were recognized as a medium of exchange throughout the Southwest.

Returning from his trip to Missouri, Workman brought back seeds for trees and plants that he propagated in his own yard, getting the reputation of a "pioneer agriculturalist." His property, surrounded by 10th and 11th streets, Hill and Main streets, was planted with orange trees and flowers. He sold that land and moved to Boyle Heights after the death of his third wife.

== Public service ==
Workman was a member of the Los Angeles Common Council, the legislative branch of city government, in 1866–67, 1869–70, 1871–72 and 1874–75. He was on the city Board of Education in 1879–80 and on the Board of Equalization in 1869–70.

In 1870 Workman was a member of a committee to establish a public park, which was accomplished between Fifth and Sixth streets, and Workman planted seedlings from his own garden and nursed them from water hauled in barrels from his property a few blocks away. He planted elms, maples and rubber trees on the park site, first known as Central Park and then as Pershing Square.

== See also ==
- Boyle-Workman family
- Workman-Temple family
- Workman and Temple Family Homestead Museum
