= Philip Sichel =

American politician

Philip Sichel (born about 1823 in Germany) was one of the first eight "recognizably Jewish" pioneers to settle in Los Angeles, California, after that city became part of the United States in 1848; he was listed in the first Los Angeles census in 1850. He was a member of the Los Angeles Common Council, the governing body of the city, from May 7, 1862, to May 6, 1865, and was on the Los Angeles County Board of Supervisors in 1864, resigning on August 18 of that year.

Sichel was a landowner in what is now Anaheim, California, and sold land in 1866 to establish Anaheim Cemetery.

Sichel Street in today's Lincoln Heights, Los Angeles, was named after him.
