= William Moore (surveyor) =

American politician (1827–1897)

William Moore (1827–1897) was a city and county surveyor in Los Angeles County, California, United States, and a member of the Los Angeles Common Council, the city's governing body, in the 19th century.

== Personal ==
Moore was born April 3, 1827, in Augusta, Maine, where his families were farmers and linen weavers. He learned the carriage-making trade, and by age 21 was making carriages, buggies and sleighs in Lewiston Falls, Maine.

On July 4, 1852, he sailed from New York for California and spent eighteen months in the mining and lumber regions near Napa. He walked from Northern California to Los Angeles, arriving on his 27th birthday in 1854.

He was married to Mary E. and had a son, Hansen, who was born about 1880 and also became a surveyor, and a daughter, Florence (later Kreider).

He was known as "A man of wit and humor, with quaint expressions, ... both a scholar and linguist who could converse with the old timers of the City in Spanish or in many other tongues."

Moore was a bilingual English and Spanish speaker and practiced his language skills by writing some of his diary entries in Spanish. His language skills may have helped him secure work surveying land for some of Southern California's wealthy Mexican-American families.

At the beginning of the Civil War, Moore

was appointed Captain of a company of California infantry, and later organized and drilled a military unit which became a home guard unit. Both Captain and Mrs. Moore were prominent factors in the early social life of Los Angeles. "Captain Willie's Company" of home guards served as, a famous old time social and recreational organization in the early days.

He died January 11, 1897.

== Vocation ==
After arriving in Los Angeles Moore worked for a short time as a carriage maker before taking up surveying, at first working with George Hansen, who, as one account put it, "seemed to hold the office of City Surveyor almost interchangeable" with Moore between 1857 and 1875. As the city street superintendent, he was credited with "standardizing, straightening and leveling [to a] uniform grade the sidewalks of the City."

He was also the county surveyor in 1857, 1858–59 and 1861. In the late 1860s and 1870s he did the surveying and oversaw work for the Canal and Reservoir Company, owned by banker Isaias Hellman and John G. Downey, the governor of California during the Civil War. The firm built canals to bring water from the Los Angeles River to Bunker Hill. The three helped organize the Farmers and Merchants Bank of Los Angeles.

His surveying work include that on the city's sewer system, the San Gabriel Mission and its lands, the Los Nietos township, eventually incorporated as the city of Downey, and parts of the Arroyo Seco.

... he laid out ditches, reservoirs and tunnels, and aided in establishing the city's first sewer system. At one time or another, he is said to have surveyed nearly every foot of land in Los Angeles County. It is known he spent about forty three years of his private and public life surveying old Spanish grants, ranchos, county and city property, and examining old and new records and boundaries. So much an authority he became and so trusted was his personal probity that his expert testimony was frequently taken in courts of law without an Oath being required.

Moore invested in both city and agricultural land and grew oranges during the region's citrus boom. In 1878 he went prospecting and made a gold discovery.

== Common Council ==
Moore was elected to the Los Angeles Common Council in a special election on December 15, 1860, and served until May 7, 1861.

== Legacy ==
Moore's papers, daily diaries, field books, correspondence, notes and drawings are kept at the Huntington Library in San Marino, California, the gift of Florence Moore Kreider in 1935, 1938 and 1946.
