= Nehemiah A. Potter =

American politician

Nehemiah A. Potter was a member of the Los Angeles, California, Common Council for three terms between 1859 and 1863. He was president in the 1859–60 term.

Potter helped organize the first Presbyterian Church in Los Angeles, on the corner of New High and Temple streets, about 1855.
