= Augustus Ulyard =

American politician (1816–1900)

Augustus or August Ulyard (1816–1900) was the first American-born professional baker in Los Angeles, California, after the 1850 U.S. statehood of California. In 1856–57, he was a member of the Common Council, which oversaw the governance of the young pueblo.

== Personal ==
Ulyard, whose parents were French, was born on February 22, 1816, in Philadelphia, Pennsylvania, where he learned to be a baker.

He enlisted as a Texas Volunteer in the Mexican War, after which he went to St. Louis, Missouri, where he married Mary Field of England. The couple had no children of their own but, after they arrived in Los Angeles, "at different periods" they "adopted homeless children until there were seven in all."

The couple arrived in Los Angeles on December 31, 1852, after crossing the country with a wagon train of pioneers that left from Council Bluffs and pursued the Southern Emigrant Trail through the Cajon Pass and San Bernardino.

According to Ulyard's obituary in the Los Angeles Times, "At that time there were but five American women in Los Angeles aside from Mrs. Ulyard. The town consisted of a small group of adobe buildings in the neighborhood of the Plaza."

Ulyard died on August 5, 1900.

== Professional life ==
=== Bakery ===
Ulyard rented an adobe and set up a bakery business, using yeast that his wife brought across the Great Plains to their new home. Ulyard "soon sought a new location on the outskirts of the pueblo, at First and Main Streets," later occupied by the Natick House. Later he moved to the southwest corner of Fifth and Main, the site of the Alexandria Hotel.

Ulyard was the first American-born baker in Los Angeles, naming his shop the American Bakery. He competed with Joseph LeLong, who was running his Jenny Lind Bakery and baking French bread. Ulyard made "German and American bread and cake, which soon found favor with many; later he added freshly-baked crackers," which he advertised as "baked in Los Angeles, and superior to those half spoiled by the sea voyage" from San Francisco.

The bakery was taken over by Louis Mesmer and then by James Rowan and his son, Thomas E. Rowan. The building was damaged by fire in December 1869, a circumstance that led to the establishment of Los Angeles's first organized fire company.

=== Stagecoach ===
In the 1870s, Ulyard began a stage business. This business had a conveyance drawn by four horses from Los Angeles at 7:30 each morning and returning from Santa Monica at 3:30 in the afternoon, "calling at all four Los Angeles hotels as well as the private residences of prospective patrongs." The fare was one dollar.

=== Public service ===
In 1856, Ulyard helped organize the Republican League in California and worked on behalf of the John C. Fremont campaign for president in 1856. He was elected to the Los Angeles Common Council on May 5, 1856. Ulyard was reelected once, serving until June 22, 1857, when he resigned.

=== Anecdote ===
In 1889, the Ulyards went to police court in Los Angeles and swore out a complaint against a book agent who, they said, "had seized her [Mrs. Ulyard] by the arm and handled her in an exceedingly rough manner" when she, following her husband's precedent of several days previous, refused to purchase a copy of a "history of Southern California" in which appeared a biography of Mr. Ulyard. "The officers are looking for the fellow," the Times reported.
