= James Baldwin (Los Angeles pioneer) =

19th century Californian settler, blacksmith, and politician

James Baldwin was an early American settler and blacksmith in Los Angeles, California, arriving some time after 1858. He was a member of the Los Angeles Common Council, the governing body of that city, in 1859–60.
