= Joseph Mullaly =

American politician (died 1906)

Joseph Mullally (died 1906) was a 19th-century brickmaker in Los Angeles, California, and a member of the Los Angeles Common Council, the city's governing body.

Mullally came to California in 1852 and to Los Angeles in 1854, where he began brickmaking along with partners Samuel Ayers and David Porter. Their best year was 1858, when they sold two million bricks for improvements proposed in 1859.

Two of the historic buildings for which he made bricks from the clay found on the site or nearby were the John Rains House in today's Rancho Cucamonga, in 1860, and the [Louis Phillips Mansion] in the Pomona Valley, in 1875.

The residence of Mr. Mullally is situated on the corner of Buena Vista [today's North Broadway] and College streets, ... one of the finest residences in the city of Los Angeles. The grounds have a frontage of one hundred and eighty-five feet on Buena Vista street and two hundred and eighty-five feet on College, and contain a fine bearing orchard, consisting of orange, lemon, pear, apple trees, etc.

A Democrat, Mullally was a member of the Los Angeles Common Council in 1857–58, 1872–73, 1874–78 and 1881–83. In 1896 he owned a rooming house called "The Wellington."

At the time of his death in December 1906, he was noted as "one of the oldest residents of Los Angeles and a member of the Society of Pioneers."
