= C. C. Lips =

German-American manager (c. 1835–1888)

Charles C. Lips (ca. 1835–1888), also known as C.C. Lips, was a member of the Los Angeles Common Council from the First Ward in 1877–78.

Lips was born in Stuttgart, Kingdom of Württemberg, about 1835 and "took his own life in a moment of insanity" in Napa, California, on August 4, 1888.

Lips, who was noted as "one of the substantial men of the city," came to L.A. from Philadelphia and worked as the manager of E. Martin & Co., a wholesale liquor house in the Baker Block. His wife's name was Mary E., and their son, Walter Lips, became city fire chief in 1905.
