= Julián A. Chávez =

American politician (1808–1879)

Julián Antonio Chávez
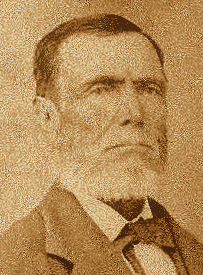
- Born: January 7, 1808; Abiquiú, New Mexico, New Spain, Spanish Empire
- Died: July 25, 1879 (aged 71); Los Angeles, California, United States of America
- Occupations: rancher, landowner and elected official
- Known for: Chavez Ravine
- Board member of: Los Angeles County Board of Supervisors; County Chair
- Spouse: Maria Luisa Machado

Julián Antonio Chávez (January 7, 1808 – July 25, 1879) was a New Mexican-born Californio ranchero, landowner and public official in 19th-century Los Angeles, California. Chávez served multiple terms on the Los Angeles Common Council and the Los Angeles County Board of Supervisors. He is the namesake of Chavez Ravine.

== Life ==
=== Origins and arrival in Los Angeles ===
Julián Antonio Chávez was born in Abiquiu, New Mexico, New Spain, on January 7, 1808, son of Francisco Chávez and Francesca Rosa Verlarde. He is thought to have arrived in Los Angeles, Alta California, Mexico, in the early 1830s, possibly with one of many trapping parties from New Mexico. The city census of 1836 listed Julián Chávez, aged 27, with a stated occupation of "laborer."

=== Land acquisition ===
Around that same time he began to acquire real estate, which could be done by simply petitioning the ayuntamiento (a local body similar to a city council) for permission to take possession of unoccupied tracts. In 1844 he was granted a plot of 83 acres (340,000 m^{2}) about 1.5 miles (2.4 km) north of downtown Los Angeles, which would become known as Chavez Canyon. During local smallpox outbreaks in 1850 and 1880, the canyon housed an isolation hospital to care for the afflicted. Later renamed Chavez Ravine, it is today the location of Dodger Stadium.

=== Political career ===
Chávez's first political office was that of assistant mayor (suplente alcalde) of Los Angeles in 1838. He served also as a "judge of waters" and later a "judge of the plains," as part of the Court of Sessions, which handled legal matters — mostly on water and cattle disputes. During his final term in 1873 as a member of the Los Angeles Common Council he worked closely on issues with Prudent Beaudry, Henry Dockweiler and William H. Workman.

Chávez was elected to the first Los Angeles County Board of Supervisors in June 1852. Other members were Jefferson Hunt, Francisco P. Temple, Manuel Requena and Samuel Arbuckle. He served on the seventh board in 1858 and the tenth board in 1861.

=== Family and death ===
Chávez was a widower until he married again, to Maria Luisa Machado on November 4, 1865. She was 22 years his junior, and as a daughter of Ygnacio Machado she came from a long-established family of Los Angeles rancheros.

Chávez died of a heart attack on July 25, 1879.

== Sources ==
- History of California, by Hubert Howe Bancroft, Volume 22 of The Works of Hubert Howe Bancroft, The History Company - Publishers, San Francisco, 1886.
- A History of California and An Extended History of Los Angeles and Environs, by James Miller Guinn, Historic Record Company, Los Angeles, 1915, Volume 1 (of 3).
