= John F. Humphreys =

American politician (1839–1922)

John F. Humphreys (1839–1922) was an American politician who served as a member of the Los Angeles Common Council in the 19th century. He represented the Third Ward and served as president of the council from 1887 to 1889.

Humphreys was active in Los Angeles municipal government during a period of significant growth in the city. His tenure on the Common Council included his service as council president during the late 1880s.
