= George N. Whitman =

American politician

Member of the California State Assembly
- In office 1859–1860

Member of the Los Angeles Common Council
- In office September 3, 1857 – May 10, 1858

George N. Whitman (ca. 1818- ) was an American politician. He was elected to the Los Angeles, California, Common Council, the legislative branch of that city's government, in a special election on September 3, 1857, serving until May 10, 1858. As a resident of San Bernardino County, he was a member of the California State Assembly from the 1st District in 1859–60.

Whitman was born about 1818 in Massachusetts.

In January 1856, Whitman, in Los Angeles, was "deputy sheriff for the State Prison."

On October 12, 1857, a mass meeting at the Pavilion on the Los Angeles Plaza was held in concern over the Mountain Meadows Massacre by Mormons and American Indians in Utah Territory. Whitman was elected chairman. The next day a resolution was adopted that called for "prompt measures" to be taken "for the punishment of the authors of the recent appalling and wholesale butchery of innocent men, women and children."

Whitman was elected captain of the San Bernardino Mounted Rangers, informally organized on March 29, 1859. When the unit was formally inaugurated on October 10, 1861, Whitman was first or second lieutenant.

The Los Angeles News reported in 1860 that Whitman and Sydney P. Waite discovered a silver mine "of astonishing richness" in Bear Valley, San Bernardino County."

In 1868, Whitman was district attorney of Mono County, California.

Whitman died on September 15, 1885.
