= James W. Potts =

American journalist

James Wesley Potts (1830–1896), known as James W. Potts or J. W. Potts, was a pioneer resident of Los Angeles, California, after that state became part of the United States following the Mexican War. He was a merchant, a landowner and a member of the Los Angeles Common Council, the legislative branch of the city, becoming noted locally as an amateur weatherman nicknamed "The Prophet."

== Personal ==
Potts was born December 20, 1830, in Rutherford County, Tennessee, the son of John Greene Potts and Cynthia Jones Potts. His father died when James was just four years old, and his mother when he was thirteen. He had a brother, William H.

He came to California via the Overland Trail in 1852, "walking the entire distance beside a yoke of oxen which pulled one of the old prairie schooners containing all of his possessions."

Potts was married in Los Angeles on July 12, 1866, to Emma Catherine Bedwell or Bedwells of Arkansas and Texas. They had five children, one of whom died when a baby. Surviving to adulthood were Louisa V. Potts (Sexton), Ida A. Potts (McKenzie, and then Johnson), Robert Whaley Potts, and Emma or Emelie M. Potts (Cole).

Potts, an amateur weatherman who wrote many columns or letters on that and other subjects for the Los Angeles Times, was nicknamed "The Prophet." The Times said he was "sometimes eccentric, but always charitable and forgiving." It noted that he was "one of the first Protestants in this county and gave freely toward the upbuilding of the First Methodist Church," of which he was a founding member.

In his later years his was a most familiar and striking figure on the streets, walking along with his old curved apple-wood cane on his arm, nodding a cheerful good-day to everyone and passing the weather, his favorite theme, with his more intimate friends.

He died January 22, 1896, in his home on Waterloo Street, in the Echo Park district.

== Vocation ==
On arriving in California, Potts first settled in El Monte, "where he engaged in commercial business", then moved to Wilmington and finally to Los Angeles. There he "worked on the roads for a mere subsistence for several months, then started as a fruit vender. [sic] Soon his sales enabled him to rent a store, and in a few months his receipts were as high as $40 per day." He invested in land and became wealthy, but:

Like many of the enterprising, active pioneers who have given California its wonderful history, he had his ups and downs in financial matters. He was several times rich and several times poor. ... The great monetary depression that swept over the country the past few years greatly crippled him, and it was his ardent hope and ambition to ride out the storm and regain financial independence for himself and family.

== Common Council ==
Potts was elected to a one-year term to represent the 2nd Ward on the Los Angeles Common Council on December 3, 1877, serving until December 6, 1878.

He was one of the council members who favored establishment of Evergreen Cemetery by a private group in Boyle Heights. The measure was controversial, and it was approved by a split vote in the council, Potts stating: "I can't see why these men object to having a graveyard on the other side of the [Los Angeles] River [,] for I should rejoice to bury my family over there—that is, when I die."
