= D. V. Waldron =

American businessman and politician

D. V. Waldron was a businessperson in 19th-century Los Angeles, California. He was the first person, in 1873, to receive a permit for a streetcar line in Los Angeles, and was a member of the Los Angeles Common Council.

== Vocation ==
Waldron owned a private outdoor park (called a "beer garden" by a 1935 writer) south of Downtown Los Angeles at Washington Avenue and Main Street. In 1873 he obtained a city permit to establish a horse-drawn public carriage between his business and Downtown at Temple and Main Streets. That same year he was issued a five-year permit to dig up Main Street from Alameda Street to Jefferson Street, lay down and maintain "two iron railroad tracks and to run cars thereon, to be propelled by horses or mules." Waldron, however, "forfeited his rights," and the franchise was taken up by Robert M. Widney.

=== Los Angeles Common Council ===
Waldron was elected to represent the 3rd Ward on the Los Angeles Common Council, the legislative branch of the city government, on December 6, 1875, and served two terms, until December 6, 1877.
