= John Ozias Wheeler =

American businessman (1823–1899)

John Ozias Wheeler (November 24, 1823 – April 11, 1899) was an American merchant, court clerk, government employee, city council member and newspaper editor. He worked primarily in California during the 19th century.

== Personal life ==
Wheeler was born November 24, 1823, in Groton, Connecticut, the son of John Holmes Wheeler and Esther Hill Buddington. He had a younger brother, Horace Z. Wheeler, who became appraiser-general in the U.S. customs house in Yokohama, Japan.

In September 1844 John Ozias Wheeler married Nancy Moore, and they moved to Florida. In 1849 he journeyed to California, bound for Rancho Chino, as it was called then, and his wife followed two years later. They had four daughters, Mary Esther, Louisa, Alice R. and Mattie. Three of these became Mrs. William Pridham of Los Angeles, Mrs. Clay M. Green of New York and Mrs. F.H. McCormick of Alameda, California.

Wheeler died in Redondo, California on April 11, 1899, at the age of 65.

== Career ==
=== Commercial ===
In conjunction with Isaac Williams, "then the proprietor of the Chino," Wheeler began his trading career, at first with "a train of merchandise and supplies," with headquarters at Agua Caliente, California, followed by a trading expedition across the Colorado Desert to Fort Yuma, Arizona. The next year, he and his brother began a general merchandising business in Los Angeles and a freight and forwarding house in San Pedro.

In 1857–58, federal troops in the Utah War were "entirely armed and equipped, mounted and supplied" by Wheeler's company.

In Los Angeles, Wheeler became secretary and manager of the Main Street Railroad in 1877 and of the Olive Street Railway in 1883, both positions lasting until 1886, when he and his wife traveled to the East for a year. He later became president of the Porphyry Paving Company and had extensive land holdings.

=== Journalism ===
In 1854, Wheeler and William Butts began a weekly newspaper, the Southern Californian, published in both English and Spanish.

=== Public and government service ===
Wheeler was a member of the Los Angeles Common Council in 1851 and 1852.

In 1858–59 Wheeler worked in the Los Angeles County Clerk's office, and between 1860 and 1867 he was a clerk in the federal justice system. He moved to Monterey, then relocated to San Francisco, and in 1870–73 he was chief clerk of the Indian Department of California. He returned to Los Angeles in 1874 as deputy collector of internal revenue. From 1880 through 1883 he was deputy clerk of the California Supreme Court, in charge of an office in Los Angeles.

=== Military ===
In 1853 Wheeler organized the first military company in Los Angeles, under state laws, and he was on the staff of General Andres Pico in the last part of that decade. He also raised and commanded a cavalry company in Monterey.
