= Samuel Marshall Perry =

American politician

Member of the Los Angeles Common Council
- In office 1878–1888

Member of the Los Angeles County Board of Supervisors for the Second District
- In office 1889–1893

Personal details
- Born: May 12, 1836 Venango County, Pennsylvania
- Died: July 21, 1898 (aged 62) Los Angeles, California
- Resting place: Evergreen Cemetery
- Party: Republican
- Spouse: Hattie Sargent
- Children: 3 Sons; 1 Daughter

Samuel Marshall Perry (1836–1898) was a member of the Los Angeles Common Council between 1878 and 1888 and of the Los Angeles County Board of Supervisors from 1889 to 1893. He was County Chair when the Los Angeles county courthouse was built.

Perry, who was referred to in the press as S. M. Perry, was born in Venango County, Pennsylvania, on May 12, 1836, and lived in Piqua, Ohio, before coming to Marysville, California, in 1860, where he was in the hardware business, which he left in favor of a gold rush to the John Day River country in Oregon. After returning to the East for several years, he went back to Los Angeles in 1875.

A Republican, he was elected to the City Council in 1878 and reelected in 1886. He was elected to the Board of Supervisors from the Second District in 1888.

The son of John Perry of Venango County, Maine, Perry was married to Hattie Sargent in Coles County, Illinois, on December 25, 1868.

Perry, owner of a plumbing business at 80 South Main Street, went into insolvency in July 1891.

He died at his home, 1952 Lovelace Avenue, Los Angeles, on July 21, 1898, leaving his widow, three sons, and a daughter. He is buried in Evergreen Cemetery.
