= Walter Scott Moore =

American politician

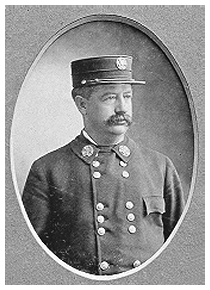

Member of the Los Angeles Common Council from the 5th ward
- In office December 11, 1880 – December 9, 1884
- Preceded by: William B. Lawlor
- Succeeded by: Hiram Sinsabaugh

President of the Los Angeles Common Council
- In office December 8, 1883 – December 9, 1884
- Preceded by: Edward Falles Spence
- Succeeded by: D. E. Miles

Personal details
- Born: December 23, 1853 Philadelphia, Pennsylvania
- Died: March 30, 1919 (aged 65) Los Angeles, California
- Party: Republican
- Spouse: Amenaida Raphela LanFranco (m. 1877)
- Children: 3

Walter Scott Moore (December 23, 1853 – March 30, 1919) was the president of the Los Angeles, California, Common Council in 1883–84 and chief engineer of the city's Fire Department at the turn of the 19th-20th centuries. He was ousted during an investigation into fraud in the department. He was the Republican candidate for California Secretary of State in 1886 and also ran for the state Senate.

== Biography ==
Moore was born December 23, 1853, in Philadelphia, Pennsylvania, to Isaac Walker Moore of Pennsylvania and Margaret Harvey Hughes of Maryland. His father died in the year of Walter's birth. He had a sister, Fannie M. Shoemaker.

At the age of 20 or 21 he and his mother visited Los Angeles on a pleasure trip in 1874, and he moved to that city soon after, where he engaged in real estate and insurance. He was also admitted to the bar but never practiced as a lawyer.

He was married on November 17, 1877, in Los Angeles to Amenaida Raphela LanFranco. Their children were Walter Scott Jr., Margaret (Mrs. Richard O'Neil) and Rowena (Mrs. Paul Selby of Johannesburg, South Africa).

Moore was "interested in Republican politics over a long period of years." He was a prominent civic figure, popular as a public speaker and after-dinner orator, and at different times was "candidate for the [California] Senate and Secretary of State. . . . For forty years he was a member of Masonic Lodge 42 and was historian of the Elks organization."

He died at the age of 66 in his home at 34 Saint James Park, in today's University Park district, on March 30, 1919.

== Public office ==
=== Federal ===
Moore served for four years as a deputy collector of internal revenue, and in December 1885 he and A. E. Sepulveda, another deputy, were acquitted by a United States Commissioner of "unlawfully obtaining money for carriage hire from the government."

=== State ===
In 1886, Moore, who was then the chief engineer of the city Fire Department, was the Republican candidate for California Secretary of State. He lost the November election to the Democratic William C. Hendricks, 45.8% against 48.8% after the Los Angeles Times printed a graphic story concerning a November 1885 night that Moore had allegedly spent in the company of three other "gilded young men" and four prostitutes:

. . . the unsavory apartments over Bob Eckert's saloon on Court Street were the scene of an orgie such as even the most salacious pen of ancient Rome never dared describe. . . . The four drunken male brutes and three of the four drunken female brutes were sprawled, almost nude, all in the most atrocious attitudes, about the front room. . . . The negro waiter was stretched stupid upon the floor, surrounded with a halo of the fifty-eight champagne bottles which the party had emptied, while the man who now asks your suffrage for Secretary of State, almost stark nude, was endeavoring to arouse the waiter to go and get a photographer for an obscene purpose.

In 1892 he was Republican candidate for the 37th State Senate District, but lost to the Democrat John H. Matthews, 2,957 to 3,287.

=== City ===
==== Common Council ====
Moore was elected as a 5th Ward representative on the Los Angeles Common Council and served for four years, from December 6, 1880, to December 10, 1884.

==== Fire ====
Moore was named the first chief engineer of the city's volunteer fire department in December 1883 and served until December 1884, and he served another term in 1886–87.

At the time Mr. Moore took up residence in Los Angeles[,] the city fire department was volunteer[,] with a higher social value than a practical one. He is credited with organizing the volunteers into a trained unit for fire-fighting[,] with such success that it was afterwards placed on the city payroll.

Moore was appointed to the city Fire Commission in 1889 and served until 1891. In January 1891 Moore was again appointed as chief engineer in a Fire Commission meeting in which "it was evident from the start that there was some constraint all around" and when Mayor Henry T. Hazard "announced that they had met for the purpose of electing a chief, there was a dead silence for several minutes." Moore was appointed in a 3–2 vote over the incumbent chief, Thomas Strohm. "All of the members of the board expressed their determination to remove Mr. Moore if he did not do his duty." He served that term until 1893, was off the board for two years and returned for a final term of five years from 1895 to 1900.

He resigned as chief in March 1900 after a county grand jury issued a report linking him with fraudulent purchases of hay for use by fire department horses. He was succeeded by former chief Strohm.

==== Freeholders ====
In 1888, Moore was elected to a Board of Freeholders that wrote the first city charter for Los Angeles and was chosen as the board's secretary.

== References and notes ==
Access to the Los Angeles Times links may require the use of a library card.
