= Morris L. Goodman =

American politician (1818–1888)

Morris L. Goodman (c. 1818–1888) was the first Jewish Los Angeles City Council member.

== Career ==
Goodman was elected to the Los Angeles Common Council in 1850 and was the only American citizen on that body as well as the only Jew.

He was a Los Angeles council member from 1850 to 1854, after which he became a deputy sheriff and served in the San Fernando Valley. Goodman began a term on the Los Angeles County Board of Supervisors in January 1861, but resigned after five months.

In 1872, he opened up a dry goods business in partnership with Theodore Rimpau, in Anaheim, California.

== Biography ==
Goodman was a member of Masonic lodge No. 42. He was also a member of the Central Committee of the local Democratic Party.

Goodman moved from Los Angeles to Anaheim, where he was a City Council member for a "number of years." He died there on January 23, 1888, at age 69 or 70.

== Resources ==
- "Holidays in the Valley: The Jewish Experience Immigration". David Silver. Los Angeles Times, November 29, 1991.
