= Los Angeles Common Council =

Former council in Los Angeles, USA

History
- Founded: 1850
- Disbanded: 1889
- Succeeded by: Los Angeles City Council

Leadership
- First president: David W. Alexander
- Last president: Jacob Kuhrts

Structure
- Seats: 7 seats (until 1867); 10 seats (until 1870); 3 wards (until 1877); 5 wards (1878 onwards)
- Length of term: About 1 year

Elections
- Voting system: First-past-the-post voting

The Los Angeles Common Council was the predecessor of the Los Angeles, California, City Council. It was formed in 1850 under state law, when the city had only 1,610 residents, and it existed until 1889, when the city had about 50,400 residents and a city charter was put into effect. It succeeded the council of the Ciudad de Los Angeles.

From 1850 through 1869, council members were elected at large under a first-past-the-post voting system, in which the top vote-getters were seated. From 1870 they were elected by electoral districts called wards.

== History ==
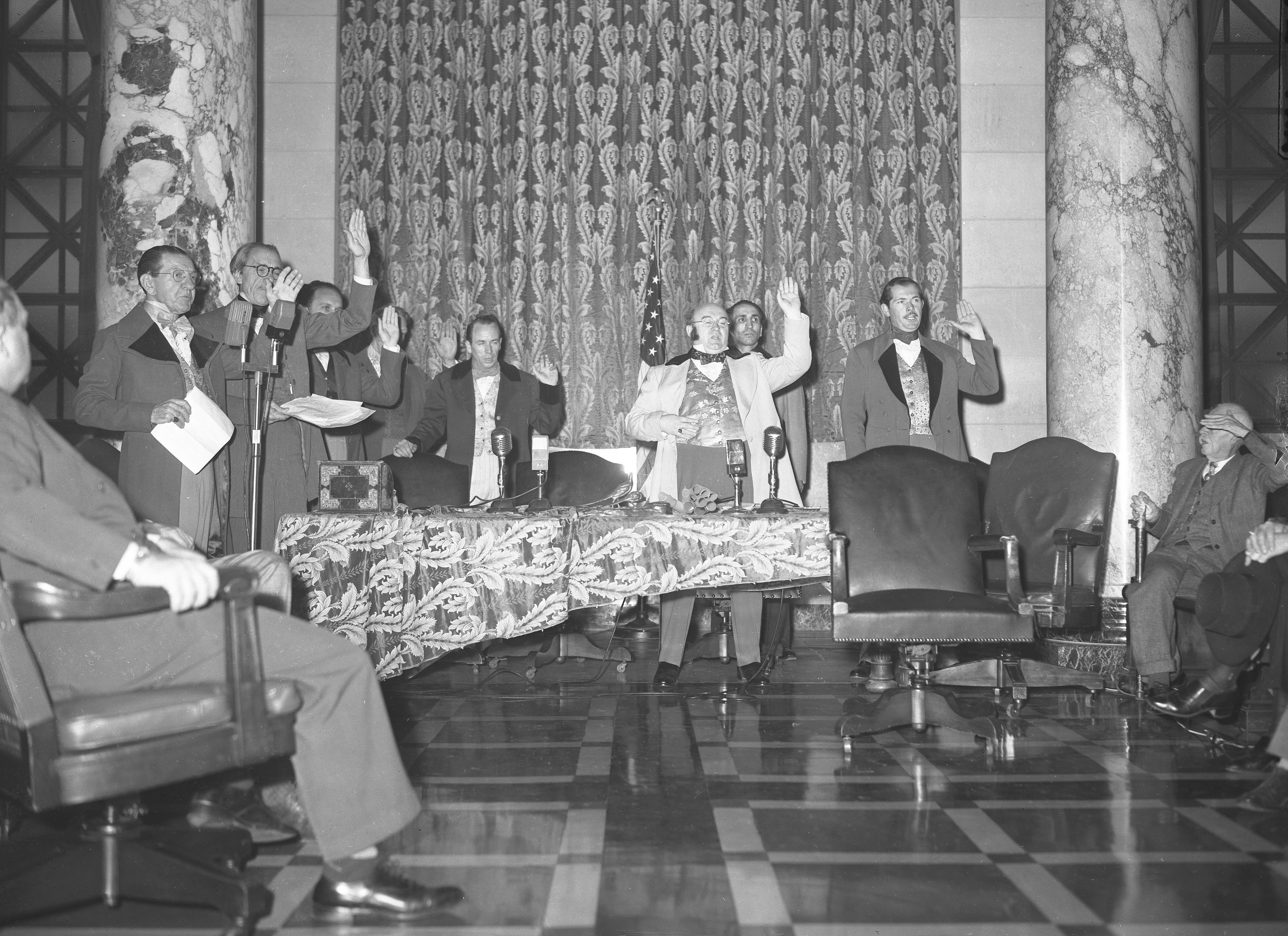
Actors recreating the first meeting of the Los Angeles Common Council in 1948.

The Los Angeles Common Council was created in 1850 as the city of Los Angeles grew from a remote town of 5,000 residents to a city of 15,000 residents. Between 1850 and 1858, the council had 7 seats and for two years after had 10 seats drawn by lots. From 1870 to 1889, the council had a ward system with three (until 1877) and five (1877 onwards) seats.

The Council had various responsibilities for governing the city, including the responsibility of governing the school system as several members were appointed to serve on a committee for the governance of schools.

In 1857, the officials that were elected on May 6 were deposed and the officials from the previous year were reinstated, though they never took office.

== Members ==
=== At-large (1850–1870) ===
Year	President										
1850	David W. Alexander	David W. Alexander	Cristobal Aguilar	Alexander Bell	Julian Chavez	Morris L. Goodman	Manuel Requena	Juan Temple	Vacant		
1850	David W. Alexander	David W. Alexander	Wilson W. Jones	Alexander W. Hope	Benjamin Davis Wilson	Jose Vicente Guerrero	Manuel Requena	Stephen Clark Foster	Vacant		
1851	David W. Alexander	David W. Alexander	Ygnacio Coronel	Alexander W. Hope	Agustín Olvera	Tomas Avila Sanchez	Manuel Requena	Stephen Clark Foster	Vacant		
1851	Joseph Lancaster Grant	Joseph Lancaster Grant	Ygnacio Coronel	John Ozias Wheeler	Agustín Olvera	Tomas Avila Sanchez	Manuel Requena	Stephen Clark Foster	Vacant		
1852	Manuel Requena	John G. Downey	Ygnacio Coronel	Myron Norton	Mathew Keller	Ygnacio del Valle	Manuel Requena	Narciso Botello	Vacant		
1853	Manuel Requena	John F. Jones	William Taylor Barnes Sanford	Arnold Jacobi	Pio Pico*	William R. Rand	Manuel Requena	Jose Maria Doporto	Vacant		
1853	Manuel Requena	Henry R. Myles	William Taylor Barnes Sanford	Ezra Drown	Juan Maria Sepulveda	Collins Wadhams	Manuel Requena	Jose Maria Doporto	Vacant		
1854	Francis Mellus	Francis Mellus	Lewis Granger	Solomon Lazard	Collins Wadhams	Antonio F. Coronel	Manuel Requena	Vacant	Vacant		
1854	Manuel Requena	Obed Macy	Alexander W. Hope	Ezra Drown	Collins Wadhams	Vacant	Manuel Requena	Vacant	Vacant		
1855	John G. Nichols	Obed Macy	John G. Nichols	Ezra Drown	Ira H. Stuart	Horace Z. Wheeler	J. W. Ross	Will Lloyd	Vacant		
1855	Ezra Drown	Obed Macy	Henry Uhrbrook	Ezra Drown	Cristobal Aguilar	Robert Glass	Paul R. Hunt	Timothy Foster	Vacant		
1855	Ezra Drown	Obed Macy	Henry Uhrbrook	Ezra Drown	Cristobal Aguilar	Robert Glass	Paul R. Hunt	John Schumacher	Vacant		
1856	Manuel Requena	Ygnacio del Valle	John Gately Downey	Ezra Drown	Nehemiah A. Potter	August Ulyard	Manuel Requena	Ira Gilchrist	Vacant		
1856	Manuel Requena	Myron Norton	George Henry Carson	Ezra Drown	Nehemiah A. Potter	August Ulyard	Manuel Requena	Ira Gilchrist	Vacant		
1857	Antonio F. Coronel	Antonio F. Coronel	George Henry Carson	Joseph Mullaly	John Frohling	August Ulyard	Hiram McLaughlin	John Barre	Vacant		
1857	Antonio F. Coronel	Antonio F. Coronel	George Henry Carson	Joseph Mullaly	John Frohling	George N. Whitman	Hiram McLaughlin	John Barre	Vacant		
1858	Antonio F. Coronel	Antonio F. Coronel	John Strother Griffin	John Goller	Cristobal Aguilar	Phineas Banning	David M. Porter	Stephen Clark Foster	Vacant		
1859	Nehemiah A. Potter	Nehemiah A. Potter	Ezra Drown	James Baldwin	Geronimo Ybarra	Arthur McKenzie Dodson	David M. Porter	Wallace Woodworth	Vacant		
1859	Nehemiah A. Potter	Nehemiah A. Potter	Ezra Drown	James Baldwin	Geronimo Ybarra	Arthur McKenzie Dodson	Vincent A. Hoover	Wallace Woodworth	Vacant		
1860	Abel Stearns	Abel Stearns	Damien Marchesseault	T.B. Collins	Elijah Moulton	James Edwards	Vincent A. Hoover	Peter Baltz	Vacant		
1860	James Edwards	William Moore	Joseph Huber Sr.	William H. Peterson	Elijah Moulton	James Edwards	Vincent A. Hoover	David Anderson	Vacant		
1860	Wallace Woodworth	William Moore	Joseph Huber Sr.	William H. Peterson	Elijah Moulton	Wallace Woodworth	Vincent A. Hoover	David Anderson	Vacant		
1861	Nehemiah A. Potter	Nehemiah A. Potter	Solomon Lazard	Antonio F. Coronel	Cristobal Aguilar	Ezra Drown	Arthur McKenzie Dodson	James Brown Winston	Vacant		
1862	Nehemiah A. Potter	Nehemiah A. Potter	Augustine Poulain	Antonio F. Coronel	John Turner	Jacob Weizel	Philip Sichel	Joseph Huber Sr.	Vacant		
1863	Joseph Huber Sr.	James Brown Winston	Eli Taylor	Antonio F. Coronel	Felix Signoret	Jacob Weizel	Philip Sichel	Joseph Huber Sr.	Vacant		
1864	Joseph Huber Sr.	Manuel Requena	Jose Mascarel	Antonio F. Coronel	Wallace Woodworth	Vincent A. Hoover	Philip Sichel	Joseph Huber Sr.	Vacant		
1865	William H. Perry	William H. Perry	Julian A. Chavez	John Goller	Harley Taft	John Jones	Juan C. Vejar	W. S. Van Dusen	Vacant		
1866	Murray Morrison	Murray Morrison	Elijah H. Workman	Louis Roeder	John Schumacher	Moritz Morris	John King	Vacant	Vacant		
1866	Murray Morrison	Murray Morrison	Elijah H. Workman	Louis Roeder	John Schumacher	Jose Mascarel	John King	Vacant	Vacant		
1867	Murray Morrison	Murray Morrison	Elijah H. Workman	Louis Roeder	John Schumacher	Jose Mascarel	John King	Antonio F. Coronel	Vacant		
1867	John King	Dionisio Botiller	Andrew A. Boyle	Louis Roeder	John Schumacher	Jose Mascarel	John King	George Dalton	Vacant		
1868	John King	Dionisio Botiller	Caro W. Childs	Louis Roeder	Henry Wartenberg	Jose Mascarel	John King	Mathew Keller	Moritz Morris	William H. Perry	Jacob Metzger
1869	John King	Dionisio Botiller	Ozro W. Childs	Louis Roeder	Henry Wartenberg	Jose Mascarel	John King	Samuel Bradford Caswell	Moritz Morris	Elijah H. Workman	Vacant
1869	John King	Andrew A. Boyle	James R. Toberman	Vacant	Henry Wartenberg	Luis B. Martinez	John King	Samuel Bradford Caswell	Moritz Morris	Elijah H. Workman	Juan C. Vejar

=== Wards (1870–1889) ===
Year	President	Ward																	
Year	President	1				2				3				4			5		
1870	John Jones	Julian A. Chavez	Bernard Dubourdin	John Jones	Vacant	William Ferguson	George Fall	Matthew Teed	Vacant	Heinrich Dockweiler	William S. Hammel Sr.	John Osborn	Vacant	Vacant			Vacant		
1870	John Jones	Julian A. Chavez	Bernard Dubourdin	John Jones	Vacant	William Ferguson	George Fall	Matthew Teed	Vacant	Frank Sabichi	William S. Hammel Sr.	John Osborn	Vacant	Vacant			Vacant		
1871	H.K.S. O'Melveny	Thornton P. Campbell	Oscar Macy	Julian Valdes	Vacant	William Ferguson	Prudent Beaudry	Matthew Teed	Vacant	Frank Sabichi	H.K.S. O'Melveny	William H. Dennison	Elijah H. Workman	Vacant			Vacant		
1872	Frank Sabichi	Joseph Mullaly	George R. Long	Julian Valdes	Vacant	William H. Workman	Prudent Beaudry	Matthew Teed	Vacant	Frank Sabichi	Eulogio F. de Celis	William Osborn	Heinrich Dockweiler	Vacant			Vacant		
1873	Frank Sabichi	Julian A. Chavez	Jacob F. Gherkins	Julian Valdes	Vacant	William H. Workman	Prudent Beaudry	Jose Mascarel	Vacant	Frank Sabichi	Eulogio F. de Celis	Charles E. Huber	Heinrich Dockweiler	Vacant			Vacant		
1874	Prudent Beaudry	Joseph Mullaly	Thornton P. Campbell	Ramon R. Sotelo	Joseph G. Carmona	William Whipple Robinson	Matthew Teed	Jose Mascarel	Louis Lichtenberger	Louis Wolfskill	Thomas Leahy	Charles E. Huber	Elijah H. Workman	Vacant			Vacant		
1874	Prudent Beaudry	Joseph Mullaly	Vacant	Ramon R. Sotelo	Joseph G. Carmona	William Whipple Robinson	Matthew Teed	Jose Mascarel	Louis Lichtenberger	Louis Wolfskill	Thomas Leahy	Charles E. Huber	Elijah H. Workman	Vacant			Vacant		
1874	Prudent Beaudry	Joseph Mullaly	Thornton P. Campbell	Ramon R. Sotelo	Joseph G. Carmona	William Whipple Robinson	Matthew Teed	Jose Mascarel	Louis Lichtenberger	Louis Wolfskill	Thomas Leahy	Charles E. Huber	Elijah H. Workman	Vacant			Vacant		
1875	Prudent Beaudry	Joseph Mullaly	Thornton P. Campbell	Ramon R. Sotelo	Jacob F. Gherkins	Jacob Kuhrts	Matthew Teed	William H. Workman	Louis Lichtenberger	Louis Wolfskill	Thomas Leahy	Charles E. Huber	D.V. Waldron	Vacant			Vacant		
1876	Frederick A. MacDougall	F. Tamiet	B. Valle	Ramon R. Sotelo	Jacob F. Gherkins	Jacob Kuhrts	John S. Thompson	William H. Workman	Bernard Cohn	Elisha K. Green	Thomas Leahy	John B. Thompson	D.V. Waldron	Vacant			Vacant		
1877	Bernard Cohn	F. Tamiet	B. Valle	Joseph Mullaly	Cayetano Apalblasa	John Edward Hollenbeck	C. C. Lips	James W. Potts	Bernard Cohn	John S. Thompson	John H. Jones	Albert Fenner Kercheval	Elisha K. Green	Vacant			Vacant		
1878	Samuel J. Beck	Ezra Hamilton	Louis Meinzer	John Schaeffer	Vacant	Richard Molony	Jesse Houston Butler	John Bobenreith	Vacant	Charles Brode	Simon A. Francis	S.H. Buchanan	Vacant	Samuel J. Beck	Samuel Marshall Perry	William H. Workman	Nathan R. Vail	William B. Lawlor	James Greer McDonald
1879	William B. Lawlor	R.L. Beauchet	Louis Meinzer	William Norton Monroe	Vacant	Jacob Kuhrts	Jesse Houston Butler	H. Schumacher	Vacant	Richard Molony	Edward Falles Spence	Elisha K. Green	S.H. Buchanan	Samuel J. Beck	O.H. Bliss	William H. Workman	John P. Moran	William B. Lawlor	James Greer McDonald
1880	Edward Falles Spence	R.L. Beauchet	J.G. Bower	William Norton Monroe	Vacant	Jacob Kuhrts	Matthew Teed	Jose Mascarel	Vacant	George Gephard	Edward Falles Spence	Elisha K. Green	Vacant	Bernard Cohn	O.H. Bliss	Burdette Chandler	John P. Moran	Walter Scott Moore	James Greer McDonald
1881	John P. Moran	Joseph Mullaly	J.G. Bower	Clinton S. Scheiffelin	Vacant	Jacob Kuhrts	Matthew Teed	Jose Mascarel	Vacant	Andrew S. Ryan	Robert Steere	J.B. O'Neil	Vacant	Bernard Cohn	George Kerckhoff	Burdette Chandler	John P. Moran	Walter Scott Moore	Otto G. Weyse
1882	John P. Moran	Joseph Mullaly	Charles W. Schroeder	Clinton S. Scheiffelin	Vacant	Jacob Kuhrts	Pascal Ballade	Henry Hammel	Vacant	Andrew S. Ryan	Robert Steere	Charles Gassen	Vacant	Alfred Louis Bush	George Kerckhoff	Joseph W. Wolfskill	John P. Moran	Walter Scott Moore	Otto G. Weyse
1883	Walter Scott Moore	Ezra Hamilton	Charles W. Schroeder	William Thomas Lambie	Vacant	Frank R. Day	Pascal Ballade	Henry Hammel	Vacant	Charles H. Johnson	Loring A. French	Charles Gassen	Vacant	D.E. Miles	Frank Sabichi	Joseph W. Wolfskill	Daniel Michael McGarry	Walter Scott Moore	John B. Niles
1884	D.E. Miles	Ezra Hamilton	James Velsir	William Thomas Lambie	Vacant	Frank R. Day	John Frederick Holbrook	Martin V. Biscailuz	Vacant	Charles H. Johnson	Loring A. French	Albert Brown	Vacant	D.E. Miles	Milton Santee	James D. Bullis	Daniel Michael McGarry	Hiram Sinsabaugh	John B. Niles
1885	Hiram Sinsabaugh	Thomas Goss	James Velsir	George L. Stearns	Vacant	Jacob Kuhrts	John Frederick Holbrook	Martin V. Biscailuz	Vacant	Levi Newton Breed	Edward Wadsworth Jones	Albert Brown	Vacant	Samuel Marshall Perry	Milton Santee	James D. Bullis	Cyrus Willard	Hiram Sinsabaugh	Jacob Frankenfield
1886	Levi Newton Breed	Thomas Goss	William Thomas Lambie	George L. Stearns	Vacant	Jacob Kuhrts	Michael Thomas Collins	Matthew Teed	Vacant	Levi Newton Breed	Charles R. Johnson	Edward Wadsworth Jones	Vacant	Samuel Marshall Perry	John Lovell	Joseph Hyans	Cyrus Willard	Horace Hiller	Jacob Frankenfield
1886	Levi Newton Breed	Thomas Goss	Edward A. Gibbs	George L. Stearns	Vacant	Jacob Kuhrts	Michael Thomas Collins	Matthew Teed	Vacant	Levi Newton Breed	Charles R. Johnson	Edward Wadsworth Jones	Vacant		John Lovell	Joseph Hyans	Cyrus Willard	Horace Hiller	Jacob Frankenfield
1887	John F. Humphreys	James Hanley	Edward A. Gibbs	Newell Mathews	Vacant	Thomas J. Cuddy	Michael Thomas Collins	Matthew Teed	Vacant	Edward C. Bosbyshell	Charles R. Johnson	John F. Humphreys	Vacant	Bernard Cohn	John Lovell	Burdette Chandler	Hiram Sinsabaugh	Horace Hiller	A.W. Barrett
1887	John F. Humphreys	James Hanley	Edward A. Gibbs	Newell Mathews	Vacant	John Moriarty	Michael Thomas Collins	Matthew Teed	Vacant	Edward C. Bosbyshell	J.H. Book	John F. Humphreys	Vacant	Bernard Cohn	John Lovell	Burdette Chandler	Hiram Sinsabaugh	Horace Hiller	A.W. Barrett
1888	Jacob Kuhrts	James Hanley	George O. Ford	C.N. Earl	Vacant	John Moriarty	Jacob Kuhrts	H.T.D. Wilson	Vacant	Edward C. Bosbyshell	John Henry Bryant	John F. Humphreys	Vacant	Bernard Cohn	Anthony McNally	Edward R. Threlkeld	Hiram Sinsabaugh	Austin Conrad Shafer	A.W. Barrett

== See also ==
- Los Angeles City Council, 1889–1909
- Los Angeles City Council
