= John Frohling =

American flautist and winemaker

John Frohling (1827–1862) was a Prussian-American flutist who was a key figure, along with Charles Kohler, in development of the Northern and Southern California wine industry and was the founder of Anaheim, California, in the mid 19th Century. He was also a member of the Los Angeles, California, Common Council, the governing body of that city.

== Personal ==
Frohling was born in 1827 in Prussia.

He was a professional flutist who was in a San Francisco band "that later became famous as the Germania Society."

In Anaheim's first wedding, November, 1859, Frohling was married to Amelie Hammes, the daughter of Philips Hammes, "in her parents' not-quite-finished new home." He was 31 and she, also born in Prussia, was 22.

He died in 1862.

== Los Angeles ==
Frohling was elected to the Los Angeles Common Council on May 4, 1857, for a term that ended on May 10, 1858.

== Founding Anaheim ==
As the story goes, in 1853, "inspired by some delicious Los Angeles grapes at a picnic lunch," John Frohling, Charles Kohler, and a German musician named Beutler decided to enter the wine business, despite having "never even seen a vineyard."

Eventually, the firm became known as Kohler & Frohling, with just John and Charles involved in the company. Together, the two entrepreneurs successfully founded one of the West's most influential wineries of its time. Their San Francisco wineries were so popular that they eventually resolved to acquire more land:

"As soon as the two German musicians [Frohling and Kohler] began to sell their wine successfully, they saw that they needed a larger supply of grapes than Los Angeles yet afforded; they also saw that the empty spaces of Los Angeles County might be quickly and cheaply developed into vineyards. The catch was to find people willing to do the work; the answer was the German population of San Francisco, a population that Kohler and Frohling, of course, already knew and understood. There was a considerable colony there by 1857, all of them drawn by the Gold Rush."

And so, Anaheim was born in 1857, when 50 German-American families from the San Francisco area were convinced to invest $750 each to invest into the newly formed Los Angeles Vineyard Society (the name given to the venture by Frohling and Kohler). Founders Frohling and Kohler hired George Hansen, Los Angeles County's assistant surveyor, to purchase and lay out the new wine-making colony.

The Los Angeles Vineyard Company garnered a reputation nationally, as it was the first wine brand to ship its wine from the west coast to the east coast — as early as 1860. In 1862, a member of the exclusive Farmer's Club in New York City said regarding the wine: “I think the samples shown today prove that America is capable of producing its own wine, and that we are really independent of the wine countries of Europe."
