= H. K. S. O'Melveny =

American judge (1823–1893)

Harvey Kilpatrick Stuart O'Melveny (1823–1893) was a Circuit Court judge in Illinois and a Superior Court judge in California during the 19th century. He was president of the Los Angeles, California, Common Council—the legislative arm of the city—in 1871–72.

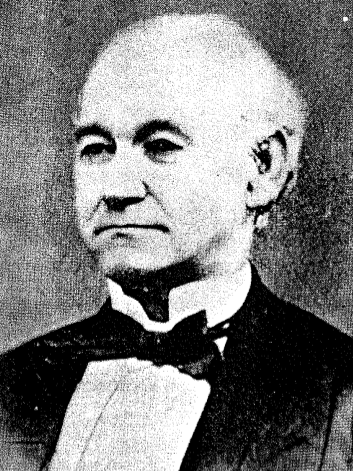
O'Melveny

== Biography ==
=== Family ===
O'Melveny was born on March 5, 1823, in Elkton, Kentucky, the son of William O'Melveny and Susan McKee, Presbyterians who immigrated from Ireland. He had five brothers and five sisters. The O'Melvenys moved to Southern Illinois when Harvey was three years old, and he spent his youth in Waterloo, Illinois, where he attended school. Discipline was strict in the family, and Harvey once recalled that he was once "thrashed" for whistling on Sunday, the sabbath.

=== Education ===
A "family tradition" held that O'Melveny attended McKendree College at Lebanon, Illinois. At the age of 20 he began to read law under the tutelage of James Shields and Governor William H. Bissell, and was admitted to the Illinois bar in 1846.

=== Marriage ===
In summer 1850, he married Anna Wilhelmina Rose, sister of the noted California pioneer and state senator, Leonard John Rose. Their children were Edward H., Henry William, Anna R. (Mrs. George Safford) and Adele (Mrs. Calvert Foy). In time, the entire family moved to Los Angeles.

=== Death ===
O'Melveny was stricken with his final illness ("apoplexy") while he was walking on Spring Street on November 7, 1893; he was taken to the home of his son Henry, 1148 South Pearl (Figueroa) Street (corner of 12th Street), where he died on November 18. Funeral services were held in the Pearl Street home on November 20.

== Career ==
O'Melveny began his law practice in 1846 in Belleville, Illinois, and in 1849 he crossed the Great Plains on horseback to reach Sacramento, California, on August 4 of that year; he formed a law partnership with Murray Morrison, whom he had known in Kaskaskia, Illinois. In Sacramento he was appointed recorder of land titles for the Sonoma District by General Bennett Riley, the military governor. Ill health prompted O'Melveny to move to Benicia, and practiced before a Major Cooper, "judge of the first instance under the Mexican regime (corresponding nearly to our justice of the peace.)"

After his temporary return to Illinois and his marriage, he established a "lucrative law practice" and had "achieved sufficient prominence" to become a Circuit Court judge of five southern counties in 1857. He held that position until 1862. During that time he became acquainted with Abraham Lincoln and Stephen A. Douglas. O'Melveny was a Democrat and a political follower of the senator, "whom he admired so much that he named his second daughter, Adele, after Douglas' wife." In winter 1862–63, he was put forward as a candidate to fill the Senate vacancy caused by Douglas's death, "but was defeated in the Democratic caucus for the nomination by two votes."

In 1869 the O'Melvenys moved to Los Angeles, where Harvey practiced law in partnership with Anson Brunson, and on December 4, 1871, he was elected to a one-year term on the Los Angeles Common Council and was promptly chosen as president. He was "connected" with ex-Mayor Henry T. Hazard—one source says as a law partner—and he was said to have taken "a vital part" in bringing the Southern Pacific Railroad to Los Angeles in 1876.

O'Melveny was elected a county judge in 1872, and in 1887 he was appointed to the Superior Court bench and served there "several years."
