= Juan María Sepúlveda =

American politician

Juan María Sepúlveda (1828 in Los Angeles – 1868 in Los Angeles) was a Californio rancher in the South Bay area in 1858, located on Santa Monica Bay in Los Angeles County, California. The area, originally part of the Spanish land grant of Rancho Boca de Santa Monica, later became known as the Huntington Palisades. He was the son of Francisco Sepúlveda and Maria Ramona Serrano.

He was named to the Los Angeles Common Council in a special election on August 9, 1853, serving until May 4, 1854.

A native of Los Angeles, he was married to Jesus Alvarado Sepúlveda, and they had a son, Ildefonso A. Sepúlveda, born about 1861.

He died on October 3, 1868.
