= Geronimo Ybarra =

American politician

Geronimo Ybarra was a Californio politician. He was a member of the Los Angeles Common Council, the governing body of that city, in 1859–60. On May 12, 1857, he was elected second lieutenant in a volunteer military organization, Lanceros de Los Angeles, with Juan Sepulveda as captain.
