= Edward C. Bosbyshell =

American politician (1822–1894)

Edward Christian Bosbyshell
- Born: May 28, 1822; Philadelphia, Pennsylvania
- Died: December 20, 1894 (aged 72); Los Angeles County, California
- Occupations: American banker, merchant and politician

Edward C. Bosbyshell (May 28, 1822 – December 20, 1894) was a politician in Iowa and California, where he was a member of the Los Angeles Common Council, the governing body of that city. He was also a merchant and a banker.

== Background ==
Bosbyshell was born in Philadelphia, Pennsylvania, in 1822 and spent some of his early adult life in Calhoun County, Illinois, "where, in an overflow of the rivers, he lost his entire property." He made a "new start" in Glenwood, Iowa, as a merchant. He was also on the school board there and was a county judge, as well as mayor.

He came to Los Angeles in 1884 and was one of the founders of the Southern California Bank. He was a member of the First Congregational Church of Los Angeles.

Bosbyshell was a two-term member of the Los Angeles Common Council, representing the 3rd Ward, beginning on December 12, 1887, and ending on February 21, 1889. In 1893 he was a member of the Board of Police Commissioners.

He and his wife celebrated their 50th wedding anniversary in 1894. They had a son, Edward P. Bosbyshell.

== Death and interment ==
Bosbyshell died in Los Angeles County on December 20, 1894, and was buried at the Angeles Rosedale Cemetery in Los Angeles, California.
