= Vincent A. Hoover =

American politician

- Born: 1824; Switzerland
- Died: June 29, 1883 (aged 58–59)
- Term: 1859–1865
- Board member of: Los Angeles Common Council

Vincent A. Hoover (c. 1824–1883) was a bank director, a land developer and a member of the Los Angeles Common Council, the governing body of that city, in the mid-19th century.

Hoover came to Los Angeles about the age of thirty with his mother and his father, Dr. Leonce Hoover, whose original name was Huber; the elder

Huber was born in Switzerland and had studied medicine at the University of Paris.

The Hoovers had two daughters as well; one of them, Mary A., married Samuel Briggs. "For a while the Hoovers lived on the Wolfskill Ranch, after which they had a vineyard in the neighborhood of" what was he Cudahy Packing Company. Leonce was one of the early winemakers in Southern California.

In July 1874, Hoover was one of the first directors of the Los Angeles County Bank, which opened in facilities just vacated by the Farmers and Merchants Bank of Los Angeles. He served on the Los Angeles Common Council in 1859–60, 1860–61 and 1864-65.

As a land developer, the first residential subdivision within the boundaries of University Park was recorded in May 1875 by Vincent A. Hoover: Hoover Tract (originally it extended from Adams Boulevard on the south to 23rd Street on the north along the west side of Toberman Street). This proved to be an optimistic gesture, for serious suburban settlement within the district did not get underway until 1887, and lots in the Hoover Tract went largely unsold.

Hoover died on June 29, 1883, being unmarried at the time. He had a brother, Charles B. Hoover of New Albany, Indiana, and a sister, Mary Ann Hoover. His estate, mostly in real property, was valued at "about $32,000."

== Legacy ==
Hoover Street, Los Angeles, is named for this family. A biography of Vincent A. Hoover was begun by editor, writer and researcher Dale L. Morgan of the Bancroft Library, and his papers are kept in the Morgan collection there. A diary that Hoover kept in 1849 is at the Huntington Library in San Marino, California.
