= James Velsir =

American politician

James Velsir was a fireman and politician in 19th century Los Angeles, California.

== Personal ==
Velsir came to Los Angeles from Nevada around 1877.

He was junior warden of the Pentalpha Lodge No. 202 of the Free and Accepted Masons organization in 1882.

Velsir was arrested by two policemen after a struggle in front of a city fire station on August 23, 1889, on a charge of assault in an attempt to murder his ex-wife after he attacked her in her home at 422 Buena Vista Street (today's North Broadway) and beat her severely. They had one child, a son.

== Vocation ==
He was a master mechanic for the Southern Pacific railroad in Los Angeles in 1882, a city fireman in the 1880s and 1890s.

=== Fire department ===
In 1885 Velsir was expelled as the engineer of Thirty-Eights Engine Company No. 1 "for conduct unbecoming a fireman," and the members of that company submitted a petition to the Common Council requesting his dismissal.

In March 1899 the Los Angeles Times reported that:

A mistaken idea as to what was due him from his subordinates and an effort to have disciplined others when he himself was at fault, cost Engineer James Velsir of Engine Company No. 4 of the Fire Department, one-half a month's pay yesterday. He was fined $50 by the Board of Police Commissioners, and that he was not dismissed from the department was only because his inattention to duty did not result in any serious loss of property at a fire.

It was noted that Velsir had not answered a fire alarm with the rest of the company because he was breakfasting in his home a few blocks from the station. When he later found the firemen cleaning the engine upon their return from the call, he was "so angry that he preferred written charges against the driver of the engine, D.W. Trowbridge, for not having called him from his residence." The commissioners, however, found that Velsir had been guilty of "inattention to duty."

In July 1900 Velsir was suspended from duty after he was found to be intoxicated in the firehouse at the corner of Washington and Hoover streets. He was discharged on August 8, 1900, despite a "strong political effort to save him."

=== Investments ===
Velsir was an investor and a director of the Alosta Water Company, which was being developed in 1887 to serve a new town called Alosta in the San Gabriel Valley. It was described as a section of Azusa being developed by former Sheriff George Gard. He was a partner with J.J. Law in the California Coal and Wood Company, which went bankrupt in 1889.

=== Common Council ===
Velsir was a member of the Los Angeles Common Council, the legislative branch of city government, from the 1st Ward in 1884–85. As a member of the Common Council], in 1885 Velsir was active in a successful campaign to dismiss Police Chief Edward McCarthy. In April of that year he "saved his seat by showing up in Council" after three consecutive absences.
