= Heinrich Dockweiler =

American politician

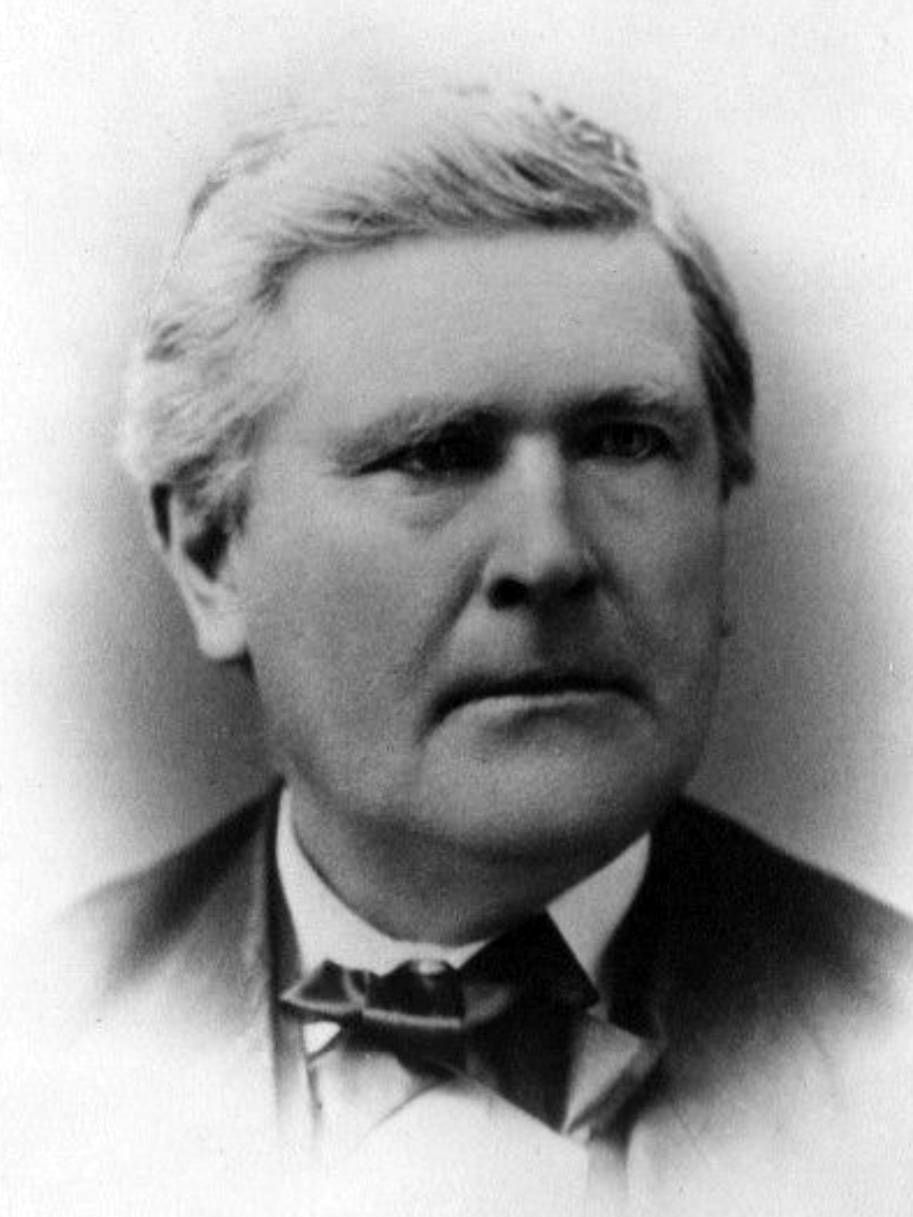

Member of the Los Angeles Common Council for the 3rd ward
- In office December 9, 1870 – September 28, 1871
- In office June 8, 1871 – December 18, 1874

Personal details
- Born: 1824 Contwig, Kingdom of Bavaria
- Died: April 12, 1887 (aged 62–63) Los Angeles, California
- Spouse: Margaretha Sugg (m. 1861)
- Children: 4, including Isidore

Heinrich "Henry" Dockweiler (1824 – April 12, 1887) was a patriarch of pioneering family in American Los Angeles, California as it was growing from the Mexican Pueblo de Los Ángeles era of Alta California.

== Biography ==
Dockweiler was born in Contwig near Zweibrücken, in the Rheinkreis of the Kingdom of Bavaria (now in Rhineland-Palatinate). He emigrated to the United States, landing in Brooklyn. He was known commonly after emigration as Henry Dockweiler.

=== California ===
He arrived in Los Angeles in 1852.

Dockweiler married Margaretha Sugg in La Iglesia de Nuestra Señora la Reina de los Ángeles on the Los Angeles Plaza, on 13 October 1861. He and his wife had 4 sons: John Henry, Joseph, John, and Isidore.

He was opposed to slavery and secession, was one of the first 25 people in Los Angeles to support Abraham Lincoln. He was elected to serve as a member of the Los Angeles Common Council from 1870 to 1874.

Henry Dockweiler died in 1887. He was interred in the old Calvary Cemetery of Los Angeles, and later reinterred in the new Calvary Cemetery (New Calvary Catholic Cemetery) in East Los Angeles.

== See also ==
- Dockweiler State Beach
