= Richard Molony (carriage maker) =

American politician

Member of the Los Angeles Common Council for 2nd the Ward
- In office December 5, 1878 – December 5, 1879

Personal details
- Born: February 25, 1839 Syracuse, New York
- Died: April 20, 1938 (aged 99) Los Angeles, California
- Resting place: Calvary Cemetery, East Los Angeles
- Party: Progressive Democrat
- Spouse: Ellen Mulcahey (m. 1867) Catherine or Katherine Fennessy (m. 1878) Katherine Collins (m. 1897)

Richard Molony (1839–1938) was a wheelwright, a blacksmith, and a manufacturer of carriages in 19th-century Los Angeles, California, where he was a member of the Common Council, the legislative branch of the city.

== Personal ==
Molony was born February 25, 1839, in Syracuse, New York, the son of Michael Molony and Joanna Murphy Molony, both of Ireland. He was educated in the common schools in Dubuque, Iowa. During the Civil War, he voyaged to San Francisco in 1862 via the Isthmus of Panama, first settling in Bloomfield in Sonoma County. He moved to Los Angeles in 1872.

He was married three times—to Ellen Mulcahey in 1867 (died in 1875), to Catherine or Katherine Fennessy in 1878 (who died on May 2, 1895) and to Katherine Collins in 1897 (died in 1923), all born in Ireland. He had four children by his first wife—Mary Cunningham, Mark, Nellie and Clement—and four by his second—William R., Margaret, Frances and Joanna.

Molony lived with his first wife at 527 Prospect Place (now Progress Place), and his last home was at 306 South Virgil Avenue, where he lived with his three unmarried daughters. He died at the age of 99 on April 20, 1938, in the Virgil Avenue home several weeks after he fell and broke his hip. A requiem high mass was celebrated at St. Agnes Catholic Church by one of his sons, Clement Molony, pastor of the church. with burial following at Calvary Cemetery, East Los Angeles.

== Vocation ==
Molony, a wheelwright and blacksmith, built wagons and carriages in San Francisco until 1872, when he moved to Los Angeles and established his own business in the same line, on Aliso Street. He built the first patrol wagon for the Los Angeles Police Department and the first hook-and-ladder for the city fire department, becoming "the city's foremost builder of fashionable carriages". He was particularly proud of a "leather spring coach of elaborate design" for "John Bradbury, scion of one of the most prominent Los Angeles families, to take his bride, Lucy Banning, then the toast of the city, on a trip to the Bradbury mines in Mexico."

He retired from carriage-making in 1899 at the age of sixty and "went into real estate."

== Public service ==
A "progressive Democrat," Molony was elected to represent the 2nd ward on the Los Angeles Common Council in 1879 and served two years. He was appointed to the city Housing Commission in 1906, but resigned without serving. He was on the city Fire Commission in 1909 and 1910.

Molony was also a member of a citizens' committee that in 1897 proposed a new charter for the city.

In 1934 he told an interviewer that his hobby was "Democratic conventions."

== Memberships ==
He was a founding member and the first treasurer of the Los Angeles chapter of the Ancient Order of Hibernians and was a member of the Knights of Columbus.

== References and notes ==
- Access to the Los Angeles Times links may require the use of a LAPL library card.
