= Joseph Huber Sr. =

American politician

Member of the Los Angeles Common Council
- In office January 7, 1861 – May 9, 1863

President of the Los Angeles Common Council
- In office May 9, 1863 – May 6, 1865

Personal details
- Died: 1867
- Committees: Police Committee; Streets Committee; Lands Committee; Finance Committee; Water Committee

Joseph Huber Sr. (died 1867), was president of the Los Angeles, California, Common Council—the legislative arm of that city—for two years, beginning May 1863 and ending May 1865. He had earlier terms as a member, winning a seat in a special election on January 7, 1861, to replace Damien Marchesseault, who had resigned, and also serving in the 1862–63 term.
