= Elisha K. Green =

American politician (1839–1917)

Elisha K. Green (1839–1917) was an entrepreneur in Los Angeles, California, who "made a fortune out of windmills" and served for six years on the Common Council, the governing body of that city. He developed the first residential tract west of Figueroa Avenue. He was involved in a serious traffic accident in 1905.

== Personal ==
=== Family ===
Green was born August 28, 1839, in Gaines Township, Orleans County, New York, the seventh of the eleven children of Eri and Joanna Green. The family moved to Michigan when Elisha was young, and he was educated there. He taught school himself between the ages of 18 and 26. His father was one of the organizers of Kalamazoo College.

He was married in 1860 to Lomira C. Halladay. He first came to California in November 1872 and returned in May 1873 with his family.

=== Memberships ===
Green was a Republican for many years, but later in life he joined the Prohibition Party. He was a charter member of the Los Angeles Pioneer Society and a member of the Independent Church of Christ.

=== Traffic accident ===
Green was involved in a serious accident in September 1905 when he lost control of his "big Reo touring car" and the vehicle struck a worker who was oiling the streetcar tracks on First Street near Chicago Street, fracturing his skull and breaking a leg. The car then "ran into a telephone pole, destroying the machine and hurling the five occupants to the ground." They were Green and his wife, his son, Floyd, and wife, and a grandchild. Witnesses said the Reo was racing with another automobile "at a furious rate of speed," with both drivers "tooting" their horns in the midst of "many teams and vehicles." The victim was later reported to be improving.

=== Juror ===
In 1915 Green, "an old man and quite infirm," was sworn in as a juror in a criminal case involving using the mails to defraud. While the jury selection phase was still ongoing, he told the trial judge that he was certain he could not make the walk twice daily between the hotel where the jurors would stay and the courthouse. Green was excused, and the defendants' lawyers asked the judge to allow them to restore their "original privilege of peremptory challenge. The judge assented, saying it was only the second time "in the history of criminal jurisprudence in this State that the question ever arose."

=== Death ===
Green died March 11, 1917, in his home at 1504 West 8th Street, Los Angeles, of pernicious anemia, his physicians said. A service was planned at the residence, with interment to follow in Rosedale Cemetery. He was predeceased by his wife and was survived by two children, Floyd E. Green and Ruth L. Ferguson, and a brother and sister in Charlotte, Michigan.

=== Legacy ===
Green is remembered by Green Avenue, which comprised seven acres of land between 8th and 9th streets and Valencia and Union avenues. That was the first tract west of Figueroa Street, the Los Angeles Times said, adding:

For nearly forty-five years he lived on the tract, on which sheep grazed and on which chickens, ducks, turkeys and live stock were raised by him for many years [even] after the street cars were passing his door.

== Vocation ==
He was a manufacturer of windmills, pumps and engines, selling his first windmill to developer Prudent Beaudry. Green retired from active business in 1896, after, it was said, "he made a fortune out of windmills."

== Public service ==
Green represented the 3rd Ward on the Los Angeles Common Council beginning December 8, 1876, and ending on December 10, 1881.

== References and notes ==
Access to the Los Angeles Times links may require the use of a library card.
