= Hiram Sinsabaugh =

American private banker and politician

Member of the Los Angeles Common Council from the 5th ward
- In office December 9, 1884 – December 13, 1886
- In office December 12, 1887 – February 21, 1889

Personal details
- Born: c. 1832 Norwich, Ohio
- Died: May 19, 1892 (aged 59–60) Los Angeles, California
- Party: Republican

Hiram Sinsabaugh (c. 1832 – May 19, 1892) was a Methodist Episcopal minister and banker who served on the Los Angeles, California, Common Council, the legislative branch of the city, in the 19th century.

== Personal ==
Sinsabaugh was born about 1832 in Norwich, Ohio. Because of ill health, he moved in 1873 to Denver, Colorado, and in 1880 he came to Los Angeles on a visit and returned the following year with his family.

He died May 19, 1892, at the age of sixty, with the cause attributed to "a combination of consumption and Bright's disease." A funeral was held in his residence, 225 Loma Drive, near today's Belmont High School, followed by private burial.

== Vocation ==
Before moving to Los Angeles, Sinsabaugh was a Methodist Episcopal Church preacher in Ohio and Pennsylvania. After settling in California, he became the president of the Broadway Bank, which opened in March 1890 on the corner of Broadway and Sixth Street.

== Memberships ==
Sinsabaugh was a vice-president of the University Place Improvement Society, founded in 1887 to protect the interests of that residential area near the University of Southern California. He was also a member of the Coeur de Leon Commandery, Knights Templar.

== Public service ==
Sinsabaugh was elected to represent the 5th Ward on the Los Angeles Common Council, the legislative branch of the city government, for three one-year terms between December 9, 1884, and December 10, 1888, and for a term ending February 21, 1889, shortened because of the institution of a new city charter.

In 1887, Sinsabaugh ran for a Board of Freeholders to write the new charter for Los Angeles, on a ticket pledged to assure Sunday closing of saloons. He was elected and helped to write the charter.

== Additional sources ==
• Denver, Colorado, City Directory, 1876, page 213
