= Murray Morrison =

American politician (1820–1871)

Murray Morrison (1820–1871) was a California State Assembly member, president of the Los Angeles Common Council and a judge of the Superior Court.

== Biography ==
Morrison was born in 1820 in Southern Illinois and graduated from the Roman Catholic college of St. Louis, Missouri. He migrated to California in 1849, where he settled in Sacramento and set up a law practice. In 1850 he was called "Maj. Murray Morrison" and was on a committee of managers for a Fourth of July celebration, the first one after statehood." In Sacramento, Morrison eventually partnered with Todd Robinson, but later moved to San Francisco, where his business partner was J.P. Hoge.

His brothers were Don Morrison, a member of the U.S. Congress from Illinois, and H.F. Morrison, judge of the 4th Judicial District of California. Murray Morrison was married in 1862 to Jennie White, the daughter of Thomas J. White, speaker of the Assembly in the first California Legislature.

Murray Morrison moved to Los Angeles in 1858 and died there of "an attack of erysipelas in the face" on December 18, 1871, leaving his wife, Jennie. She survived him by only six days.

== Business transactions ==
In February 1861, while an Assembly member, Morrison "learned of the willingness of Eastern capitalists" to build a railroad between Los Angeles and the harbor at Wilmington or San Pedro, south of the city. within 18 months, provided the county would subscribe $100,000 and the city $50,000 to pay for it. He and his partner, Abel Stearns, secured a franchise to build the line from Los Angeles to the port at San Pedro, but it was not possible to raise the promised money because of the Civil War, and the project was halted.

== Public service ==
On May 7, 1866, Morrison was elected to the Los Angeles Common Council and was named to its presidency, where he served until June 1, 1868, when he resigned from the council.
