= The Disappearance of Aimee =

- VHS box art
- Genre: Biography; Drama
- Based on: Disappearance of Aimee Semple McPherson
- Written by: John McGreevey
- Directed by: Anthony Harvey
- Starring: Faye Dunaway; Bette Davis; James Sloyan; James Woods
- Music by: Steve Byrne
- Country of origin: United States
- Original language: English

Production
- Executive producer: Thomas W. Moore
- Producer: Paul Leaf
- Production locations: Universal Studios - 100 Universal City Plaza, Universal City, California
- Cinematography: James Crabe
- Editors: Arline Garson; Jerry Greenberg
- Running time: 100 minutes
- Production companies: Hallmark Hall of Fame; Tomorrow Entertainment

Original release
- Network: NBC
- Release: November 17, 1976

The Disappearance of Aimee is a 1976 American made-for-television biographical drama film directed by Anthony Harvey and starring Faye Dunaway as the evangelist Aimee Semple McPherson, co-starring Bette Davis, James Sloyan and James Woods. The film originally premiered as a presentation of Hallmark Hall of Fame on NBC on November 17, 1976.

== Plot ==
Based on true events, the film attempts to investigate the mysterious disappearance of Aimee Semple McPherson in 1926 and the court case that followed her safe return after she was missing for four weeks.

== Cast ==
- Faye Dunaway as Aimee Semple McPherson
- Bette Davis as Minnie Kennedy
- James Sloyan as District Attorney Asa Keyes
- James Woods as Assistant District Attorney Joseph Ryan
- John Lehne as Captain Cline
- Lelia Goldoni as Emma Shaffer
- Severn Darden as S.I. Gilbert
- William Jordan as Kenneth Ormiston

== Mention in Bette Davis Memoir ==
In her memoir This 'n That (1987, Berkley Pub Group), Bette Davis recounted several anecdotes about working on The Disappearance of Aimee. Among them was that her co-star, Faye Dunaway, was one of the most unprofessional people she had ever worked with. Davis stated that Dunaway would show up hours late, not knowing her lines, and being generally difficult. For one of the scenes in the un-air-conditioned tabernacle, over 1800 unpaid extras (locals who had been promised a box lunch and a chance to be in a movie) were left for hours awaiting Dunaway's arrival. When they finally began leaving, Davis rushed to the pulpit and began singing "I've Written a Letter to Daddy," a song from her wildly popular 1962 film What Ever Happened to Baby Jane?. Hearing her, many returned to their seats in the pews.

Appropriately, Dunaway would go on to portray Davis’s heyday peer and rival, Joan Crawford, in the 1981 cult classic film Mommie Dearest.
