= Theodore Arlington Bell =

American politician

Theodore Bell
- Portrait by C. M. Bell c. 1903

Member of the U.S. House of Representatives from California's 2nd district
- In office March 4, 1903 – March 4, 1905
- Preceded by: Samuel D. Woods
- Succeeded by: Duncan E. McKinlay

District Attorney of Napa County
- In office 1895–1903

Personal details
- Born: Theodore Arlington Bell; July 25, 1872 Vallejo, California, U.S.
- Died: September 4, 1922 (aged 50) San Rafael, California, U.S.
- Resting place: Odd Fellows Cemetery; St. Helena, California, U.S.
- Party: Democratic (before 1921); Republican (1921–1922)
- Other political affiliations: Independent (1918)

Theodore Arlington Bell (July 25, 1872 – September 4, 1922) was an American lawyer and politician who served one term as a Democratic congressman from California from 1903 to 1905.

== Biography ==
Born in Vallejo, California on July 25, 1872 to Charles E. Bell and Catherine J. Bell (née Mills), he and his family moved to St. Helena, California in 1876 where he attended primary school at the Crystal Spring school.

At 18, he received a certificate to teach, doing so for a year and a half in northern Napa County, during which time he continued to study law.

=== Early political career ===
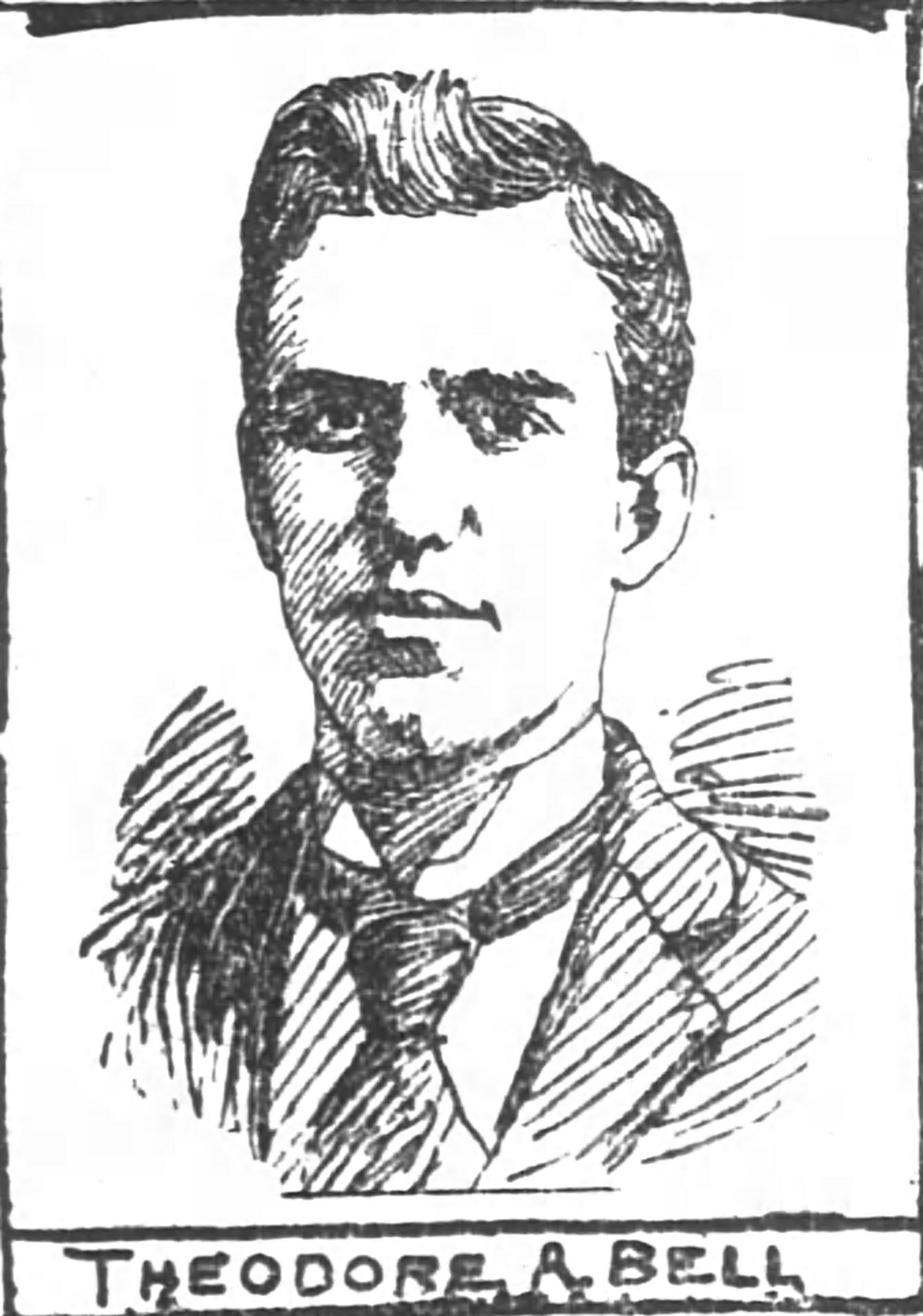
San Francisco Chronicle illustration of Bell as District Attorney, 1895

After his admission to the bar on July 25, 1893 (his 25th birthday), he began his political career as District Attorney of Napa County, California from 1895 to 1903. During this time, he was married to his wife, Anna Marie Muller, with whom he had one daughter, Maurine.

=== Congress ===
With the backing of former San Francisco mayor and future U.S. Senator James D. Phelan, Bell was elected to the 58th Congress (1903-1905) representing California's 2nd district.

While serving, he was a member of the House Irrigation of Arid Lands Committee. In the 1904 election, he was defeated by Republican Duncan E. McKinlay.

=== Later career ===
He went on to run for Governor of California in 1906, 1910 and 1918, losing twice as a Democrat with around 38% and 40% of the vote and once as an independent with 36%. In his closest election in 1906 he was only 2.6% behind Republican James Gillett. He was the Democratic candidate for U.S. Senate in 1905, but lost to Republican Frank P. Flint. He was a delegate to the 1908 Democratic National Convention, where he gave William Jennings Bryan's nomination speech, and the 1912 Democratic National Convention before later switching parties to become a Republican in 1921.

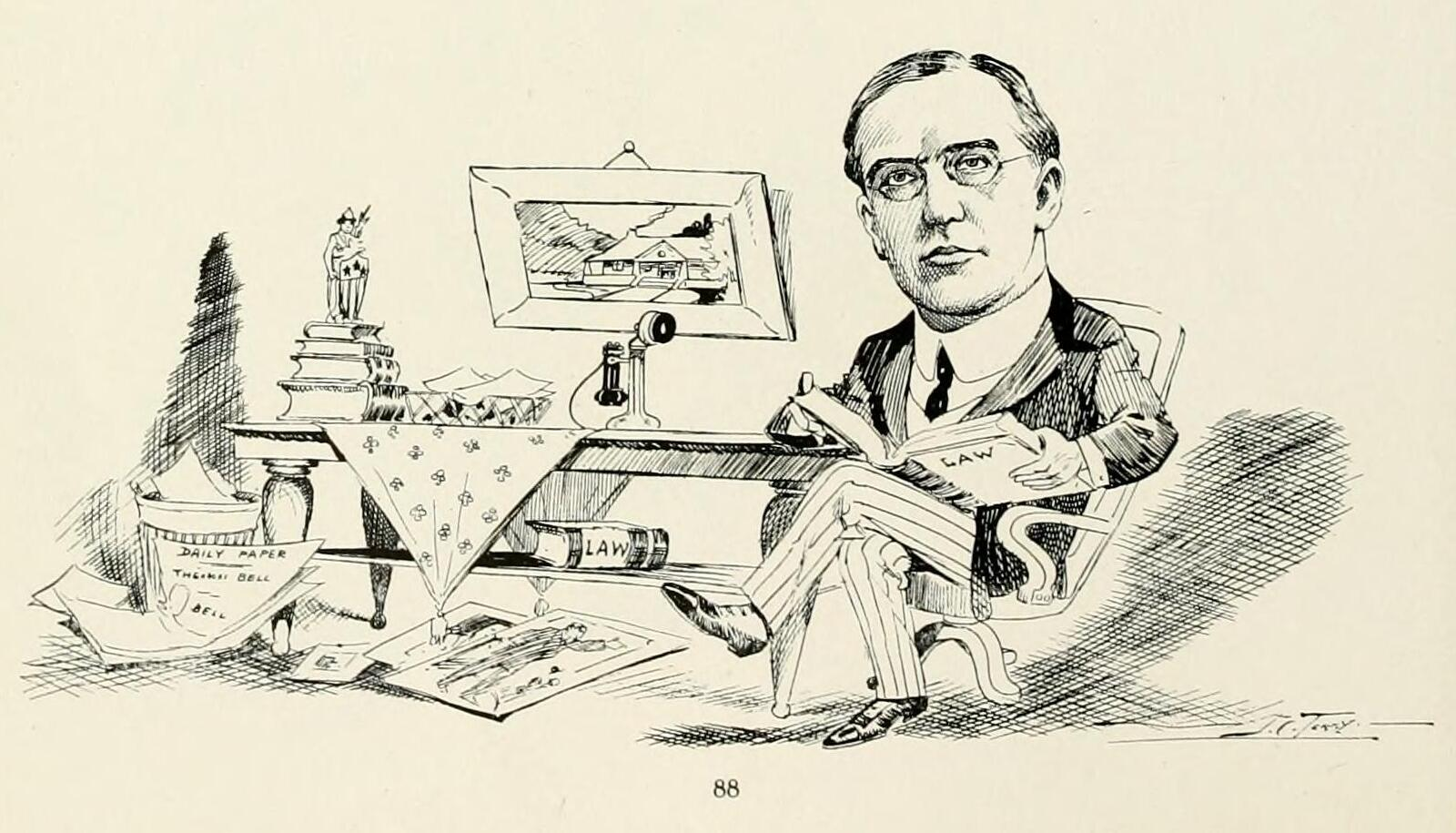
Caricature of Bell, 1912

Though Bell himself, representing California wine country, was not a prohibitionist, his mentor Phelan was a strong teetotaler. To accommodate both sides, he lobbied for a tax increase on wines with sugar, which came from out of state. In doing so, he made a move to regulate the consumption of alcohol, which would not harm local vintners but would increase tax revenue and decrease the likelihood of prohibition.

=== Death and burial ===
On September 4, 1922, he was killed in a car crash in Marin County, California. He is interred at Odd Fellows Cemetery in St. Helena.

== Electoral history ==
1902 United States House of Representatives elections in California, 2nd district
| Party | Candidate | Votes | % |
|---|---|---|---|
| Democratic | Theodore A. Bell | 21,536 | 49.2 |
| Republican | Frank Coombs (incumbent) | 21,181 | 48.3 |
| Socialist | G. H. Rogers | 731 | 1.7 |
| Prohibition | W. P. Fassett | 367 | 0.8 |
| Total votes | | 43,815 | 100.0 |
| Turnout | | | |
| Democratic gain from Republican | | | |

1904 United States House of Representatives elections in California, 2nd district
| Party | Candidate | Votes | % |
|---|---|---|---|
| Republican | Duncan E. McKinlay (incumbent) | 22,873 | 49.2 |
| Democratic | Theodore A. Bell | 21,640 | 46.6 |
| Socialist | J. H. White | 1,524 | 3.3 |
| Prohibition | Eli P. LaCell | 431 | 0.9 |
| Total votes | | 46,468 | 100.0 |
| Turnout | | | |
| Republican gain from Democratic | | | |

U.S. House of Representatives
| Preceded by Samuel D. Woods | Member of the U.S. House of Representatives from California's 2nd congressional district 1903–1905 | Succeeded by Duncan E. McKinlay |
Party political offices
| Preceded by Franklin Knight Lane | Democratic nominee for Governor of California; 1906, 1910 | Succeeded by J. B. Curtin |
| Preceded by John Sharp Williams | Keynote Speaker at the Democratic National Convention; 1908 | Succeeded by Alton B. Parker |
| Preceded by James Rolph; Disqualified | Democratic nominee for Governor of California; 1918 | Succeeded by Thomas L. Woolwine |
