= 1922 California gubernatorial election =

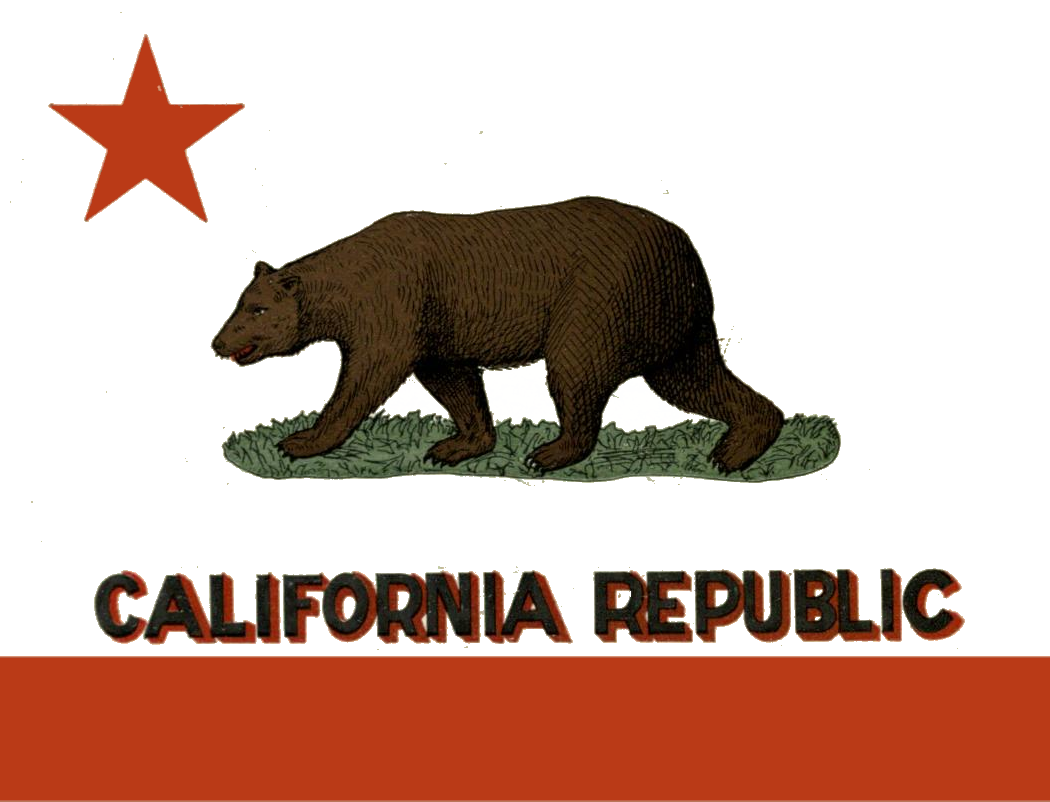
- November 7, 1922
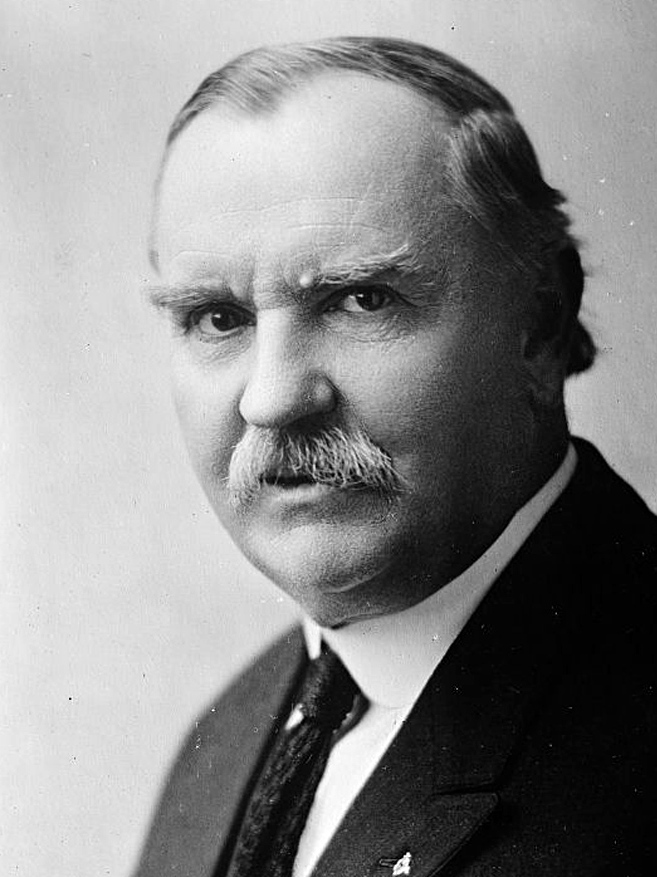

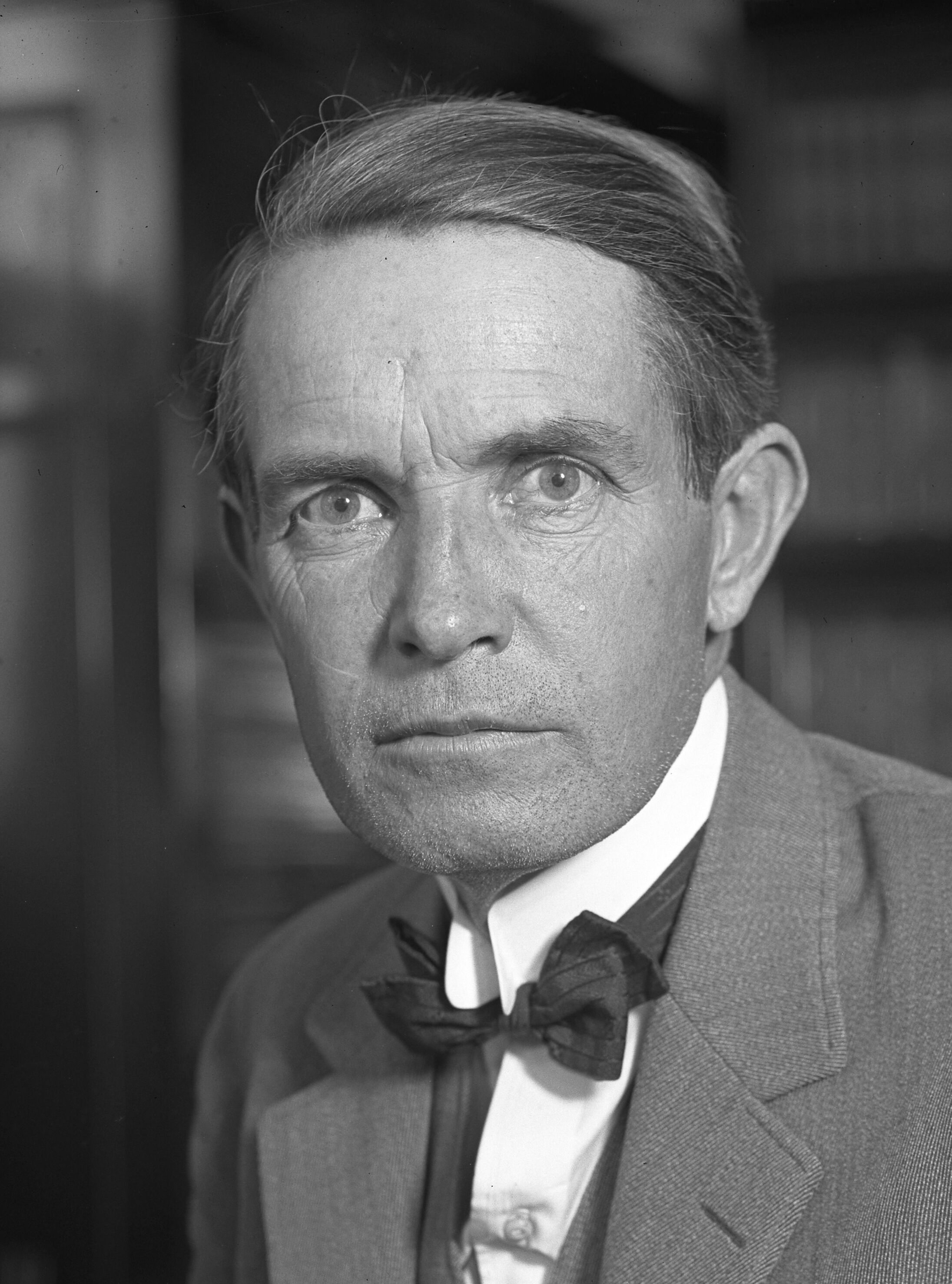
| Nominee | Friend William Richardson | Thomas Lee Woolwine |
| Party | Republican | Democratic |
| Popular vote | 576,445 | 347,530 |
| Percentage | 59.69% | 35.98% |
- County results Richardson: 40–50% 50–60% 60–70% 70–80% Woolwine: 40–50% 50–60%
Governor before election
William Stephens
Republican
Elected Governor
Friend Richardson
Republican

The 1922 California gubernatorial election was held on November 7, 1922. Republican state treasurer Friend Richardson easily defeated Los Angeles County district attorney Thomas L. Woolwine. This was the first of three consecutive elections in which the incumbent lost in the Republican primary.

In the Republican primary, incumbent governor William Stephens faced a challenge from Richardson, who ran on a conservative platform opposed to the prior decade of progressive Republican rule in the state. Richardson won by nearly 25,000 votes. Although Stephens won the Prohibition Party primary, he was unable to accept the nomination under the Hawson amendment, having lost his own party's primary. In the Democratic primary, Woolwine defeated Mattison B. Jones by a large margin of over 30,000 votes.

Richardson would defeat Woolwine in the general election by over 200,000 votes. His 59.69% vote share was the largest yet achieved by a gubernatorial candidate in California, though that record would be broken in the next election. As governor, Richardson would roll back many of the progressive reforms of Stephens and his predecessor, Hiram Johnson.

== Primaries ==
=== Republican primary ===
Incumbent Republican governor William Stephens, who had succeeded Hiram Johnson upon his resignation in 1917 and then was elected to a term of his own in 1918, sought a second term as governor. By that time, Republicans had grown more conservative than the years prior, pushing against Progressives like Stephens. California State Treasurer Friend Richardson, previously a Progressive in 1914, campaigned on a conservative platform and utilizing a fatigue on Progressive politics in the state. In the Republican primary, Stephens lost to Richardson by 25,000 votes.

Republican primary results
| Party | Candidate | Votes | % |
|---|---|---|---|
| Republican | Friend William Richardson | 286,442 | 52.27% |
| Republican | William D. Stephens (incumbent) | 261,521 | 47.73% |
| Total votes | | 547,963 | 100.00% |

=== Democratic primary ===
Los Angeles County District Attorney Thomas L. Woolwine and attorney Mattison B. Jones ran in the Democratic ticket. Woolwine defeated Jones in the primary.

Democratic primary results
| Party | Candidate | Votes | % |
|---|---|---|---|
| Democratic | Thomas Lee Woolwine | 75,868 | 60.40% |
| Democratic | Mattison B. Jones | 45,631 | 36.11% |
| Democratic | Friend William Richardson (write-in) | 2,313 | 1.84% |
| Democratic | William D. Stephens (write-in) | 2,061 | 1.64% |
| Total votes | | 125,603 | 100.00% |

=== Prohibition primary ===
Governor Stephens and Jones cross-filed in the Prohibition primary, but due to Stephens not winning the Republican primary, the Prohibition Party was unable to run a candidate in the race.

Prohibition primary results
| Party | Candidate | Votes | % |
|---|---|---|---|
| Prohibition | William D. Stephens | 5,632 | 66.38% |
| Prohibition | Mattison B. Jones | 2,289 | 26.98% |
| Prohibition | Friend William Richardson (write-in) | 563 | 6.64% |
| Total votes | | 8,484 | 100.00% |

=== Socialist primary ===
Socialist primary results
| Party | Candidate | Votes | % |
|---|---|---|---|
| Socialist | Alexander Horr | 6,719 | 100.00% |
| Total votes | | 6,719 | 100.00% |

== General election results ==
1922 California gubernatorial election
| Party | Candidate | Votes | % | ±% |
|---|---|---|---|---|
| Republican | Friend William Richardson | 576,445 | 59.69% | +3.41% |
| Democratic | Thomas Lee Woolwine | 347,530 | 35.98% | +35.98% |
| Socialist | Alexander Horr | 41,418 | 4.29% | +0.08% |
| | Scattering | 394 | 0.04% | |
| Majority | | 228,915 | 23.70% | |
| Total votes | | 965,787 | 100.00% | |
| Republican hold | | Swing | +3.90% | |

=== Results by county ===
| County | Friend William Richardson Republican | | Thomas Lee Woolwine Democratic | | Alexander Horr Socialist | | Scattering Write-in | | Margin | | Total votes cast |
| County | # | % | # | % | # | % | # | % | # | % | Total votes cast |
|---|---|---|---|---|---|---|---|---|---|---|---|
| Alameda | 60,130 | 61.38% | 33,250 | 33.94% | 4,584 | 4.68% | 0 | 0.00% | 26,880 | 27.44% | 97,964 |
| Alpine | 45 | 77.59% | 12 | 20.69% | 0 | 0.00% | 1 | 1.72% | 33 | 56.90% | 58 |
| Amador | 1,111 | 49.80% | 1,082 | 48.50% | 37 | 1.66% | 1 | 0.04% | 29 | 1.30% | 2,231 |
| Butte | 5,493 | 56.52% | 3,922 | 40.36% | 303 | 3.12% | 0 | 0.00% | 1,571 | 16.17% | 9,718 |
| Calaveras | 1,325 | 56.89% | 908 | 38.99% | 94 | 4.04% | 2 | 0.09% | 417 | 17.90% | 2,329 |
| Colusa | 1,723 | 53.29% | 1,469 | 45.44% | 41 | 1.27% | 0 | 0.00% | 254 | 7.86% | 3,233 |
| Contra Costa | 8,860 | 54.22% | 6,620 | 40.51% | 862 | 5.27% | 0 | 0.00% | 2,240 | 13.71% | 16,342 |
| Del Norte | 653 | 65.63% | 291 | 29.25% | 51 | 5.13% | 0 | 0.00% | 362 | 36.38% | 995 |
| El Dorado | 1,308 | 46.01% | 1,438 | 50.58% | 97 | 3.41% | 0 | 0.00% | -130 | -4.57% | 2,843 |
| Fresno | 19,354 | 60.37% | 11,164 | 34.82% | 1,540 | 4.80% | 0 | 0.00% | 8,190 | 25.55% | 32,058 |
| Glenn | 2,659 | 66.88% | 1,257 | 31.61% | 59 | 1.48% | 1 | 0.03% | 1,402 | 35.26% | 3,976 |
| Humboldt | 7,984 | 73.91% | 2,345 | 21.71% | 474 | 4.39% | 0 | 0.00% | 5,639 | 52.20% | 10,803 |
| Imperial | 4,376 | 63.17% | 2,328 | 33.61% | 223 | 3.22% | 0 | 0.00% | 2,048 | 29.57% | 6,927 |
| Inyo | 1,678 | 66.27% | 692 | 27.33% | 160 | 6.32% | 2 | 0.08% | 986 | 38.94% | 2,532 |
| Kern | 9,706 | 53.90% | 6,970 | 38.71% | 1,325 | 7.36% | 7 | 0.04% | 2,736 | 15.19% | 18,008 |
| Kings | 3,550 | 58.65% | 2,304 | 38.06% | 199 | 3.29% | 0 | 0.00% | 1,246 | 20.58% | 6,053 |
| Lake | 951 | 57.29% | 669 | 40.30% | 40 | 2.41% | 0 | 0.00% | 282 | 16.99% | 1,660 |
| Lassen | 1,138 | 50.87% | 1,026 | 45.86% | 73 | 3.26% | 0 | 0.00% | 112 | 5.01% | 2,237 |
| Los Angeles | 169,563 | 66.06% | 74,892 | 29.18% | 12,072 | 4.70% | 146 | 0.06% | 94,671 | 36.88% | 256,673 |
| Madera | 2,031 | 53.62% | 1,575 | 41.58% | 181 | 4.78% | 1 | 0.03% | 456 | 12.04% | 3,788 |
| Marin | 5,211 | 56.49% | 3,738 | 40.52% | 276 | 2.99% | 0 | 0.00% | 1,473 | 15.97% | 9,225 |
| Mariposa | 456 | 45.92% | 496 | 49.95% | 41 | 4.13% | 0 | 0.00% | -40 | -4.03% | 993 |
| Mendocino | 3,531 | 57.59% | 2,380 | 38.82% | 220 | 3.59% | 0 | 0.00% | 1,151 | 18.77% | 6,131 |
| Merced | 3,550 | 57.89% | 2,311 | 37.69% | 268 | 4.37% | 3 | 0.05% | 1,239 | 20.21% | 6,132 |
| Modoc | 1,110 | 59.90% | 696 | 37.56% | 47 | 2.54% | 0 | 0.00% | 414 | 22.34% | 1,853 |
| Mono | 221 | 67.38% | 86 | 26.22% | 21 | 6.40% | 0 | 0.00% | 135 | 41.16% | 328 |
| Monterey | 4,145 | 57.90% | 2,826 | 39.47% | 188 | 2.63% | 0 | 0.00% | 1,319 | 18.42% | 7,159 |
| Napa | 3,541 | 49.64% | 3,401 | 47.67% | 182 | 2.55% | 10 | 0.14% | 140 | 1.96% | 7,134 |
| Nevada | 1,959 | 54.33% | 1,478 | 40.99% | 169 | 4.69% | 0 | 0.00% | 481 | 13.34% | 3,606 |
| Orange | 15,137 | 75.01% | 4,351 | 21.56% | 684 | 3.39% | 8 | 0.04% | 10,786 | 53.45% | 20,180 |
| Placer | 2,817 | 49.01% | 2,702 | 47.01% | 229 | 3.98% | 0 | 0.00% | 115 | 2.00% | 5,748 |
| Plumas | 580 | 46.14% | 559 | 44.47% | 118 | 9.39% | 0 | 0.00% | 21 | 1.67% | 1,257 |
| Riverside | 10,351 | 75.86% | 2,921 | 21.41% | 371 | 2.72% | 2 | 0.01% | 7,430 | 54.45% | 13,645 |
| Sacramento | 14,530 | 49.98% | 13,474 | 46.35% | 1,033 | 3.55% | 35 | 0.12% | 1,056 | 3.63% | 29,072 |
| San Benito | 1,782 | 58.99% | 1,165 | 38.56% | 74 | 2.45% | 0 | 0.00% | 617 | 20.42% | 3,021 |
| San Bernardino | 13,699 | 66.14% | 5,566 | 26.87% | 1,448 | 6.99% | 0 | 0.00% | 8,133 | 39.27% | 20,713 |
| San Diego | 22,792 | 69.29% | 8,271 | 25.14% | 1,823 | 5.54% | 8 | 0.02% | 14,521 | 44.14% | 32,894 |
| San Francisco | 56,302 | 42.58% | 70,464 | 53.29% | 5,336 | 4.04% | 123 | 0.09% | -14,162 | -10.71% | 132,225 |
| San Joaquin | 12,567 | 60.23% | 7,539 | 36.13% | 758 | 3.63% | 0 | 0.00% | 5,028 | 24.10% | 20,864 |
| San Luis Obispo | 4,344 | 62.60% | 2,185 | 31.49% | 400 | 5.76% | 10 | 0.14% | 2,159 | 31.11% | 6,939 |
| San Mateo | 6,227 | 50.20% | 5,658 | 45.61% | 508 | 4.10% | 11 | 0.09% | 569 | 4.59% | 12,404 |
| Santa Barbara | 6,754 | 68.06% | 2,873 | 28.95% | 295 | 2.97% | 1 | 0.01% | 3,881 | 39.11% | 9,923 |
| Santa Clara | 17,977 | 63.64% | 9,484 | 33.57% | 787 | 2.79% | 0 | 0.00% | 8,493 | 30.07% | 28,248 |
| Santa Cruz | 5,789 | 66.56% | 2,591 | 29.79% | 318 | 3.66% | 0 | 0.00% | 3,198 | 36.77% | 8,698 |
| Shasta | 2,659 | 51.77% | 2,272 | 44.24% | 205 | 3.99% | 0 | 0.00% | 387 | 7.54% | 5,136 |
| Sierra | 320 | 54.05% | 251 | 42.40% | 20 | 3.38% | 1 | 0.17% | 69 | 11.66% | 592 |
| Siskiyou | 2,922 | 50.84% | 2,487 | 43.27% | 338 | 5.88% | 0 | 0.00% | 435 | 7.57% | 5,747 |
| Solano | 5,168 | 47.51% | 5,343 | 49.12% | 366 | 3.36% | 0 | 0.00% | -175 | -1.61% | 10,877 |
| Sonoma | 9,004 | 55.45% | 6,748 | 41.55% | 487 | 3.00% | 0 | 0.00% | 2,256 | 13.89% | 16,239 |
| Stanislaus | 8,997 | 67.18% | 3,831 | 28.61% | 547 | 4.08% | 17 | 0.13% | 5,166 | 38.58% | 13,392 |
| Sutter | 1,728 | 59.88% | 1,107 | 38.36% | 51 | 1.77% | 0 | 0.00% | 621 | 21.52% | 2,886 |
| Tehama | 2,528 | 64.08% | 1,264 | 32.04% | 153 | 3.88% | 0 | 0.00% | 1,264 | 32.04% | 3,945 |
| Trinity | 597 | 56.80% | 377 | 35.87% | 77 | 7.33% | 0 | 0.00% | 220 | 20.93% | 1,051 |
| Tulare | 11,978 | 69.62% | 4,640 | 26.97% | 586 | 3.41% | 0 | 0.00% | 7,338 | 42.65% | 17,204 |
| Tuolumne | 1,709 | 51.06% | 1,445 | 43.17% | 191 | 5.71% | 2 | 0.06% | 264 | 7.89% | 3,347 |
| Ventura | 5,145 | 66.24% | 2,377 | 30.60% | 243 | 3.13% | 2 | 0.03% | 2,768 | 35.64% | 7,767 |
| Yolo | 2,964 | 54.59% | 2,375 | 43.74% | 91 | 1.68% | 0 | 0.00% | 589 | 10.85% | 5,430 |
| Yuba | 1,716 | 51.16% | 1,584 | 47.23% | 54 | 1.61% | 0 | 0.00% | 132 | 3.94% | 3,354 |
| Total | 576,445 | 59.69% | 347,530 | 35.98% | 41,418 | 4.29% | 394 | 0.04% | 228,915 | 23.70% | 965,787 |

==== Counties that flipped from Independent to Republican ====
- Marin
- Napa
- Sonoma

==== Counties that flipped from Independent to Democratic ====
- San Francisco
- Solano

==== Counties that flipped from Republican to Democratic ====
- El Dorado
- Mariposa
