= 1918 California gubernatorial election =

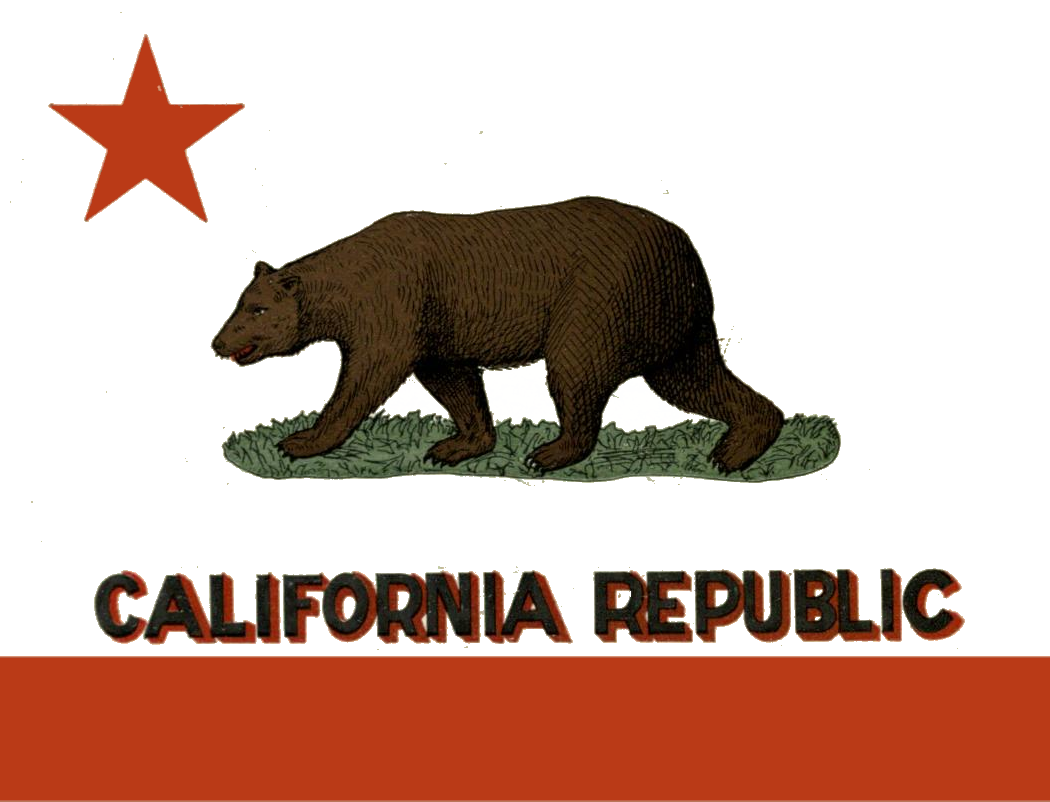
- November 5, 1918
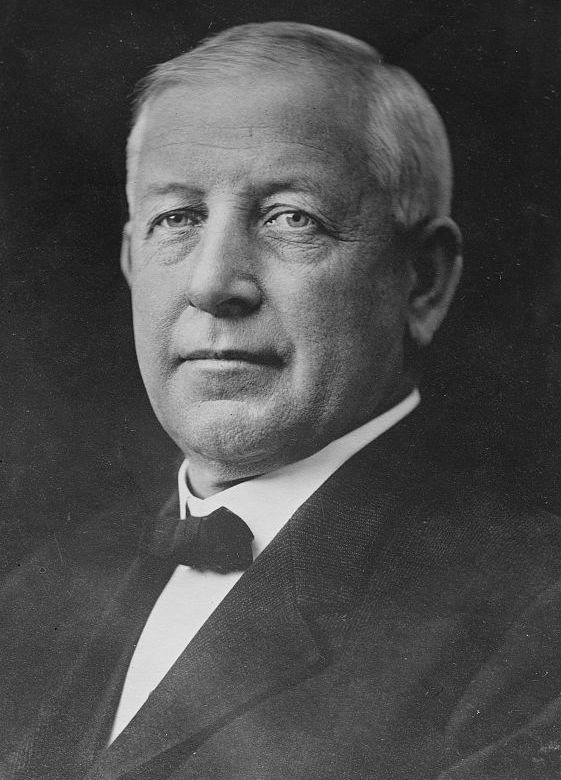

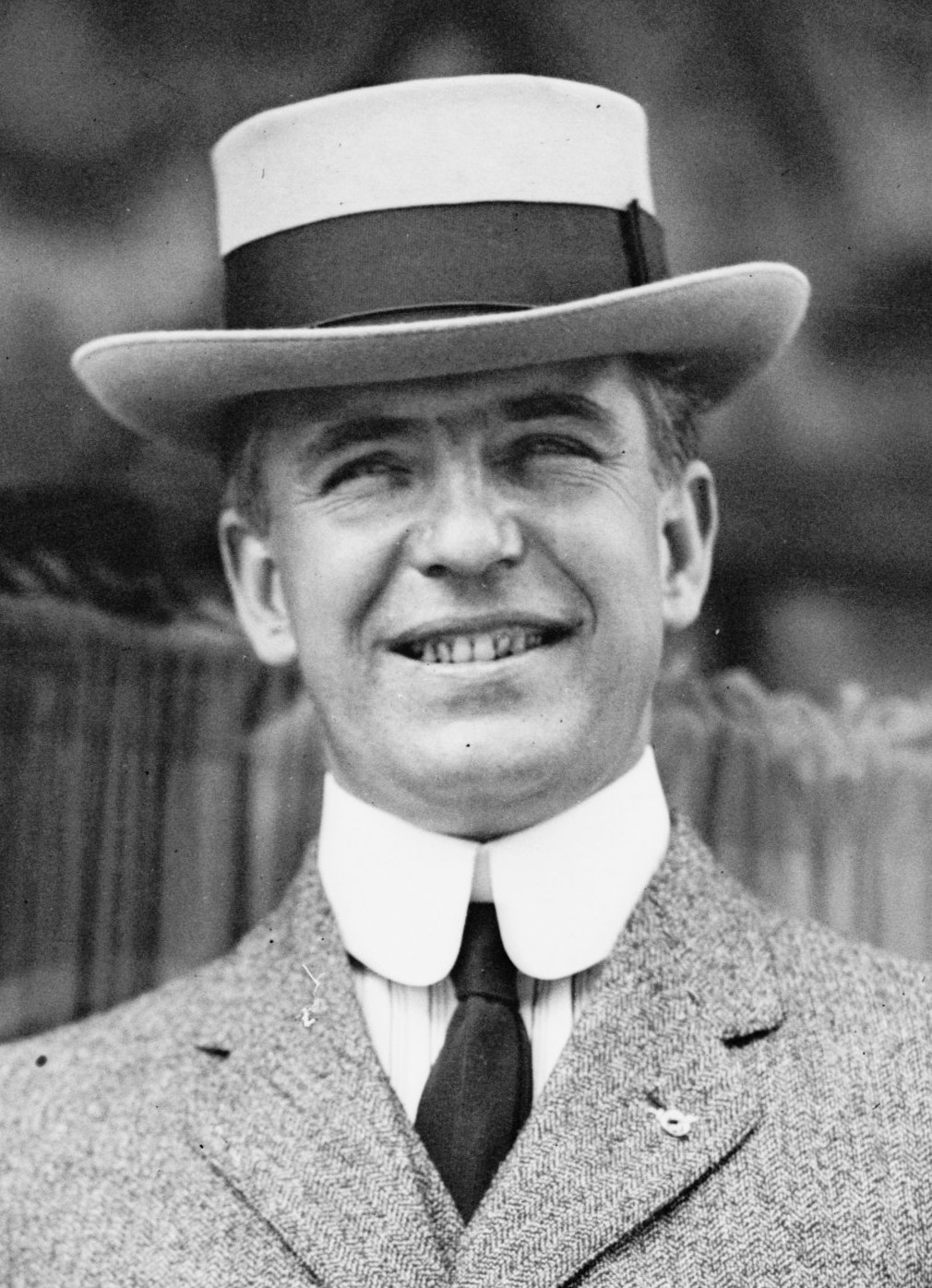
Nominee	William Stephens	Theodore Arlington Bell
Party	Republican	Independent
Alliance	Prohibition; Progressive
Popular vote	387,547	251,189
Percentage	56.27%	36.47%
- County results Stephens: 40–50% 50–60 60–70% 70–80% 80–90% Bell: 40–50% 50–60% 60–70%
Governor before election
William Stephens
Republican
Elected Governor
William Stephens
Republican

The 1918 California gubernatorial election was held on November 5, 1918. Incumbent governor William Stephens was re-elected over independent Theodore Arlington Bell. The 1918 election is notable for its invocation of the Hawson amendment, a law designed to prevent a candidate from winning the nomination of another party via cross-filing; after Republican mayor of San Francisco James Rolph won the Democratic primary, the Democratic Party was left without a nominee.

In the Republican primary, Stephens defeated Rolph by approximately 23,000 votes. He also won the Prohibition and Progressive primaries. Rolph won the Democratic primary by 14,000 votes over famed prosecutors Francis J. Heney and Thomas L. Woolwine and received the most combined votes of any candidate across all primaries. However, under the Hawson amendment passed the year prior, Rolph was unable to accept the Democratic nomination because he had not won his own party's nomination. As a result, the Democratic Party was left without a nominee in the general election.

In the general election, Stephens defeated Theodore Arlington Bell, who had been the Democratic nominee in 1906 and 1910 and entered the race after the primary as their de facto candidate, by over 130,000 votes. Stephens was the first governor elected with an absolute majority of the vote since Henry Gage in 1898 and won the highest share of the vote since Frederick Low in 1863.

== Primary election ==
San Francisco mayor James Rolph, a Republican, cross-filed in both the Republican and Democratic primaries, won the Democratic primary, and received the most overall votes of any candidate in the primary election across all parties. However, because he failed to win his own party's nomination, he was barred from receiving the Democratic nomination thanks to the 1917 Hawson amendment to California electoral law, leaving the Democratic Party without a candidate. Incumbent Republican governor William Stephens won the Republican, Prohibition, and Progressive nominations. The only other primary candidate to advance to the general election was Socialist Henry H. Roser, running unopposed.

Republican primary results
Party	Candidate	Votes	%
Republican	William Stephens	169,942	44.99%
Republican	James Rolph	146,990	38.91%
Republican	J. O. Hayes	24,676	6.53%
Republican	Walter Bordwell	17,038	4.51%
Republican	Charles Fickert	13,259	3.51%
Republican	C. A. A. McGee	4,014	1.06%
Republican	Francis J. Heney	1,539	0.41%
Republican	Thomas Lee Woolwine	276	0.07%
Republican	Henry H. Roser	8	0.00%
Total votes		377,742	100.00%

Democratic primary results
Party	Candidate	Votes	%
Democratic	James Rolph	74,955	43.76%
Democratic	Francis J. Heney	60,662	35.41%
Democratic	Thomas Lee Woolwine	28,879	16.86%
Democratic	William Stephens	6,257	3.65%
Democratic	J. O. Hayes	309	0.18%
Democratic	Charles Fickert	91	0.05%
Democratic	Walter Bordwell	73	0.04%
Democratic	C. A. A. McGee	54	0.03%
Democratic	Henry H. Roser	10	0.01%
Total votes		171,290	100.00%

Prohibition primary results
Party	Candidate	Votes	%
Prohibition	William Stephens	12,853	96.97%
Prohibition	Francis J. Heney	157	1.18%
Prohibition	James Rolph	97	0.73%
Prohibition	Walter Bordwell	53	0.40%
Prohibition	Thomas Lee Woolwine	35	0.26%
Prohibition	J. O. Hayes	31	0.23%
Prohibition	Charles Fickert	21	0.16%
Prohibition	C. A. A. McGee	7	0.05%
Prohibition	Henry H. Roser	1	0.01%
Total votes		13,255	100.00%

Progressive primary results
Party	Candidate	Votes	%
Progressive	William Stephens	5,142	53.44%
Progressive	Francis J. Heney	3,418	35.52%
Progressive	James Rolph	980	1.18%
Progressive	J. O. Hayes	26	0.27%
Progressive	Walter Bordwell	18	0.19%
Progressive	Thomas Lee Woolwine	17	0.18%
Progressive	Charles Fickert	13	0.14%
Progressive	C. A. A. McGee	6	0.06%
Progressive	Henry H. Roser	2	0.02%
Total votes		9,622	100.00%

Socialist primary results
Party	Candidate	Votes	%
Socialist	Henry H. Roser	7,931	85.43%
Socialist	James Rolph	704	7.58%
Socialist	Francis J. Heney	382	4.11%
Socialist	William Stephens	214	2.31%
Socialist	J. O. Hayes	29	0.31%
Socialist	Thomas Lee Woolwine	19	0.20%
Socialist	Walter Bordwell	3	0.09%
Socialist	Charles Fickert	1	0.01%
Socialist	C. A. A. McGee	1	0.01%
Total votes		9,284	100.00%

After the Democrats were left without a nominee, Theodore Arlington Bell, who had been the Democratic nominee for governor in 1906 and 1910, entered the race as an independent. His second-place finish in the general election indicated that Democrats regarded him as their de facto candidate.

== General election results ==
1918 California gubernatorial election
Party	Candidate	Votes	%	±%
Republican	William Stephens (incumbent)	387,547	56.27%	+26.92%
Independent	Theodore Arlington Bell	251,189	36.47%	
Socialist	Henry H. Roser	29,003	4.21%	−1.26%
Republican	James Rolph (write-in)	20,605	2.99%	
	Scattering	326	0.05%	
Majority		136,358	19.80%	
Total votes		688,670	100.00%	
Republican hold		Swing	-0.54%	

=== Results by county ===
County	William D. Stephens Republican		Theodore A. Bell Independent		Henry H. Roser Socialist		James Rolph Write-in		Scattering Write-in		Margin		Total votes cast
County	#	%	#	%	#	%	#	%	#	%	#	%	Total votes cast
Alameda	42,276	56.72%	27,332	36.67%	4,288	5.75%	619	0.83%	18	0.02%	14,944	20.05%	74,533
Alpine	56	82.35%	9	13.24%	3	4.41%	0	0.00%	0	0.00%	47	69.12%	68
Amador	933	46.39%	887	44.11%	45	2.24%	146	7.26%	0	0.00%	46	2.29%	2,011
Butte	3,637	55.01%	1,496	22.63%	236	3.57%	1,235	18.68%	7	0.11%	2,141	32.39%	6,611
Calaveras	905	55.52%	650	39.88%	56	3.44%	0	0.00%	19	1.17%	255	15.64%	1,630
Colusa	1,200	54.05%	722	32.52%	51	2.30%	247	11.13%	0	0.00%	478	21.53%	2,220
Contra Costa	4,539	50.69%	3,778	42.19%	534	5.96%	103	1.15%	0	0.00%	761	8.50%	8,954
Del Norte	585	64.36%	268	29.48%	52	5.72%	0	0.00%	4	0.44%	317	34.87%	909
El Dorado	950	41.36%	681	29.65%	75	3.27%	591	25.73%	0	0.00%	269	11.71%	2,297
Fresno	15,607	66.99%	6,679	28.67%	944	4.05%	67	0.29%	0	0.00%	8,928	38.32%	23,297
Glenn	1,685	59.06%	757	26.53%	77	2.70%	331	11.60%	3	0.11%	928	32.53%	2,853
Humboldt	5,974	65.25%	2,317	25.31%	467	5.10%	389	4.25%	9	0.10%	3,657	39.94%	9,156
Imperial	2,748	68.61%	1,066	26.62%	188	4.69%	0	0.00%	3	0.07%	1,682	42.00%	4,005
Inyo	744	64.64%	315	27.37%	88	7.65%	0	0.00%	4	0.35%	429	37.27%	1,151
Kern	5,894	52.58%	4,897	43.68%	413	3.68%	0	0.00%	6	0.05%	997	8.89%	11,210
Kings	3,286	67.93%	1,375	28.43%	162	3.35%	13	0.27%	1	0.02%	1,911	39.51%	4,837
Lake	1,032	58.80%	619	35.27%	87	4.96%	0	0.00%	17	0.97%	413	23.53%	1,755
Lassen	1,068	56.18%	444	23.36%	82	4.31%	307	16.15%	0	0.00%	624	32.82%	1,901
Los Angeles	106,198	63.78%	54,031	32.45%	6,094	3.66%	63	0.04%	121	0.07%	52,167	31.33%	166,507
Madera	1,763	60.50%	994	34.11%	138	4.74%	17	0.58%	2	0.07%	769	26.39%	2,914
Marin	2,811	46.59%	2,961	49.08%	261	4.33%	0	0.00%	0	0.00%	-150	-2.49%	6,033
Mariposa	605	54.65%	439	39.66%	58	5.24%	5	0.45%	0	0.00%	166	15.00%	1,107
Mendocino	2,780	52.17%	2,281	42.80%	268	5.03%	0	0.00%	0	0.00%	499	9.36%	5,329
Merced	2,751	63.62%	1,337	30.92%	208	4.81%	28	0.65%	0	0.00%	1,414	32.70%	4,324
Modoc	930	60.74%	428	27.96%	54	3.53%	115	7.51%	4	0.26%	502	32.79%	1,531
Mono	114	56.44%	67	33.17%	20	9.90%	1	0.50%	0	0.00%	47	23.27%	202
Monterey	3,739	62.97%	1,954	32.91%	188	3.17%	57	0.96%	0	0.00%	1,785	30.06%	5,938
Napa	1,805	32.31%	3,511	62.84%	165	2.95%	106	1.90%	0	0.00%	-1,706	-30.54%	5,587
Nevada	1,899	52.23%	875	24.06%	135	3.71%	727	19.99%	0	0.00%	1,024	28.16%	3,636
Orange	9,192	73.17%	2,985	23.76%	384	3.06%	0	0.00%	2	0.02%	6,207	49.41%	12,563
Placer	1,978	44.23%	937	20.95%	121	2.71%	1,436	32.11%	0	0.00%	542 (Note: Margin over Rolph)	12.12%	4,472
Plumas	540	51.28%	251	23.84%	50	4.75%	212	20.13%	0	0.00%	289	27.45%	1,053
Riverside	7,181	74.71%	2,021	21.03%	410	4.27%	0	0.00%	0	0.00%	5,160	53.68%	9,612
Sacramento	9,004	43.64%	5,517	26.74%	438	2.12%	5,675	27.50%	0	0.00%	3,329	16.13%	20,634
San Benito	1,227	56.94%	858	39.81%	55	2.55%	14	0.65%	1	0.05%	369	17.12%	2,155
San Bernardino	9,899	69.56%	3,909	27.47%	422	2.97%	0	0.00%	0	0.00%	5,990	42.09%	14,230
San Diego	16,333	65.07%	7,618	30.35%	1,132	4.51%	12	0.05%	5	0.02%	8,715	34.72%	25,100
San Francisco	36,099	35.96%	56,726	56.51%	5,249	5.23%	2,302	2.29%	6	0.01%	-20,627	-20.55%	100,382
San Joaquin	9,475	57.10%	5,776	34.81%	713	4.30%	630	3.80%	0	0.00%	3,699	22.29%	16,594
San Luis Obispo	3,128	59.21%	1,806	34.19%	349	6.61%	0	0.00%	0	0.00%	1,322	25.02%	5,283
San Mateo	3,909	47.16%	3,817	46.05%	422	5.09%	138	1.66%	3	0.04%	92	1.11%	8,289
Santa Barbara	4,699	67.32%	1,915	27.44%	351	5.03%	0	0.00%	15	0.21%	2,784	39.89%	6,980
Santa Clara	13,167	59.53%	8,077	36.52%	699	3.16%	155	0.70%	19	0.09%	5,090	23.01%	22,117
Santa Cruz	4,014	61.83%	1,863	28.70%	216	3.33%	399	6.15%	0	0.00%	2,151	33.13%	6,492
Shasta	1,949	55.35%	937	26.61%	178	5.06%	450	12.78%	7	0.20%	1,012	28.74%	3,521
Sierra	379	54.38%	181	25.97%	22	3.16%	113	16.21%	2	0.29%	198	28.41%	697
Siskiyou	2,196	48.49%	1,360	30.03%	216	4.77%	757	16.71%	0	0.00%	836	18.46%	4,529
Solano	3,254	43.88%	3,497	47.15%	235	3.17%	430	5.80%	0	0.00%	-243	-3.28%	7,416
Sonoma	5,258	41.77%	6,696	53.20%	366	2.91%	258	2.05%	9	0.07%	-1,438	-11.42%	12,587
Stanislaus	6,459	66.92%	2,795	28.96%	346	3.58%	48	0.50%	4	0.04%	3,664	37.96%	9,652
Sutter	1,093	50.37%	495	22.81%	56	2.58%	526	24.24%	0	0.00%	567	26.13%	2,170
Tehama	1,963	61.73%	731	22.99%	124	3.90%	362	11.38%	0	0.00%	1,232	38.74%	3,180
Trinity	475	52.37%	245	27.01%	60	6.62%	127	14.00%	0	0.00%	230	25.36%	907
Tulare	8,927	71.46%	3,025	24.21%	511	4.09%	0	0.00%	30	0.24%	5,902	47.24%	12,493
Tuolumne	1,263	56.18%	827	36.79%	157	6.98%	1	0.04%	0	0.00%	436	19.40%	2,248
Ventura	3,243	66.59%	1,465	30.08%	157	3.22%	0	0.00%	5	0.10%	1,778	36.51%	4,870
Yolo	1,765	47.07%	1,238	33.01%	71	1.89%	676	18.03%	0	0.00%	527	14.05%	3,750
Yuba	964	44.06%	451	20.61%	56	2.56%	717	32.77%	0	0.00%	247	11.29%	2,188
Total	387,547	56.27%	251,189	36.47%	29,003	4.21%	20,605	2.99%	326	0.05%	136,358	19.80%	688,670

==== Counties that flipped from Progressive to Independent ====
- Marin
- Napa
- San Francisco
- Solano
- Sonoma
