= Asa Keyes =

American lawyer

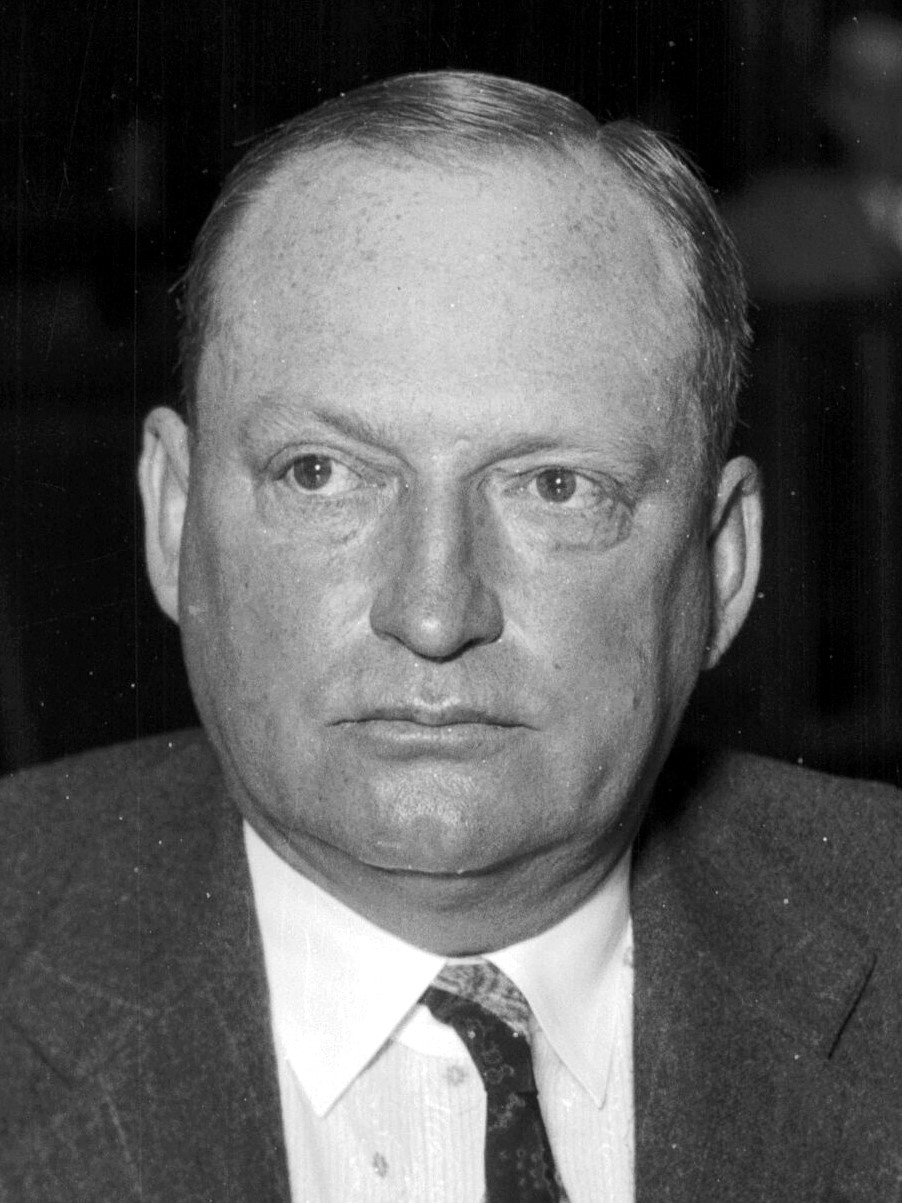
- Keyes in 1928

28th District Attorney of Los Angeles County
- In office June 6, 1923 – December 3, 1928
- Preceded by: Thomas L. Woolwine
- Succeeded by: Buron Fitts

Personal details
- Born: August 9, 1877 Wilmington, California
- Died: October 18, 1934 (aged 57) Los Angeles, California
- Resting place: Wilmington Cemetery
- Party: Republican
- Spouse: Lillian Samuels (m. 1903)
- Children: Annis; Elizabeth
- Education: University of Southern California

Asa Keyes (August 9, 1877 – October 18, 1934) was district attorney of Los Angeles County, California from June 1923 until 1928, when he was found guilty of accepting a bribe from the Julian Petroleum Corporation and was sentenced to five years' imprisonment. He was paroled in October 1931, then pardoned by Governor James Rolph in August 1933.

== Early years and career as a prosecutor ==
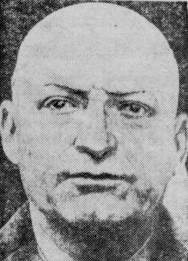
Former Los Angeles District Attorney Asa Keyes in 1931 following his release from prison

Keyes was born August 9, 1877, in Wilmington, California, and attended the University of Southern California, after which he entered the district attorney's office. When Thomas L. Woolwine resigned in June 1923, Keyes stepped into his position. A year later Keyes called upon 87 department employees to resign, and he reappointed only 27 of them to form his new team. During 1924 he caused the average length of a felony trial to be cut from 130 to 51 days.

In 1922, while still an assistant District Attorney, Keyes was part of the team that prosecuted members of the Ku Klux Klan for their participation in a raid on the home of a suspected bootlegger that resulted in the death of one of the raiders, All the defendants were acquitted.

Later, as District Attorney, Keyes convened a grand jury to investigate charges against two Long Beach, California police officers accused of brutally assaulting three African-American teenagers suspected of theft. There is no record of any subsequent prosecution.

On the other hand, Robert W. Kenny, then a journalist and later the Attorney General of California, claimed in his memoirs that Keyes employed an investigator whose job was to serve as liaison with the local leadership of the Klan.

In 1926, Keyes brought felony charges against celebrity evangelist Aimee Semple McPherson, her mother, and several others, alleging McPherson's reported kidnapping was a hoax. However, in January the following year, the charges were dropped due to a lack of evidence.

In 1928, Keyes delivered the prosecution's closing argument in the trial of William Hickman. The jury returned a guilty verdict in 36 minutes.

== Convicted of bribery ==
Keyes' office charged S.C. Lewis, Jacob Berman, and Ed Rosenberg on mail fraud charges involving the sale of Julian Petroleum stock that had, according to some estimates, wrongfully deprived investors of more than $150,000,000.00. After all three defendants were acquitted following a three-month trial conducted by Keyes the trial judge denounced the verdict as a miscarriage of justice and accused Keyes of engineering the result by his "lackadaisical methods of prosecution."

Keyes was subsequently charged with accepting about $100,000 in bribes from Julian Petroleum officials in return for the acquittal of Lewis and Berman. Buron Fitts, who was the lieutenant governor, resigned in 1928 and was elected Los Angeles County District Attorney and acted as prosecutor in Keyes' trial.

Keyes and two of the jurors who voted for acquittal were convicted of accepting bribes. A newspaper reporter who attempted to blackmail some of the Julian principals by threatening to expose suppressed evidence that had come into his possession was later convicted. Keyes was sentenced from one to fourteen years in prison.

After his appeals were exhausted, Keyes reported to prison in March 1930. He reportedly said, as he entered San Quentin, "What is life? We have an hour of consciousness and then we are gone."

== Final years ==
The California Board of Parole reduced Keyes' term to five years, the last two years to be spent on parole. With credits for good behavior, he was released on October 13, 1931. Keyes worked as a car salesman in Los Angeles, but without much success, then tried to earn a living as general manager of a bail bond company. He sought and obtained a pardon from Governor Rolph, but was denied readmission to the bar by the California Supreme Court. Keyes also worked as a bit player portraying lawyers in Hollywood films in his years after release from prison, but always uncredited and almost always with his back to the camera.

Keyes died on October 18, 1934, after suffering a stroke. He left his wife, Lillian, and two daughters, Elizabeth and Mrs. Fred McGuire.

== See also ==
- Ku Klux Klan raid (Inglewood, California), for one of Keyes' notable cases
- Disappearance of Aimee Semple McPherson, for another one of Keyes' notable cases
