= Disappearance of Aimee Semple McPherson =

1926 alleged kidnapping of evangelist

Aimee Semple McPherson
- Prior to her story of being kidnapped in 1926, McPherson was little known outside Southern California.

On May 18, 1926, American Christian evangelist Aimee Semple McPherson disappeared from Venice Beach, California, after going for a swim. She reappeared in Mexico five weeks later, stating she had escaped from kidnappers there. Allegations arose that the kidnapping story was a hoax carried out to conceal a tryst with a lover, leading to court inquiries. Her disappearance, reappearance, and the resulting allegations and inquiries precipitated a media frenzy that changed the course of McPherson's career.

== Disappearance ==
On May 18, 1926, McPherson went with her secretary to Ocean Park Beach north of Venice Beach to swim. Soon after arriving, McPherson was nowhere to be found. It was thought she had drowned.

A crowd watches the search of the water off Ocean Park beach after McPherson's disappearance.

McPherson was scheduled to hold a service that day; her mother Minnie Kennedy preached the sermon instead, saying at the end, "Sister is with Jesus", sending parishioners into a tearful frenzy. Mourners crowded Venice Beach and the commotion sparked days-long media coverage fueled in part by William Randolph Hearst's Los Angeles Examiner and a stirring poem by Upton Sinclair. Daily updates appeared in newspapers across the country and parishioners held day-and-night seaside vigils. Two people died searching for McPherson's body.

During the disappearance of Aimee Semple McPherson, from May 18 to June 23, 1926, there were many sighting claims. Canadian officials thought they had the evangelist, as attested to by three investigators; however, it turned out to be another woman.

Kenneth G. Ormiston, the engineer for radio station KFSG, had left his job at McPherson's Angelus Temple in December 1925.

Newspapers later linked McPherson and Ormiston, who was seen driving up the coast with an unidentified woman. Some believed McPherson and Ormiston, who was married, had run off together.

McPherson's children, Roberta Star Semple and Rolf McPherson, were scrutinized for appropriate signs of grief. Rolf, who had been boarding in a remote farmhouse for some years, was besieged because of a rumor he had spoken to McPherson by telephone.

Many sightings of McPherson were reported. A Culver City detective thought he had seen her drive from the beach in her Angelus Temple uniform but this turned out to be a parishioner wearing clothes typical of those worn by female Temple members. On one particular day she was "seen" in 16 different cities. A spiritualist said McPherson was bound in a cabin.

For a time Mildred Kennedy, McPherson's mother, offered a $25,000 (Note: equivalent to $454,652 in 2025) reward for information leading McPherson's return. During the period of her disappearance, while there were "various and voluminous claims", of McPherson sightings, none at all came from Carmel-by-the-Sea, a California town that would later dominate the headlines for such sightings. After the reward expired, on June 5, newspaper headlines announced McPherson had been found in Canada, as given by Inspector Middleton of the Royal Northwest Mounted Police, which shook up Los Angeles.

Tracked by three detectives, a woman reported to have been the missing evangelist was found in Edmonton, Alberta; she had arrived there in a Studebaker via Calgary, followed by another car. The woman checked into the Corona hotel and was "positively identified" by the three operators as the revivalist. It was only after the woman was picked up by authorities, interviewed by the sister of Rev. Watson B; and gave proof of her identity as someone else, that the sighting report was rescinded on June 7. The Los Angeles police reiterated McPherson was dead, though Kennedy held out hope and extended the $25,000 reward for another week only.

Several ransom demands were received but determined to be fraudulent. One was a handwritten note by the "Revengers" who wanted $500,000 (Note: equivalent to $9,093,045 in 2025). Another for $25,000 was conveyed by a blind lawyer, Russell A. McKinley, who claimed contact with the kidnappers. A lengthy and poorly typewritten ransom letter from the "Avengers" arrived around June 19 demanding $500,000 in return for not selling McPherson into "white slavery"; the "kidnappers" said McPherson annoyed them with her incessant preaching. Kennedy believed these demands to be hoaxes and McPherson dead.

== Reappearance ==
Ramon and Teresa Gonzales with their son.

On June 23, McPherson stumbled out of the desert in Agua Prieta, Sonora, a Mexican town across the border from Douglas, Arizona. The Mexican couple she approached there thought she had died when McPherson collapsed in front of them. She stirred and the couple brought her inside and covered her with blankets. She claimed she had been kidnapped, drugged, tortured, and held for ransom in a shack by two men and a woman, "Steve", "Rose", and another unnamed man. A fourth person by the name of "Felipe" stopped by for a visit. (Note: Epstein refers to the third man as "Jake," Sutton's account does not name the 3rd individual. When asked the ethnicity of the kidnappers, McPherson, though not entirely certain, believed them all to be from the United States.) Some other articles and biographers nicknamed the woman "Mexicali Rose". An hour after reviving her, the husband, R. R. Gonzales, alerted the municipal president of Agua Prieta, Ernesto Boubion, to see her. Boubion stated she grasped his wrist, trembled violently, and asked where she was. She looked ill and appeared agitated, and declined both food and drink. She was transported across the border to a police station in Douglas, Arizona, and then to the Douglas Hospital. Her shoes were white with desert dust and her hands were covered with grime. A nurse picked some cactus spines from her legs and rubbed some preparation on a blistered toe. McPherson went on about protection for her 16-year-old daughter and warned her assailants had plans to make off with Mary Pickford and other celebrities. At that time no one believed she was McPherson, the missing Angelus Temple pastor. A reporter heard the claims and visited the hospital. Though she was emaciated and barely recognizable, the journalist said he knew her from covering past revival meetings. Once properly identified, her family and some Los Angeles authorities took a train to see her.

According to McPherson, while she was on the beach near Los Angeles, a young couple approached and asked her to come pray for their sick child. When she went with them and looked in on the bundle in the back seat of an automobile, they shoved her into their car. At the same time a cloth was held over her face loaded with a sickly sweet substance, later speculated to be chloroform with an additive.

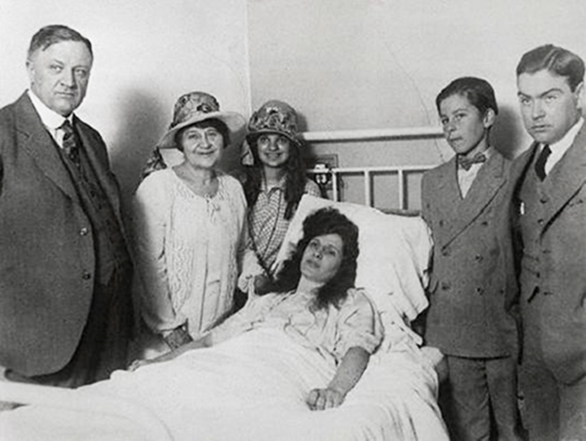
McPherson in the hospital in Douglas, Arizona. From left: District Attorney Asa Keyes, Mildred Kennedy (mother), Roberta Star Semple, Rolf McPherson, Deputy District Attorney Joseph Ryan.

After awakening, she was no longer clothed in her bathing suit and was wearing a dress. "Rose", who displayed professional nursing skills, looked after her. Held for a time in what was a boarded up room in a house that appeared to be an urban area, she was later moved to the remote shack in Mexico. Trying to elicit some personal information to prove they had her, one of her captors burned McPherson's hand with his cigar, but felt bad about it and stopped. McPherson's statement gave details on how she escaped the desert shack while her assailants were out on errands. She cut her bonds on a metal can lid, a technique she later successfully demonstrated several times before skeptical reporters, and climbed out the shack's back window. Using a mountain to navigate, she made her way north. She told how she used her garments to shield herself from the afternoon sun and navigated the desert, which including using the lights from a nearby town to find people. There, she encountered dogs, which prompted her to hide in the yard of a Mexican couple, R. R. Gonzales and his wife. Her story was transmitted and transcribed across telegraph and phone lines, becoming front-page international news.

On the way back to Los Angeles, the train was stopped and boarded by two men who claimed to have earlier seen McPherson during the time she stated she was kidnapped. One man, realizing a mistaken identity, apologized and excused himself after seeing her. However, in a much publicized scene, the other individual stated he had seen her at a Tucson, Arizona, street corner four weeks earlier, in May. By his own admission, he had never seen McPherson in person, only by photograph. The woman he saw in the street wore a tight, low fitting hat shading her eyes and walked with a different gait than McPherson used. He claimed it was the obscured eyes that confirmed his identification. However, this witness was later discarded as his sighting came at a time when McPherson was accused by Los Angeles prosecutors to have instead been in Carmel-by-the Sea, California.

Following her return to Los Angeles from Douglas, McPherson was greeted at the train station by 30,000–50,000 people. The parade back to the Temple even elicited a greater turnout than President Woodrow Wilson's visit to Los Angeles in 1919.

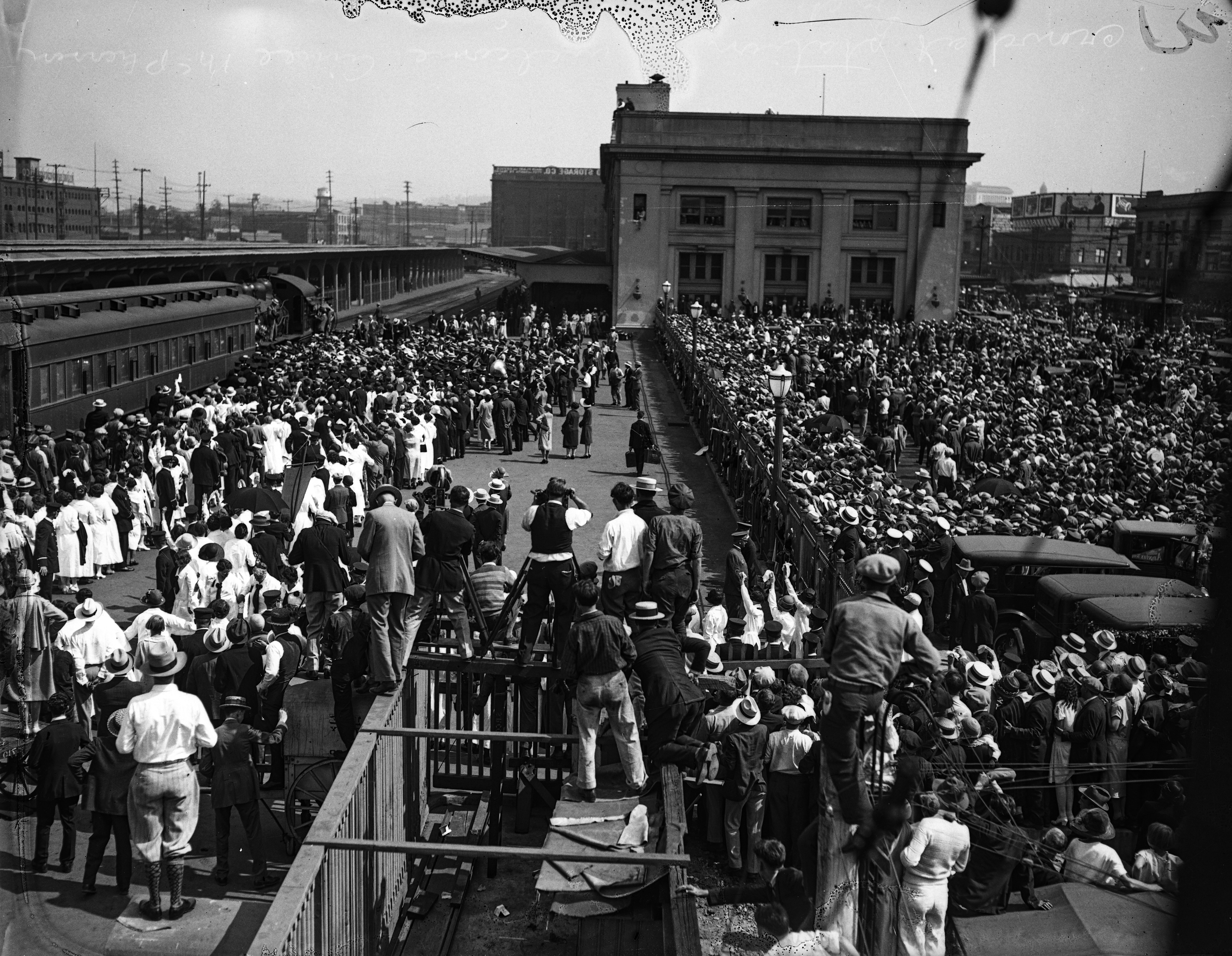
Tens of thousands met McPherson's train on her return from Arizona.

Already incensed over McPherson's influential public stance on evolution and the Bible, most of the Chamber of Commerce and some other civic leaders, however, saw the event as gaudy display, nationally embarrassing to the city. Many Los Angeles area churches were also annoyed. The Chamber of Commerce, together with Reverend Robert P. Shuler leading the Los Angeles Church Federation, and assisted by the press and others, became an informal alliance to determine if her disappearance was caused by other than a kidnapping.

In response to an increasing undercurrent of doubt, the leadership of the Angelus Temple debated whether to let the matter drop or push for vindication. McPherson welcomed the opportunity for more publicity, since she saw it as a way to expose more people to her vision of Jesus Christ. Kennedy thought the controversy might get away from them and become disruptive to the Temple's activities. Judge Carlos Hardy, an influential friend of the Temple and McPherson, decided to go to court to present their complaint, over the stern objections of Kennedy and lawyers hired for advice.

== Grand jury inquiries ==
There were several phases of grand jury inquiries regarding McPherson, all conducted by Los Angeles District Attorney Asa Keyes. The first inquiry was about charging McPherson's kidnappers, with indictments against Steve Doe, Rose Doe, and John Doe, convening on July 8, 1926, and adjourning on July 20, 1926. The first inquiry ended with a determination that there was not enough evidence to charge either alleged kidnappers or the McPherson group for fraud.

The second inquiry, amidst frenzied publicity, started on August 3 in response to new developments suggesting that rather than being held by kidnappers, McPherson was cohabiting with her former employee Kenneth Ormiston in the resort town of Carmel-by-the-Sea. The inquiry stalled due to lack of evidence and ended by mid-August. Later, when a defense witness, Lorraine Wiseman-Sielaff, sided with the prosecution as a betrayed co-plotter, another grand jury inquiry was ordered to begin in late September. Testimony and evidence from Carmel-by-the Sea was reintroduced by the prosecution, together with their new witness. Their intent was to show proof of a conspiracy by the McPherson party to manufacture evidence in bolstering her kidnapping story. McPherson's defense team, previously overshadowed by publicity favoring the prosecution, was able to comprehensively explain their side of the case.

A jury trial was scheduled for January 1927 to charge McPherson, Kennedy and several other defendants with criminal conspiracy, perjury and obstruction of justice. If convicted, the counts added up to a maximum prison time of 42 years.The charges were a criminal conspiracy to commit acts injurious to public morals, to prevent and obstruct justice, and to prevent the due administration of the laws, and of engaging in a criminal conspiracy to commit the crime of subordination of perjury. Further statements and information were taken from various witnesses ahead of the projected trial through early January 1927.

=== Escape through the desert ===
McPherson said Mayor Ernesto Boubion of Agua Prieta, Sonora, wanted $5,000 to support her kidnapping story.

The first inquiry started on July 8, 1926, with reading McPherson's statement into the record. Testimony continued with what allegedly happened in Mexico, though the most comprehensive portions, especially from the defense, came later in October.

Mexican officials asserted that McPherson could not have been taken across the border against her will because it was patrolled with a "strict watch" by both nations, that a special police had been assigned to all border towns immediately after McPherson's disappearance, and that McPherson could not have been anywhere in Lower California. One of the persons named in McPherson's statement, "Felipe", was described as "a huge hulking man". In another case the federal government was attempting to locate an "Old Felipe" of Mexico City, described as being in charge of a narcotics and human trafficking ring, corroborating part of McPherson's testimony and the typewritten ransom note received earlier which threatened to sell McPherson to "Old Felipe of Mexico City".

Initial, vigorous searches around Agua Prieta did not locate any kidnappers or even the shack where she was allegedly imprisoned. The mayor of Agua Prieta, Ernesto Boubion, after examining some foot tracks, expressed his belief she got out of a car three miles (4.8 km) from Agua Prieta. Boubion also considered it a "national insult" that a prominent American woman could be kidnapped into his territory.

However, it was later revealed by Boubion's translator that Boubion had solicited McPherson for a bribe. When McPherson returned to Mexico in early July 1926 to assist in looking for signs of her kidnappers, Boubion asked to see her. With his translator the only other person in the room, Boubion told McPherson that individuals had offered to pay him $5,000 to cast doubt on her story, though he would back her statement if she paid him the same amount instead. McPherson's attorneys brought a lawsuit against Boubion for extortion.

Crowds at the hospital near Douglas in which McPherson recuperated

In criticism of McPherson's story, prosecutor Asa Keyes spoke of temperatures as high as 120 °F (49 °C) the day she disappeared, (Note: Asa Keyes in his summation stated "walked 17 miles across the desert with the thermometer at 120 degrees Fahrenheit". His own witnesses gave as low as 100 degrees. Temperature was measured in Douglas at 96 degrees, C.E. Cross stated 97 degrees on June 22, and it was 99 degrees when he later searched the Sonora desert.) and the impossibility of walking 20 miles (32 km) over that territory without water. It was reported that McPherson was in unusually good health for her alleged ordeal; her clothing showed no signs of what was expected of a long walk through the desert. Keyes, while speaking to McPherson during a grand jury session, said "Don't you know it is practically an impossibility for anyone, particularly a woman, to walk over the desert in Mexico in the broiling sun from noon until practically midnight without water?" The sheriff of Cochise County, James A. McDonald, and a police sergeant in Douglas, Alonzo B. Murchison, both expressed opinions about not crossing the expanse without severely damaging garments or footwear. Murchison also said "There is no woman that could make a trip like that and not be near complete exhaustion."

In his affidavit in support of McPherson, R.R. Gonzales stated that around 1:50 am on June 23 he found an unknown woman "lying on the ground unconscious or fainted, in the gate, with her feet inside and her head out in the street. I thought she was dead at the time, she was cold." Gonzales and his wife picked her up and put her in bed. Police officer G.W. Cook stated that "in affiant's opinion she was then in a state of complete physical exhaustion".

C. E. Cross

In the first grand jury inquiry, Keyes drew attention to a watch visible on McPherson's wrist in a photograph of her in the hospital bed; he asserted that she had not taken a wristwatch to the beach and the kidnappers were unlikely to let her have one. However, the couple who found her, the mayor of Agua Prieta, policemen, nurses and other persons she met with did not recall her having a wristwatch before she was in hospital. McPherson said she obtained the watch in the hospital.

The skepticism was disputed by most other Douglas area residents, including expert tracker C.E. Cross, who testified that McPherson's physical condition, shoes, and clothing were all consistent with an ordeal such as she described. Cross also noted tracks consistent with McPherson's shoes near an automobile's tire prints outside Agua Prieta, and determined they had nothing to do with each other. The temperature was only 97 °F (36 °C) in the Sonora Desert on the day of McPherson's desert trek. Based on this, Mayor A.E. Hinton, together with 22 representative citizens of Douglas, Arizona, signed a testimonial document affirming their belief in the statements McPherson made.

Several months later, Douglas Constable O. A. Ash elaborated on the prison shack that could not be located in earlier searches. He said the shack, a miner's cabin near an abandoned mine 18 miles (29 km) from Douglas, was found on August 18, 1926. Inside they saw the oil can which had been opened with a can opener, "and we could see that the rough edge had been used to cut the bed ticking strips which apparently had bound the woman's wrists and ankles." He also said he saw the marks on McPherson's wrists made by these strips, that her ankles were swollen, and that there were holes in her stockings and a pocket was torn from her dress.

=== Carmel-by-the-Sea ===
The cottage at Carmel-by-the-Sea taken by "George E. McIntyre" (said to be Ormiston) and "Mrs. McIntyre" the day after McPherson's disappearance.

The grand jury met a second time in late July after new evidence was received appearing to place McPherson at a northern California seaside resort town during the first part of her disappearance. The prosecution collected at least five witnesses who asserted they had seen McPherson two months earlier at the Benedict seaside cottage in Carmel-by-the-Sea. The cottage was rented by Ormiston under an assumed name of "George E. McIntyre". While sightings of McPherson were reported as far away as Canada, no reports at the time came from Carmel.

Los Angeles authorities realized, however, that none of their witnesses had verifiably seen McPherson in person, only in photographs. The prosecution invited McPherson to visit Carmel, conveying that if she had nothing to hide, she should present herself to the witnesses for a proper identification. McPherson's lawyers, however, prevented her from going to Carmel-by-the Sea, as they were concerned the alleged witnesses would identify her from the photos they were given and not from the person they actually saw.

The list of persons who testified before the grand jury that they saw McPherson at Carmel included Jennette Parkes, who lived next door to the cottage. She caught passing glimpses of the woman, wearing a cap and goggles at no closer than about 25 feet (7.6 m); with one sighting estimated as long as two minutes. Later, through the kitchen window, she said, she noticed that the woman had a mass of red hair piled high on her head. When McPherson removed her hat to expose her hair, the witness confirmed her identity. Parkes' husband Percy gave testimony he also saw the woman for an estimated total of perhaps 30 seconds. One time he saw her "rush into the cottage", without cap and goggles.

Another was Ernest Renkert, who delivered a load of wood to the cottage. He admitted, though, that he earlier told a judge she was not over 25 and still another judge that the woman he saw at the Carmel-by-the-Sea cottage was a blonde. McPherson was over 35 and had auburn hair. He had first read of the $25,000 reward offered for McPherson's return a week after he first saw the woman. Due to the pictures of her that were in circulation, McPherson questioned why they didn't report the sighting and collect the reward.

H. C. Benedict, owner of the Carmel cottage.

Another witness, stonemason William McMichaels, testified he saw "Miss X" more times than all other witnesses put together, as he had labored on the fence of the Carmel cottage throughout May 18–29 during its occupation by Ormiston and his feminine companion. He said he was within ten feet (3 m) of the woman at the bungalow on several occasions. He said McPherson "is not the woman I saw". Other persons also stated the woman seen at the Carmel-by-the-Sea cottage was not McPherson.

The landlord of the cottage, H. C. Benedict, wrote on the back of a photo of McPherson that there was nothing about it that reminded him of the woman who was with Ormiston. Benedict testified that Joseph Ryan, Deputy District Attorney, tried very hard to get him to identify the woman in his rented cottage as McPherson; however, he could not. When asked about the photos of McPherson, he answered, "he had a whole squad of them up there...and they been pulling these photographs and saying "do you recognize this" and another one "Do you recognize this?"

Some prosecution witnesses stated that when they saw McPherson in Carmel, she had short hair, and that she was wearing fake hair swatches piled up to give the impression of longer hair. To refute this, McPherson unpinned her hair, disproving these witnesses. The prosecution witnesses in general did not get an unobstructed view of the woman staying in the cottage while most of those who saw her without the hat, scarf and goggles, with some speaking at length with her; could not identify "Miss X" as McPherson. August England, Carmel's town marshal, and tax collector of 10 years, for example, indicated he saw "Miss X" at a range of 8 to 10 feet (2.4 to 3.0 m), at least three times between the May 19 and 29 and spoke with her. She was not wearing a hat and was without goggles. Asked if McPherson was the woman he saw there, he said: "Positively not the woman." With his testimony, McPherson wrote of the prosecution, "Gone was the one great chance to bolster up the indefinite vagueness of the examination that had gone on before." A columnist for the San Bernardino Sun wrote on the selection of prosecution witnesses "without a doubt they are honest in their opinions, but that the sworn servants of the law should try to hang a woman's reputation on such hazy testimony passes understanding." The columnist further added:

The most important witness, who says he is an engineer by profession, was compelled to admit on the stand that the woman he saw at Carmel he first took to be one that he knew, and later he revised his opinion when he read the newspaper stories of the disappearance of Mrs. McPherson, and after seeing her once on the street there, he came to Los Angeles 75 days later, and declare he identifies her.

A lawyer later noted the Carmel-by-the-Sea witnesses were being called to identify a woman they saw two months earlier when nothing of an unusual nature took place at the time which would help fix her image in their memory. Testimony concerning "Miss X", the unknown woman seen with Ormiston, varied widely. She was 40 or more, or a girl of not over 25; she had dark eyes, dark hair, and olive complexion or fair skin or blond.

Ormiston admitted to having rented the cottage but claimed that the woman who had been there with him– known in the press as "Mrs. X"– was not McPherson but another woman with whom he was having an extramarital affair.

Six religious books found in the Carmel-by-the-Sea cottage turned out to belong to the landlord's wife.

The grand jury reconvened on August 3 and took further testimony along with documents from hotels, all said by various newspapers to be in McPherson's handwriting using assumed names. However, the collected paperwork could not link Ormiston to McPherson. Upon further investigation, amidst all the persons and their aliases listed in the case, the only individual showing no reluctance in signing her own name to any hotel register, reporters found, was McPherson.

The Carmel cottage was further checked for fingerprints, but none belonging to McPherson were recovered. Two grocery slips found in the yard of the cottage were studied by a police handwriting expert and determined to be McPherson's penmanship. While the original slips later mysteriously disappeared from the courtroom, photostat copies were available. The defense had a handwriting expert of their own and claimed to have a photograph of the well publicized slips which differed from the police photostat. They contended the reproduction "had been maliciously tampered with" to resemble McPherson's handwriting. The slips' suspicious origin was also questioned. The original slips would have been in the yard for two months, surviving dew, fog, and lawn maintenance before their discovery.

Prosecutor Keyes reasoned that without fingerprints conclusively placing McPherson at the scene, the case at Carmel-by-the-Sea "had blown up". Since not enough evidence from Carmel-by-the-Sea was obtained to proceed to trial, by mid-August the investigation appeared to be at an end. After a defense witness decided to instead testify for the prosecution, another grand jury investigation was formed starting in late September 1926.

=== Final grand jury inquiry phase and dismissal ===
With one of the critical defense witnesses, Lorraine Wiseman-Sielaff, turning state's evidence, the prosecution submitted their file to the judge. On November 3, Judge Samuel R. Blake was to try McPherson, her mother and several other defendants in a jury trial case in Los Angeles, set for mid-January 1927. If convicted, the counts added up to maximum prison time of 42 years.

4505 Gramercy Place, where suspected evidence was found.

Since the bulk of the testimonies had taken place, the defense rested its case on October 29. However, new developments continued afterwards. The prosecution wanted to question H. C. Benedict about the contents of a blue steamer trunk purportedly belonging to Ormiston confiscated in September, but the landlord of the cottage died in mid-November. Apart from affidavits and messages, Ormiston still had not given testimony. More importantly, Wiseman-Sielaff appeared to be giving new information concerning the conspiracy implicating McPherson and her circle of friends and acquaintances.

By late December, the prosecution determined their new star witness, Wiseman-Sielaff, could no longer be a considered a credible witness. Without her, District Attorney Asa Keyes considered other evidence insufficient to continue prosecuting the case. Keyes submitted a document to have the case dismissed, conveying that without Wiseman-Sielaff's testimony, the alleged conspiracy was impossible to prove. He added "Reputable witnesses have testified sufficiently concerning both the Carmel incident and the return of Mrs. McPherson from her so-called kidnapping adventure to enable her to be judged in the only court which has jurisdiction —the court of public opinion." The Examiner newspaper reported that Keyes had dropped all charges against McPherson and associated parties on January 10, 1927.

Rev. Robert P. Shuler of Trinity Methodist Church.

Regardless of the court's decision, months of unfavorable press reports fixed in much of the public's mind a certainty of McPherson's wrongdoing. Many readers were unaware of prosecution evidence having become discredited because it was often placed in the back columns while some new accusation against McPherson held prominence on the headlines. In a letter he wrote to the Los Angeles Times a few months after the case was dropped, the Reverend Robert P. Shuler stated, "Perhaps the most serious thing about this whole situation is the seeming loyalty of thousands to this leader in the face of her evident and positively proven guilt."

Some supporters thought McPherson should have insisted on the jury trial to clear her name. The grand jury inquiry concluded that while enough evidence did not exist to try her, it did not indicate her story was true with its implication of kidnappers still at large. (Note: No persons fitting the description of the kidnappers were identified, though, on June 29, 1926, an El Paso Herald reporter asked Emil Lewis Holmdahl, an American infantryman turned soldier of fortune, if he had been involved in the alleged kidnapping of famous California evangelist McPherson. Holmdahl, who fought extensively in earlier Latin American turmoil wars and was cleared by a Mexican judge as a suspect in the February 6, 1926 theft of Pancho Villa's head, enigmatically replied regarding McPherson, "Well, maybe I did and maybe I didn't." In contrast, unless intoxicated, he always emphatically denied participating in a grave robbery that stole Villa's head.) Therefore, anyone could still accuse her of a hoax without fear of slander charges and frequently did so. Moreover, court costs to McPherson were estimated as high as US$100,000.

== Two prominent defendants ==
Several defendants were charged as a result of the 1926 grand jury inquiries, among them McPherson, Kennedy, Ormiston, and Lorraine Wiseman-Sielaff. Dr. A. M. Waters, who was implicated by Wiseman-Sielaff as being involved in McPherson's alleged Carmel coverup, committed suicide when he learned of the grand jury's interest in him.

=== Kenneth Ormiston ===
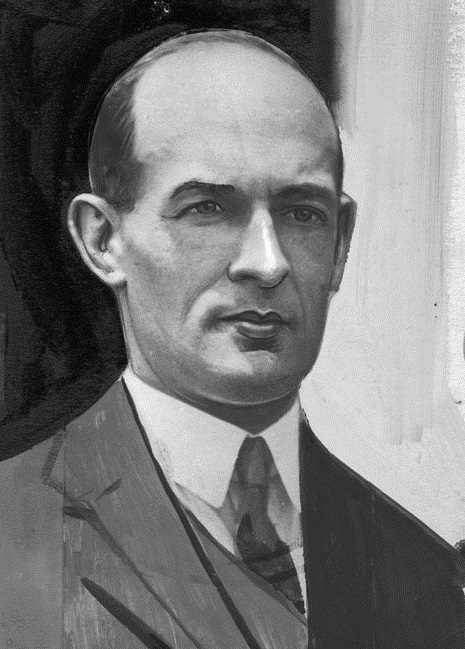
Kenneth G. Ormiston, former Angelus Temple radio operator

As McPherson's accused lover who allegedly assisted in the kidnapping fraud, Ormiston was a prominent defendant in the 1926 grand jury inquiry. He had been McPherson's radio operator and was crucial in getting her programs on the air. He also had a distinctive limp that frequently identified him more than any other feature. During the time of McPherson's disappearance, newspapers freely speculated about him and the Los Angeles DA office initiated various manhunts accompanied by front-page headlines, searching for the elusive radioman. Though attempts were made to romantically connect McPherson with Ormiston, no conclusive evidence that they were lovers could be uncovered. Some law enforcement officials outside of Los Angeles alleged the pursuit of Ormiston was done for publicity.

McPherson appeared to be friendly with Ormiston and it was insisted their relationship was strictly professional. Marital problems with his jealous wife led to marriage counseling conducted by McPherson. Around late December 1925, he left his job at the Angelus Temple, then disappeared, prompting his wife to report him missing in January, 1926. Some rumors placed him in Europe with McPherson, however, during that time, he called the Angelus Temple from Washington State in March where he was employed as a car salesman. McPherson's daughter, Roberta, joined her there in Europe to prevent further gossip.

McPherson's May 18 disappearance coincided with Ormiston taking possession of a cottage he rented for three months in the seaside resort town of Carmel-by-the Sea. Rumors developed that his companion was the missing McPherson, and police sought Ormiston. He immediately turned himself in to authorities on May 27, denying that he went into hiding, and stated that his name being connected to McPherson's was "a gross insult to a noble and sincere woman". Though he did not mention Carmel to head off unwanted attention there, he gave details of his previous movements. Since his name was now inserted into the McPherson case, Ormiston was worried about being followed around.

His concerns materialized two days later. On the evening of May 29, near Santa Barbara, a reporter tracked Ormiston's blue Chrysler sedan coupe, and flagged it down. After examining the driver and his female passenger, the reporter determined while the man was Ormiston, he could not identify the woman, "Miss X", as McPherson. As the result of the incident, a Santa Barbara Morning Press article headline later read: Road Watched for Ormiston and Evangelist.

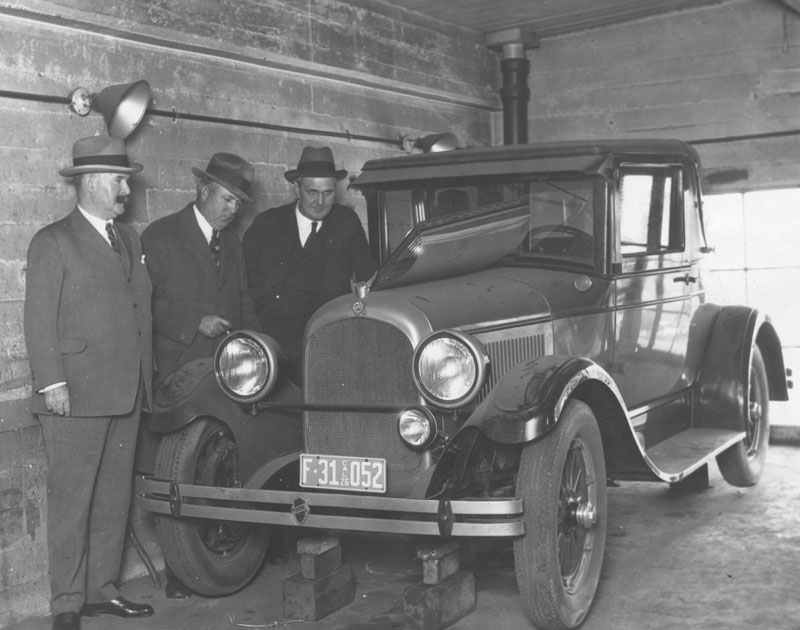
Ormiston's blue Chrysler sedan.

To escape further media attention, Ormiston vacated his Carmel-by-the-Sea cottage and placed his blue sedan in a storage garage. After arguing with "Miss X", he left her in a hotel, abandoned California and traveled to Colorado, Illinois, New York, Philadelphia and other locations. The hotel operator and a garage employee were later able to identify Ormiston as the man who patronized their respective establishments. Both persons were certain the woman with him was not McPherson. The garage employee remarked the woman did, though, have a striking resemblance to McPherson.

In late July, reporters and police received information a person who fit Ormiston's description had rented a Carmel-by-the-Sea cottage in May. In response to the intense news coverage of a half a dozen or more witnesses suddenly alleging they saw McPherson there, Keyes launched another manhunt for Ormiston. McPherson herself pleaded through the papers for Ormiston to clear the matter up. Annoyed, Ormiston sent a letter from New York to Keyes denouncing the treatment received from newspapers and officials as "nasty publicity and subsequent persecution by self-styled investigators", and that he had no intention of appearing before the Los Angeles grand jury. He released a lengthy statement to the police and several newspapers. Affirming "Miss X" was not McPherson, he added his companion had "the same general build and brown hair color as the evangelist".

Kenneth Ormiston made front page headlines as a nationwide police manhunt targeted him starting in July 1926.

Along with insufficient evidence acquired at Carmel, Ormiston's affidavit was believed to have influenced the discontinuance of the second grand jury investigation of the McPherson case around August 11. However, developments occurred with a new prosecution witness, Lorraine Wiseman-Sielaff; and renewed efforts were made by Los Angeles authorities to bring Ormiston back to Los Angeles.

On October 29, after the defense rested its case, District Attorney Asa Keyes announced the September discovery of a large blue steamer trunk allegedly owned by Ormiston and thought to be full of McPherson's clothing. On November 8, 1926, a Kansas City private detective, described as a "go between" for Ormiston, transmitting him money and messages, stated the trunk was a fake. Ormiston, who was still eluding authorities to avoid being pressured to reveal Miss X's true name, said on November 19 "the trunk is bunk". Some of the clothing was found to be the wrong size for McPherson.

A blue trunk purportedly owned by Ormiston that was found in a hotel in New York.

In December, Ormiston was found by newsmen, living quietly in Harrisburg, Pennsylvania. Papers described him being taken without resistance by police while sitting at a typewriter. Among Ormiston's personal effects were five diplomas from five radio schools and letters implying he had a wife in Brazil. He was escorted to Chicago, Illinois, with intent to be transported to Los Angeles. Keyes said he would "do everything in his power" to extradite Ormiston. However, he did not stop in Chicago to pick him up though he traveled near there on his way to and from Washington, D.C. The Chicago police chief denounced Keyes for "yelling to high heaven for his apprehension" but when the fugitive Ormiston was "within reach", Keyes called Ormiston of minimal importance. The Chicago police chief lacked proper documents for further action, and to the annoyance of Los Angeles officials, Ormiston was released. When the warrant was finally obtained, Chicago police were ready to transport their expected prisoner, Ormiston, to Los Angeles. However, Ormiston appeared in Los Angeles surrounded by newsmen and was greeted by the entire prosecution staff. Ormiston accepted his served warrant. His bond was set at $2,500.

Ormiston declined to answer any questions from the numerous reporters, stepped into Keyes's office and typed out his statement. He maintained he was not at Carmel-by-the-Sea with Mrs. McPherson, stated he violated no conspiracy laws and was not afraid to face trial. In early January 1927, Ormiston testified and gave the name of Elizabeth Tovey, a nurse from Seattle, Washington, as the person who was "Miss X" and his female companion and the woman who stayed with him at the seaside cottage on May 19–29 in Carmel-by-the Sea. A few days later, on January 10, 1927, all charges were dropped against Ormiston, McPherson and all remaining defendants.

=== Lorraine Wiseman-Sielaff ===
Lorraine Wiseman-Seilaff

Keyes was about to drop the inquiry in mid August when fingerprints belonging to McPherson could not be found at the Carmel-by-the Sea cottage. He determined other evidence at Carmel was too vague for a successful perjury prosecution against the defendants. An unexpected opportunity, though, invigorated the case when a defense witness appeared to flip. Keyes thought he now had a direct eyewitness account of the conspiracy conducted by McPherson, Kennedy, and Ormiston to manufacture false evidence. The chief witness against McPherson was now Lorraine Wiseman-Sielaff. Based on her testimony, Keyes ordered a new grand jury investigation.

Wiseman-Sielaff introduced herself to McPherson and declared she was in Carmel as a nurse for her twin sister who was Ormiston's mistress; because the twins somewhat physically resembled McPherson, they were being misidentified as McPherson. McPherson embraced Wiseman-Sielaff as an important witness who would exonerate her, and for a time she was a guest at the Angelus Temple parsonage. Ormiston also signed a letter around September 8 that his companion was a sister of Wiseman-Seilaff, confirming her initial story. Later, Wiseman-Sielaff was caught for passing bad checks and blamed it on her twin sister. When her story became untenable, she requested that the Angelus Temple post her bail, but they refused. Wiseman-Sielaff then said McPherson paid her to tell that story about what happened at Carmel-by-the-Sea and assist in hiring someone to pose as "Miss X". She was charged as a defendant in the case in November because she admitted her alleged role as an alibi for McPherson at Carmel and sided with the prosecution for immunity.

Harry Melosh and his wife, "Babe" Daniels, who was another "Miss X" in the McPherson case

As the grand jury inquiry progressed, Wiseman-Sielaff implicated one of McPherson's lawyers, Roland Rich Woolley, for inappropriate conduct when they lived in another state where she said they went to school together. The accusations forced Woolley from the case. Eventually it was proven Wiseman-Sielaff lied about the relationship, and Woolley gave evidence he had not met Wiseman-Sielaff until August 15, 1926. According to Woolley, who was visiting a judge in his office at Salinas on August 15, Wiseman-Sielaff and Virla Kimball, her twin sister, voluntarily appeared there and signed an affidavit attesting that she and her sister were at Carmel-by-the-Sea with Ormiston. A cab driver confirmed the presence of the two women there. It was purported by the defense that Kimball might have been Ormiston's "Miss X". On May 19, the date Ormiston and the mystery woman appeared at the cottage, it was confirmed that Kimball was at nearby Alameda County filing for divorce. She also admitted to being in Salinas on August 15, but was not in the judge's office, stating she did not sign any such affidavit and threatened to sue McPherson if she were drawn into "this horrible case". Wiseman-Sielaff inserted yet another sister as "Miss X" into the inquiry, Rachel Wells of Philadelphia, as the person who actually signed the affidavit.

In the meantime, another woman came forward: Babe Daniels, 20, of Chicago, IL. Daniels stated that she was "Miss X" at Carmel. Later, she claimed to have been in on a McPherson plot, working with Wiseman-Sielaff with the promise of never having to worry about money again. Prosecutor Keyes rejected Daniels's story "as a tissue of lies" and cut her loose with a stern rebuke that anyone else attempting such a fraud would be "exposed by his office". Criticism erupted and a news columnist wrote:

Why not prosecute all perjurers, instead of devoting all his attention to one whom every attendant circumstance suggests isn't a perjurer at all, but simply telling the truth and making the prosecution ridiculous?

Wiseman-Sielaff declared that she made a note in her memorandum book regarding money sent, on behalf of McPherson, to Rachel Wells on August 4. However, when asked to produce the memorandum book for examination, Wiseman-Sielaff said she had destroyed the book. Her testimony became more inconsistent as she was further queried in December. It was revealed that Wiseman-Sielaff once spent time in a Utah mental institution.

Keyes, whose case relied totally on this witness to prove the alleged conspiracy, realized Wiseman-Sielaff was giving false testimony against Mrs. McPherson. Keyes briefly considered charging Lorraine Wiseman-Sielaff with perjury as her testimony kept the inquiry going for another six weeks, costing $100,000 and yielded nothing. However, for all defendants, he submitted to the judge for case dismissal.

== Issues with the prosecution ==
The grand jury investigation against McPherson adversely affected the careers of several Los Angeles officials including Keyes, Assistant Deputy District Attorney Joseph Ryan, and Chief of Detectives Captain Cline.

Vice in general was readily flourishing under Keyes and he legalized slot machines, an act that was later rescinded by his successor. Keyes was also known as a "secret drinker" during Prohibition in Los Angeles, patronizing a back room in the tailor shop of Ben Getzoff who had a steady supply of liquor.

=== Assistant Deputy District Attorney Joseph Ryan ===
Deputy District Attorney Joseph Ryan with the shoes McPherson said she wore while crossing the desert

In the Douglas hospital, as he helped to question McPherson, Assistant Deputy District Attorney Joseph Ryan enthusiastically professed his faith in McPherson's story. He even said he could make the desert trip without scuffing or marking his commissary shoes. Later, however, in Los Angeles, Ryan testified that he knew that McPherson was a "fake and a hypocrite" the first time he saw her in the hospital. Ryan was assistant to Keyes, and did much of the legwork in building the case against McPherson. The defense contended that both Ryan and his father-in-law, Captain Herman Cline, neglected their duty by disregarding evidence unearthed by border authorities that substantiated McPherson's version of her re-appearance. The declaration by W. A. Gabrielson, chief of police of Monterey, said that "Mr. Ryan's conduct of this case was most unethical", referring to the methods Ryan used, among them entering the cottage in Carmel-by-the-Sea without a warrant, and without any local official present. Of particular interest among the seized pieces of evidence was a medicine bottle, because it was dated May 25, 1926, within the timeframe Ormiston and "Miss X" occupied the cottage. The persecution then sought out information about the druggist and prescribing doctor about the medicine's user. As it turned out, the bottle belonged to the landlord, H. C. Benedict, and contained a "commonplace preparation". Keyes thought that all the evidence obtained at Carmel-by-the-Sea was too vague for a successful prosecution for perjury and was ready to quit the case. Ryan met with Keyes and presented his "ace in the hole evidence" for continuance at Carmel-by-the-Sea. What Ryan offered was in the form of a receipt for a telegram said by him to be in McPherson's handwriting, signed by her at the Carmel cottage with two related witness identifications.

Without fingerprints, Keyes was unconvinced that there was sufficient evidence, and in early August ordered witness subpoenas to be suspended along with any further investigation at Carmel-by-the Sea. However, Ryan went over the head of his superior, and publicly announced the mystery solved and the case over, that the kidnapping was a ruse. It was then expected that more would be done with the inquiry. For that breach of procedure, Ryan also had the ire of Judge Keetch directed at him since such an accusation represented "a bald and sordid accusation against a woman who has insisted that a crime had been committed against her". Tension between Ryan and Keyes increased, and Ryan was released from the case. The two witnesses, the telegram messenger and a Salinas garage-man later denied that "Miss X" was McPherson.

=== Chief of Detectives Captain Herman Cline ===
Chief of Detectives Herman Cline

Chief of Detectives Captain Cline was in on the investigation from the time of McPherson's disappearance. Cline, like Ryan, initially professed faith in McPherson's account of abduction and escape.

The description of the shoes when taken from McPherson reads that the "uppers showed slight wear and the soles were scuffed; leather in the insteps was bright and bore markings like grass stains." Cline, however, was quoted as stating to Ryan, "You saw those shoes, the grass stains on the instep, what is so rare as a blade of grass on the desert in June?" It was alleged that there was no grass in the desert and that McPherson's shoes and other garments from her desert trek were in pristine condition. However, McPherson had been photographed ankle deep in scrub grasses while looking for her tracks and the area was host to cattle drives. McPherson's statement, published in the papers, included approximate weight, height, age, eye and hair color, and complexion and mannerisms of each of her captors. In later remarks attributed to Cline, he expressed skepticism, for example claiming to have had only limited success in getting any details from her regarding the kidnappers' appearance.

In late July, Captain Cline, together with deputy DA Joseph Ryan, canvassed Carmel-by-the-Sea for witnesses alleging that they had seen McPherson there. On August 22, Cline was jailed for drunk driving after running into another car with his police vehicle. Following this, the Angelus Temple complained and forced the Los Angeles police department to remove Cline from the case.

=== District Attorney Asa Keyes ===
The hearing of McPherson. District Attorney Asa Keyes is at right.

District Attorney Asa Keyes led the prosecution. He was once a featured speaker at the Angelus Temple. Biographer Daniel Mark Epstein explained that Keyes was a public servant, responding to the pressures of many in the Los Angeles constituency who thought that McPherson was making their city a laughingstock.

Keyes conducted the grand jury inquiry in a manner that afforded McPherson the most detrimental public exposure possible, including releasing details of a prosecution witness's testimony to the press, while honoring the code of grand jury secrecy only when it came to the defense side. He was known for winning convictions, but six persons he sent to prison were found to be innocent and pardoned by California's state governor, Friend Richardson. Keyes was chastised for this. Richardson understood pardons for the same district attorney could occur once or even twice under an administration but six times was inconceivable.

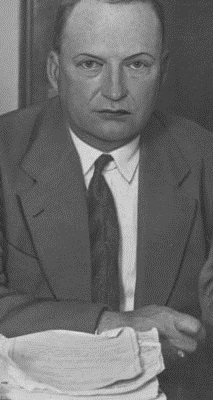
District Attorney Asa Keyes

After months of testimony and investigation Keyes lacked the evidence he sought to successfully prosecute the McPherson party in a jury trial. Therefore, in January 1927, he asked for case dismissal.

Alternate theories circulated about the real reason for the dismissal. One story, purportedly from a secret FBI file, claimed that newspaper tycoon William Randolph Hearst was being blackmailed by McPherson, who threatened to publicize a story she heard about him murdering movie producer Thomas H. Ince in 1924, and for being in an adulterous affair with actress Marion Davies. Hearst, fearing that such stories could damage his reputation, then pressured Keyes to drop the case. However, these incidents were already part of the public record. Thomas Ince reportedly died of heart failure brought on by acute indigestion and already there was a run of news gossip concerning Hearst and speculated suspicious circumstances surrounding Ince's death. Davies was a companion to Hearst since 1917, previously enduring publicized scandals about it. Moreover, such scheming was contrary to McPherson's previously known behavior as attested to by others. Guido Orlando wrote of McPherson: "She was not a bigot, she did not pry into people's private lives,... She was in all the time I knew her incapable of malice toward anyone." Other rumors spread that she simply bribed Keyes to flush the case with "hush" monies amounting from $30,000 to as much as $800,000. Details and the sources of the various rumors were ambiguous, with little evidence forthcoming to establish credibility.

In late 1928, the Los Angeles County Grand Jury began looking into the possibility that Keyes had been bribed to drop charges against McPherson. An investigation was started and Keyes was acquitted. In another case where Keyes appeared as a witness, he again was asked about the dismissal. Keyes reiterated that it was because of Wiseman-Seilaff, stating that no prosecutor has the right "to defile the courts" with known perjured testimony so absolutely unreliable as Wiseman-Seilaff gave. Any further effort to prosecute "could not be done with honor or with any reasonable hope of success". Judge Albert Lee Stephens granted the request for case dismissal.

== Other controversies with the inquiries ==
=== Misleading news coverage ===
Prior to the trial, newspapers ran stories about her kidnapping that become increasingly sensationalized.

A newspaper editorial crossed the boundaries of publication decency for U.S. Postal Inspectors when 75-year-old Abraham. R. Sauer, of the San Diego Herald, wrote a column about McPherson and her purported "ten days in a love shack". He was charged with sending obscene literature through the mails. Though acquitted, four newspaper vendors selling the banned publication paid fines. Another publisher who reprinted and mailed the July 29 edition of the Herald was sentenced to two years in Leavenworth Federal Prison.

Grocery delivery boy Ralph Swanson.

A grocery delivery boy, Ralph Swanson, stated that McPherson answered the door when he delivered groceries to a home there. In a newspaper interview he stated seeing three physicians leaving the Carmel cottage at night; the news article created the impression an abortion had been carried out. The office records of a San Francisco physician suspected of providing abortions were targeted by reporters. However, the defense refuted this allegation; McPherson's near death medical operation in 1914, which prevented her from having more children, was already part of the public record. When challenged about the abortion claim with a request to pay for the medical exam to prove it, the newspaper which printed the story backed down.

Prosecution witness and retired engineer Ralph Hershey was described in some papers as a star witness for the state. However, different testimony in court was given than what was reported he would give. As published in various papers, Hershey said he was driving along a narrow lane in Carmel-by-the-Sea when two persons, whom he recognized as Mrs McPherson and Ormiston, came along the path. He was forced to stop his machine until they walked around.

When he got to court in September, however, his story did not include Ormiston or stopping his car. Hershey explained while driving, he saw a woman approximately 100 feet (30 m) away near a street corner wearing a tight, low hat. He later visited a friend and they agreed that the woman was a local resident who sold that friend his house. Hershey spelled the name of the local woman for the lawyer cross-examining him. Two and a half months later, after a newsman interviewed him, Hersey decided instead that the woman was McPherson. To confirm his identification, on August 8, he traveled to the Angelus Temple and at a distance of around 100 feet, he saw Mrs. McPherson. Hersey explained it was the large, open, brilliant eyes which clenched the identification for him. The lawyer asserted, without a demonstration, that he did not think that it was possible at that distance for Hershey "to have seen the shape of her eyes, little less their color, peculiar or otherwise".

Keyes, in his closing statement, made it clear that the investigation was assisted and largely underwritten by the area newspapers. Though many thought the newspaper investigations showed that McPherson was in Ormiston's company at Carmel-by-the Sea during the period of her disappearance, Keyes stated that evidence collected there was too vague and inconclusive to pursue further action against anyone on a perjury charge.

Police officials examining the clothes McPherson wore when she reappeared at Agua Prieta.

Shortly after the dismissal of the case, on January 18, 1927, Constable O. A. Ash of Douglas, Arizona was interviewed by a special staff correspondent of the San Bernardino Daily Sun. Constable Ash maintained that the press withheld important facts from the public and even gave deliberate misinformation regarding McPherson's kidnapping story. The papers denied, he said, there being bind marks from the kidnapper's restraints on McPherson's wrists, though he saw the marks himself. The country where he back trailed McPherson's 20-mile (32 km) trip he described as grassy and ideal pasture land with plenty of springs of water. He said that the maximum temperature was around 96 °F (36 °C). The scorching sands, described in many papers, and brush that would tear clothes and scratch shoes, the constable said, were not present in the region McPherson traversed. He described the papers reporting alleged testimony by witnesses even before they took the stand. Ash stated he knew little concerning the pastor and her work and said she was a "victim of much misrepresentation".

Judge Arthur Keetch of the Los Angeles Superior Court, who presided over one of the investigating grand jury bodies he later dissolved, stated on a later date that he thought that the papers "were running pretty wild at that time". He was annoyed that secret proceedings of his grand jury was being divulged to the public through the press. California grand jury members are bound by law not to discuss the case to protect the integrity of the process in determining whether there is sufficient cause for a formal juried trial. Robert P. Shuler was told as much by a newspaper in response to an open demand he made for more disclosure in the ongoing inquiry.

=== Evidence lost ===
Ransom letter sent to Minnie Kennedy.

The 1926 grand jury inquiry was also known for catalogued evidence that was inexplicably lost. Among the pieces that came up missing:

- A page-long handwritten ransom note demanding $500,000, signed "Revengers" and mailed on May 24 from San Francisco to the Angelus Temple. It was passed on to the police and later discovered to be missing from their locked evidence files in October. The district attorney's office claimed the missing note was written in "disguised handwriting" to help support the plot of McPherson being kidnapped. Because he was in San Francisco on May 24 and 25; and the handwriting and language were those of an "educated person", Ormiston was the purported author and this claim was passed on to the press. Photostats previously taken of the note were available to the state; though, nothing in court was presented actually tying Ormiston to the document.
- On July 4, a typewriter placed in storage in a federal building could not be located when it was later sought to test its keys against a sampling of one of the ransom notes demanding $500,000 received by the Angelus Temple. Federal post office inspectors launched a search in an attempt to locate the missing machine. Two different typewriters were used to produce the note in question. The missing typewriter was one of four being examined as possible devices used in the production of the note.
- The grocery slips, found at the Carmel-by-the-Sea cottage and asserted by the prosecution to be in McPherson's handwriting, mysteriously disappeared from the courtroom in early August. They were last seen being examined by a juror who left the courtroom on a break. Some speculated the juror was sympathetic to McPherson and dropped them down a toilet while in the restroom. The juror was investigated and determined to have no connection with the McPherson party and the loss of the grocery slips determined an accident. Kennedy alleged assistant DA Ryan might have disposed of them himself. The defense made a serious accusation against the prosecution stating the police photostats of the grocery slips, as supported by several area photographers, did not match the photograph taken of them. Their contention was, the photostats, which were in police custody, were altered to look like McPherson's handwriting.
- A big, blue steamer trunk purportedly belonging to Ormiston was confiscated in September from a New York hotel. Its contents were inventoried and the trunk sealed. Upon arrival in Los Angeles, Keyes checked its contents against the inventory list, however, several articles of clothing were missing.

Publicized stories of evidence being lost in the case was so frequent that Shuler was prompted to comment: "...that someone is lying and that Aimee won't be the only one mixed up in the dirty mess."

=== Theories and rebuttals ===
The Los Angeles prosecution office alleged that McPherson left the beach with Ormiston and stayed with him at Carmel-by-the-Sea for 10 days. Because they were almost identified by a reporter who stopped their car, the two fled California at the end of May, holed up somewhere for most of June, then made their way through Arizona to Mexico where she was dropped off outside of Agua Prieta.

Telegraph operator William Blevins supplanted this theory when he declared he identified McPherson from photographs. He compared handwriting from his logs to samples printed in the newspapers from the grocery slips found at the Carmel-by-the-Sea cottage yard. He said that she came into his office at Gila Bend, Arizona, on June 15 and sent a message to Tucson, Arizona, saying that an automobile had broken down and that she was taking a train. The prosecution confirmed his findings, subpoenaed two more local witnesses who claimed they saw the same woman, and announced it in the news.

Two fragments of the grocery slips found at the Carmel cottage.

The defense had a surprise witness. The wife of an airman stationed in the Philippines, Mrs. Gail X. Koontz, said it was she, and not McPherson, who sent a telegram from Gila Bend to Tucson on June 15. After withdrawing their much-publicized witnesses, the prosecution continued to offer theories. However, they had nothing to present in court to establish McPherson's whereabouts anytime during the three weeks prior to her reappearance at Douglas, Arizona.

A commentary published in an Ohio newspaper explored the situation. Contrary to this theory, Ormiston was absent from Los Angeles five months prior to McPherson's disappearance. However, Ormiston was being divorced by his wife, so the pair could have gotten married. It was seen as implausible that she would her career as a preacher to travel about the coast in disguise.

Other theories include that she had run off with another lover, was taking time to heal from plastic surgery, or had staged a publicity stunt. Headlines referred to McPherson with many derogatory names.

McPherson was heavily pressured to change her story; however, she never did and by demonstration, witness testimony and evidence, affirmed her story's plausibility. Even in later years, when McPherson had a falling-out with her mother, Kennedy, the latter two always insisted her 1926 disappearance was the result of a kidnapping.

== Alleged kidnappers ==
The McPherson party, apart from McPherson's testimony, claimed actual contact with the kidnappers through attorney-at-law Russell A. McKinley, who was trusted by the kidnappers because he was blind. On two occasions May and June, two men calling themselves Miller and Wilson—aliases for "Steve" and the unnamed assailant of the McPherson complaint—allegedly approached him and made an offer to return McPherson for $25,000. They told him that a rubber mask was briefly used on McPherson when taking her and the drug was laced with one quarter grain (16mg) of morphine, ensuring she was "doped" safely and quickly. They were given four questions, passed to McKinley from Kennedy, that only her daughter could answer, to prove that the men actually had her. Mildred Kennedy also gave McKinley $1,000 to assist him in his work. A ransom note was relayed and given to the police who, in disguise, visited a hotel lobby drop site as a precaution in case it was genuine. No results were forthcoming and the note was dismissed as fraudulent. Another ransom note demanding $500,000 was sent to the Angelus Temple with two of the questions correctly answered. McPherson later recalled an incident from her captivity when two of the kidnappers returned annoyed from an errand at a hotel, stating that they had recognized the detectives positioned there and left. She also said that they asked her personal questions and once she realized what they were doing, she refused to answer further. She thought that the $500,000 being asked for her return was way too much, because the Temple did not have it. One of them then burned her with his cigar in an attempt to get the other two questions answered. They threatened to take a finger if their ransom note did not work. Some days later, McPherson escaped.

Attorney R. A. McKinley and his secretary, Bernice Morris.

After McPherson's return to Los Angeles, McKinley promised to obtain information which would prove to the court that kidnappers had indeed held her during the disappearance. A car accident in August, though, claimed his life. Kennedy alleged that McKinley had been killed to silence his testimony. His death was considered a serious blow to McPherson's case. His secretary, Bernice Morris, however, testified for the prosecution, stating that she did not believe that there were any alleged kidnappers. The prosecution purported that the McPherson party sent at least two persons posing as the kidnappers to fool McKinley and secure his testimony, lending credibility to the kidnapping story.

Morris also stated that she had a photographic recreation of the kidnappers based on McPherson's description. McPherson was shown the image and allegedly reacted to it was as a genuine identification. Since it was a recreation, Morris took it as proof that McPherson was lying about her kidnapping. McPherson denied Morris' contention, claiming that the subjects in the photo were in heavy shadow. Morris continued with other damaging testimony; however, the defense was only allowed by the judge to minimally cross examine her. To check her credibility, McPherson lawyers asked for the release of McKinley's transcribed statement, which was earlier given to the DA's office before his death. The lawyers wanted to determine whether any of it confirmed his secretary's story or whether his testimony matched what McKinley was telling the Temple about his work. Of particular interest to the defense was what the transcripts in question said about a trip McKinley and Morris made to San Francisco in mid-August to meet with one of the alleged kidnappers. The prosecution refused, stating that those documents were irrelevant and the judge, Samuel R. Blake, said it was outside his power to compel their release.

Another person, an employee of the Southern Pacific Engineering Department, on September 26 made a statement alleging that Morris was living under a false name, Bernice Morris Allcorn Simpson. Furthermore, the employee alleged that Morris was involved in a homosexual relationship with an 18 year old girl being passed off as her younger sister. It was alleged that an anonymous call itself alleged that Morris was being blackmailed into lying to the court.

Sergeant Alonzo Murchison testifying

According to Judge Carlos Hardy, the police were doing little in looking for kidnappers, instead treating her story as false. Kennedy, therefore, hired the Burns Detective Agency to look for evidence supporting their side of the story.

Since the manager of the agency, J. W. Buchanan, did not want to report to a woman, Judge Hardy handled the details of the investigation. Rumors about several sets of "Steves" and "Roses" associated in criminal activities quickly turned up. One initially promising lead came from a convict who overheard fellow prisoners talk about the kidnapping as an actual event and involving a specific Steve, Rose and Frank who indicated that a lot of money could be made kidnapping and ransoming McPherson. However, that particular Rose was discovered to have been dead and Steve in prison prior to McPherson's disappearance. "Frank" was still at large.

On October 8, police sergeant Alonzo B. Murchison of Douglas, was questioned by the defense counsel about a report he submitted tending to substantiate the existence of "Steve" and "Rose", two of the alleged kidnappers McPherson described. The couple had registered frequently under the name of Mr. and Mrs. J. Stone at the Gladstone Hotel, in Douglas. "Steve" placed a car in a Douglas garage on June 16. The woman was identified as Rose McBridge, a nurse. A Los Angeles special investigator later believed Steve to be H. M. Hughes; and found a couple of their description staying at a ranch in Wellton, Arizona.

== Aftermath ==
The 1926 grand jury case, the largest of its kind in California, had hundreds of reporters and agencies looking for discrediting evidence against McPherson. Almost $500,000 (Note: equivalent to $9,093,045 in 2025) was spent, and 3,600 pages of transcripts generated. The Record stated "the McPherson sensation has sold millions of newspapers, generated fat fees for lawyers, stirred up religious antagonism ... advertised Los Angeles in a ridiculous way." Mencken said McPherson was not responsible for the controversy and called it a "dirty shame". Officials and others continued to investigate, even years later, but were unable to prove her kidnapping story false. In 1929, after a failed request by the state senate to reopen the older 1926 case, Journalist Morrow Mayo noted it was the last chance in California to "ruin that red-headed sorceress", and "she is free to serve the Lord until the Marines are called out."

The tale was later satirized in a song performed by Pete Seeger called "The Ballad of Aimee McPherson", with lyrics claiming the kidnapping had been unlikely because a hotel love nest revealed "the dents in the mattress fitted Aimee's caboose".

The Court of Historical Review and Appeal in San Francisco attempted a retrial in 1990. In April, a decision was handed down which found issues with the case. George T. Choppelas, the then presiding judge of the San Francisco Municipal Court, concluded that "there was never any substantial evidence to show that her story was untrue".

== See also ==
- List of kidnappings
- Lists of solved missing person cases
