= Thomas L. Woolwine =

American politician and lawyer

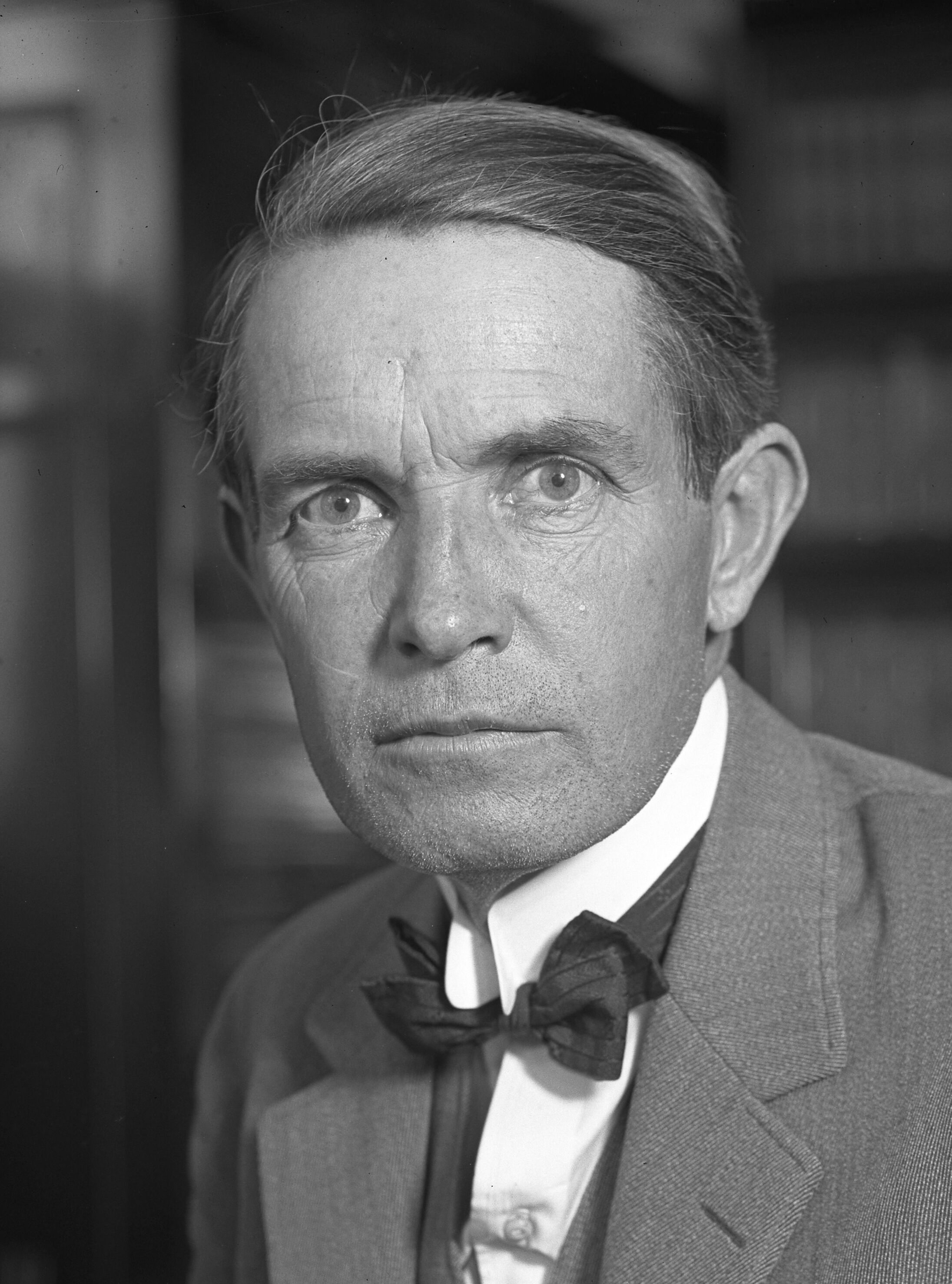
- Woolwine in 1920

27th Los Angeles County District Attorney
- In office January 4, 1915 – June 6, 1923
- Preceded by: John D. Fredericks
- Succeeded by: Asa Keyes

Personal details
- Born: October 31, 1874; Nashville, Tennessee, U.S.
- Died: July 8, 1925 (aged 50); Los Angeles, California, U.S.
- Political party: Democratic
- Spouse: Alma Foy Woolwine (m. 1900)

Thomas Lee Woolwine (October 31, 1874 – July 8, 1925) was an American lawyer and politician who served as the 27th District Attorney of Los Angeles County between 1915 and 1923. He began his career as a Deputy District Attorney in 1908. Woolwine was the Democratic nominee for Governor of California in the 1922 general election, but lost to Friend Richardson. In 1923, he resigned as District Attorney and was succeeded by Asa Keyes.

== Early life ==
Woolwine was born on October 31, 1874, in Nashville, Tennessee, his father being a Confederate soldier. He settled in Los Angeles in 1896 and studied law while clerking for United States District Attorney Frank Putnam Flint, later being admitted to the California bar in 1899. He studied at the Cumberland School of Law and graduated with a Bachelor of Laws in 1903, then graduated from Columbian College a year later.

== Career ==
=== Early career ===
In 1907, Woolwine was appointed as Deputy City Attorney of Los Angeles under Leslie R. Hewitt, and in the next year was named the City Prosecuting Attorney as well as the Deputy District Attorney of Los Angeles County. He criticized the District Attorney John D. Fredericks for being incompetent.

In 1909, with the recall proceedings against Mayor Harper by the Municipal League, Woolwine was suggested to run in the election, but both Woolwine and the Municipal League supported George Alexander. Woolwine argued that the party lines should not be used in city government, with Woolwine being a Democrat and Alexander being a Republican. In 1910, he ran against Fredericks for District Attorney of Los Angeles County and was endorsed by the Good Government Organization, Democrats, union leaders, and some Republicans including United States Senator Frank Putnam Flint. Although he was projected to win against Fredericks at a time where Republicans had a "clean sweep" in Los Angeles County, Fredericks won the election with 2,000 more votes.

=== District Attorney ===
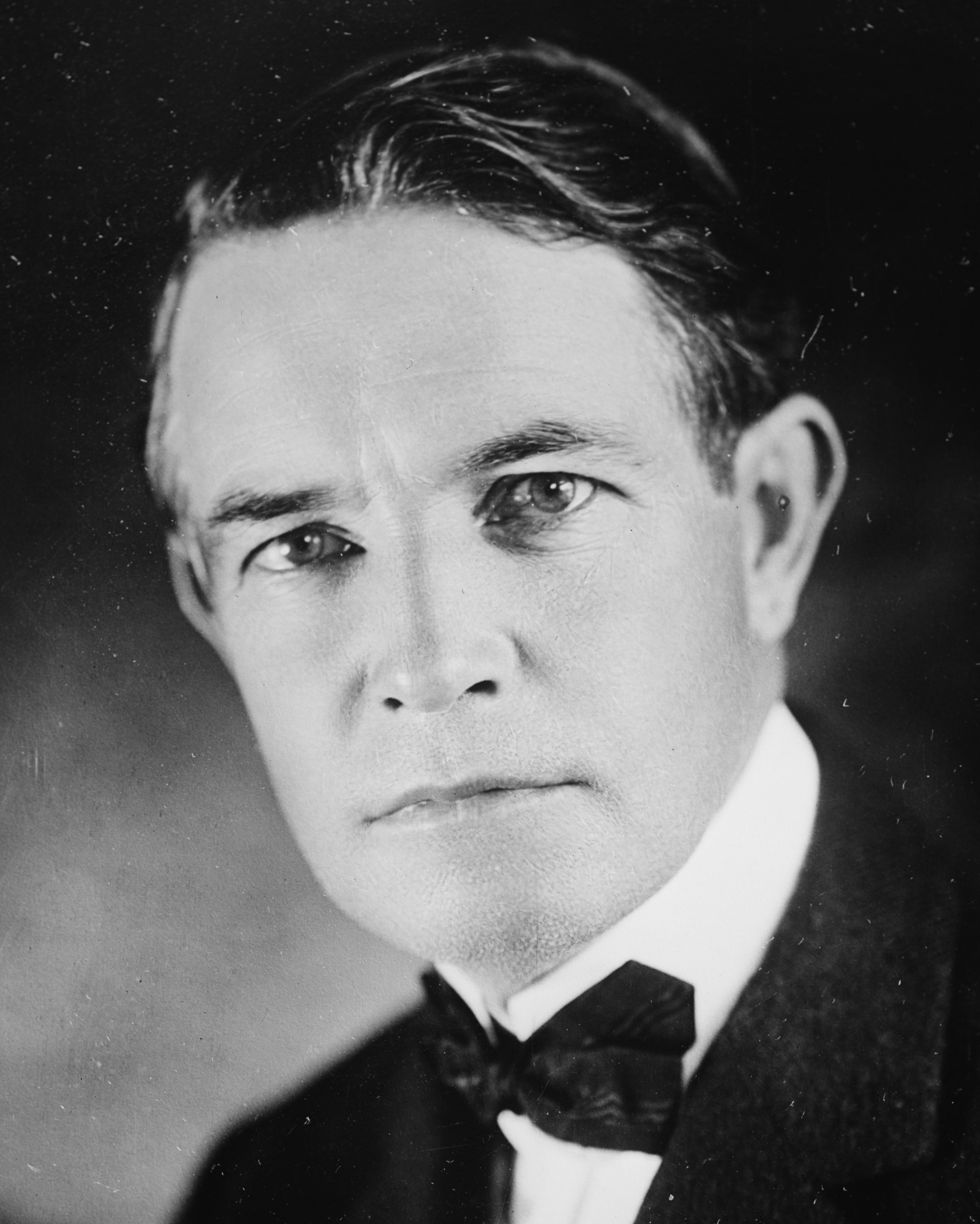
Woolwine in 1915 during his first term as District Attorney.

In 1914, he again ran for District Attorney against W. Joseph Ford, to which he won in the general election by a large majority. He served a two-year term due to a change in election years for the office, and during his tenure helped create three new departments of the Los Angeles Board of Supervisors, convicted a number of arsonists, and prosecuted against police chief Charles E. Sebastian. He also helped convict Milton Schmidt and David Caplan for their involvement with the 1910 bombing of the Los Angeles Times building, which he was praised by the Times who later endorsed him in the 1916 election after previously criticizing him in the 1910 election. That same year, he faced a trial brought by a former deputy, to which he was defended by his previous opponent, W. Joseph Ford, and was exonerated after a few days.

In 1916, he launched his re-election campaign and was opposed by four candidates, including former deputy W. T. Helms, and won against Helms in the general election. In his second term, he went after wholesale bakers who conspired to raise bread prices during World War I, with his efforts lauded by the United States Department of Justice. He later made the Food and Drug Administration and Senate investigate a price dispute between sugar refineries and sugar beet growers. In 1917, he charged three city councilmen and two county supervisors for funding mismanagement.

=== Runs for governor ===
In 1918, he ran for governor on the Democratic ticket but lost the primary to Francis J. Heney and Republican James Rolph, who cross-filed but was unable to participate in the election due to not winning his own party's nomination. After his loss, he ran again for District Attorney, with attacks coming from John D. Fredericks, accusing him of being soft on crime. The attacks backfired, and Woolwine was re-elected over opponent Charles W. Lyon, a State Senator.

In 1922, he announced that he was running in the 1922 California gubernatorial election and won the Democrat primary, being supported by Charlie Chaplin, Tom Mix, and Thomas H. Ince as well as some Republican organizations. He was opposed by the Ku Klux Klan since Woolwine had denounced the Klan and called for an investigation against them. He lost in the general election against Republican Friend Richardson.

Some voters in Los Angeles County wanted to recall him because he wanted the legal sale of lighter wines and beer, saying that he would be lax in enforcing the law. In 1923, he resigned due to health problems by the recommendation of his doctor, and his deputy Asa Keyes being appointed.

== Personal life ==
In 1900, he married Alma Foy, and they had a son together. After his resignation, he and Alma sailed to Europe with their son, but his medical problems became worse. In August 1924, they returned to Los Angeles and had to be carried on the ship on a stretcher, with a doctor and nurse accompanying him. He died on July 8, 1925, in Los Angeles.

Party political offices
Vacant Title last held by J. B. Curtin	Democratic nominee for Governor of California; 1922	Succeeded by Justus Wardell
