= Ezra Drown =

American politician

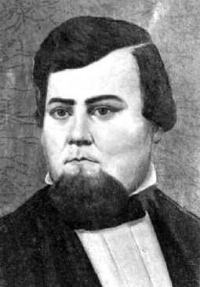

Los Angeles County District Attorney
- In office 1857–1859
- Preceded by: Cameron E. Thom
- Succeeded by: Edward J. C. Kewen
- In office 1861–1863
- Preceded by: Edward J. C. Kewen
- Succeeded by: Alfred Chapman

Personal details
- Died: August 17, 1863 San Juan Capistrano, California, U.S.

Ezra Drown was an attorney who escaped a shipwreck to become the district attorney of Los Angeles County, California, in 1857–59 and 1861–63 and a member of the Los Angeles Common Council, the governing body of the city of Los Angeles, in 1859 and 1861.

== Personal life ==
Drown was an attorney in Fairfield, Iowa, when he and his wife, Adeline, were called to California during the 1849 California Gold Rush by Adeline's father, Thomas Dickey, who had set up a pack horse business in that territory. "Much of the mining country was impractical to wagons, and everything had to be packed in on the backs of mules."

Drown did not make it to the mining country, but instead he settled in Los Angeles, where he became "an able lawyer, eloquent and humorous, and fairly popular; but his generosity affected his material prosperity, and he died, at San Juan Capistrano, on August 17th, 1863, none too blessed with this world's goods."

== Shipwreck ==
Drown and his family were in passage for San Francisco from San Juan del Sud, Nicaragua, in 1853 aboard the Independence, which struck a reef or rocks south of Margarita Island off the coast of the Baja California Peninsula, caught fire and sank.

Drown, being a good swimmer and a plucky fellow, set his wife adrift on a hencoop and then put off for shore with his two children on his back. Having deposited them safely on the beach, he swam back to get his wife; but a brutal fellow-passenger pushing the fainting woman off when her agonized husband was within a few feet of her; she sank beneath the waves . . . .

After the survivors arrived in California, Drown wrote a 1,623-word description of the tragedy, which was printed in the Alta California newspaper on April 2, 1853.

Oh God! What a situation to be in! Planks, spars, trunks and coops, covered with human beings struggling energetically for life, some wafted to the shore, others out to sea, some sinking, others being miraculously preserved. Here I saw females and children providentially rescued — then lost! Here was a kind husband who had sworn before God to protect her whom his soul loved, struggling for her safety; there was a father bearing his affectionate son to safety to the shore, looking around but to see the wife of his love dashed from the position in which he had left her, by mad and unthinking men jumping upon her and driving her to the bottomless deep.

A group of the passengers and crew later authorized Drown to "subscribe our names to an article for the public press to be prepared by him, in which he may charge the loss of the steamship Independence on the 16th of February 1853 to the carelessness, mismanagement of willfulness of Capt. Sampson," who supposedly "dismissed the rocks as whales."

== Los Angeles ==
When Drown finally arrived in Los Angeles about May 1853, the lawyers already present in that town "got on a bust," in his honor, "and ordered champagne and cigars first, then supper . . . . About midnight the crowd had become hilariously noisy . . .," and a brawl followed.

On October 12, 1857, a mass meeting at the Pavilion on the Los Angeles Plaza was held in concern over the Mountain Meadows Massacre by Mormons and American Indians in Utah Territory. Drown was appointed to a committee to draft a resolution which, the next day was adopted and called for "prompt measures" to be taken "for the punishment of the authors of the recent appalling and wholesale butchery of innocent men, women and children."

== Public service ==
=== Iowa ===
Drown was a major in the Third, Regiment, Second Brigade of the Iowa state militia in 1848, and in on April 16, 1851, he became quartermaster general of the militia.

He was a charter member of IOOF Lodge No. 6 in Lockridge, Iowa, organized on December 11, 1848.

=== California ===
Drown was a member of the Los Angeles Common Council, the governing body of the city, in 1859–60 and 1861–62 and was Los Angeles County district attorney in 1857–59 and 1861–63. It was while he was district attorney that Pancho Daniel, the alleged killer of Sheriff James R. Barton, was taken by a mob from the county jail and lynched. Drown died in office and Alfred B. Chapman was appointed to succeed him.

Drown instituted the first Los Angeles Odd Fellows lodge.

Political offices
Preceded by Cameron E. Thom	Los Angeles County District Attorney; 1857-1859	Succeeded by Edward J. C. Kewen
Preceded by Edward J. C. Kewen	Los Angeles County District Attorney; 1861-1863	Succeeded by Alfred Chapman
