= Herschel L. Carnahan =

American politician (1879–1941)

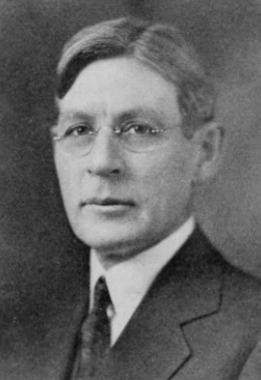

30th Lieutenant Governor of California
- In office December 4, 1928 – January 6, 1931
- Governor: C. C. Young
- Preceded by: Buron Fitts
- Succeeded by: Frank Merriam

Personal details
- Born: August 31, 1879 Aledo, Illinois, U.S.
- Died: March 31, 1941 (aged 61) Los Angeles, U.S.
- Resting place: Evergreen Cemetery (Riverside, California); 33.9799°N 117.3869°W
- Party: Republican
- Education: Monmouth College

Herschel L. Carnahan (August 31, 1879 – March 31, 1941) was the 30th lieutenant governor of California, 1928–1931, serving under Governor C. C. Young. He was a Republican.

He was born in Aledo, Illinois, and attended Monmouth College. Carnahan came to California in May 1896 at age 18, seeking treatment for tuberculosis, living at first with an uncle on a ranch at Alessandro, in Riverside County. Carnahan worked as an elementary school teacher later that year, and went on to work as a both a teacher and a school principal in Winchester. He was also active in the temperance movement.

Carnahan later studied law at a local law office, was admitted to the bar in 1904 at the age of the 25 and began practicing in Riverside, California.

Later relocating his law practice to Los Angeles, Carnahan was appointed the first commissioner of the State Corporation Department by Republican Governor Hiram Johnson in 1914. There, Carnahan enforced California's so-called blue sky law, passed in 1913 in an effort to protect small investors from promoters who pitched fraudulent investments promising everything, including the "blue sky" above. Carnahan served as commissioner until 1918.

In 1927, Carnahan was appointed a receiver in the bankruptcy of the Julian Petroleum Company. Nicknamed Julian Pete, the company collapsed after it was revealed to have overissued its stock, defrauding investors of more than $150 million. Carnahan continued to serve as receiver through his term as lieutenant governor and worked on the bankruptcy until the receivership was closed out in 1941.

Carnahan was appointed lieutenant governor in 1928 by Governor C.C. Young after Buron Fitts, elected lieutenant governor under Young, resigned to become District Attorney of Los Angeles County.

Following his term as lieutenant governor, Carnahan returned to his law practice in Los Angeles.

After a series of health issues, including the reemergence of his tuberculosis, Carnahan killed himself in April 1941, dying at the Georgia Street Receiving Hospital in Los Angeles. He was interred at the mausoleum at Evergreen Cemetery in Riverside, California.

Carnahan was married to Hattie Helmer, a native of Ottawa, Canada.

Political offices
Preceded by Buron Fitts	Lieutenant Governor of California; 1928—1931	Succeeded by Frank Merriam
