= Buron Fitts =

California politician (1895–1973)

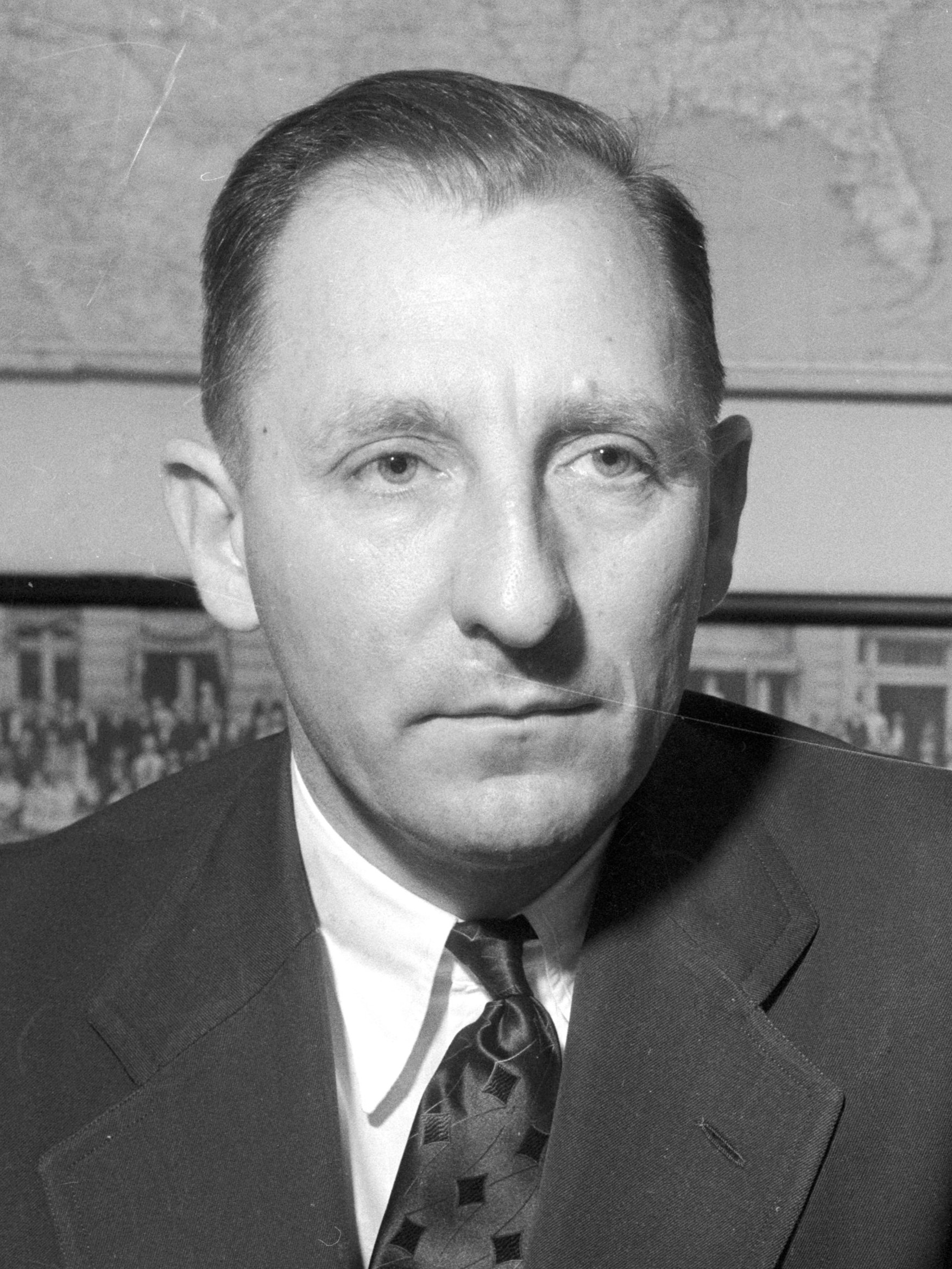
- Fitts c. 1935

29th District Attorney of Los Angeles County
- In office December 3, 1928 – December 2, 1940
- Preceded by: Asa Keyes
- Succeeded by: John F. Dockweiler

29th Lieutenant Governor of California
- In office January 4, 1927 – November 30, 1928
- Governor: C.C. Young
- Preceded by: C. C. Young
- Succeeded by: Herschel L. Carnahan

Commander of the California Department of the American Legion
- In office August 25, 1920 – August 26, 1921; Acting since May 17, 1920
- Preceded by: David Prescott Barrows
- Succeeded by: John R. Quinn

Personal details
- Born: March 22, 1895 Belcherville, Texas, U.S.
- Died: March 29, 1973 (aged 78) Three Rivers, California, U.S.
- Cause of death: Suicide by gunshot
- Resting place: Forest Lawn Memorial Park
- Party: Republican
- Spouses: Irene Wixson Shugart (m. 1919, divorced) Marion Warner Fitts (m. 1924)
- Children: Mary Lou Fitts
- Education: University of Southern California (L.L.B.)

Military service
- Allegiance: United States
- Branch/service: United States Army; Army Air Corps; Army Air Forces
- Years of service: 1917-1919; 1942-1945
- Rank: Lieutenant Colonel
- Unit: Pacific Overseas Air Technical Services Command; Air Technical Service Command
- Battles/wars: World War I; Meuse–Argonne offensive (WIA); World War II; North Africa (WIA); Europe
- Awards: Purple Heart (2); Army Commendation Medal

Buron Rogers Fitts (March 22, 1895 – March 29, 1973) was an American lawyer and politician from Los Angeles who served as the 29th lieutenant governor of California from 1927 to 1928, and as the 29th district attorney of Los Angeles County thereafter until 1940.

== Early life ==
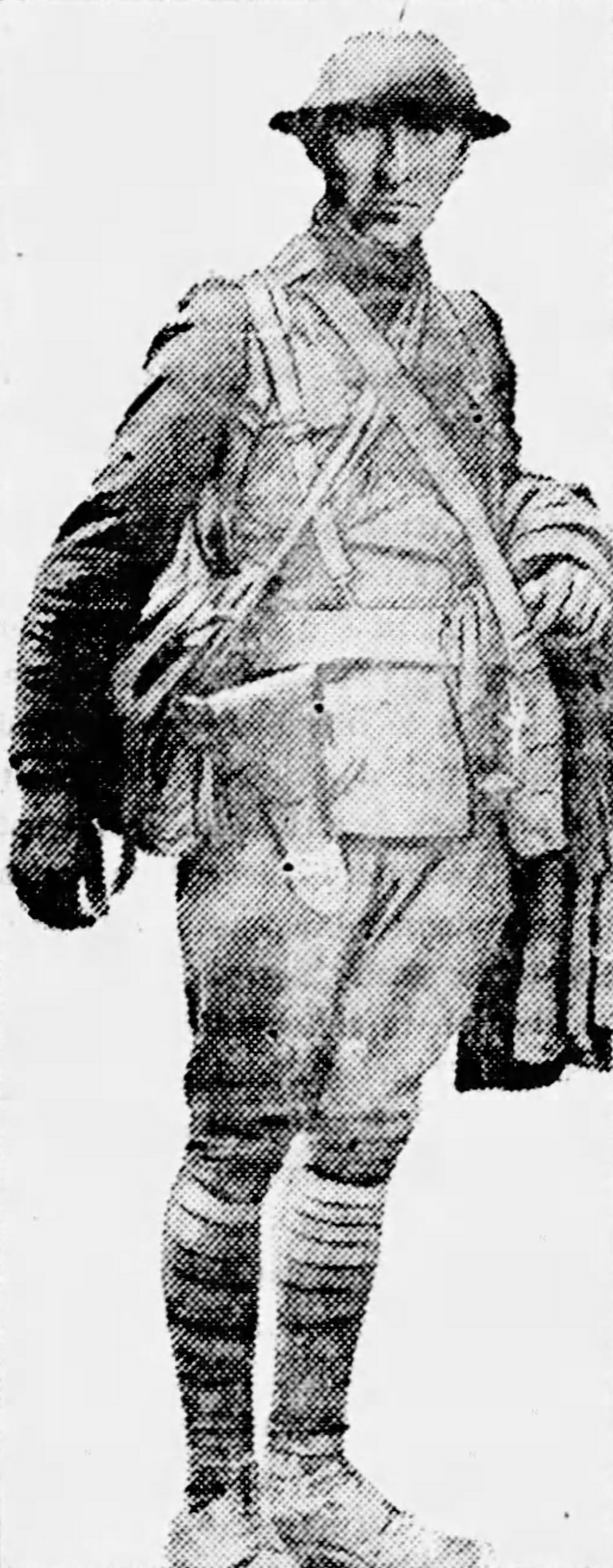
Photo of Fitts taken by San Francisco Examiner correspondent Joe Timmons on September 22, 1918, just days before the Meuse–Argonne offensive began

Born in Belcherville, Texas, Fitts received his law degree in 1916 from the University of Southern California and while a student there worked as a clerk for prominent attorney Earl Rogers.

Fitts was a severely injured veteran of World War I whose base of political support lay in the American Legion organization of war veterans. He had taken shrapnel in his right knee during the Meuse–Argonne offensive in 1918, and while recovering the same leg was broken in a train wreck. After ten years of surgeries he was forced to have the leg amputated. He also suffered from mustard gas burns, and during the 1920s he was involved in four separate plane crashes.

Fitts was elected commander of the California Department of the American Legion in 1920, serving until 1921.

== Political career ==
Fitts was appointed deputy district attorney for Los Angeles County in 1920, during the term of district attorney Thomas Lee Woolwine, and chief deputy in 1924 under Asa Keyes. Fitts was elected lieutenant governor in 1926 and served in the administration of Governor C.C. Young, from January 4, 1927, until his resignation on November 30, 1928. Governor Young appointed H. L. Carnahan as lieutenant governor to succeed Fitts on December 4, 1928.

In 1928, Keyes was indicted for bribery (in connection with the Julian Petroleum Company scandal). Fitts resigned as lieutenant governor both to become a special prosecutor in that case and to become district attorney of Los Angeles County. He was elected to that office on November 6, 1928.

Fitts was also on the payroll of Paramount Pictures. In 1930, actress Clara Bow's fiancé, Rex Bell, wrongfully accused Daisy De Voe, Bow's secretary, of embezzlement and extortion. Fitts saw to it that De Voe was arrested, not allowed to contact a lawyer, interrogated for twenty-seven straight hours and jailed without being charged. Her safe deposit box was searched without a warrant. No evidence was found, and De Voe refused to sign a confession.

She subsequently filed a false imprisonment suit against Fitts and, in retaliation, he induced a grand jury to indict her on thirty-five counts of grand theft. After three days of deliberations, the jury found De Voe not guilty on thirty-four charges, but, inexplicably, guilty on one. She served an 18-month sentence. The judge also was friendly with Paramount executives.

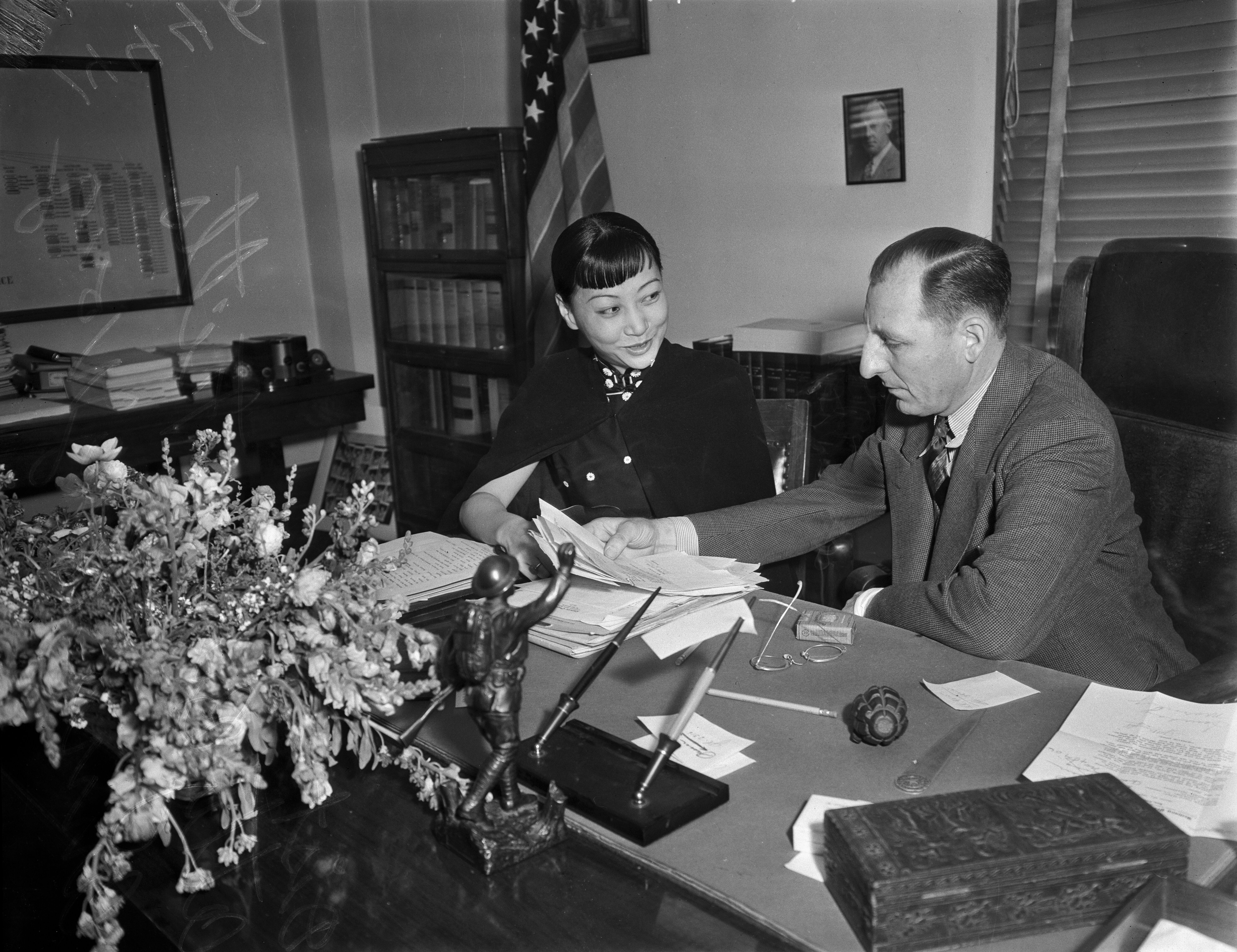
Film actress Anna May Wong looks over an extortion letter with Fitts, March 25, 1937

In 1930, Fitts ran for the Republican nomination for Governor of California, finishing third in the primary behind incumbent Governor Young and the winner, San Francisco Mayor James Rolph.

Fitts was elected to a second term as district attorney in 1932, and investigated the death of Hollywood producer-director-screenwriter Paul Bern, husband of actress Jean Harlow. Samuel Marx, in his book Deadly Illusions (1990), accused Fitts of having been bribed by Metro-Goldwyn-Mayer (MGM) studio executives to accept Bern's death as suicide, to avoid a scandal. He has also been accused of using his position to block action against the rapist of Patricia Douglas at an MGM Sales Convention in 1937, a case that was the subject of David Stenn's 2007 documentary film Girl 27.

Fitts was indicted for bribery and perjury in 1934 for allegedly taking a bribe to drop a statutory rape charge against a millionaire real-estate promoter, but was acquitted two years later.

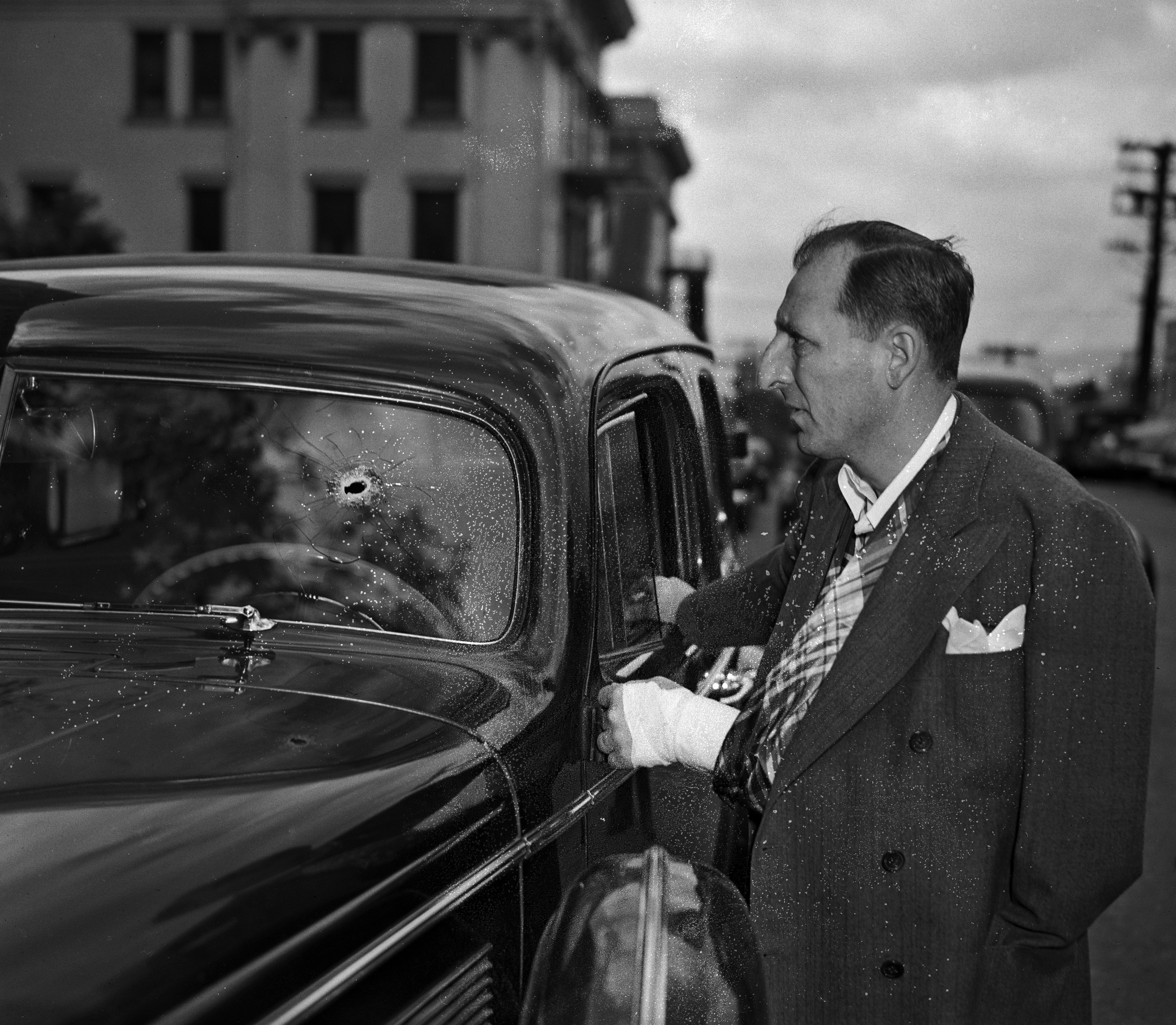
Fitts examining his car after recovering from being shot in the elbow by an unknown assailant, 1937

Despite all the lurid scandals, Fitts was elected to a third term as district attorney in 1936. On March 7, 1937, he was wounded by a volley of shots fired through the windshield of his car. No one was ever arrested for the apparent assassination attempt.

In 1940, Fitts was defeated in his bid for a fourth term as district attorney by a reform candidate, former U.S. Representative John F. Dockweiler. Fitts, John D. Fredericks (1903–1915), and Steve Cooley (2000-2012) are the only Los Angeles County district attorneys to serve three complete terms.

== Later life and death ==
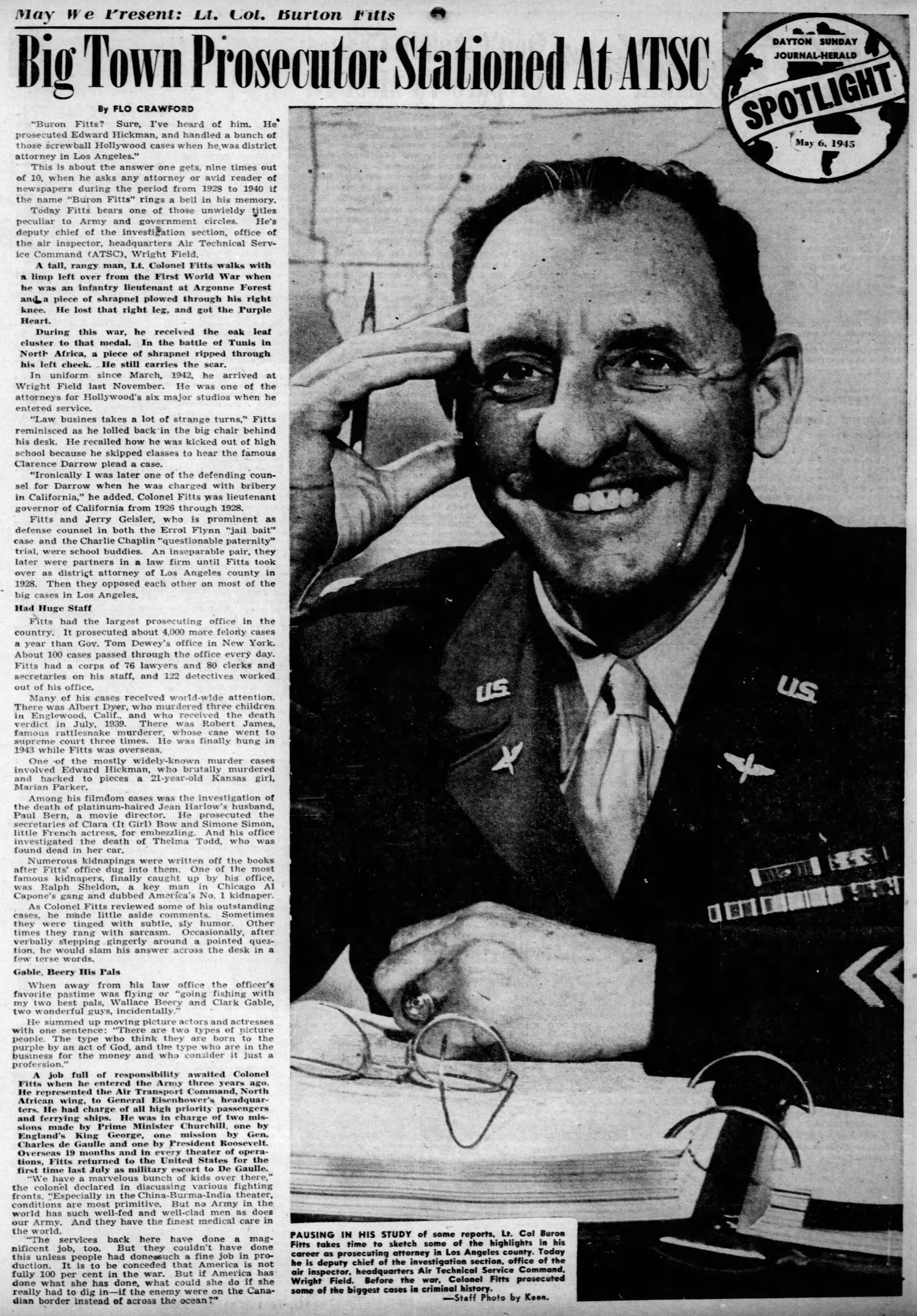
Article published in the Dayton Journal-Herald, May 6, 1945

During World War II, Fitts joined the Army Air Corps, rising to the rank of lieutenant colonel. He was chief intelligence officer for Pacific Overseas Air Technical Services, serving in North Africa and Europe. During the battle of Tunisia, he caught shrapnel to the face, leaving a scar on his left cheek. He later served as deputy chief of the investigation section, office of the air inspector, headquarters Air Technical Service Command, Wright Field.

After returning to California, Fitts remained active in politics. He considered running for Attorney General of California in 1946, but ultimately chose not to, instead resuming the practice of law. Later that year, he endorsed Richard M. Nixon in the election for California's 12th congressional district, urging voters to "send Richard Nixon to Congress, a man who will talk American to the people of his district and at the same time vote American in Congress. Nixon will fight, in and out of Congress, to perpetuate and continue in this country American ideals and American freedom." When Nixon ran for U.S. Senate in 1950, Fitts announced his candidacy to succeed him in the House, but withdrew from the race less than two weeks later.

Fitts' last residence was in Three Rivers, in Tulare County, California, where he killed himself with a pistol shot to the head on March 29, 1973.

== Sources ==
- For the People — Inside the Los Angeles County District Attorney's Office 1850-2000 (2001) by Michael Parrish. ISBN 1-883318-15-7
- He Usually Lived With a Female: The Life of a California Newspaperman (2006) by George Garrigues. Quail Creek Press. ISBN 0-9634830-1-3
- Deadly Illusions by Samuel Marx and Joyce Vanderveen (Random House, New York, 1990), re-published as Murder Hollywood Style - Who Killed Jean Harlow's Husband? (Arrow, 1994, ISBN 0-09-961060-4)

Political offices
Preceded by C. C. Young	Lieutenant Governor of California; 1927—1928	Succeeded by H. L. Carnahan
