= Patricia Douglas =

American dancer, movie extra and rape victim

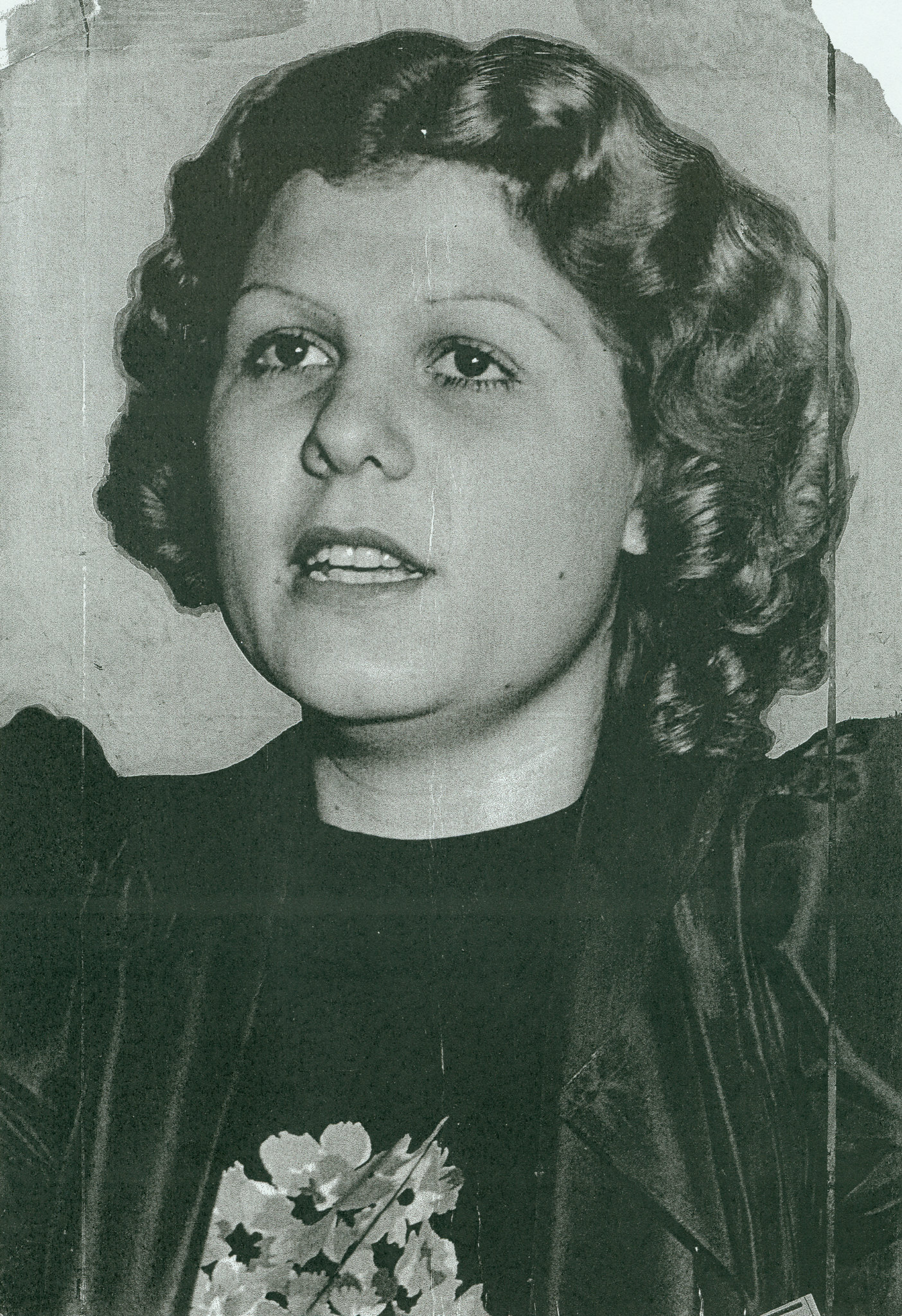
- Born: Dorothy Shellenberger; March 24, 1917; Kansas City, Missouri, US
- Died: November 11, 2003 (aged 86); Las Vegas, Nevada, US
- Children: 1

Patricia Dorothy Douglas (March 24, 1917 – November 11, 2003) was an American dancer and movie extra. Douglas was the subject of the documentary Girl 27 documenting her 1937 rape by Metro-Goldwyn-Mayer (MGM) salesman David Ross and the aftermath. Douglas was one of the first people to come forward after experiencing sexual assault in the film industry, leading to a massive scandal that MGM buried by initiating a smear campaign against Douglas, and by buying-off potential prosecution witnesses.

Douglas left the industry after her rape, but appeared on camera 65 years later, having been contacted by biographer David Stenn, who discovered that she was still alive while investigating the story of the 1937 rape and cover-up.

== Early life and career ==
Patricia Douglas was born Dorothy Shellenberger on March 24, 1917. At some point, the mother and daughter moved to Los Angeles, California, to pursue work in the film industry. Douglas dropped out of school at the age of 14, changed her name to Patricia Douglas, and focused on pursuing a film career, working as a dancer and extra, appearing in So This Is Africa and Gold Diggers of 1933.

== 1937 sexual assault ==
On the evening of May 5, 1937, the 20-year-old Douglas, with more than 120 other young women, most of them dancers, was taken to work at an MGM party, which was part of a convention held to reward MGM sales executives for a new sales formula which had proved very lucrative. The young women hired that night were led to believe that they would be working on a film. At the party, Douglas was targeted by Ross and was forced to drink. When she ran outside to vomit, Ross followed her, dragged her into a car in a nearby field, and raped her.

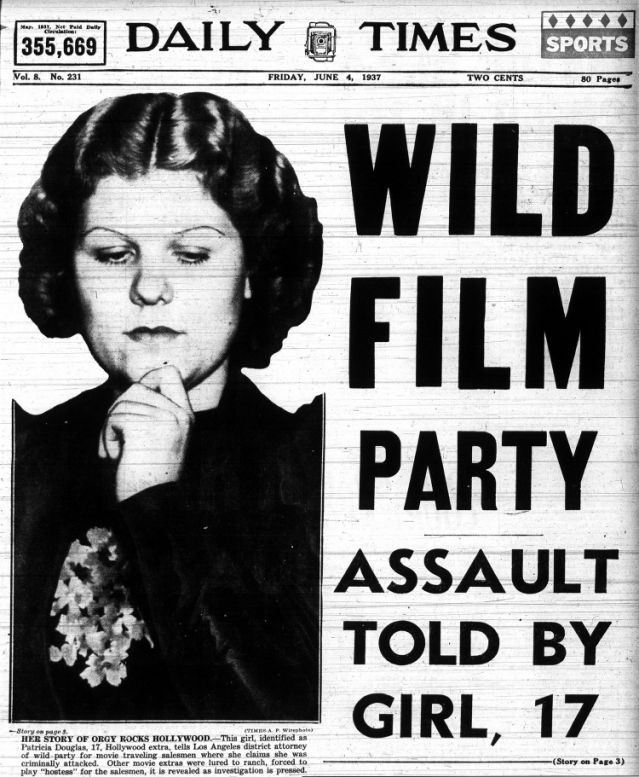
Front page of the Chicago Daily Times, featuring the Douglas case

After the rape, a parking attendant heard Douglas screaming and saw her staggering as Ross ran away. Douglas was brought to Culver City Community Hospital, where she was douched, thus destroying evidence of the rape, before being examined by Edward Lindquist, who co-owned the hospital. His practice was largely dependent on MGM, and he testified later that he believed there had been no intercourse.

Douglas filed a criminal complaint with the Los Angeles County District Attorney's office. The district attorney at the time was Buron Fitts, a personal friend of MGM studio chief Louis B. Mayer. When Douglas' case was ignored, she went to attorney William J. F. Brown, who delivered an ultimatum to Fitts' office, insisting that it either investigate the complaint or Douglas would go to the media.

The resulting scandal was one of the largest Hollywood had ever faced. MGM responded by running a smear campaign against Douglas, tarnishing her reputation and framing her as immoral and promiscuous. An article in the Los Angeles Examiner on June 4, 1937, published Douglas's name, photo and home address, but did not name the studio.

The grand jury hearing dominated the news cycle, despite other significant stories such as the marriage of the abdicated Edward VIII and Wallis Simpson, and the death of actress Jean Harlow.

When the grand jury refused to indict Ross, Douglas filed a civil suit against studio personnel and the other party attendees in Los Angeles Superior Court. When that suit was dismissed in February 1938, she sued again in federal court, alleging a civil rights violation. David Stenn, in a 2003 article about the case in Vanity Fair, claimed this was the first time a woman had filed a suit in federal court claiming that a rape violated her civil rights. For unknown reasons, Brown failed to appear in court and the federal case was dismissed for want of prosecution. Stenn theorized that, because Brown was running against Fitts for the office of district attorney, he may have feared that litigating the case would undermine his campaign.

== Later life ==
Douglas left the industry after her assault and struggled with her relationships in life as a result of the mental and emotional trauma she experienced from the rape and subsequent smear campaign by MGM. She was married three times and gave birth to one daughter. Douglas died in November 2003, aged 86.

== Legacy ==
More than 60 years after Douglas' assault, it was documented by David Stenn in his film Girl 27. Her speaking out against her rapist was re-evaluated following the emergence of the #MeToo movement. Rose McGowan praised the film and the telling of Douglas's story.
