= California Department of Financial Institutions =

US state government department

Department of Financial Institutions
Department overview
- Formed: July 1, 1997
- Dissolved: July 1, 2013
- Superseding department: Department of Business Oversight
- Jurisdiction: California
- Headquarters: San Francisco, California
- Department executive: Commissioner of Business Oversight
- Parent department: Business, Transportation and Housing Agency

The California Department of Financial Institutions (DFI) was a government department of the California Business, Transportation and Housing Agency responsible for financial regulation of California's banking system.

Pursuant to the Governor's Reorganization Plan No. 2 of 2012, the Department of Financial Institutions and Department of Corporations became divisions of the California Department of Business Oversight (DBO) on July 1, 2013.
