= 1930 California gubernatorial election =

- November 4, 1930
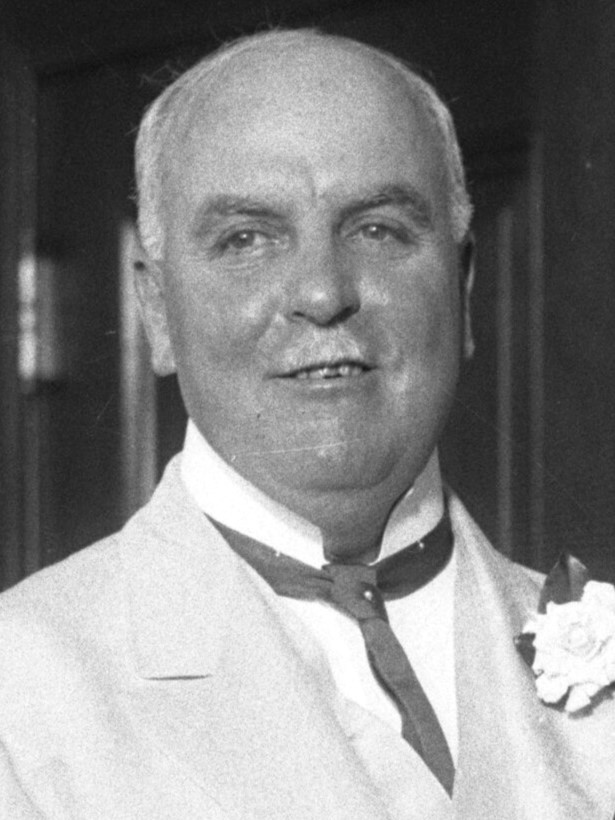

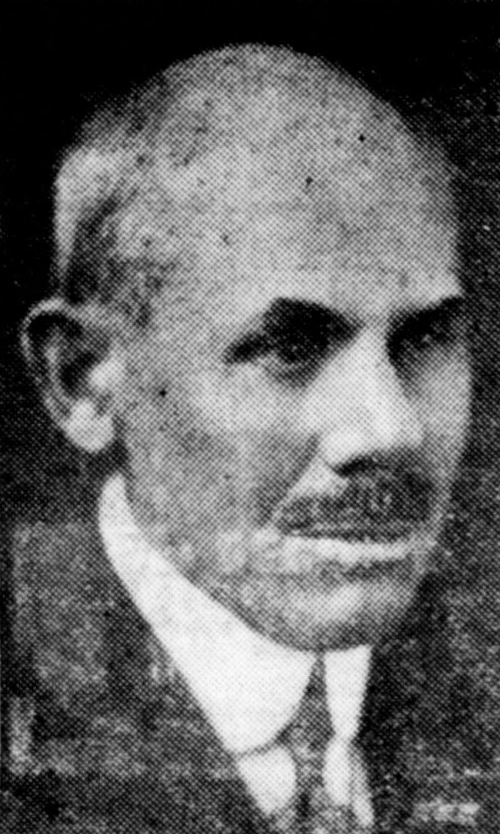
Nominee	James Rolph	Milton K. Young
Party	Republican	Democratic
Popular vote	999,393	333,973
Percentage	72.22%	24.13%
- County results Rolph: 50–60% 60–70% 70–80% 80–90% >90%
Governor before election
C. C. Young
Republican
Elected Governor
James Rolph Jr.
Republican

The 1930 California gubernatorial election was held on November 4, 1930. San Francisco mayor James Rolph was elected in a landslide over Milton K. Young. This was the last of three consecutive elections in which the incumbent lost the Republican primary.

In the Republican primary, Rolph defeated incumbent governor C. C. Young and Los Angeles County district attorney Buron Fitts in a three-way race. Fitts won the Prohibition Party primary, but under the Hawson amendment, he was not able to accept the nomination, because he lost his own party's primary. Milton K. Young won the Democratic primary without intraparty opposition.

For the second consecutive election, the Republican nominee won a landslide. Rolph became the second candidate (after Young in 1926) to sweep every county in a governor's election, and set new records with over 72 percent of the vote and a majority of over 665,000 votes over Young.

== Primary election results ==
=== Candidates ===
- Buron Fitts (R), Los Angeles County District Attorney
- James Rolph Jr. (R), Mayor of San Francisco
- C. C. Young (R), incumbent Governor
- Clara Shortridge Foltz (R), Deputy District Attorney of Los Angeles County
- Milton K. Young (D) (also cross-filed in Republican primary)
- Upton Sinclair (S), writer and activist

=== Results ===
Republican primary results
Party	Candidate	Votes	%
Republican	James Rolph Jr.	377,390	36.15%
Republican	C. C. Young (incumbent)	356,765	34.17%
Republican	Buron Fitts	292,743	28.04%
Republican	Milton K. Young	15,583	1.30%
Republican	Clara Shortridge Foltz	3,570	0.34%
Total votes		1,044,051	100.00%

Democratic primary results
Party	Candidate	Votes	%
Democratic	Milton K. Young	93,499	81.35%
Democratic	James Rolph Jr. (write-in)	9,271	8.07%
Democratic	C. C. Young (write-in)	6,809	5.92%
Democratic	Buron Fitts (write-in)	5,357	4.66%
Total votes		114,936	100.00%

Socialist primary results
Party	Candidate	Votes	%
Socialist	Upton Sinclair	3,367	100.00%
Total votes		3,367	100.00%

Prohibition primary results
Party	Candidate	Votes	%
Prohibition	Buron Fitts (write-in) (Note: Disqualified after losing the Republican primary)	1,967	67.62%
Prohibition	C. C. Young (write-in)	942	32.38%
Total votes		2,909	100.00%

== General election results ==
1930 California gubernatorial election
Party	Candidate	Votes	%	±%
Republican	James Rolph Jr.	999,393	72.15%	+0.93%
Democratic	Milton K. Young	333,973	24.11%	−0.58%
Socialist	Upton Sinclair	50,480	3.64%	−0.37%
	Scattering	1,283	0.09%	
Majority		665,420	48.04%	
Total votes		1,385,129	100.00%	
Republican hold		Swing	+1.51%	

=== Results by county ===
County	James Rolph Republican		Milton K. Young Democratic		Upton Sinclair Socialist		Scattering Write-in		Margin		Total votes cast
County	#	%	#	%	#	%	#	%	#	%	Total votes cast
Alameda	108,258	81.08%	18,797	14.08%	6,139	4.60%	334	0.25%	89,461	67.00%	133,528
Alpine	56	96.55%	1	1.72%	1	1.72%	0	0.00%	55	94.83%	58
Amador	1,278	82.29%	245	15.78%	30	1.93%	0	0.00%	1,033	66.52%	1,553
Butte	6,991	72.78%	2,236	23.28%	379	3.95%	0	0.00%	4,755	49.50%	9,606
Calaveras	1,696	79.51%	359	16.83%	70	3.28%	8	0.38%	1,337	62.68%	2,133
Colusa	2,214	73.46%	745	24.72%	55	1.82%	0	0.00%	1,469	48.74%	3,014
Contra Costa	15,673	80.24%	3,134	16.04%	726	3.72%	0	0.00%	12,539	64.19%	19,533
Del Norte	1,600	86.02%	203	10.91%	57	3.06%	0	0.00%	1,397	75.11%	1,860
El Dorado	2,299	80.81%	463	16.27%	83	2.92%	0	0.00%	1,836	64.53%	2,845
Fresno	25,211	69.60%	9,925	27.40%	1,068	2.95%	18	0.05%	15,286	42.20%	36,222
Glenn	2,326	68.84%	961	28.44%	86	2.55%	6	0.18%	1,365	40.40%	3,379
Humboldt	11,594	86.24%	1,452	10.80%	398	2.96%	0	0.00%	10,142	75.44%	13,444
Imperial	6,509	70.44%	2,475	26.78%	257	2.78%	0	0.00%	4,034	43.65%	9,241
Inyo	1,800	76.01%	474	20.02%	94	3.97%	0	0.00%	1,326	56.00%	2,368
Kern	13,388	75.08%	3,890	21.81%	554	3.11%	0	0.00%	9,498	53.26%	17,832
Kings	4,563	69.20%	1,831	27.77%	198	3.00%	2	0.03%	2,732	41.43%	6,594
Lake	2,266	73.00%	736	23.71%	99	3.19%	3	0.10%	1,530	49.29%	3,104
Lassen	2,223	77.40%	542	18.87%	107	3.73%	0	0.00%	1,681	58.53%	2,872
Los Angeles	299,417	61.77%	164,656	33.97%	20,075	4.14%	565	0.12%	134,761	27.80%	484,713
Madera	3,060	66.74%	1,375	29.99%	146	3.18%	4	0.09%	1,685	36.75%	4,585
Marin	11,775	86.01%	1,447	10.57%	468	3.42%	0	0.00%	10,328	75.44%	13,690
Mariposa	747	79.64%	165	17.59%	26	2.77%	0	0.00%	582	62.05%	938
Mendocino	6,833	79.69%	1,496	17.45%	224	2.61%	21	0.24%	5,337	62.25%	8,574
Merced	4,987	65.84%	2,325	30.70%	262	3.46%	0	0.00%	2,662	35.15%	7,574
Modoc	1,181	76.14%	322	20.76%	48	3.09%	0	0.00%	859	55.38%	1,551
Mono	394	82.95%	58	12.21%	23	4.84%	0	0.00%	336	70.74%	475
Monterey	8,368	79.22%	1,870	17.70%	325	3.08%	0	0.00%	6,498	61.52%	10,563
Napa	5,658	77.53%	1,498	20.53%	135	1.85%	7	0.10%	4,160	57.00%	7,298
Nevada	3,482	82.20%	614	14.49%	140	3.31%	0	0.00%	2,868	67.71%	4,236
Orange	18,039	55.22%	14,019	42.91%	601	1.84%	8	0.02%	4,020	12.31%	32,667
Placer	4,847	76.81%	1,194	18.92%	269	4.26%	0	0.00%	3,653	57.89%	6,310
Plumas	1,659	84.56%	252	12.84%	51	2.60%	0	0.00%	1,407	71.71%	1,962
Riverside	10,789	72.42%	3,612	24.24%	497	3.34%	0	0.00%	7,177	48.17%	14,898
Sacramento	30,685	86.13%	4,082	11.46%	858	2.41%	0	0.00%	26,603	74.68%	35,625
San Benito	1,816	74.92%	556	22.94%	45	1.86%	7	0.29%	1,260	51.98%	2,424
San Bernardino	19,457	67.99%	8,242	28.80%	919	3.21%	0	0.00%	11,215	39.19%	28,618
San Diego	41,835	72.49%	13,985	24.23%	1,887	3.27%	2	0.00%	27,850	48.26%	57,709
San Francisco	130,547	86.11%	15,189	10.02%	5,845	3.86%	17	0.01%	115,358	76.09%	151,598
San Joaquin	24,704	81.30%	4,891	16.10%	760	2.50%	33	0.11%	19,813	65.20%	30,388
San Luis Obispo	7,192	74.88%	2,027	21.10%	386	4.02%	0	0.00%	5,165	53.77%	9,605
San Mateo	18,556	85.44%	2,361	10.87%	781	3.60%	21	0.10%	16,195	74.57%	21,719
Santa Barbara	10,611	80.80%	2,156	16.42%	350	2.67%	15	0.11%	8,455	64.38%	13,132
Santa Clara	35,991	79.21%	8,088	17.80%	1,277	2.81%	83	0.18%	27,903	61.41%	45,439
Santa Cruz	8,222	73.86%	2,598	23.34%	296	2.66%	16	0.14%	5,624	50.52%	11,132
Shasta	4,033	79.34%	854	16.80%	196	3.86%	0	0.00%	3,179	62.54%	5,083
Sierra	827	81.88%	157	15.54%	26	2.57%	0	0.00%	670	66.34%	1,010
Siskiyou	5.511	78.74%	1,223	17.47%	265	3.79%	0	0.00%	4,288	61.27%	6,999
Solano	9,658	82.22%	1,745	14.86%	343	2.92%	0	0.00%	7,913	67.37%	11,746
Sonoma	16,788	79.56%	3,855	18.27%	458	2.17%	0	0.00%	12,933	61.29%	21,101
Stanislaus	7,860	54.89%	5,866	40.97%	546	3.81%	47	0.33%	1,994	13.93%	14,319
Sutter	3,284	76.98%	848	19.88%	134	3.14%	0	0.00%	2,436	57.10%	4,266
Tehama	2,488	60.34%	1,444	35.02%	183	4.44%	8	0.19%	1,044	25.32%	4,123
Trinity	928	79.32%	182	15.56%	60	5.13%	0	0.00%	746	63.76%	1,170
Tulare	10,286	62.76%	5,517	33.66%	557	3.40%	30	0.18%	4,769	29.10%	16,390
Tuolumne	2,234	75.35%	618	20.84%	113	3.81%	0	0.00%	1,616	54.50%	2,965
Ventura	8,130	73.24%	2,610	23.51%	345	3.11%	16	0.14%	5,520	49.73%	11,101
Yolo	4,206	77.06%	1,147	21.02%	97	1.78%	8	0.15%	3,059	56.05%	5,458
Yuba	2,363	84.73%	360	12.91%	62	2.22%	4	0.14%	2,003	71.82%	2,789
Total	999,393	72.15%	333,973	24.11%	50,480	3.64%	1,283	0.09%	665,420	48.04%	1,385,129
