= Wine Institute (California) =

Public policy advocacy organization

- Founded: 1934
- Tax ID no.: 94-0987020
- Legal status: 501(c)(6)
- Headquarters: San Francisco, California, U.S.
- President, Chief Executive Officer: Robert P. Koch
- Chairman (2019-2020): Hank Wetzel
- Revenue: $22,327,401 (2016)
- Expenses: $21,144,497 (2016)
- Employees: 43 (2015)
- Website: www.wineinstitute.org

The Wine Institute is a public policy advocacy organization representing over 1,000 California wineries and affiliated businesses. Led by Bobby Koch, its mission is "to initiate state, federal, and international public policy to enhance the environment for the responsible production, consumption and enjoyment of wine." The Wine Institute is the only advocacy group representing the California wine industry at the state, federal and international levels.

The organization's initiatives include:

- a partnership with the California Travel and Tourism Commission to showcase California's wine and food offerings
- an export program providing marketing support for California wines outside the US with trade representation in 16 countries
- promotion of sustainable winegrowing, in conjunction with the California Association of Winegrape Growers

The Institute is based in San Francisco, with offices in Sacramento, Washington, D.C., six regions of the United States and 16 countries abroad.

== See also ==
- Leon Adams, co-founder of the Wine Institute
