= Rancho Cañada de los Nogales =

Mexican land grant in California

Coordinates: 34.110°N 118.230°W

Rancho Cañada de los Nogales was a 1,200-acre (4.9 km^{2}) Mexican land grant in present day Los Angeles County, California, given in 1844 by Governor Manuel Micheltorena to José Maria Aguilar. The name means "canyon of the walnut trees" and refers to stands of California Black Walnut trees. The grant extended along the east bank of the Los Angeles River opposite Rancho Los Feliz, and encompassed present day Cypress Park, Mt. Washington and Highland Park. The grant adjoined Rancho San Rafael to the north.

== History ==
José Maria Aguilar was a Los Angeles official, and married Maria Ygnacia Elizalde. Their son Cristobal Aguilar (1816–1883) was a prominent Los Angeles politician and Mayor of Los Angeles, California. José Maria Aguilar was granted the half square league Rancho Cañada de los Nogales in 1844.

With the cession of California to the United States following the Mexican–American War, the 1848 Treaty of Guadalupe Hidalgo provided that the land grants would be honored. As required by the Land Act of 1851, a claim for Rancho Cañada de los Nogales was filed with the Public Land Commission in 1852, and the grant was patented to José Maria Aguilar in 1882.

Aguilar sold the Rancho to Los Angeles lawyer Lewis Granger in 1853. Lewis C. Granger came from Ohio to Los Angeles in 1850. He was a partner, with Jonathan R. Scott, who owned Rancho La Cañada, in the law firm Scott & Granger. In 1854 Granger traded Rancho Cañada de los Nogales to J.D. Hunter in exchange for a Hunter's brick home in Los Angeles. In 1855 Granger bought 2,700 acres (10.9 km^{2}) of Rancho San Rafael along the Los Angeles River from the Verdugos. In 1857 Granger moved to Oroville.

Jesse Divine Hunter (1806–1877), born Kentucky, married Keziah Brown (1808–1889) in 1825. Hunter came to California in 1847 as Captain of Company B in the Iowa Volunteers which soon became known as the Mormon Battalion. Captain Hunter stayed in California after his discharge in 1847. He was appointed U. S. Indian agent for southern California and moved to San Luis Rey. In 1852, Hunter was living in the Mormon settlement of San Bernardino. After the Mormon settlement in San Bernardino was abandoned, Hunter moved to Los Angeles, where he became a brick manufacturer and businessman. In 1854, he moved to Rancho Cañada de los Nogales. In 1859 Hunter bought the southern tip of Rancho San Rafael, adjacent to Rancho Cañada de los Nogales. In 1882, Keziah Hunter sold Rancho Cañada de los Nogales to developers George W. Morgan and Albert H. Judson.
