= Lewis Granger =

American politician

Lewis C. Cranger
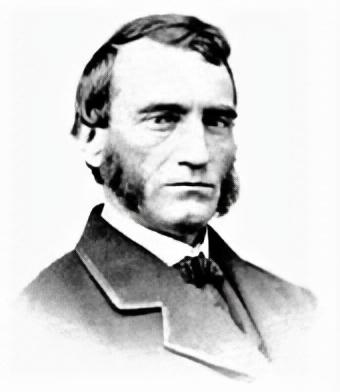

Member of the California State Assembly from the 9th district
- In office January 3, 1887 - January 7, 1889
- Preceded by: John M. Ward
- Succeeded by: Lewis Burwell

Personal details
- Born: May 17, 1820 Granville, Ohio, US
- Died: May 20, 1890 (aged 70) Oroville, California, US
- Party: Democratic

Lewis Cass Granger (May 17, 1820 - May 20, 1890) born in Granville, Ohio, was a member of the Los Angeles, California, Common Council, the legislative body of that city, in 1854. It was he who made a successful motion at the May 4, 1854, session that the minutes of the Common Council were thenceforth to be written "in both Spanish and English, on alternate pages." Granger was the Los Angeles city attorney in 1855–1856.

Granger came from Ohio to Los Angeles in 1850. He was a partner, with Jonathan R. Scott, who owned Rancho La Cañada, in the law firm Scott & Granger. In 1854 Granger traded Rancho Cañada de los Nogales to J.D. Hunter in exchange for a Hunter's brick home in Los Angeles. In 1855 Granger bought 2,700 acres (10.9 km^{2}) of Rancho San Rafael along the Los Angeles River from the Verdugos. In 1857 Granger moved to Oroville, California.

Granger also served as a member of California State Assembly for the 9th district from January 3, 1887 - January 7, 1889.

On May 20, 1890. Granger died in his home from acute pneumonia.

Preceded by Isaac Hartman	Los Angeles City Attorney; 1855–56	Succeeded by Cameron E. Thom
