= Edward Falles Spence =

American politician (1832-1892)

Edward Fallis Spence
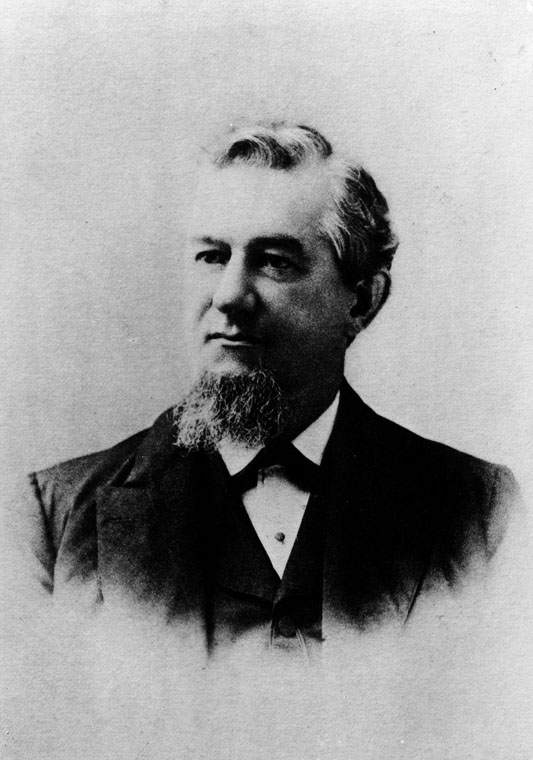
- E. F. Spence in 1885

17th Mayor of Los Angeles
- In office December 9, 1884 – December 14, 1886
- Preceded by: Cameron E. Thom
- Succeeded by: William H. Workman

President of the Los Angeles Common Council
- In office December 11, 1880 – December 10, 1881
- Preceded by: William B. Lawlor
- Succeeded by: John P. Moran

Personal details
- Born: December 22, 1832 Enniskillen, Ireland (United Kingdom and Great Britain
- Died: September 19, 1892 (aged 59) Los Angeles, California

Edward Fallis Spence (December 22, 1832 – September 19, 1892) was a banker, entrepreneur and property developer who was a member of the California legislature, a Nevada County official and the mayor of Los Angeles from 1884 to 1886.

== Personal ==
Spence was born on December 22, 1832, in Enniskillen, Ireland, the son of Gabriel Spence. He was educated there by private tutors, and at the age of 20 he emigrated to America and worked on a farm near Philadelphia, Pennsylvania, for several months, then shipped to California via the Nicaragua route, arriving in San Francisco in December 1852. He spent some twenty years in Northern California and Nevada, settling in San Jose, California.

After some years spent in San Jose and San Diego, he returned to Ireland in 1872, where he married his second wife, Anna Maria Spence, who was from Five Mile Town, County Tyrone, Ireland. He returned with his bride to the newly established Monrovia. Together they had four children, William Glenn, George Edward, Albert Harry and Kathleen. He had two other children, Nellie J. and J. Porter, from his first wife.

Spence died of heart failure September 19, 1892, in the home of a friend, John A. Fairchild, on Burlington Avenue near Ninth Street, in today's Westlake district, Los Angeles. He was 59 years old. The September 22 obsequies, which began in the family home on Burlington Avenue, were said to be "in point of attendance one of the largest ever held in this city" and the funeral procession to Evergreen Cemetery "one of the largest ever witnessed."

== Vocation ==
Spence gained his knowledge of business affairs through assisting his father in the management of the family's large farming tracts and herds of cattle in Ireland. He engaged in mining In Northern California and Nevada, but in San Jose he "controlled an extensive drug business" and then switched to banking. As well, he was one of the organizers of the Commercial Bank of San Diego.

In 1875 Spence was named cashier of the Commercial Bank of Los Angeles, organized by John Edward Hollenbeck and reorganized in 1880 as the Commercial State Bank, the forerunner of the First National Bank of Los Angeles, of which Spence became president in 1881. He held interest in other banks as well, and owned property in Whittier and Monrovia, California.

Spence was also responsible for building the first horse car line across the Los Angeles River and, in 1886, financing the first electric car line in Los Angeles.

== Public service ==
A Republican, Spence was elected to the California State Assembly from Nevada County in 1860 and was later the treasurer of that county.

On December 5, 1879, Spence was elected to represent the 3rd Ward on the Los Angeles Common Council, the legislative branch of the city government, and he served until December 10, 1881.

He was mayor of the city from December 9, 1884, to December 14, 1886, and under his mayoralty the city reorganized the Police Department and the Fire Department and placed all the personnel on salary. In his final year as mayor, the city retired its last zanja, or open fresh-water ditch.

== University of Southern California ==
Spence was one of the founders of the University of Southern California, which was then called Methodist College, and he was on its board of directors. He promised to donate some of his property, "including the lot at the corner of Pearl and Sixth streets (on which the Gates Hotel now stands)" to USC so that it might be sold and the proceeds used to place a telescope on the summit of Mount Wilson. University President Marion M. Bovard ordered a lens from the Cambridge manufactory Alvan Clark & Sons, but Spence died before the deal could be completed, so Bovard had to sell the glass to the University of Chicago. Another source said that Spence had agreed to give the cash sum of $50,000 to fund the telescope project, but it was later reported that the gift was indeed in the form of land that eventually lost its value and the USC contract with "a French firm for a forty-inch telescope, the largest in the world", had to be canceled.
