= William B. Lawlor =

American politician

President of the Los Angeles Common Council
- In office December 5, 1879 – December 11, 1880
- Preceded by: Samuel J. Beck
- Succeeded by: Edward Falles Spence

Member of the Los Angeles Common Council from the 5th ward
- In office December 5, 1878 – December 11, 1880
- Preceded by: District established
- Succeeded by: Walter Scott Moore

Personal details
- Party: Democratic

William B. Lawlor was an educator and a member of the Los Angeles, California, Common Council in 1878–1880. He was council president in 1879–1880.

== Career ==
Lawlor was president of the Lawlor Institute at 108 Main Street in the 1870s, a "select day school' that promised that "girls and boys [would] receive a useful, practical and complete English education," including "the ordinary School Branches and Double-Entry Book-Keeping and Algebra."

He was also a trustee of the Los Angeles Library Association, organized in December 1872 to provide a public library for Los Angeles with a "small stock of books being obtained, partly from proceeds of the life membership fees and partly from monthly dues." The other members were Governor J. G. Downey, S. B. Caswell, H. K. W. Bent, Colonel G. H. Smith, Judge Ygnacio Sepulveda, W. H. Mace, A. W. Potts, T. W. Temple, R. H. Dalton, General George Stoneman, General McConnell and Harris Newmark. In April 1878 the association went out of business, turning its assets and its liabilities over to the Los Angeles Public Library.
