= Julian Petroleum Corporation =

Failed California company

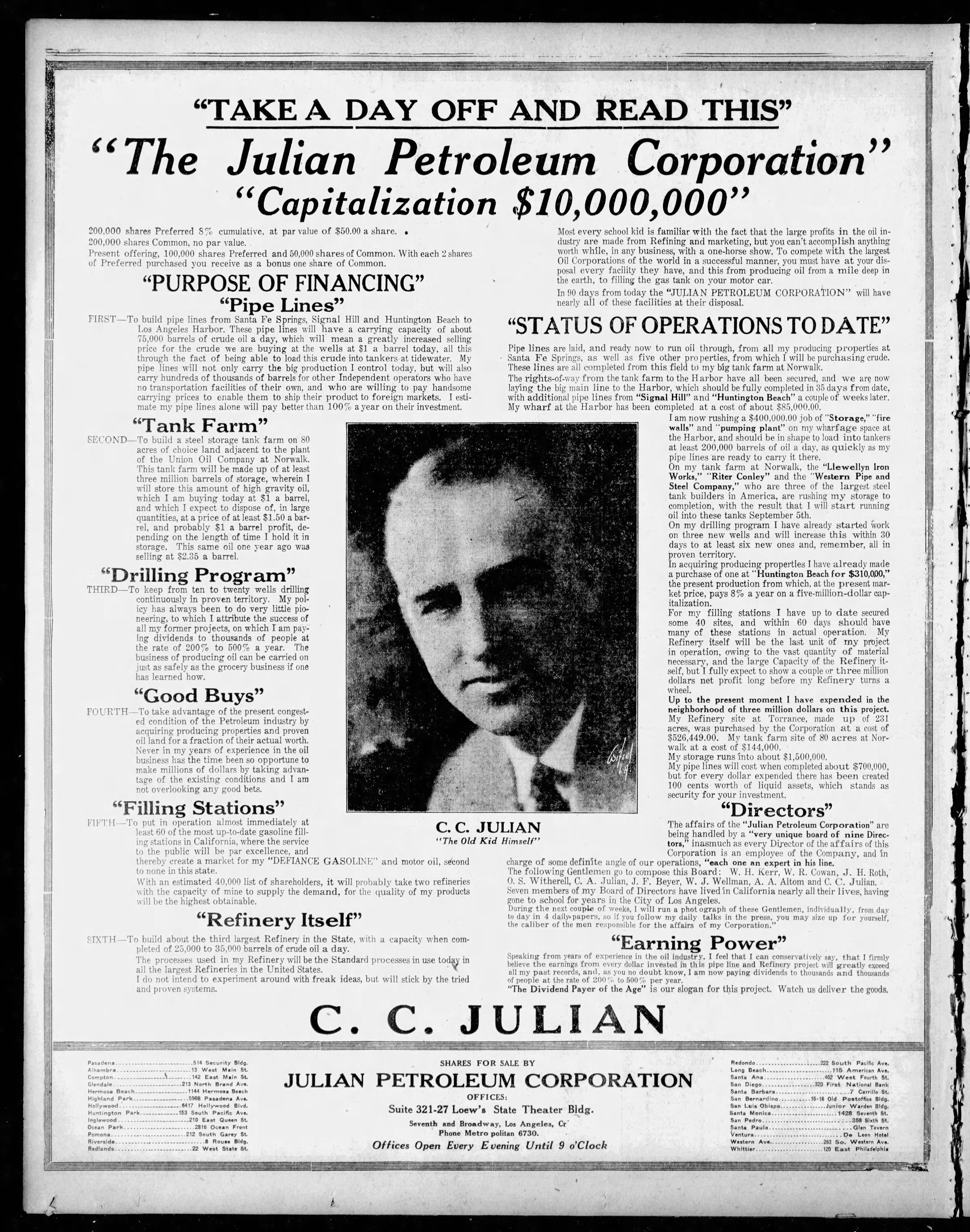
- Industry: Oil
- Founded: 1923 in Los Angeles, California
- Founder: Courtney Chauncey ("C.C.") Julian
- Defunct: 1927
- Fate: Dissolved
- Key people: S.C. Lewis, Jacob Berman and stockbroker Ed Rosenberg

Julian Petroleum Corporation (nicknamed "Julian Pete") was a Los Angeles-based oil company. It collapsed in 1927 amid large-scale fraud, taking over $150 million from 40,000 investors.

== Background ==
Julian Petroleum was started by Courtney Chauncey ("C.C.") Julian in 1923. C.C. Julian had been successful the previous year in drilling for oil in Santa Fe Springs, California. The company sought out investors with colorful advertising such as: "Widows and Orphans, This Is No Investment for You! ... My appeal is addressed to people who can legitimately afford to take a chance." However, the California Corporations Commission began investigating the company for fraudulent sales promotions.

== Downfall ==
In 1925, C.C. Julian sold his interest in the company for $500,000 to Sheridan C. (S.C.) Lewis and Jacob Berman (alias Jack Bennett). The following year the company merged with California-Eastern Oil Company. An audit revealed the company had issued 4,200,000 unauthorized shares of stock and on May 5, 1927, the Los Angeles Stock Exchange halted trading in Julian Petroleum. The company had created financial pools from 400 prominent local businessmen, including Cecil B. DeMille and Louis B. Mayer, to support the over-issuance of stock. The funds were loaned to Julian Pete for short terms at high interest rates. A number of these investors were charged with violating state usury law but either the charges were dropped or they were acquitted.

== Aftermath ==
S.C. Lewis, Jacob Berman and stockbroker Ed Rosenberg were acquitted in May 1928 on charges involving the Julian Pete fraud. However, District Attorney Asa Keyes was charged with accepting about $100,000 in bribes from Julian Petroleum officials in connection with the acquittal of the accused officials. Buron Fitts, who was the lieutenant governor, resigned in 1928 and was elected Los Angeles County District Attorney and appointed prosecutor in Keyes' trial.

Keyes was found guilty in February 1929 and sentenced to one to 14 years in prison. Two of the jurors who had voted for acquittal were also convicted of accepting bribes. Keyes served 19 months before being pardoned by Governor James Rolph.

S.C. Lewis and Jacob Berman were convicted in November 1928 and were sentenced to seven years in prison on charges relating to the sale of nearly $1 million in gold bonds of the Lewis Oil Company.

C.C. Julian faced charges in 1931 in Oklahoma of conspiracy to defraud investors of $3.5 million. He then jumped bail and fled to Shanghai, China, where he committed suicide in March 1934.

Financier Motley H. Flint was shot and killed in July 1930 in a courtroom by machinist Frank D. Keaton. Keaton said that he lost $35,000 in Julian Pete stock and blamed Flint. Flint was formerly a vice-president of the Pacific Southwest Trust and Savings Bank and had been indicted several times, but the charges were dismissed or he was acquitted. He was awaiting trial on another indictment when he was killed.
