= California Business, Transportation and Housing Agency =

Former California cabinet-level agency

Business, Transportation and Housing Agency
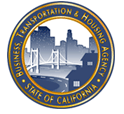

Agency overview
- Dissolved: July 1, 2013
- Superseding agency: California State Transportation Agency
- Jurisdiction: California
- Agency executive: Secretary
- Website: bth.ca.gov

The California Business, Transportation and Housing Agency (BTH) was a state cabinet-level agency in the government of California. It was superseded by the new California State Transportation Agency on July 1, 2013.

The Business, Transportation and Housing Agency was responsible for oversight of 14 offices and departments and four economic development programs and initiatives within the state government. The Agency's portfolio was one of the largest and most diverse in the State of California. As the lead State Agency for economic development, BT&H strove to maintain and enhance California's leading role in the global economy through the Agency's programs. Its operations addressed a myriad of issues that directly impacted the state's economic vitality and quality of life including transportation, public safety, affordable housing, international trade, financial services, tourism, and managed health care.

From March 2012, the Acting Secretary for Business, Transportation and Housing was Brian P. Kelly. The agency was last headquartered at the Park Tower in Sacramento.

== Organization ==
Effective July 1, 2013, the Business, Transportation, and Housing Agency ceased to exist and became the new California State Transportation Agency (CalSTA) in accordance with the Governor's Reorganization Plan No. 2, while non-transportation departments were moved to the new California Business, Consumer Services and Housing Agency.

=== Former Departments ===
- Department of Alcoholic Beverage Control
- California Department of Transportation
- California Housing Finance Agency
- California Department of Business Oversight
- California Highway Patrol
- Department of Housing and Community Development
- Department of Motor Vehicles
- Department of Real Estate
- Office of Traffic Safety
- Office of Real Estate Appraisers
- Board of Pilot Commissioners

=== Programs & Initiatives ===
- California Film Commission - CFC
- California Office of Tourism
- California Infrastructure and Economic Development Bank - I-BANK
- Small Business Loan Guarantee Program - SBLGP
