= Leon Adams =

American journalist

Leon D. Adams
- Born: February 1, 1905; Boston, Massachusetts, United States
- Died: September 12, 1995 (aged 90); San Francisco, California
- Occupations: Journalist, publicist, historian
- Spouse: Eleanor Adams
- Writing career
- Genre: Wine
- Notable works: Wines of America; Commonsense Book of Wine

Leon David Adams (February 1, 1905 – September 14, 1995) was an American journalist, publicist, historian and co-founder of the Wine Institute. In 1958, Adams book Commonsense Book of Wine was published, which sought to bring table wine into everyday life in the United States. His book Wines of America, published in 1973, is considered the "most thorough work on the subject," specifically regarding the California wine industry.

== Life and work ==
Leon Adams was born in Boston, Massachusetts in 1905. He studied at the University of California, Berkeley, and worked as a journalist for various publications, including McClatchy News Service and the San Francisco Bulletin. Adams advocated for farm winery laws which were passed in many states during the 1970s and 1980s. These laws helped grape growers open wineries and sell their wines through wholesale and retail. He founded the Society of Medical Friends of Wine, which brings together doctors for frequent wine tastings.

He worked in California and lived in Sausalito. He died in San Francisco on September 12, 1995. The New York Times called him "the seminal wine historian in the United States in the 20th century,".
