= C. C. Julian =

Canadian-American oil company promoter (1885–1934)

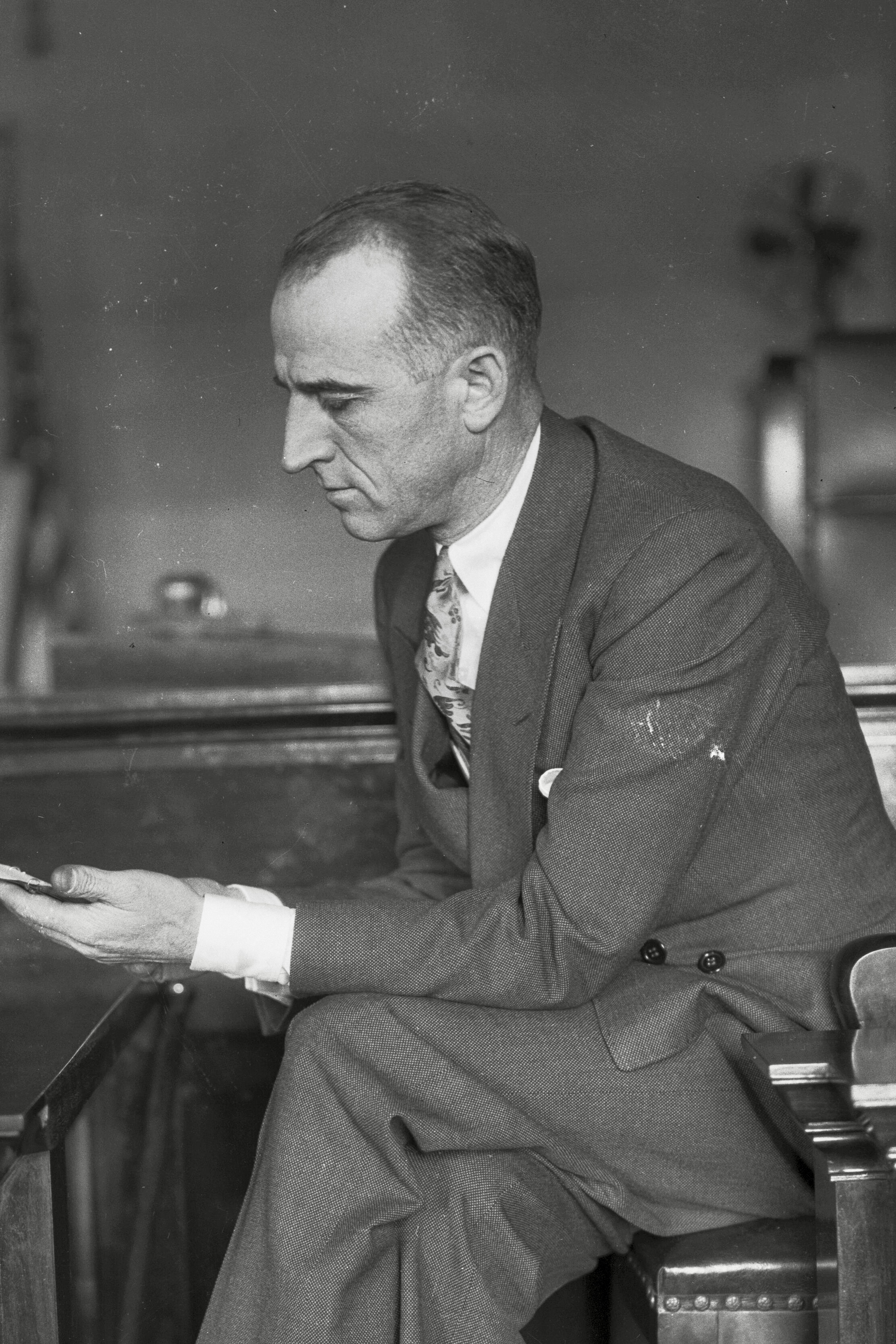
- C. C. Julian in court, Los Angeles, sometime between 1926 and 1933 (L.A. Times Collection at UCLA)
- Born: October 10, 1885; Manitoba, Canada
- Died: March 25, 1934 (aged 48); Shanghai, China
- Burial place: "Shanghai's foreign cemetery"
- Occupation: Oil company promoter

Courtney Chauncey Julian (October 10, 1885 – March 25, 1934) was a Canadian-American oil company promoter and con man operating in Los Angeles, California, United States in the 1920s and 1930s.

== Biography ==
Born in the Canadian province of Manitoba on October 10, 1885, to Roman Catholic Irish immigrant parents, Julian was the founder and namesake of Julian Petroleum Company, which ultimately "defrauded local investors of $100–$200 million (nearly $3 billion in 2019 dollars) with the help of local businessmen and politicians". He had actually struck oil in the beginning but then started making more money in selling stock in the oil company than from any actual petroleum product, so "to continue doling out dividends, and to pay for his four homes and the gold-lined bathtub into which he plunged each morning, he kept issuing more and more stock, turning his original operation into a scheme of the sort recently made famous by Charles Ponzi".

During his period of high spending, Julian reportedly spent $2,300 to buy a round of champagne for all patrons at the Ship Cafe in Venice.

He fled the country to avoid prosecution and committed suicide by intentional drug overdose at the Astor House Hotel in Shanghai, China, on March 25, 1934. At the time of Julian's death his wife and two daughters lived in Winnipeg. He was buried in a "foreign cemetery" in Shanghai on May 11, 1934, in a service attended only by his 19-year-old companion Leonora Levy and her sister.
