= California State Transportation Agency =

California state government agency

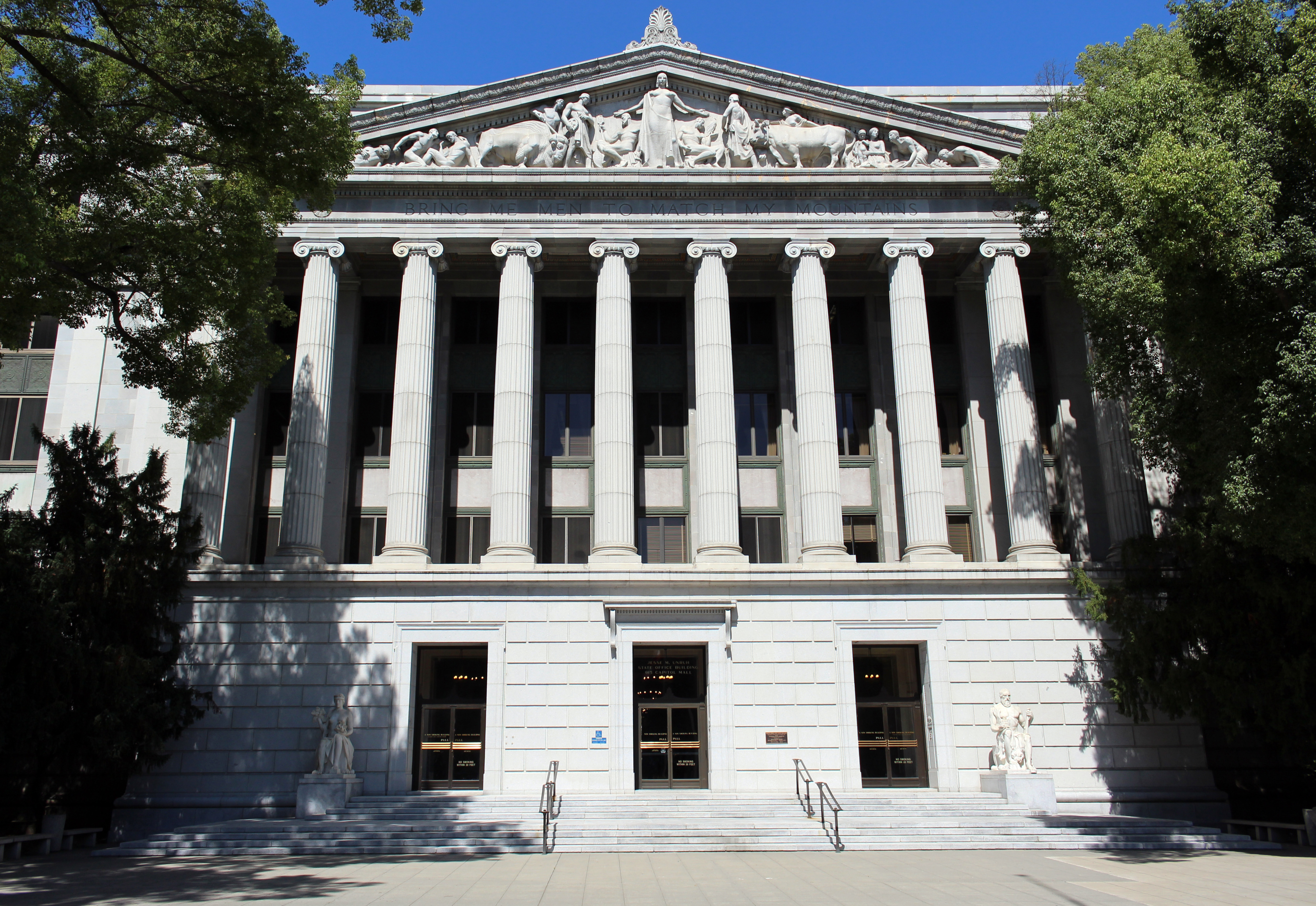
- Agency headquarters at the Jesse M. Unruh State Office Building

Agency overview
- Formed: July 1, 2013; 13 years ago
- Preceding agency: Business, Transportation and Housing Agency
- Jurisdiction: California
- Headquarters: Sacramento, California
- Agency executive: Adetokunbo Omishakin, Secretary
- Website: calsta.ca.gov

The California State Transportation Agency (CalSTA) is a statewide cabinet-level agency within the government of California. The agency is responsible for transportation-related departments within the state. The agency was created under by the California State Legislature during the tenure of governor Jerry Brown in 2013 after the previous Business, Transportation and Housing Agency's portfolio underwent reorganization.

David S. Kim became the third Secretary of CalSTA on July 1, 2019, following his appointment by Governor Gavin Newsom in April 2019. In February 2022, Governor Newsom appointed Toks Omishakin, who at that time was Director of the California Department of Transportation, as the fourth Secretary of CalSTA.

== Organization ==
CalSTA consists of the following transportation-related entities:

- Board of Pilot Commissioners (BOPC)
- California Highway Patrol (CHP)
- California Transportation Commission (CTC)
- Department of Motor Vehicles (DMV)
- California Department of Transportation (Caltrans)
- California High-Speed Rail Authority (CHSRA)
- New Motor Vehicle Board (NMVB)
- Office of Traffic Safety (OTS)
