= Cameron E. Thom =

American politician (1825–1915)

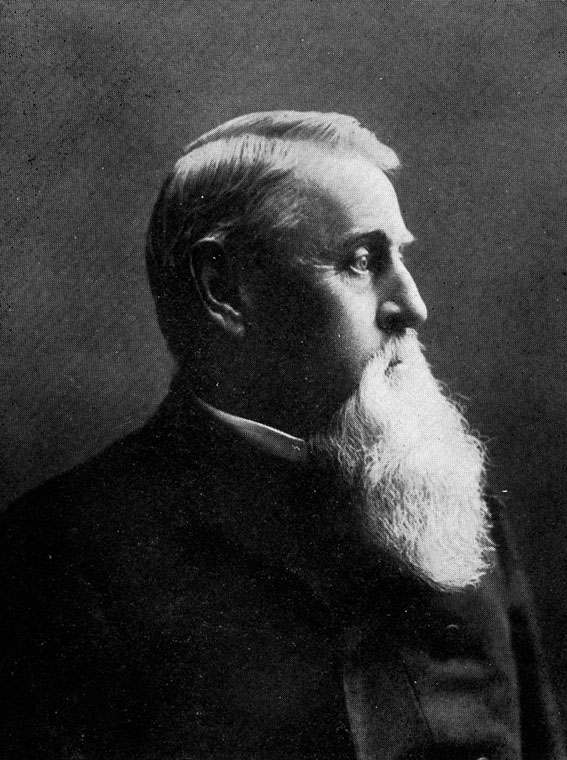
- Portrait of Cameron E. Thom

16th Mayor of Los Angeles
- In office December 9, 1882 – December 9, 1884
- Preceded by: James R. Toberman
- Succeeded by: Edward F. Spence

Personal details
- Born: Cameron Erskine Thom; June 20, 1825 Culpeper County, Virginia, or Richmond, Virginia
- Died: February 2, 1915 (aged 89) Los Angeles, California
- Children: 4

Cameron Erskine Thom (June 20, 1825 – February 2, 1915) was a lawyer, a legislator, a Confederate officer in the Civil War, and the 16th mayor of Los Angeles from 1882 to 1884.

== Personal life ==
Engraving of Thom published 1858

Thom was born in Culpeper County, Virginia, or in Richmond, Virginia, on June 20, 1825, the son of John Thom, who was an officer in the War of 1812 and for 30 years a Virginia state senator. Cameron was educated in private schools in Virginia, and received a law degree from the University of Virginia.

After university, he traveled west in a caravan of some 40 young men and arrived in Sacramento in 1849. He gathered gold on the South Fork of the American River, in Amador County, then settled in Sacramento to open a law office. He served in the Confederate Army during the Civil War. He was wounded at the Battle of Gettysburg and ended the war as a captain.

Thom was married twice: first in 1858 to Susan Henrietta Hathwell; and then, after Susan's death in 1862, to her sister, Belle Cameron Hathwell, in 1874. They married when Belle was only 15 and Thom was 49, she had their first child the same year when he was aged 50. They had four children: Cameron DeHart, Charles Catesby, Belle Buford "Jette" (Mrs. Arthur Collins of London, England) and Erskine Pembroke.

Thom died on February 2, 1915, at age 89. A funeral service in his home at 2070 West Adams Street attracted a "company of several hundred persons," including representatives of the Society of Colonial Wars, of which he was a founder and charter member. Interment was in Evergreen Cemetery, Los Angeles.

== Vocation ==
Thom arrived in California in 1849 during the gold rush, and after a few years of successful mining, he studied law in Sacramento. In fall 1853 he moved to San Francisco, where he was a deputy agent for the United States Land Commission; then moved to Los Angeles, where he had a similar job. He was soon appointed Los Angeles County district attorney, and later won the office in an election. He was also elected Los Angeles city attorney for the 1856–58 term.

In 1859–60 Thom was state senator from California's 1st State Senate district, and was Los Angeles County district attorney from 1854 to 1857, from 1869 to 1873, and from 1877 to 1879. He was mayor of Los Angeles from 1882 to 1884, and was on the Board of Freeholders that framed the first Los Angeles city charter.

== City of Glendale ==
The 1871 land case known as "The Great Partition" divided Rancho San Rafael into 31 sections given to 28 people, including 724 acres (2.93 km^{2}) for Thom. The land belonging to Prudent Beaudry, Alfred Chapman, Andrew Glassell and Thom evolved into Glendale. Thom, Harry J. Crow, B. F. Patterson, B. T. Byram, and Thom's nephew Erskine Mayo Ross were responsible for the creation of the city of Glendale in 1887.

Political offices
Preceded by David B. Kurtz	California's 1st State Senate district 1859–1860	Succeeded by Jonathan J. Warner
Preceded by Benjamin Eaton; Alfred B. Chapman; Rodney Hudson	Los Angeles County District Attorney; 1854–1857; 1869–1873; 1877–1879	Succeeded by Ezra Drown; Volney E. Howard; Thomas B. Brown

Political offices
Preceded by Lewis Granger	Los Angeles City Attorney; 1856–1858	Succeeded by James H. Lader
