= Alfred Chapman =

American politician

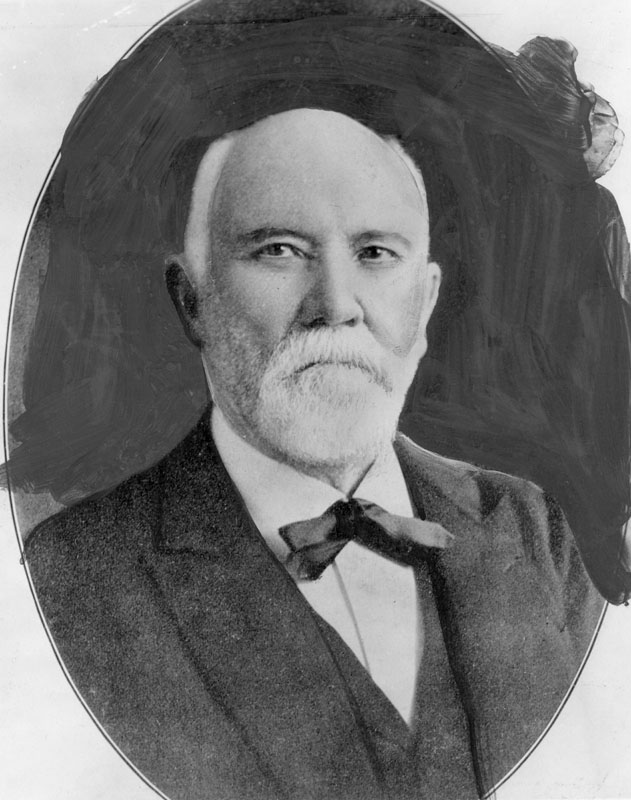
- Undated portrait

Los Angeles City Attorney
- In office 1862–1865
- Preceded by: Myer J. Newmark
- Succeeded by: James H. Lader

Los Angeles County District Attorney
- In office 1867–1869
- Preceded by: Volney E. Howard
- Succeeded by: Cameron E. Thom

Personal details
- Born: September 6, 1829 Greensboro, Alabama, U.S.
- Died: January 16, 1915 (aged 85) San Gabriel Valley, California, U.S.
- Resting place: San Gabriel Cemetery, San Gabriel, California, U.S.

Alfred Beck Chapman (September 6, 1829 – January 16, 1915) was a Los Angeles real estate attorney and investor. He was one of the founders of the city of Orange, California.

== Personal ==
Chapman was born on September 6, 1829, in Greensboro, Alabama. His grandfather, Robert Hett Chapman, was born in Orange, New Jersey, studied theology and was a pastor from 1796 to 1812, at which time he became president of the University of North Carolina at Chapel Hill until 1816. His father attended the University of North Carolina.

== Military ==
Chapman was a Cadet at the Military Academy at West Point, from September 1, 1850, to July 1, 1854, when he was graduated 29th in his class. He was promoted to Brevet Second Lieutenant Of Artillery, July 1, 1854. Serving first in Florida in the early part of the Third Seminole War, 1854-55 during which he was promoted Second Lieutenant, U. S. 3rd Artillery Regiment. On February 15, 1855, he became a Second Lieutenant, U. S. 1st Dragoon Regiment, March 3, 1855, being ordered on frontier duty, at Albuquerque, New Mexico Territory in 1856. There he was on escort duty at both Albuquerque and Camp Moore. At Fort Buchanan, in 1857–1858, he participated in the 1857 Gila Expedition, and engaged Apache, in the Combat on Gila River, N.M., June 27, 1857. While at Fort Buchanan, he also made the first census for the United States of the Pima, Papago and Maricopa peoples of Arizona.

Later in 1858 he was sent to Fort Tejon, California, serving there from 1858 into 1859. There he was involved in the Mohave War scouting against the Mohave people, and was engaged in a skirmish at Beall's Crossing of the Colorado River, January 9, 1859. Three days earlier he had been promoted to First Lieutenant, 1st Dragoons and was then sent to Fort Crook, California, serving there 1859–60, and then at Fort Churchill, in Utah Territory (now Nevada) from later 1860 until he resigned, May 14, 1861, following news of the beginning of the American Civil War. Following his resignation Chapman moved to Los Angeles, in Southern California where he took up the practice of law in 1862.

== Attorney ==
Chapman married Mary Scott, the daughter of Los Angeles attorney Jonathan R. Scott, with whom he studied law. In 1861 he set up a partnership with Cameron E. Thom.

In 1862 Chapman became city attorney of Los Angeles, replacing Myer J. Newmark, who resigned, and in 1868 he was elected district attorney of Los Angeles County. He went into partnership with a boyhood friend, Andrew Glassell, when the latter arrived in Los Angeles in 1866. Colonel George H. Smith, a former Confederate Army officer and brother-in-law of Glassell, joined the firm in 1870. Their law practice was confined chiefly to real estate transactions, and they made their fortunes by handling the large partition suits. Chapman was the businessman of the firm. He took his compensation in land, and nearly every final decree in partition would find that Glassell & Chapman had acquired more property.

Chapman and Glassell are best known in Orange County for being founders of Orange, California. The firm represented the Yorba and Peralta families in the partitioning of Rancho Santiago de Santa Ana in 1867, and had received for a portion of their fees certain large parcels of land in the partition. He joined with one of his partners, Andrew Glassell, to develop a new community, Richland (which would eventually be named Orange). They hired the land surveyor, Frank Lecouvrier of Los Angeles, to map this tract, which they called Richland Farm District. 'Richland' was originally the name of the Virginia plantation owned by the father of Andrew Glassell in the 1830s.

A large transaction by Chapman and Glassell was the legal suit known as "The Great Partition of 1871", brought against the Verdugo Rancho San Rafael properties on the Los Angeles River and in the Verdugo Mountains. The legal fees were again paid in substantial land transfers. He at one time also owned "practically all the land" where Glendale, California, and the suburb of Tropico were established.

Chapman continued to practice law until 1880. After retirement, he devoted full-time to managing his 700-acre (2.8 km^{2}) rancho in the upper San Gabriel Valley, a portion of the Rancho Santa Anita grant, and became involved in citrus production.

== Family and later life ==
Chapman had six children by his first marriage to Mary Scott. He married again after her death in 1883, and had one child by his second marriage to Mary L. Stephens, daughter of a pioneer California attorney and judge.

Chapman died on January 16, 1915, at the age of 85 in his residence near Sunny Slope in the San Gabriel Valley, "the result of heart failure following a severe cold." Survivors were his wife and children A.S. Chapman and Richard H. Chapman of Los Angeles, William Chapman of Spokane, Washington, and Mrs. L.C. Lantz, Mrs. Charles Lantz and Mrs. Evelyn L. Johnson, all of Los Angeles.

== Legacy ==
He is often misidentified as the namesake for Chapman University in Orange, however, businessman and citrus magnate Charles C. Chapman actually has that distinction.

Chapman Avenue, which bisects the heart of Orange, was indeed named to honor attorney Alfred Beck Chapman.

The neighborhood of Chapman Woods in Pasadena, the site of Chapman's rancho in the San Gabriel Valley, is named after Alfred Chapman.

| Preceded by Myer J. Newmark | Los Angeles City Attorney; 1862–65 | Succeeded by James H. Lader |
