= Girl 27 =

- Theatrical release poster
- Directed by: David Stenn
- Written by: David Stenn
- Release date: 2007
- Running time: 86 minutes
- Country: United States
- Language: English

Girl 27 is a 2007 documentary film by writer/director David Stenn about the 1937 rape of dancer and occasional movie extra Patricia Douglas (1917–2003) at a Metro-Goldwyn-Mayer exhibitors' convention, the front-page news stories that followed, and the studio's subsequent cover-up of the crime. Also covered in the film are a similar assault on singer Eloise Spann, following the same party, and her subsequent suicide, as well as the better-known scandal involving actress Loretta Young and her "adopted" daughter Judy Lewis, the product of her date rape by Clark Gable during the production of The Call of the Wild.

Stenn uses first-person interviews and vintage film footage and music to explore the political power of movie studios in 1930s Hollywood, as well as public attitudes toward sexual assault that discouraged victims from coming forward. The filmmaker's dogged pursuit of Douglas, and their resulting friendship, is a consistent theme throughout.

== Production ==
Stenn first came across the story while researching Bombshell, his 1993 biography of Jean Harlow, and spent a decade in pursuit of the facts relating to the Douglas case. That led to his discovery that Douglas was still alive. He located her and persuaded her to tell her story, which he first detailed in a 2003 Vanity Fair article, "It Happened One Night ... at MGM". In an interview at the time of the film's release, Stenn elaborated on the degree of his personal investment in the project:

You name it, I did it wrong. I used my own money, which is the first no-no of all time, I did everything myself, like legal clearances, our crew was tiny, and I just didn't really know what I was doing. It was based on complete inexperience. I broke a cardinal rule by using my own money, but that turned out to be very liberating because I had complete control. But also I was blowing my savings and thinking, "Is anyone ever going to see this?" There was all that stuff, waking up in the middle of the night in a cold sweat, sitting in the car, crying, thinking, "There's just too much here, I don't know if we're going to get it done." But we did.

After its premiere in competition at the Sundance Film Festival, the film was picked up for distribution by Red Envelope Entertainment (Netflix), then Magnolia Pictures. It has also been selected for inclusion in the film collections of the Museum of Modern Art and the Library of Congress, and is available for free streaming at David Stenn's YouTube channel.

== Reception ==
On review aggregator website Rotten Tomatoes, the film holds an approval rating of 86% based on 7 reviews, with an average rating of 7.0/10.

== Renewed attention and re-evaluation ==
The revelations regarding sexual misconduct by certain powerful men in the entertainment industry, that received widespread media coverage beginning in late 2017, brought renewed attention to Girl 27, which earned fresh recognition for the documentary evidence it provided of the perennial existence of the systemic problem. In a New York Times op-ed piece in January 2018, Stenn made the point that, "Injustice can thrive only in silence, and finally the story of Patricia Douglas and others like her now resonates in Hollywood and beyond." Rose McGowan, a prominent figure in the #MeToo movement, commented favorably on Girl 27 on Twitter. And in August 2026, almost 23 years after her death, the New York Times printed a lengthy obituary of Patricia Douglas under the banner of its "Overlooked" feature, devoted to retrospective death notices of remarkable people whose deaths had gone unreported by the paper.
