= Edward J. C. Kewen =

American politician

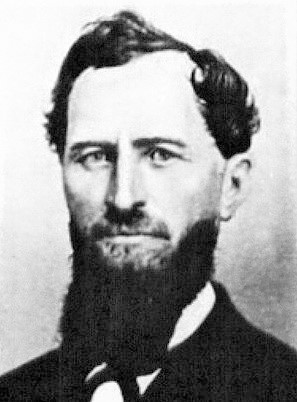

1st Attorney General of California
- In office December 20, 1849 – 1850
- Governor: Peter Hardeman Burnett
- Preceded by: Office established
- Succeeded by: James A. McDougall

Personal details
- Born: November 2, 1825 Columbus, Mississippi, U.S.
- Died: November 26, 1879 (aged 54) Alhambra, California, U.S.

Edward J. C. Kewen (November 2, 1825 – November 26, 1879) was a politician in California and the first Attorney General of California. He was Superintendent of the Los Angeles City schools in 1858 and Los Angeles County District Attorney from 1859 to 1861. He also served in both the Assembly and Senate of the California State Legislature.

Kewen was originally from Columbus, Mississippi, and the son of an Irish immigrant who served in the War of 1812. At the age of thirteen, he matriculated at Wesleyan University in Middletown, Connecticut. He had to return home, however, after his third year of study. Unable to complete his undergraduate education, he became an attorney by reading law in his native Columbus. Subsequently, he relocated to St. Louis, Missouri, for the purpose of practicing law before moving to California.

Kewen died on November 26, 1879, at his home, El Molino Viejo, in San Marino, California. He is an honoree of the Los Angeles County Bar Association's Criminal Justice Wall of Fame (1850–2000): "In Honor of Los Angeles Judges and Lawyers Whose Outstanding Conduct and Professionalism Made Significant Contributions to the Criminal Justice System During Their Lifetimes."

Legal offices
Preceded by None	Attorney General of California; 1849 –1850	Succeeded by James A. McDougall
