= California Office of Tourism =

State agencies of California

The California Office of Tourism, popularly referred to as the Division of Tourism, is a statutory office within the Business, Transportation and Housing Agency. Created by the California Tourism Marketing Act, the office's primary responsibilities are oversight of the California Tourism Selection Committee and the California Travel and Tourism Commission.

The office is directed by the Caroline Beteta who is Deputy Secretary of Tourism of the Business, Transportation and Housing Agency, who also serves as the executive director of the Travel and Tourism Commission.
