= California Department of Motor Vehicles =

State agency in the United States

- Logo

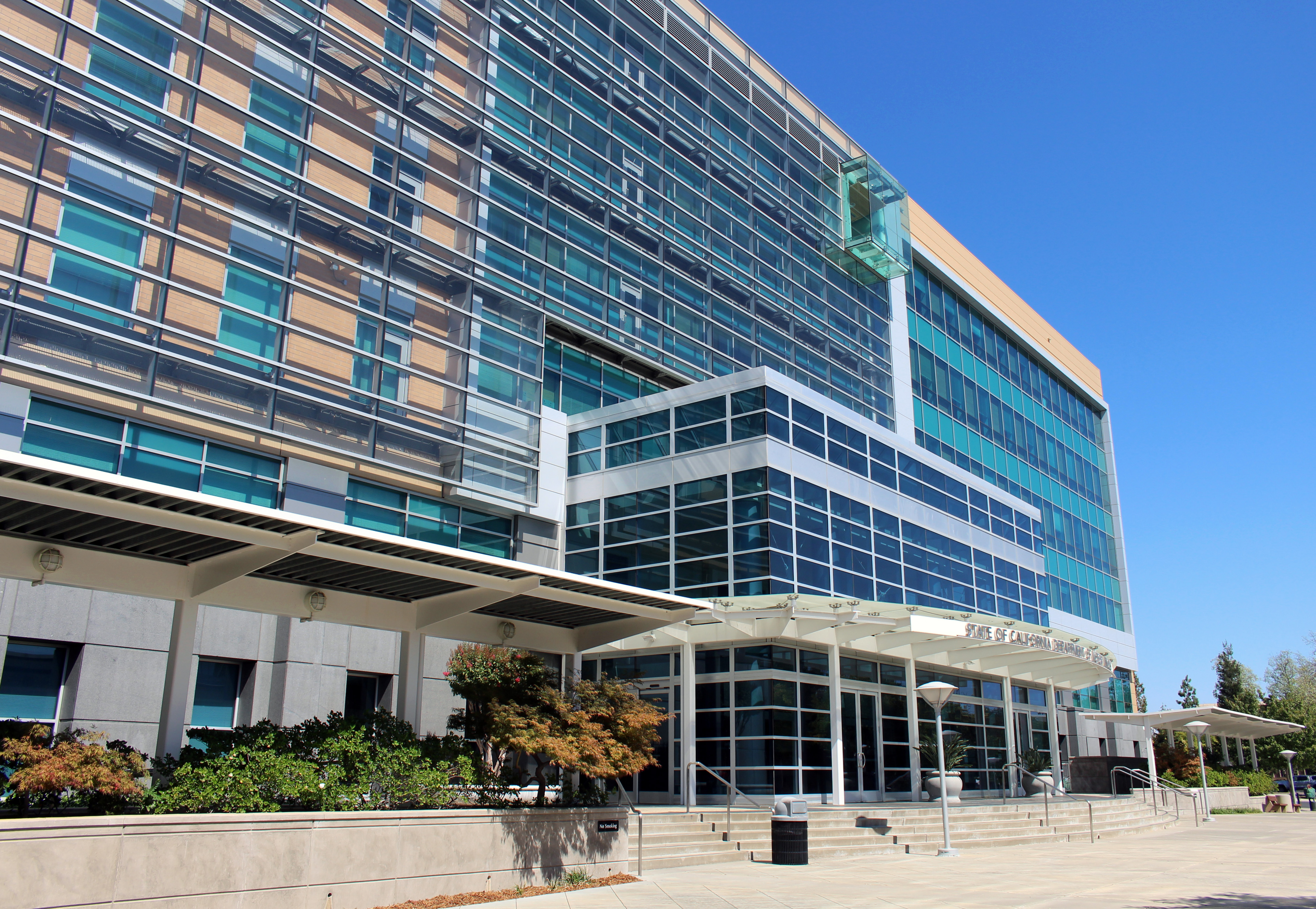
- Headquarters in Sacramento

Agency overview
- Formed: August 7, 1915; 111 years ago
- Preceding agency: Engineering Department
- Jurisdiction: State of California
- Headquarters: DMV Headquarters; 2415 1st Avenue, Sacramento, California 95818; 38°33′26″N 121°28′53″W
- Employees: 8,902
- Annual budget: $1.1 billion
- Agency executive: Steve Gordon, Director
- Parent agency: California State Transportation Agency
- Website: dmv.ca.gov

The California Department of Motor Vehicles (DMV) is the state agency that registers motor vehicles and boats and issues driver licenses in the U.S. state of California. It regulates new car dealers (through the New Motor Vehicle Board), commercial cargo carriers, private driving schools, and private traffic schools. The DMV works with the superior courts of California to promptly record convictions against driver licenses, and initiates administrative proceedings before its own administrative law judges to suspend or revoke licenses when drivers accumulate excessive convictions (as measured by a point-based system). It issues California license plates and driver's licenses. The DMV also issues identification cards to people who request one.

The DMV is part of the California State Transportation Agency. It is headquartered in Sacramento and operates local offices in nearly every part of the state. As of December 2017, the DMV employed over 8,900 people—35% at headquarters and 65% at 172 field offices (and various other locations). Also, as of December 2017, it maintained records for 30,112,927 persons, 33,993,857 driver licenses and/or identification cards (there is overlap as some persons can and do hold both documents), and 35,391,347 vehicles. California has 26,957,875 licensed drivers.

On July 23, 2019, Governor Gavin Newsom released a report by the California Government Operations Agency "DMV Reinvention Strike Team" detailing recommendations for improving DMV transparency, worker training and performance, speed of service, and overall consumer satisfaction. As part of the release of the report, Newsom announced the appointment of Steve Gordon as the director of the California DMV.

== History ==
In 1905, the California State Legislature enacted a law requiring every motor vehicle in California to be registered with the California Secretary of State. In 1907, the 1905 act was amended to authorize the Secretary of State to "appoint a chief clerk and cashier of the motor vehicle department, in the office of the secretary of state, and one other clerk".

A 1913 act repealed the 1905 act and gave the duties of issuing driver's licenses and also issuing "registration blanks" to the Department of Engineering. The department was to issue such blank forms for all automobiles and motorcycles, as well as their "owners, operators, and chauffeurs". The department organized the Motor Vehicle Division to fulfill these duties. Oddly, once filled out, the forms were not to be filed with the department, but with the California State Treasurer.

The Vehicle Act of 1915 repealed all prior acts and created the Motor Vehicle Department of California to assume the duties of issuing driver's licenses and registering all motor vehicles. The new department was to be headed by a superintendent, who would be appointed by and would hold office at the pleasure of the governor.

A 1917 law authorized the superintendent to appoint "field deputies" or "inspectors" to enforce the Vehicle Act, who would have the powers vested by law in peace officers. This law was later revised to clarify that these employees would be titled "traffic officers" and "inspectors".

In 1921, the Legislature created the California Department of Finance and transferred the powers and duties of the Motor Vehicle Department of California to a new Division of Motor Vehicles within the new department. In 1929, the division was transferred to the California Department of Public Works.

In 1929, the Legislature enacted a law collectively designating the already-existing traffic officers and their superiors (such as inspectors and captains) as the California Highway Patrol.

The DMV assumed its modern and current form in 1931. The Legislature enacted a law establishing the California Department of Motor Vehicles, and providing that it would be supervised by a director who was to be appointed by and would hold office at the pleasure of the governor.

Initially, the department had two divisions: the Division of Registration and the Division of Enforcement (also known as the California Highway Patrol). In December 1931, the governor approved a reorganization plan presented by the director, which added a Division of Accounting and a Legal Division. In August 1933, the Legal Division was abolished and a Division of Drivers' Licenses and Adjustments was created. At that time, the work of the Legal Division was transferred by the Legislature to the Attorney General. The words "and Adjustments" were dropped from the name of the Division of Drivers' Licenses and Adjustments in March 1936.

Today, the DMV maintains a cadre of approximately 200 armed sworn state law enforcement officers classified criminal investigators for enforcement duties relating to vessel or motor vehicle theft, vehicle or hull identification number and odometer fraud, chop shops, counterfeit or fraudulent DMV documents, disabled parking permit placard misuse, identity theft, unlicensed vehicle dealer ("curbstoner") and dismantler activity, out-of-state vehicle registration plate misuse to avoid California registration, internal employee investigations, etc.

The DMV began collecting a statewide Vehicle License Fee in 1936, in lieu of the personal property tax that individual cities and counties previously levied directly on motor vehicles regularly garaged within their borders (hence its nickname as the "in lieu tax").

The nation's first modern "credit card style" driver's licenses were introduced by the California DMV in January 1991. The plastic-coated design featured innovations like digitized photos, color holograms, and magnetic information strips readable by law enforcement.

In 2012, a bill introduced by California State Assemblyman Mike Gatto required the DMV to establish the California Legacy License Plate Program. This program allows California residents to order replicas of California license plates produced in the 1950s, 1960s, and 1970s. The original intent was for older cars to get new plates that matched the plate colors that the DMV issued for that car when it was new. Due to lack of applications, the program was opened to all cars. For a license plate style to enter production, it needed to receive 7,500 paid applications by the January 1, 2015, deadline. Only the 1960s style plate (yellow lettering on black background) received the required number of orders. The DMV began production of the 1960s style plates at Folsom State Prison in Summer 2015.

Since 2015, more than a million Undocumented immigrants have been issued driver's licenses.

== Driver handbook ==
The California Driver Handbook is a booklet published by the California Department of Motor Vehicles. It is also available on the web. Formerly titled the 'Vehicle Code Summary', it has information relating to licenses, examinations, laws/rules of the road, road signs, seat belts, and health and safety issues. There are also several pages of advertisements. The 2021 version had 116 pages.

== Autonomous vehicles ==
California provides permits for testing and deploying autonomous vehicles on public roads. The first manufacturer licensed to deploy autonomous cars without a safety driver by the California DMV was Nuro, on December 23, 2020. Two more manufacturers, Cruise and Waymo, were licensed on September 30, 2021.

== See also ==
- Department of motor vehicles
- Government of California
- Driver's licenses in the United States
