= California Department of Financial Protection and Innovation =

California state department

Department of Financial Protection and Innovation
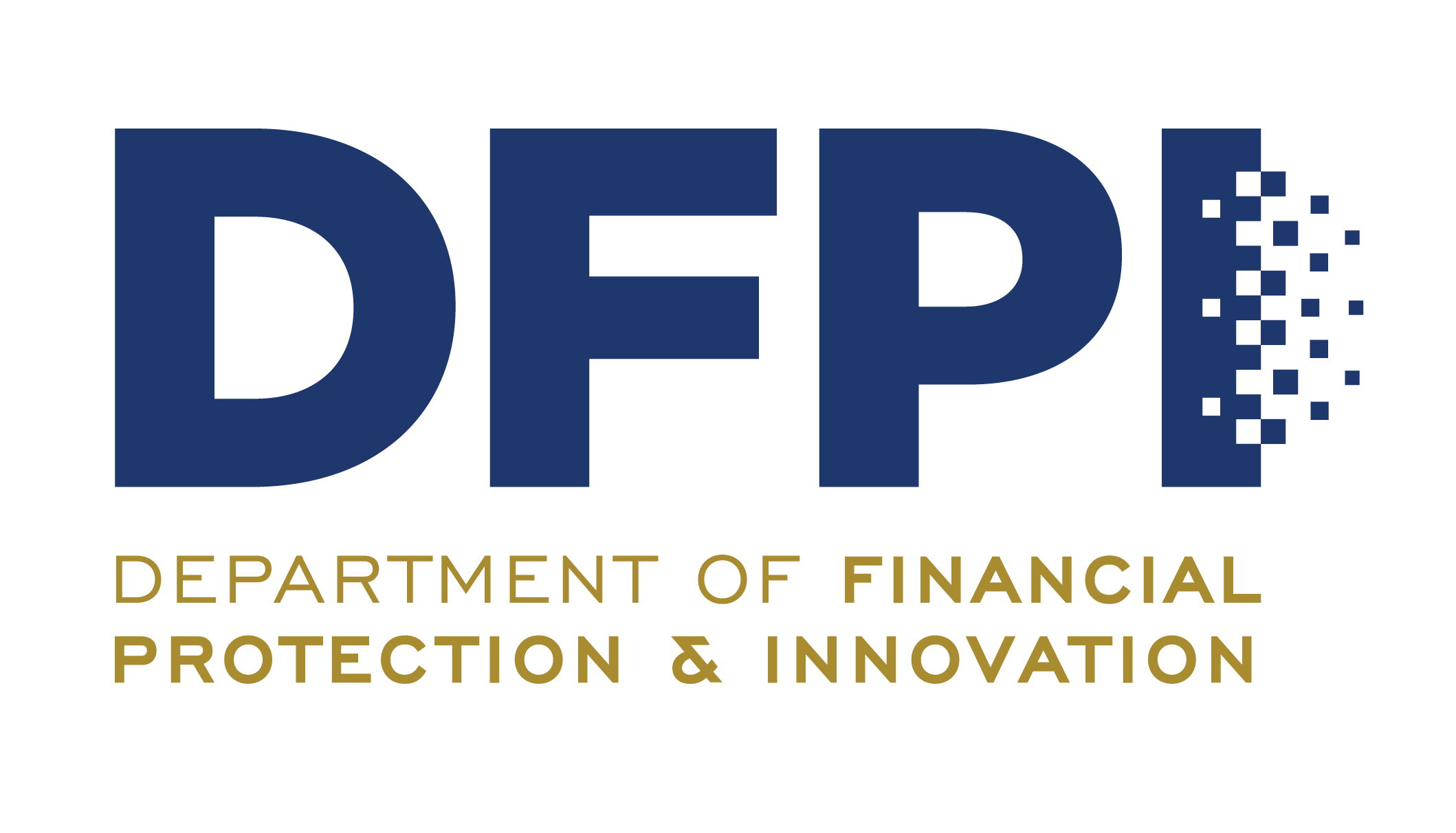

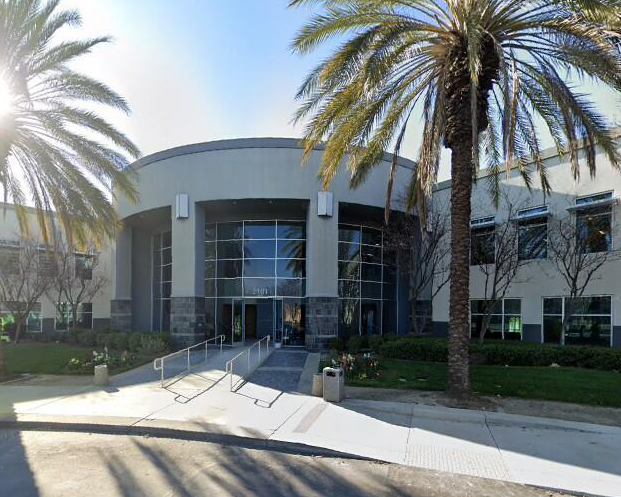
- DFPI headquarters in Sacramento, CA

Department overview
- Formed: July 1, 2013
- Preceding agencies: Department of Financial Institutions; Department of Corporations; Department of Business Oversight
- Jurisdiction: California
- Headquarters: 2101 Arena Boulevard Sacramento, California; 38.6471°N 121.5125°W
- Department executive: KC Mohseni, Commissioner
- Parent department: Business, Consumer Services and Housing Agency
- Website: dfpi.ca.gov

The California Department of Financial Protection and Innovation (abbreviated DFPI; formerly the Department of Business Oversight, DBO) regulates a variety of financial services, businesses, products, and professionals. The DFPI does not regulate the Better Business Bureau. The department operates under the California Business, Consumer Services and Housing Agency.

The DFPI protects California consumers and oversees the operations of state-licensed financial institutions, including banks, credit unions, debt collectors, nonbank mortgage lenders, student loan servicers, money transmitters, and others. Additionally, the department licenses and regulates a variety of financial businesses, including securities brokers and dealers, investment advisers, payday lenders, certain fiduciaries, and nonbank lenders. The department also regulates the offer and sale of securities, franchises, and off-exchange commodities.

As of February 7, 2025, Commissioner KC Mohseni leads the department, which has offices in Sacramento, San Francisco, Los Angeles, and San Diego.

== History ==
The Department of Financial Protection and Innovation has a long history, dating back to the formation of California's first banking department. It became the DFPI in 2020 with the passage of the California Consumer Financial Protection Law (CCFPL).

Formation of State Banking Department (1909) and State Corporations Department (1913)

In 1909, California passed the Bank Act, creating the State Banking Department. By doing this, California looked to protect depositors and ensure responsible regulation within the banking system. In 1913, the California Legislature enacted the Investment Companies Act, which created the State Corporations Department. The new department was led by a Commissioner of Corporations who released annual reports about the state of the department.

Department of Financial Institutions (1997)

The Department of Financial Institutions (DFI) became operative on July 1, 1997, and worked to reduce unnecessary regulations and costs for state-chartered banks, credit unions, trust companies, and other licensees formerly regulated by the State Banking Department. The DFI also focused on further regulatory reforms and helped create an environment of innovation within financial institutions.

Department of Business Oversight (2013)

Effective July 1, 2013, the Department of Corporations (DOC) and the Department of Financial Institutions (DFI) merged to form the Department of Business Oversight (DBO), which reported to a newly formed Business, Consumer Services and Housing Agency. This change was part of Governor Jerry Brown's plan to increase the efficiency and cost-effectiveness of state government.

The former DOC and DFI continued to operate as separate divisions within the DBO, enabling the core missions of both departments to continue. All applications, examinations, and reports continued to be processed by the attorneys and staff who worked for the former departments.

Department of Financial Protection and Innovation (2020)

In an effort to strengthen consumer financial protections in California, Governor Gavin Newsom in 2020 proposed an initiative to modernize and revamp the Department of Business Oversight (DBO). The measure included an increase in staff and authority, to enhance the department's regulatory scope and enable it to become a national model for consumer protection.

Effective September 29, 2020, the DBO changed its name to the Department of Financial Protection and Innovation.

- The California Consumer Financial Protection Law

The California Consumer Financial Protection Law (CCFPL) gave the DFPI expanded enforcement powers to protect California consumers from unfair, deceptive, or abusive practices committed by unlicensed financial services or products; COVID-19 pandemic-inspired scams; and a regulatory retreat by some federal agencies, most notably the Consumer Financial Protection Bureau (CFPB). Modeled after the CFPB, the new law also was designed to promote innovation, clarify regulatory hurdles for emerging products, and increase education and outreach for vulnerable groups.

Two pieces of legislation, AB 1864 and AB107, were passed on August 31, 2020. The bills advanced the CCFPL and signaled the start of the DFPI's transition and name change. The CCFPL went into full effect on January 1, 2021.

- Division of Consumer Financial Protection and Office of Financial Technology Innovation

Governor Newsom's initiative also created the Division of Consumer Financial Protection and the Office of Financial Technology Innovation within the DFPI. The Division of Consumer Financial Protection is responsible for supervising those financial services not previously regulated by the department. The Office of Financial Technology Innovation is responsible for engaging with new industries and consumer advocates to encourage responsible innovation and job creation in California.

== Department divisions and units ==
Division of Consumer Financial Protection

The Division of Consumer Financial Protection is responsible for supervising and regulating financial activities not previously overseen by the department. These include debt collection, debt relief, private post-secondary education finance, and newly emerging financial products or services.

Division of Corporations and Financial Institutions

With the passage of the CCFLP, the Division of Corporations and Division of Financial Institutions were merged into a single division, the Division of Corporations and Financial Institutions, in 2020.

The Division of Corporations and Financial Institutions licenses and regulates broker-dealer and investment advisers; financial service providers like payday lenders, finance lenders and brokers, and escrow companies; residential mortgage lenders and loan originators; commercial, industrial, and foreign (other nation and other state) banks; state-chartered credit unions; and money transmitters.

Enforcement Division

The Enforcement Division enforces the laws administered by the DFPI.

Legal Division

The Legal Division serves as in-house legal counsel for all of the department's programs and also regulates the offer and sale of securities and franchises.

Consumer Services

The Consumer Services Office is the main point of contact for Californians filing a complaint with the department or requesting additional information about licensees. Offering a live-person call center, the team logs thousands of calls a year and works with licensees to help consumers settle disputes and resolve issues. It offers translation services in dozens of languages and flags complaints that require investigation to the department's enforcement division.

Communications and Outreach

The Communications office offers strategic messaging, media relations, and digital communications support. Working to reach all Californians, the Communications team helps draft and edit external communications, including consumer alerts, emergency proclamations, website content, social media campaigns, presentations, media releases, educational resources, and more. The team helps coordinates events, statewide communications campaigns and works with internal and external stakeholders to help tell the story of the department's work and our impact as a national model for consumer protection and financial regulation.

The DFPI outreach team works directly with stakeholders and community groups across California to educate consumers about the department's oversight, disseminate financial resources, and partner with community groups and local representatives on financial education opportunities. The team develops resources, conducts educational presentations, including on timely or current financial fraud and scams, and helps connect consumers to our consumer services office when needed. They manage the CalMoneySmart grant program, which awards California nonprofits with up to $100,000 in funding to execute financial literacy programs.

Legislation

The Legislative team monitors and tracks bills related to the DFPI, and provides guidance on legislative issues.

== Department of Consumer Affairs ==
While the Department of Financial Protection and Innovation regulates a variety of financial services, products, and professionals, the California Department of Consumer Affairs (DCA) licenses or certifies more than 2.4 million practitioners across more than 255 professions (those outside DFPI jurisdiction). Both the DFPI and DCA seek to promote informed consumer practices and publish a variety of publications on consumer-related issues.
