= David Stenn =

American screenwriter

David Stenn is an American television writer-producer, biographer, and film preservationist. His television credits range from Hill Street Blues to Boardwalk Empire. He is known for his biographies of Hollywood stars Clara Bow and Jean Harlow.

== Early life and television career ==
Stenn was born in Chicago, Illinois and graduated magna cum laude with a bachelor of arts degree from Yale University. His television career began one year later, when he became the youngest writer of the NBC series Hill Street Blues. He subsequently served as a writer and story editor for the anthology series Alfred Hitchcock Presents (1985–86). His teleplay for the made-for-TV movie She Was Marked for Murder (1988) earned him an Edgar Award nomination from the Mystery Writers of America. Stenn also wrote the Universal feature film Cool as Ice (1991).

Subsequent television series credits include the Fox Network's 21 Jump Street (writer-producer) and Beverly Hills 90210 (writer-supervising producer and creator of the character Dylan McKay, portrayed by Luke Perry); the NBC miniseries The Secrets of Lake Success (writer-executive producer); the CBS series Central Park West (writer-co-executive producer); Showtime's The L Word (writer-co-executive producer), and the HBO period gangster drama Boardwalk Empire (writer-supervising producer, consultant).

== Books ==
Concurrently with his early television career, Stenn wrote the biographies Clara Bow: Runnin’ Wild (1988) and Bombshell: The Life and Death of Jean Harlow (1993), both edited by Jacqueline Onassis at Doubleday. Widely praised for their sensitivity and depth of research, both books are considered definitive works on their subjects: Bombshell was named a New York Times "Notable Book" of the year, and Clara Bow: Runnin’ Wild, a best-seller, remains in print today and is considered among the most durable titles of Onassis's two-decade editorial career.

== Patricia Douglas and Girl 27 ==
While researching Bombshell, Stenn stumbled across a reference to a long-buried Hollywood scandal about an underage dancer whose career and life were derailed after she was brutally raped by an MGM sales representative at an exhibitors' convention in 1937, then stigmatized by the studio's aggressive cover-up of the crime. His pursuit of this story turned into a decade-long research project, one notable result of which was his astonishing discovery that the victim, Patricia Douglas, was still alive. He located her and persuaded her to tell her story, which he first detailed in a 2003 article for Vanity Fair. Stenn subsequently produced a documentary film on the subject, Girl 27 (2007), which incorporated footage of both the M-G-M exhibitors’ convention and of Douglas herself, who had agreed to appear on-camera for the first time shortly before her death. The film was picked up for distribution by Red Envelope Entertainment (Netflix), then Magnolia Pictures after its premiere in competition at the Sundance Film Festival.

The revelations regarding sexual misconduct by certain powerful men in the entertainment industry that received widespread media coverage beginning in late 2017 brought renewed attention to Girl 27, in recognition of its documentary evidence of the perennial existence of this systemic problem. In a New York Times op-ed piece in January 2018, Stenn made the point that "Injustice can thrive only in silence, and finally the story of Patricia Douglas and others like her now resonates in Hollywood and beyond." In further testimony to the film's contemporary relevance, in August 2026, almost 23 years after her death, the New York Times printed a lengthy obituary of Patricia Douglas under the banner of its "Overlooked" feature, devoted to retrospective death notices of remarkable people whose deaths had gone unreported by the paper.

== Film preservation ==
Stenn is a passionate and generous supporter of film preservation, an activity that grew out of his discovery, while researching his Clara Bow biography, that more than two-thirds of her silent films were believed to either no longer exist, or to survive only on unstable nitrate film stock. His search for Bow's lost or endangered films has resulted in the location and/or preservation of at least twenty-five titles, with Stenn personally funding the restoration of four Bow features: Parisian Love (1925), Mantrap (1926) and The Saturday Night Kid (1929) at the UCLA Film and Television Archive; and Capital Punishment (1925) at the Library of Congress. Stenn has also been active in tracking down other films previously thought to have been lost, including at least one dozen short films featuring silent screen child star Baby Peggy; the feature The Letter (1929), starring theatrical legend Jeanne Eagels; and most recently, the original twelve-reel version of director James Whale's The Road Back (1937), which had been cut by almost thirty minutes after its original release at the behest of Nazi Germany. Preserved by the Library of Congress with funds from Martin Scorsese's Film Foundation, this restored version of The Road Back premiered at the Berlinale (Berlin International Film Festival) in February 2016. Stenn also has served since 2009 on the Board of the Film Department at the Museum of Modern Art (MoMA) in New York and is also a member of the Board of Advisors of the UCLA Film and Television Archive.
