= Los Angeles County District Attorney =

District Attorney of Los Angeles

District Attorney of Los Angeles County
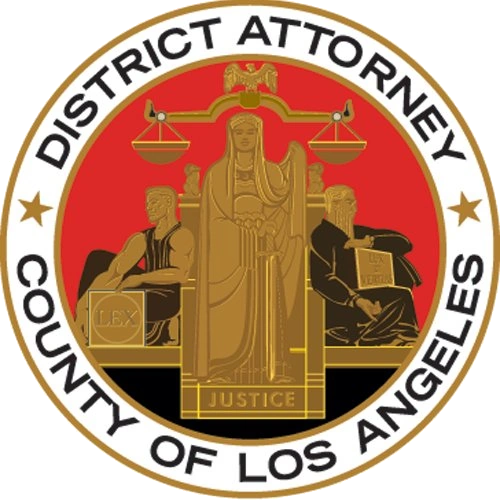
- Seal

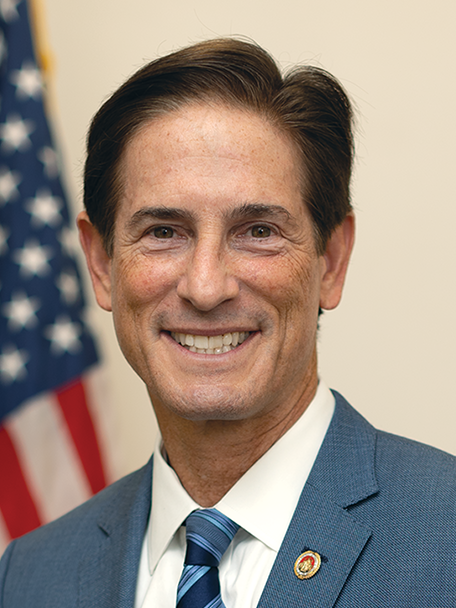
- Incumbent; Nathan Hochman since December 3, 2024
- Seat: The Hall of Justice; 211 West Temple Street; Los Angeles, California
- Term length: Four years
- Constituting instrument: Charter of the County of Los Angeles
- Formation: 1852
- First holder: William C. Ferrell
- Salary: $346,414 (2020)
- Website: da.lacounty.gov

The District Attorney of Los Angeles County is in charge of the office that prosecutes felony and misdemeanor crimes that occur within Los Angeles County, California, United States. The current district attorney (DA) is Nathan Hochman.

Some misdemeanor crimes are prosecuted by local city attorneys. City attorneys prosecute misdemeanors and infractions that are violations of the municipal code governing incorporated cities, such as Los Angeles and Long Beach, within the county. All other felony and misdemeanors within Los Angeles County are prosecuted by the district attorney's office. According to the district attorney's official website, the office is the largest local prosecutor's office in the United States. The Los Angeles County Public Defender provides legal assistance to individuals charged with a crime who are financially unable to hire and pay for their own private lawyers.

The Los Angeles County District Attorney's Office is the largest local prosecutorial office in the United States.

== List of district attorneys ==
Num.	Name	Term
01.	William C. Ferrell	1850–1851
02.	Isaac K. Ogier	1851–1852
03.	Kimball H. Dimmick	1852–1853
04.	Benjamin Eaton	1853–1854
05.	Cameron E. Thom	1854–1857
06.	Ezra Drown	1857–1859
07.	Edward J. C. Kewen	1859–1861
08.	Ezra Drown	1861–1863
09.	Alfred B. Chapman	1863–1864
10.	Volney E. Howard	1864–1867
11.	Alfred B. Chapman	1867–1869
12.	Cameron E. Thom	1869–1873
13.	Volney E. Howard	1873–1876
14.	Rodney Hudson	1876–1877
15.	Cameron E. Thom	1877–1879
16.	Thomas B. Brown	1879–1882
17.	Stephen M. White	1882–1884
18.	George M. Holton	1884–1886
19.	George S. Patton	1886–1887
20.	J. R. Dupuy	1887–1888
21.	Frank P. Kelly	1888–1890
22.	James McLachlan	1890–1892
23.	Henry C. Dillon	1892–1894
24.	John C. Donnell	1895–1899
25.	James C. Rives	1899–1903
26.	John Donnan Fredericks	1903–1915
27.	Thomas L. Woolwine	1915–1923
28.	Asa Keyes	1923–1928
29.	Buron Fitts	1928–1940
30.	John F. Dockweiler	1940–1943
31.	Frederick N. Howser	1943–1946
32.	William E. Simpson	1946–1951
33.	S. Ernest Roll	1951–1956
34.	William B. McKesson	1956–1964
35.	Evelle J. Younger	1964–1971
36.	Joseph P. Busch	1971–1975
37.	John Van de Kamp	1975–1981
38.	Robert Philibosian	1981–1984
39.	Ira Reiner	1984–1992
40.	Gil Garcetti	1992–2000
41.	Steve Cooley	2000–2012
42.	Jackie Lacey	2012–2020
43.	George Gascón	2020–2024
44.	Nathan Hochman	2024–present

== See also ==
- San Diego County District Attorney
- San Francisco District Attorney's Office
