= Makoto Hagiwara =

Japanese-American landscape designer

Makoto Hagiwara (萩原 眞, Hagiwara Makoto) (15 August 1854 – 12 September 1925) was a Japanese-born American landscape designer responsible for the maintenance and expansion of the Japanese Tea Garden at Golden Gate Park in San Francisco, California, from 1895 until his death in 1925. Hagiwara is often credited with the invention of the fortune cookie in California.

== Biography ==
Hagiwara was born on 15 August 1854 in a village in northern Kai Province (located in present-day Yamanashi, Yamanashi Prefecture) into a peasant family. His father died when he was 15 years-old and ran the family farm until he emigrated to the United States in 1878. He opened the first Japanese restaurant in San Francisco, and records show that he was the owner of a restaurant called Yamatoya in Chinatown. Hagiwara opened another restaurant in nearby Oakland but this venture failed.

After the close of San Francisco's 1894 World's Fair, Hagiwara was then hired to manage the fair's tea garden site. He personally oversaw the modification of the temporary Japanese Village fair exhibit to the permanent Japanese Tea Garden and was official caretaker of the garden for most of the time between 1895 and his death in 1925. It was there that he is said to have introduced the modern version of the fortune cookie, which he is believed to have adapted from Japan's tsujiura senbei (辻占煎餅).
