= Japanese Tea Garden =

Japanese Tea Garden may refer to:

- Japanese Tea Garden (San Francisco), a feature of Golden Gate Park, California
- Fort Worth Japanese Garden, a Japanese garden in the Fort Worth Botanic Garden, Texas
- Portland Japanese Garden, a traditional Japanese garden in Portland, Oregon
- San Antonio Japanese Tea Garden, a garden in Brackenridge Park, San Antonio, Texas
- Seattle Japanese Garden, a Japanese garden in the Madison Park neighborhood of Seattle, Washington

== See also ==
- Japanese garden, a traditional, often highly stylized, garden
- Japanese tea ceremony, a Japanese cultural activity involving the ceremonial preparation of green tea
- Chashitsu, architectural spaces designed to be used for tea ceremony
- Roji, the Japanese term for the garden through which one passes to the chashitsu
- Tea garden (disambiguation)
