= Fortune cookie =

Cookie with printed paper fortune inside

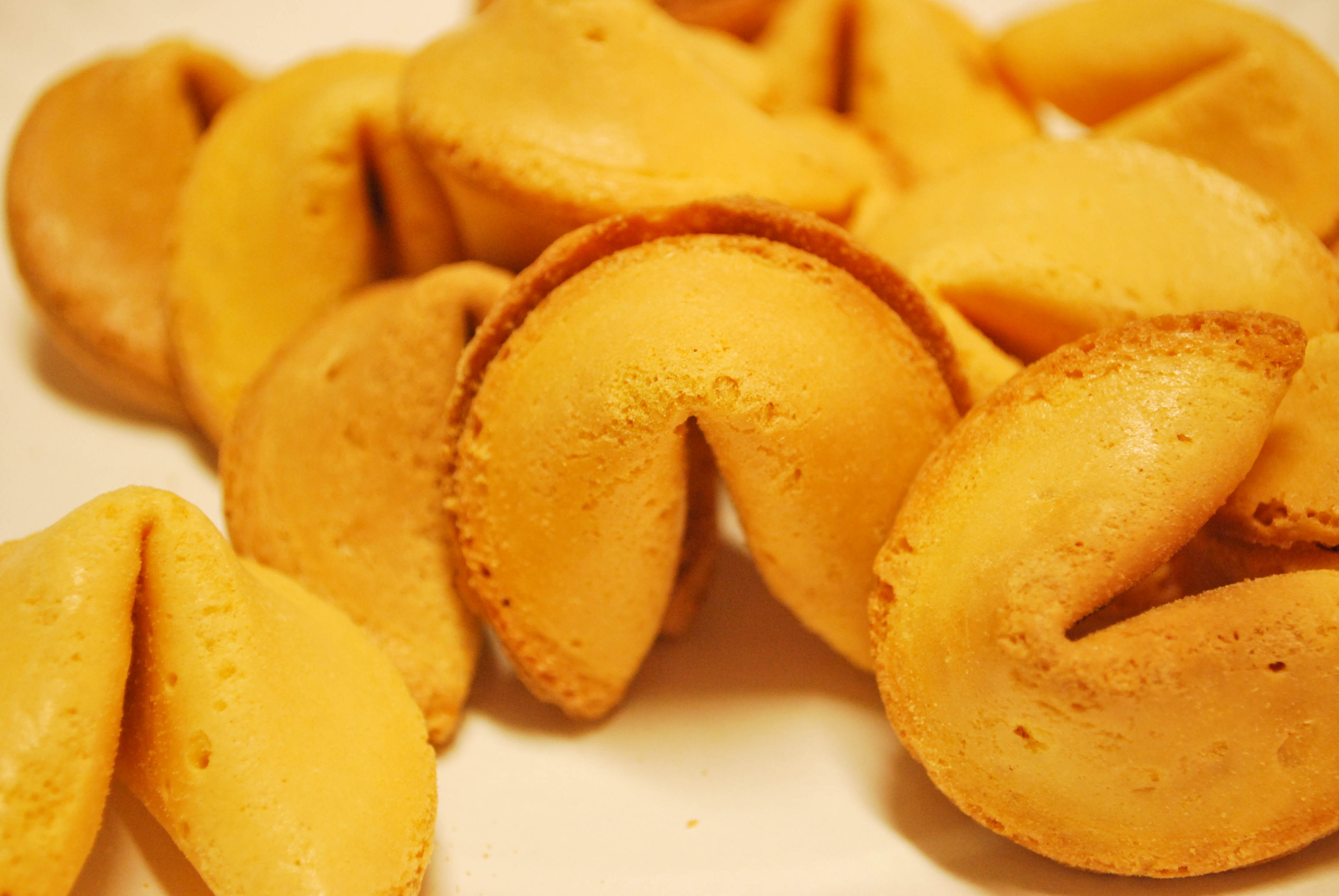
- Unopened fortune cookies
- Type: Cookie (wafer)
- Course: Dessert
- Place of origin: Japan; United States; China
- Main ingredients: Flour, sugar, vanilla, and oil

A fortune cookie is a crisp and sugary cookie wafer made from flour, sugar, vanilla, and sesame seed oil with a piece of paper inside, a "fortune", an aphorism, or a vague prophecy. The message inside may also include a Chinese phrase with translation or a list of lucky numbers used by some as lottery numbers. Fortune cookies are often served as a dessert in Chinese restaurants in the United States, Canada, Australia, and other countries, but they are not Chinese in origin. The exact origin of fortune cookies is unclear, though various immigrant groups in California claim to have popularized them in the early 20th century. They most likely originated from cookies made by Japanese immigrants to the United States in the late 19th or early 20th century. The Japanese version did not have the Chinese lucky numbers and were eaten with tea.

== Etymology ==
There is no single accepted Chinese name for the cookies, with a large variety of translations being used to describe them in the Chinese, all of which being more-or-less literal translations of the English "fortune cookie". Examples include: 幸运籤饼 xìngyùn qiān bǐng "good luck lot cookie", 籤语饼 qiān yǔ bǐng "fortune words cookie", 幸运饼 xìngyùn bǐng "good luck cookie", 幸运籤语饼 xìngyùn qiān yǔ bǐng "lucky fortune words cookie", 幸运甜饼 xìngyùn tián bǐng "good luck sweet cookie", 幸福饼干 xìngfú bǐnggān "good luck biscuit", or 占卜饼 zhānbǔ bǐng "divining cookie".

== History ==
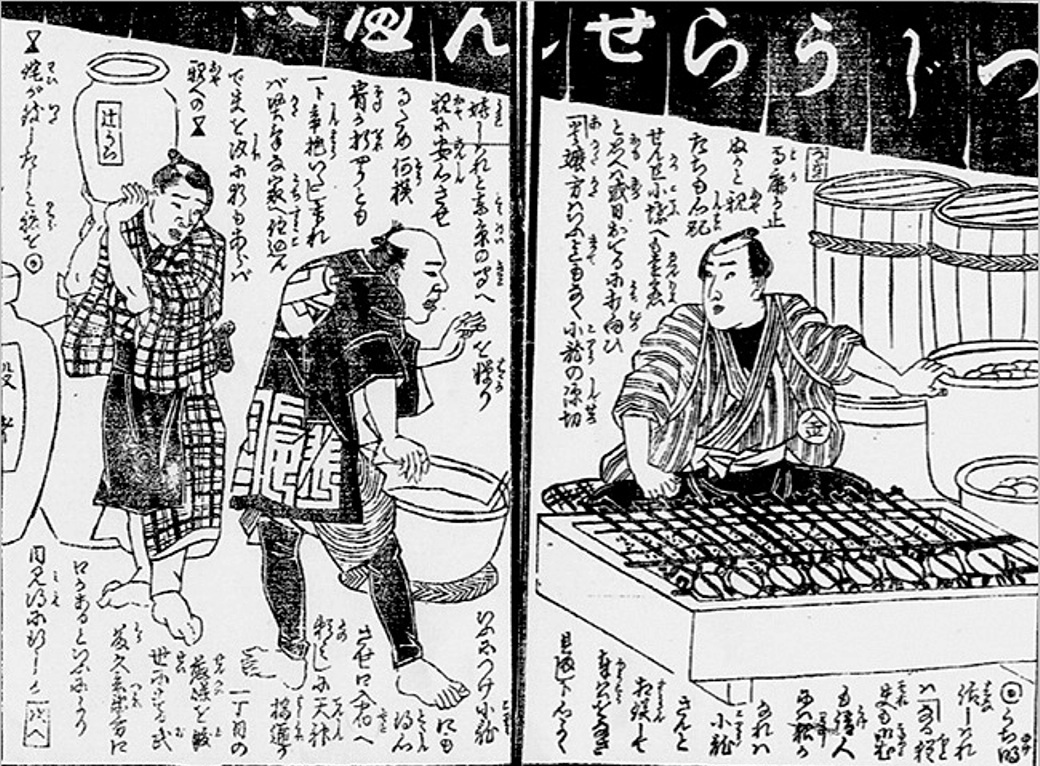
Baking Tsujiura Senbei, or Japanese fortune cookies, in the Edo period (1603–1868), from a book written in 1878

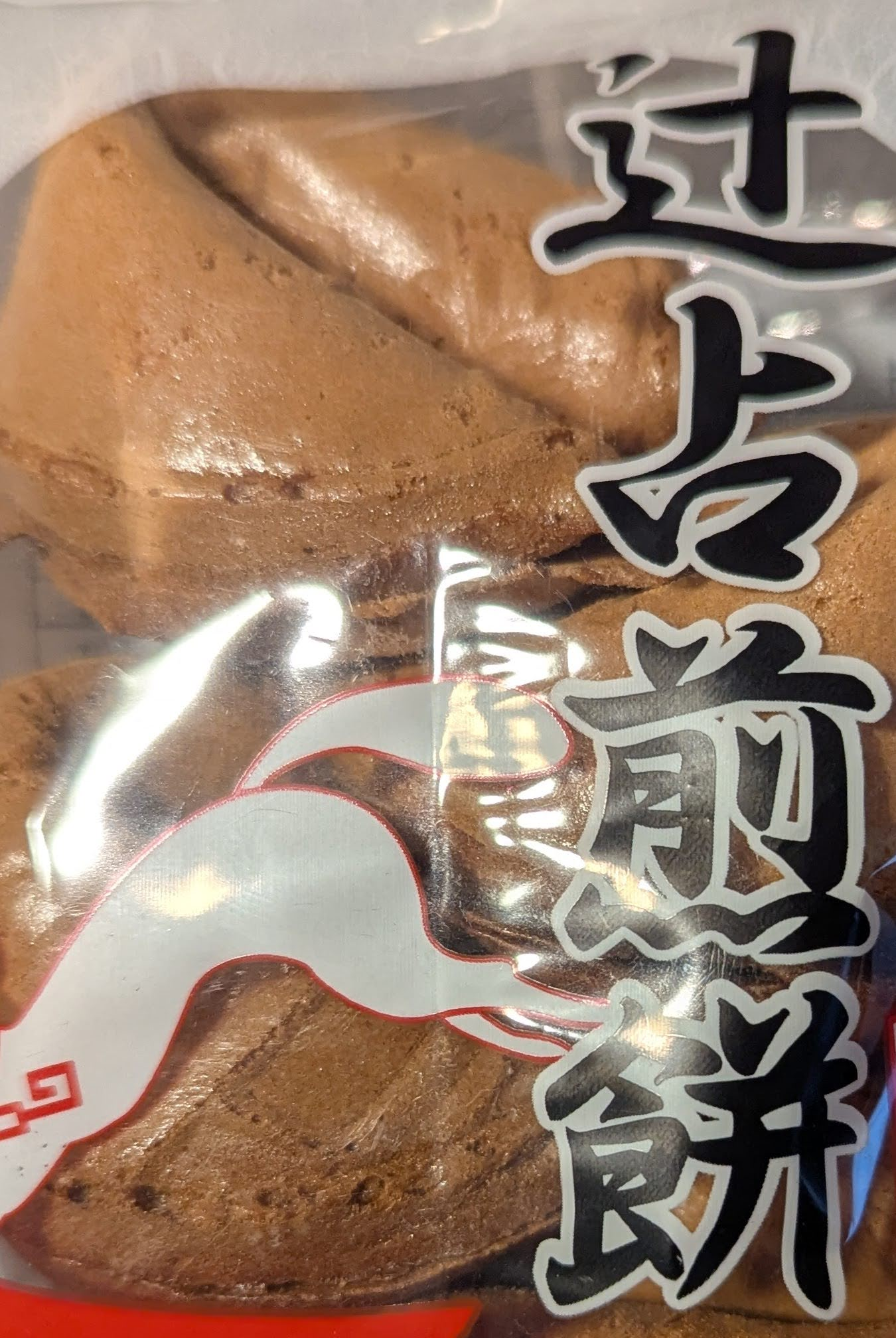
Package of tsujiura senbei (辻占煎餅)

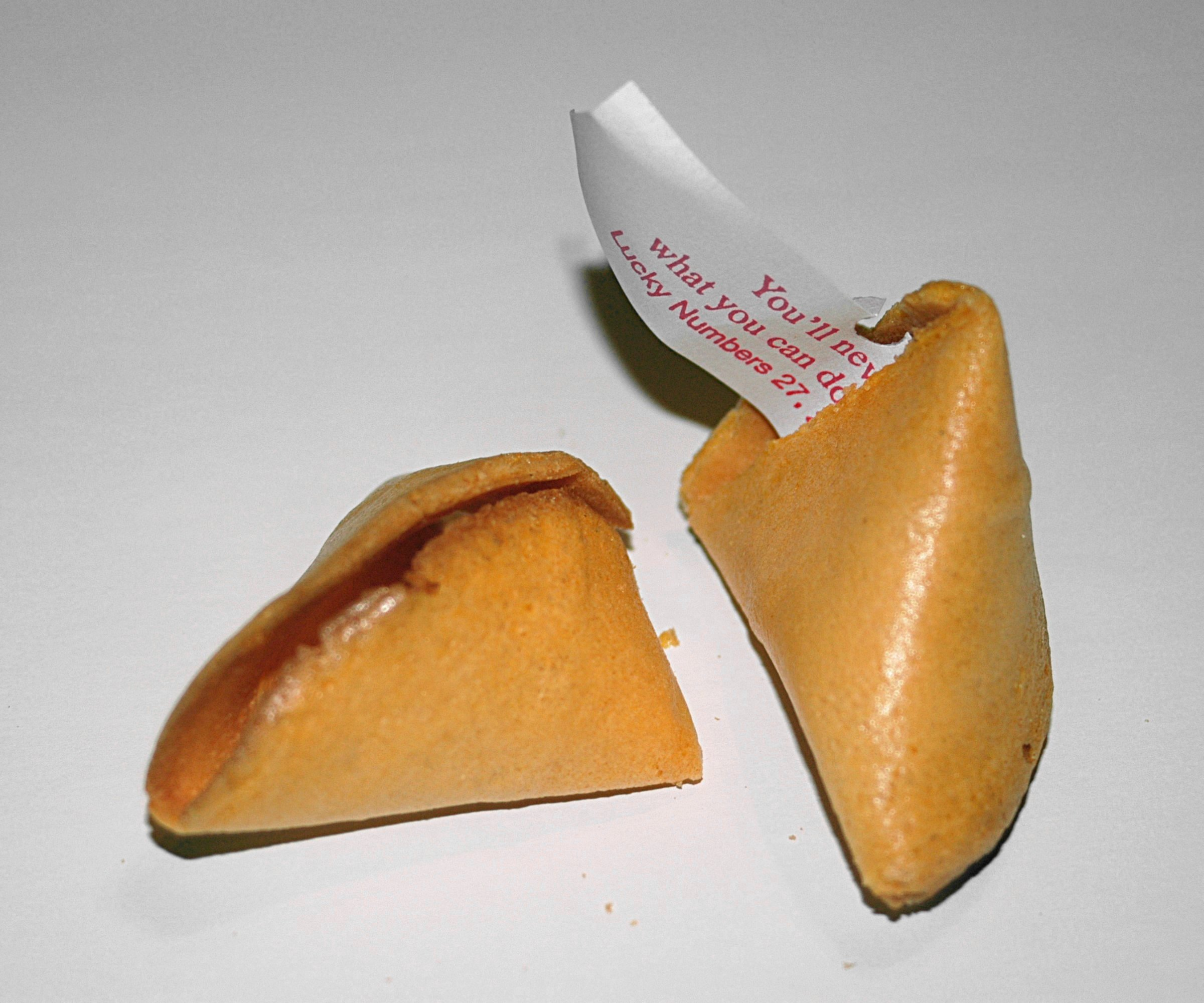
An opened fortune cookie

As far back as the 19th century, a cookie very similar in appearance to the modern fortune cookie was made in Kyoto, Japan, and there is a Japanese temple tradition of random fortunes, called omikuji. The Japanese version of the cookie differs in several ways: they are a little bit larger; are made of darker dough; and their batter contains sesame and miso. They contain a fortune; however, the small slip of paper was wedged into the bend of the cookie rather than placed inside the hollow portion. This kind of cookie is called tsujiura senbei (辻占煎餅) and is still sold in some regions of Japan, especially in Kanazawa, Ishikawa. It is also sold in the neighborhood of Fushimi Inari-taisha shrine in Kyoto.

Makoto Hagiwara of Golden Gate Park's Japanese Tea Garden in San Francisco is reported to have been the first person in the U.S. to have served the modern version of the cookie when he did so at the tea garden in the early 1900s. The fortune cookies were made by a San Francisco bakery, Benkyodo.

David Jung, founder of the Hong Kong Noodle Company in Los Angeles, made a competing claim that he invented the cookie in 1918. San Francisco's Court of Historical Review attempted to settle the dispute in 1983. During the proceedings, a fortune cookie was introduced as a piece of evidence with a message reading, "S.F. Judge who rules for L.A. Not Very Smart Cookie". A federal judge of the Court of Historical Review, from San Francisco themselves, determined that the cookie originated with Hagiwara and the court ruled in favor of San Francisco. The city of Los Angeles condemned the decision.

Seiichi Kito, the founder of Fugetsu-do of Little Tokyo in Los Angeles, also claims to have invented the cookie. Kito claims to have gotten the idea of putting a message in a cookie from Omikuji (fortune slip) which are sold at temples and shrines in Japan. According to his story, he sold his cookies to Chinese restaurants where they were greeted with much enthusiasm in both the Los Angeles and San Francisco areas, before spreading.

Up to around World War II, fortune cookies were known as "fortune tea cakes"—likely reflecting their origins in Japanese tea cakes.

Fortune cookies moved from being a confection dominated by Japanese-Americans to one dominated by Chinese-Americans sometime around World War II. One theory for why this occurred is because of the Japanese American internment during World War II, which forcibly put over 100,000 Japanese-Americans in internment camps, including those who had produced fortune cookies. This gave an opportunity for Chinese manufacturers.

Fortune cookies before the early 20th century were all made by hand. They are made from a simple batter of sugar, flour, water, and eggs. When heated, the dough stays flexible, allowing it to be shaped. As it cools, the sugar crystallizes, creating a crisp, glossy cookie. Traditionally, bakers would bake 3-inch circles of dough, insert a fortune while still warm, and use chopsticks to fold the cookie into its iconic shape before it hardened. The fortune cookie industry changed dramatically after the fortune cookie machine was invented by Edward Louie in the late 1960s. The machine allowed for mass production of fortune cookies which subsequently allowed the cookies to drop in price to become the novelty and courtesy dessert many Americans are familiar with after their meals at most Chinese restaurants today.

== Manufacturers ==
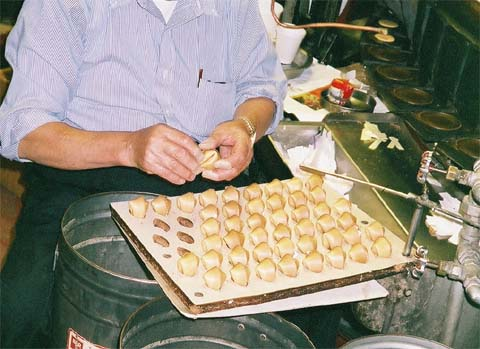
Hot fortune cookies being folded around paper fortunes at Golden Gate Fortune Cookie Factory

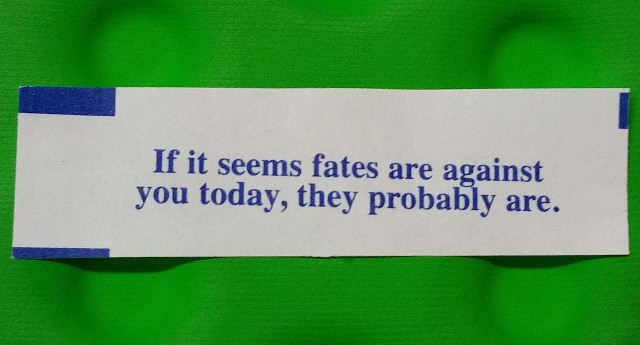
Unusual negative prediction found in a fortune cookie

There are approximately 3 billion fortune cookies made each year globally, the majority of them consumed in the US. The largest manufacturer of the cookies is Wonton Food, Inc., headquartered in Brooklyn, New York. They make over 4.5 million fortune cookies per day. Other large manufacturers are Baily International in the Midwest and Peking Noodle in Los Angeles. There are other smaller, local manufacturers including Tsue Chong Co. in Seattle, Keefer Court Food in Minneapolis, Sunrise Fortune Cookie in Philadelphia, and Golden Gate Fortune Cookie Factory in San Francisco. Many smaller companies will also sell custom fortunes.

Manufacturing processes vary, but they generally follow the same procedure. The ingredients (typically made with a base of flour, sugar, vanilla, and sesame seed oil) are mixed in a large tank and squirted onto fast moving trays. These function like a conveyor belt and are heated to cook the dough. Cookies are compressed with round hot plates to shape and cook them. The cookies bake for approximately one minute and are reshaped. They can be mechanically shaped or folded by hand. When automated, a machine folds the cookie into the correct orientation with the fortune inside. Cooled and hardened cookies are sealed in plastic wrappers, which are inspected before being shipped. Today, most cookies are produced in the United States.

== Marketing ==
The message inside may include a list of lucky numbers used by some as lottery numbers; since relatively few distinct messages are printed, in the recorded case where winning numbers happened to be printed, the lottery had an unexpectedly high number of winners sharing a prize. Authorities briefly investigated Wonton Food in 2005, after 110 Powerball lottery players won about $19 million after using the "lucky numbers" on the back of fortunes.

Fortune cookies are sometimes used for special marketing promotions. For example, the film Kung Fu Panda 3 was promoted by putting quotations from the protagonist of the film on fortune cookie slips.

In 1989, fortune cookies were reportedly imported into Hong Kong and sold as "genuine American fortune cookies". Wonton Food attempted to expand its fortune cookie business into China in 1992, but gave up after fortune cookies were considered "too American".

== Nutrition ==
Cookies from different manufacturers have different ingredients and nutritional content. One cookie typically contains around 80 to 130 kilojoules (20 to 30 kilocalories) of food energy and 5–7 g of total carbohydrates. A cookie may have sugar varying from 0–3 g, between 2–8 mg of sodium, and may have significant (compared to their size) amounts of iron or protein. The small size means they have little overall nutritional value.

== Around the world ==
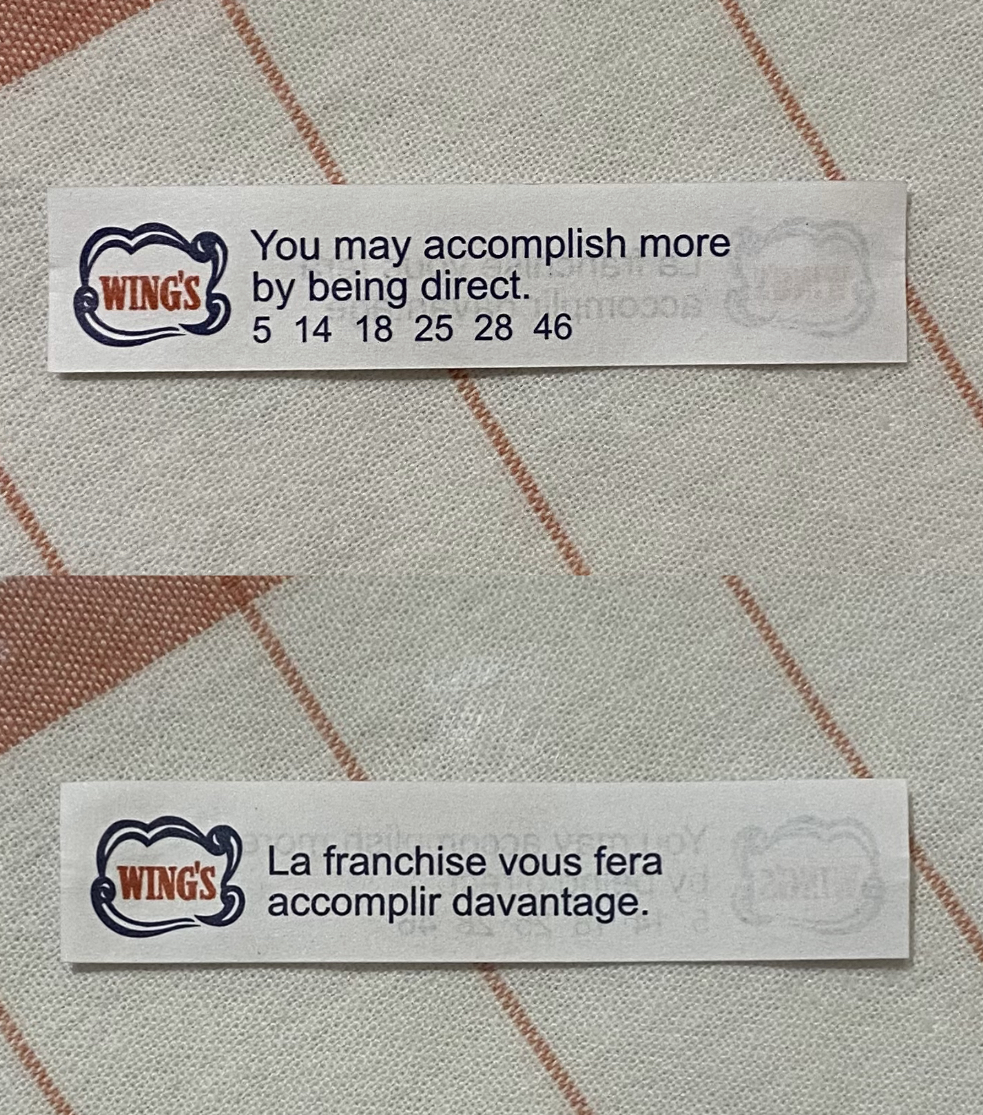
The fortunes in Canadian fortune cookies are generally written in English and French.

Fortune cookies, while largely an American item, have been served in Chinese restaurants in Australia, Argentina, Brazil, Canada, France, Germany, India, Italy, Mexico, New Zealand, Norway, Singapore, the United Kingdom, and the United Arab Emirates, among others.

There are also multi-cultural versions of the fortune cookie. For instance, the Mexican version of the fortune cookie, called the "Lucky Taco", is a red taco-shaped cookie with a fortune inside. The same company that makes the Lucky Taco also makes a "Lucky Cannoli", inspired by Italian cannolis.

== See also ==
- Golden Gate Fortune Cookie Company
- List of American foods
- Aleuromancy
- Barquillo
- Kuih kapit
- Shortbread, a similar cookie made with butter instead of sesame oil
