= Teegarden (surname) =

Teegarden is an Americanized version of the surname Theegarten. Notable people with the surname include:

- Aimee Teegarden (born 1989), American actress, model, and producer
- Bonnard J. Teegarden (born 1940), American astrophysicist credited with discovering Teegarden's Star
- David Teegarden, American rock drummer

== See also ==
- Teagarden
