= Tea garden (disambiguation) =

A tea garden is a garden associated with the drinking of tea.

Tea garden may also refer to:

- Tea plantation, a place where tea bushes are cultivated
- Tea Gardens, New South Wales, a locality in NSW, Australia
- Teagarden, a surname

== See also ==
- Japanese Tea Garden (disambiguation)
