= Hong Kong Noodle Company =

Coordinates: 34.036286°N 118.250925°W

- Company type: Private
- Industry: Food industry (Chinese noodles)
- Founded: 1913; 113 years ago
- Headquarters: 710 East 9th Place, Los Angeles, CA

Hong Kong Noodle Company is a manufacturer of Chinese noodles, wonton skins, and egg roll wrappers in Los Angeles, United States. It was founded in 1913 by Canton native David Jung, who had immigrated to Los Angeles.

== Fortune cookies ==
The company claims that Jung invented the fortune cookie in 1918, though this origin is disputed. Its original cookies contained Bible verses and were made for distribution to the poor, but a more conversational version soon became popular as an appetizer at nearby restaurants.

A 1930s-era can of the company's cookies, labeled as "tea cakes", is preserved in the Smithsonian Institution collection, along with a baker's hat. The company stopped producing fortune cookies around the year 2000.
