= Teagarden =

Teagarden is an English surname. Notable people with the surname include:

- Charlie Teagarden (1913–1984), American jazz trumpeter; brother of Jack Teagarden
- Jack Teagarden (1905–1964), American jazz trombonist and singer
- Norma Teagarden (1913–1996), American jazz trombonist; sister of Jack Teagarden
- Taylor Teagarden (born 1983), American professional baseball player

Fictional characters

- Aurora Teagarden, created by Charlaine Harris

== See also ==
- Tea garden (disambiguation)
- Teegarden (surname)
