= Court of Historical Review =

Mock court in San Francisco, California

The Court of Historical Review (sometimes called the Court of Historical Review and Appeal) is a mock court in San Francisco, California. It has been convened on irregular intervals over several decades in order to decide questions of historical curiosity. The court's judgment is purely symbolic and has no legal or academic authority. The court has been presided over by a number of actual or retired judges, including U.S. District Court Judge Daniel Hanlon and San Francisco Municipal Court Judge George T. Choppelas.

Though it is a mock court, a number of notable attorneys and civic figures have argued cases and appeared as "witnesses", sometimes in character as historical figures. The court's proceedings are described as colorful and are reported widely.

== Cases ==
The most widely noted case before the Court of Historical Review was in 1983, when it determined that the fortune cookie was invented in San Francisco, not Los Angeles. Participants in the case "wore yellow makeup and Celestial costumes and spoke in pidgin English as they presented the oral history underlying each side’s case".

Lefty O'Doul was not named to the Baseball Hall of Fame before his death in December 1969, and is still waiting to be recognized—an ongoing issue important to many fans of the game. The 76th meeting of the Court of Historical Review in 1997 heard spirited arguments from the opposition justifying his exclusion, along with others supporting his admittance. In the end, Judge George T. Choppelas's accepted criterion was sufficient for O'Doul's induction into the Hall of Fame. The verdict was passionately greeted with boos and cheers by both sides of the controversy.

While many issues brought before the court were of uncertain merit—such as determining Elvis Presley was indeed dead—others had a much more serious tone, "retrying" controversial cases which had already passed through actual courts of law. For example, although Shoeless Joe Jackson had been acquitted over the 1919 Black Sox Scandal in 1921, stories about his presumed guilt continued to be distributed; he was barred from playing ball professionally and could not be admitted into the Baseball Hall of Fame. In 1993, Jackson's innocence was affirmed by the Court of Historical Review. Some International Church of the Foursquare Gospel leaders used the Aimee Semple McPherson ruling in 1990 as a modern vindication by law professionals who re-examined the evidence, agreeing with the earlier grand jury inquiries that there was nothing substantial disproving their founder's 1926 kidnapping story. The mock court did not come to any decisive ruling on whether or not Bruno Hauptman was guilty of his charged crimes resulting in his execution, but recommended that the case be reopened. This prompted a reply from New Jersey authorities who stated they saw no reason to do so.

A partial list of the verdicts of the court include:

- A ruling in 1983 that the Martini was invented in San Francisco, and not nearby Martinez, California. However, the decision was later reversed by a Martinez Appellate Court that included California Appellate Court Justices Wakefield Taylor and Frank Bray, confirming that the Martini was invented in Martinez.
- A ruling in 1987 that chicken soup deserves its reputation as "Jewish penicillin".
- A 1989 ruling that Albert Einstein did not meet with Marilyn Monroe.
- A recommendation that the Bruno Hauptman case be re-opened.
- A ruling in 1990 that the legend of Cinderella originated in Italy, rather than France, China, or the United States.
- A ruling in 1990 that there was never any substantial evidence to show Aimee Semple McPherson's kidnapping story to be untrue.
- Another ruling in 1990 that mystery author Dashiell Hammett did work as a detective for the Pinkerton's National Detective Agency.
- A ruling in 1993 that Shoeless Joe Jackson was not guilty in the 1919 Black Sox scandal.
- Another ruling in 1993 that Elvis Presley was, in fact, dead.
- A ruling in 1997 that Lefty O'Doul deserves to be admitted into the Baseball Hall of Fame.
