= Tsujiura senbei =

Tsujiura senbei

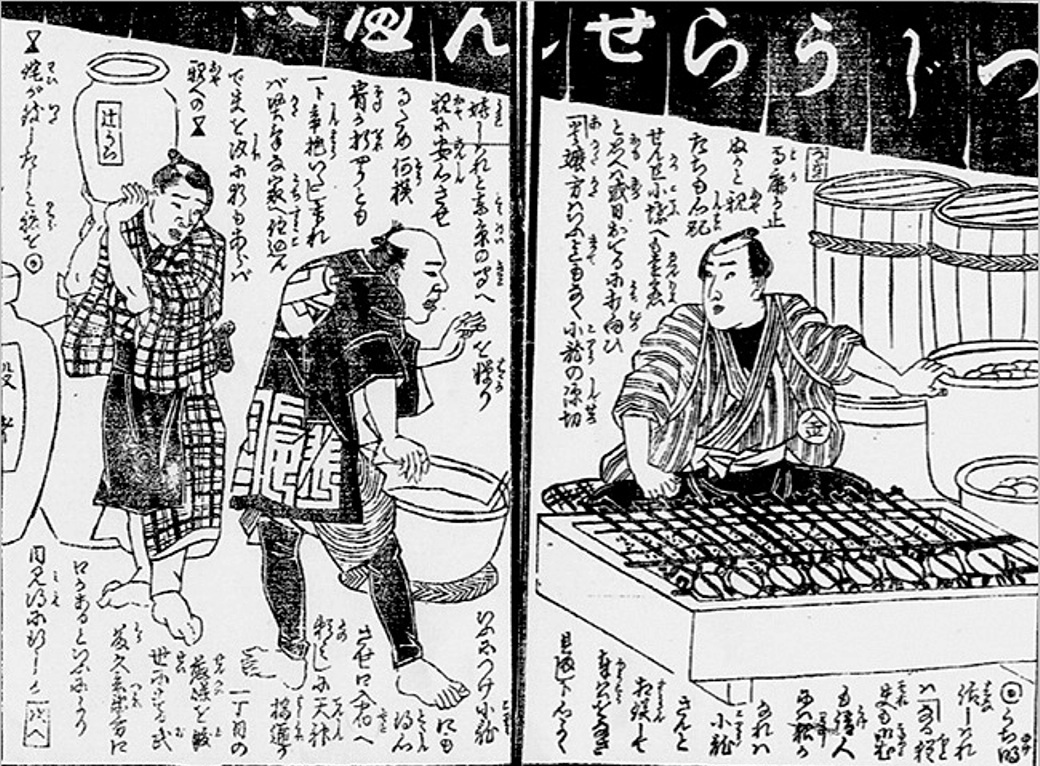
Baking Tsujiura Senbei in the Edo period (1603–1868), from a book written in 1878

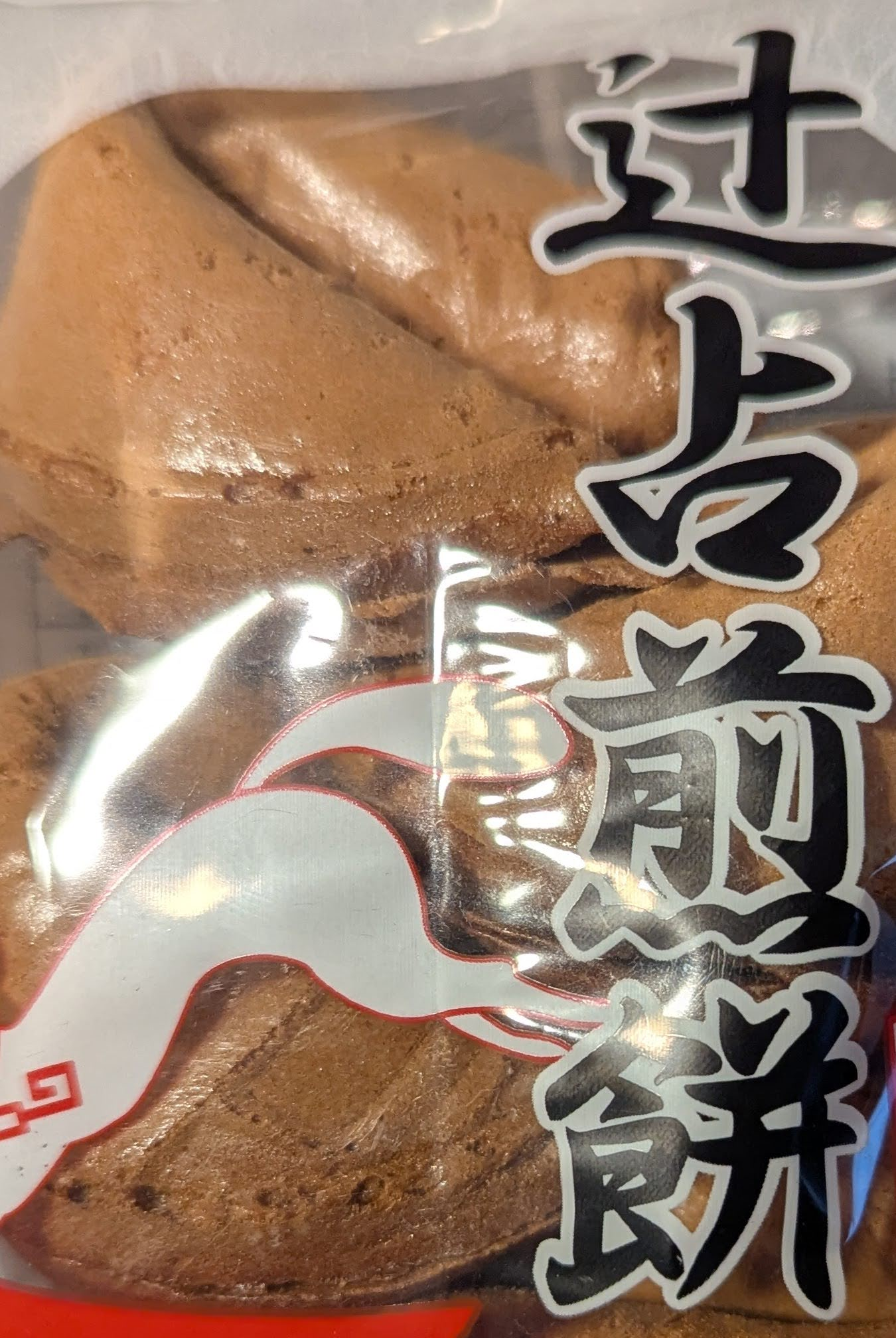
21st century Tsujiura senbei package

Tsujiura (Japanese: 辻占) are notes used in Japan in conjunction with rice crackers called senbei in a similar way to fortune cookies.

Several publications make the claim that fortune cookies are derived from tsujiura senbei.
