= Japanese Tea Garden (San Francisco) =

Garden in California, United States

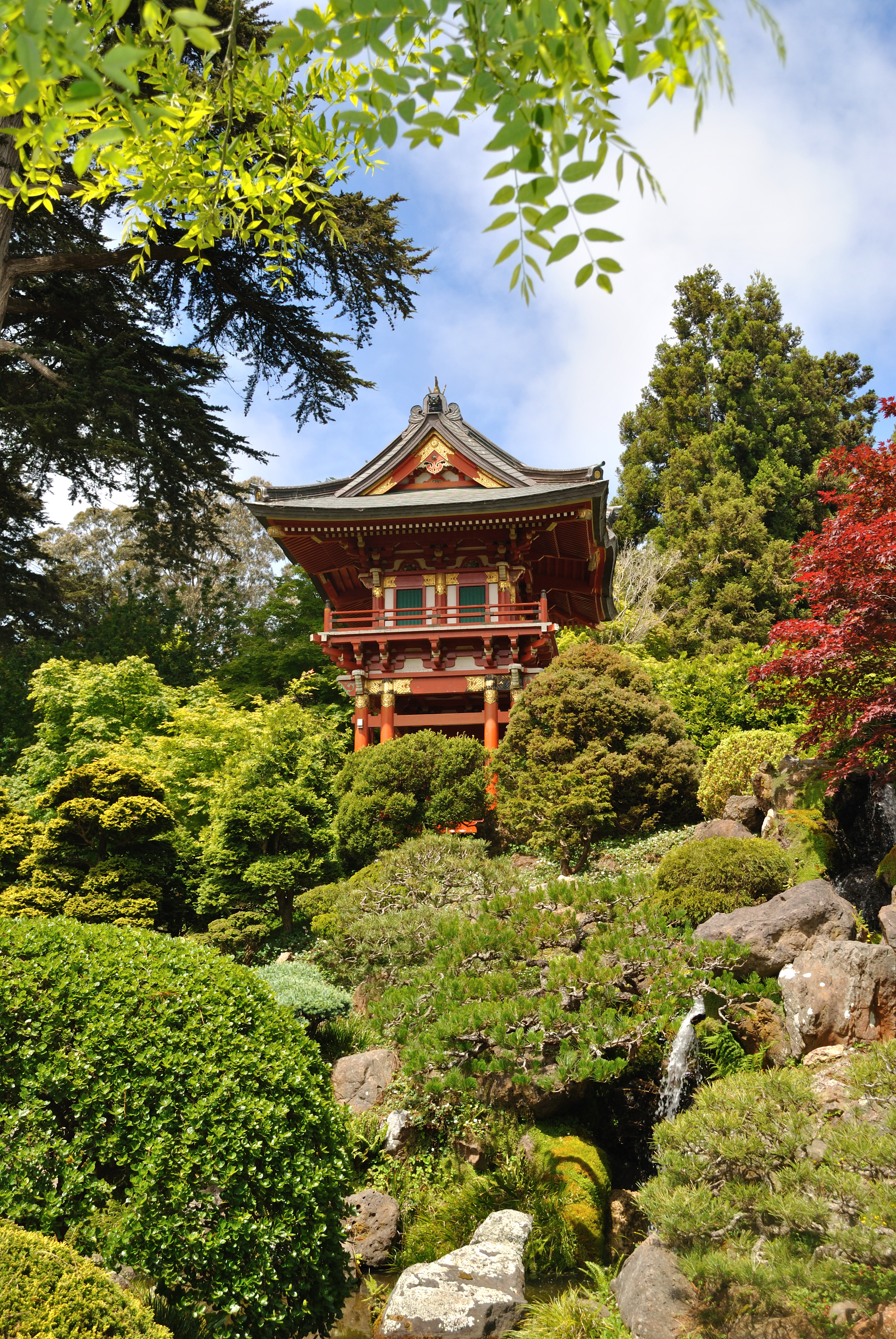
- Japanese Tea Garden

- Location within San Francisco County
- Type: Public
- Location: San Francisco, California, United States
- Nearest city: San Francisco
- Coordinates: 37°46′12″N 122°28′13″W
- Area: 5 acres (2.0 ha)
- Created: 1894 by George Turner Marsh
- Status: Open year round
- Public transit: 9th and Irving
- Website: japaneseteagardensf.com

The Japanese Tea Garden (Japanese: 日本茶園) in San Francisco, California, is a popular feature of Golden Gate Park, originally built as part of a sprawling World's Fair, the California Midwinter International Exposition of 1894. Though many of its attractions are still a part of the garden today, there have been changes throughout the history of the garden that have shaped it into what it is today.

The oldest public Japanese garden in the United States, this complex of many paths, ponds and a teahouse features plants and trees pruned and arranged in a Japanese style. The garden's 3 acres contain sculptures and structures influenced by Buddhist and Shinto religious beliefs, as well as many elements of water and rocks to create a calming landscape designed to slow people down.

The Japanese Tea Garden is now one of the three locations of the Gardens of Golden Gate Park, along with the San Francisco Botanical Garden and the Conservatory of Flowers.

== History ==
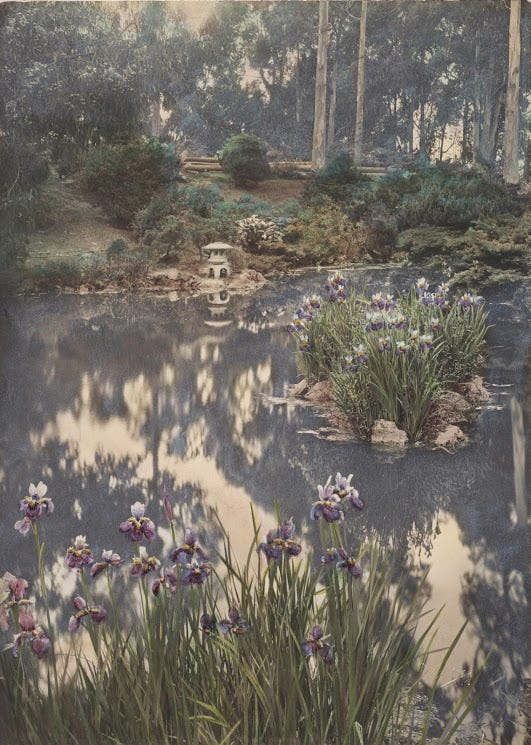
Willard Worden, Japanese Tea Garden, gelatin silver print with applied color, c. 1915.

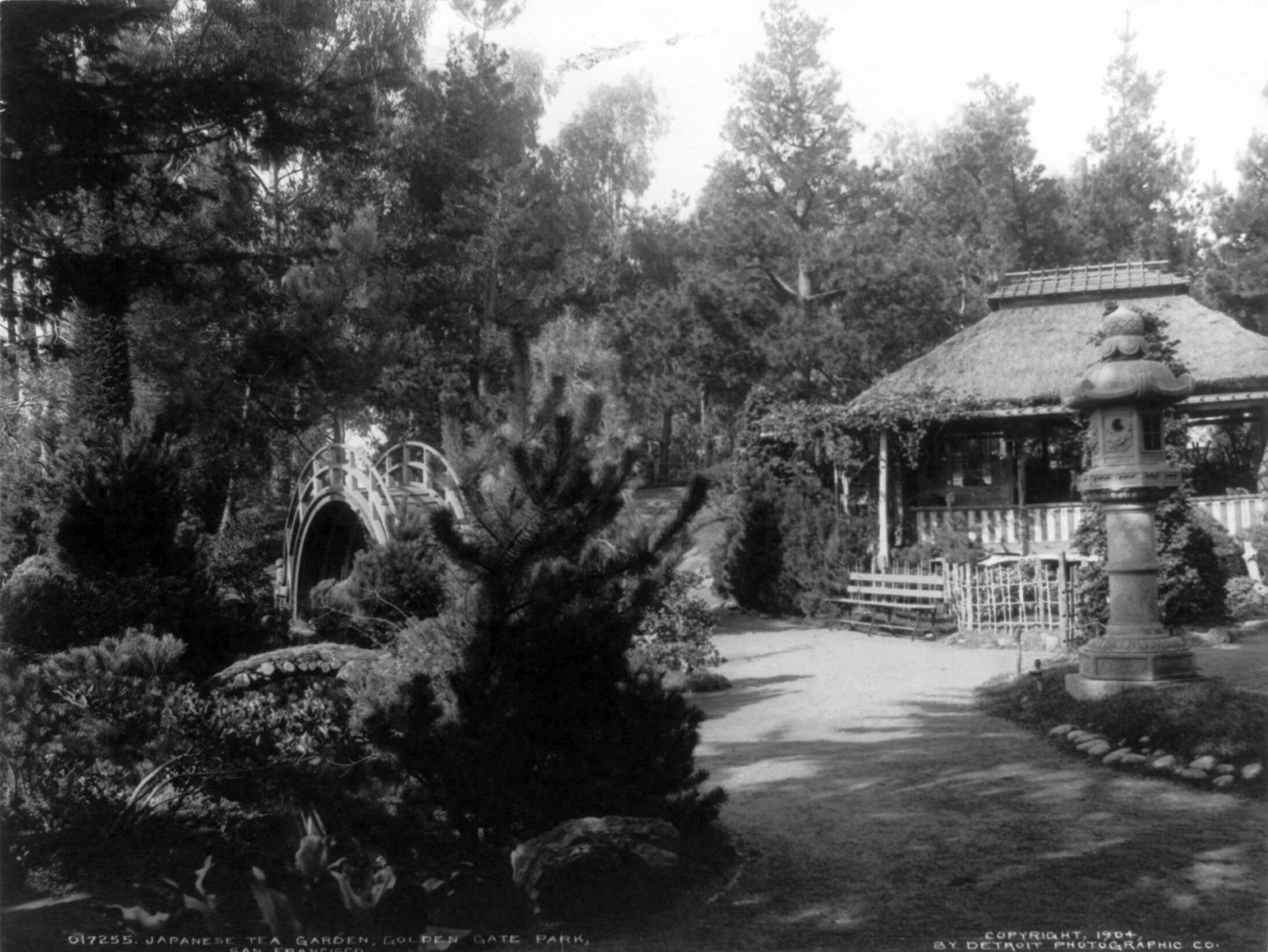
The tea garden in 1904

The Japanese Tea Garden began as the Japanese Village and Tea Garden at the 1894 World's Fair. It was built by Australian born George Turner Marsh, who hired Japanese craftsmen to construct the site. After the close of the fair, Marsh sold his concession to the city of San Francisco for $4,500. Makoto Hagiwara, a Japanese immigrant and gardener, was then hired to manage the garden. He personally oversaw the modification of the temporary Japanese Village fair exhibit to the permanent Japanese Tea Garden and was official caretaker of the garden for most of the time between 1895 and 1925. He imported from Japan many plants, birds, and the now famous koi fish, and he more than tripled the size of the garden.

After San Francisco's 1915 Panama–Pacific International Exposition closed, the South Gate, the Temple Gate, and the Pagoda were acquired from that fair's Japanese exhibits.

Following Makoto Hagiwara's death in 1925 his daughter, Takano Hagiwara, and her children became the proprietors and maintainers of the garden. With the onset of World War II in America and rising anti Japanese sentiment, Takano Hagiwara and her family were evicted from the family's home and sent to an internment camp. 120,000 Japanese and Americans of Japanese descent were sent to internment camps during the war. Despite John McLaren's agreement with Hagiwara, the displacement of his family terminated their residence in their home in the garden, which McLaren had promised for 99 years and the family was not allowed back or reimbursed after the war ended. In the period of their absence, the garden was renamed "The Oriental Tea Garden," and some structures expressing Japanese sentiment were demolished, including the Hagiwara home, and the original Shinto Shrine. Japanese tea servers were replaced with Chinese women in their traditional dress.

In postwar 1952, the title "Japanese Tea Garden" was reinstated and the Hagiwara family was offered minimal assistance in the restoration of the garden, for which they had been engaged. The period that followed was one of reconciliation. In 1949, the Gump Family donated a bronze Buddha. Because the 1951 Japanese Peace Treaty was signed in San Francisco, on January 8, 1953, Yasasuke Katsuno, the Japanese Consul General, presented a 9,000 pound Lantern of Peace. The lantern was commissioned in small donations by the children of Japan as a symbol of friendship toward future generations in the United States. At this time, Nagao Sakurai designed a "Peace Garden" and a karesansui or dry landscape garden. Karesansui are commonly referred to as Zen Gardens outside of Japan, but that name was assigned by those foreign to Japan. In 1974, a plaque contrived by artist Ruth Asawa was gifted to the garden in honor of Makoto Hagiwara and his family for their dedication to the garden's beginnings and expansion. The San Francisco Recreation & Park Department, which has maintained the garden since 1942, named the road bordering the garden Hagiwara Tea Garden Drive in 1986 to further honor the garden's original benefactors.

== Significant features ==
=== The Tea House ===
The Tea House has been a part of the Japanese Tea Garden since its creation at the Mid-winter Fair in 1894, though it has been rebuilt several times. In a description of the garden published in 1950, at a time when it was "dubbed the Oriental Tea Garden" the author, Katherine Wilson, states that "further along from the Wishing Bridge was the thatched teahouse, where for three generations the women of the Hagiwara family, in their gaily, flowered kimonos, served tea and rice cakes." Within Japanese Culture, the connection between the serenity of nature and the drinking of tea comes from a sacred tradition, the Japanese Tea Ceremony. The origin of the tea ceremony dates back to 1203 AD, "with Buddhist priests of the Zen sect, who found the infusion [tea] useful in keeping them awake during midnight devotions." As it developed, the ceremony eventually earned the name Chanoyu, which, in literal translation means "hot water for tea." Today, the heart of the tradition is the elegant making and pouring of whipped green tea, also called Matcha. When the "ceremony is well executed, an unspoken and perhaps inexpressible Zen quality lingers in the air." As Tea Ceremonies became more widespread, they eventually became associated with the presence or nature, more specifically with the presence of a garden. Over time, the tea house became "the transcendent viewing place for contemplating the landscape" in a traditional tea garden.

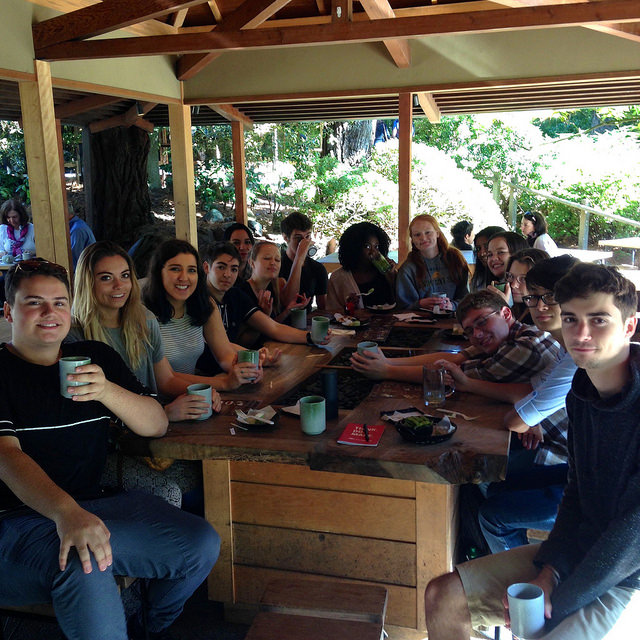
University of San Francisco students enjoy tea and snacks at the Tea House

The Tea House is located by the water, and is surrounded by views of different aspects of the garden. The Tea House currently offers six kinds of tea: Jasmine, Sencha, Hōjicha, Genmaicha, Iced Green, and the traditional tea used in ceremonies, Matcha. It also offers a variety of snacks, some of which are savory including Edamame and Tea Sandwiches, and some of which are sweet including Kuzumochi and Green Tea Cheesecake.

=== "Treasure Tower" pagoda ===
The pagoda in the Japanese Tea Garden is a five-tiered Buddhist shrine. It, along with the Temple Gate, was built as a temporary indoor display for the Japanese section inside the Palace of Food Products at the 1915 Panama-Pacific Exposition. After the conclusion of the PPIE, the pagoda and Temple Gate were moved into the Japanese Tea Garden.

A pagoda is a narrow building with a multi-tiered roof style that originates from the Buddhist religion in India and East Asia. There are two types of pagodas: tombs, for high ranking Buddhist monks, and shrines, used for worship. The pagoda in this garden is the latter. The pagoda in the garden was moved from its original spot about sixty feet West to where the Shinto shrine originally stood. Due to local anti-Japanese sentiment during WWII which led to the relocation of Japanese Americans, the Shinto shrine was demolished and the Buddhist pagoda replaced the open space. This placement of the pagoda is strange in a religious context because it was within an area bounded by the ‘mizugaki’, a traditional shinto picket fence.

=== Drum bridge ===
A taiko bashi, or drum bridge is a highly arched pedestrian bridge found in Chinese and Japanese gardens. It is thus named because when reflected on the water, the full circle shape it creates resembles a drum. Today a bronze plaque at the bridge "recognizes the dedication and expertise of Shinshichi Nakatani for his unique contribution to the City and to the charm of the Japanese Tea Garden." The bridge's Japanese design, which was adapted from the Chinese, has 3 main functions: to slow people down, to let barges on the canal go smoothly under the bridge, and to reflect a full circle on the water resembling a drum.

=== Karesansui - dry landscape garden ===
This part of the garden was designed by Nagao Sakurai and dedicated on January 8, 1953. A waterfall and a body of water are represented by large stones and gravel raked in waves. Islands are in the shape of tortoises, which are symbols of immortality and good luck. A karesansui, or dry landscape garden, is a style of Japanese garden where stones and gravel represent waterfalls, oceans, and mountains. Plants are sometimes, but not always, features in a karesansui garden. Entire landscapes can be represented by the use of thoughtfully arranged stone. The term “Zen Garden” was coined by American author Lorraine Kuck in her 1935 book titled “One Hundred Kyoto Gardens”. Although many of these gardens can be found at Zen Buddhist temples, karesansui are not exclusively associated with Zen.

== Physical design elements ==
=== Trees ===
The trees of the Japanese Tea Garden have more than a century-long history. The garden consists of a variety of trees, including flowering cherry trees, azaleas, magnolias, camellias, Japanese maples, pines, cedars and cypresses. The dwarf trees were planted by the Hagiwara family in the years following the Midwinter Exposition of 1894. However, when Japanese-Americans were thrown into internment camps in 1942, the dwarf trees left with the Hagiwara family. These trees were then sold to Dr. Hugh and Audrey Fraser, who in her will, entrusted the trees back to the Japanese Tea Garden. Samuel Newsom, an expert on Japanese Gardens and Japanese trees, redesigned the dwarf trees in 1965 after the dwarf trees returned to the garden. Newsom designed the dwarf trees onto the hillside, next to the waterfall, and, in 1966 planted more below the Temple Gate. Most of these dwarf trees originated in Japan, brought over by the Hagiwara family. The oldest tree was a Japanese black pine, which is now on a bamboo frame next to the Tea House. In 2005, the San Francisco Parks Trust and the San Francisco Recreation and Park Development repaired additional landscape and recognized the history of the trees via plaques.

Today, the Monterey pine trees are among the more labor-intensive in the garden, according to previous landscape supervisor of Golden Gate Park, Ed Schuster. Every three years, the pines are layered into zig-zagged planes, creating an artistic design favored in traditional Japanese landscapes. These pines average sixty feet tall, so city arborists use ropes to climb to the tops and take great care pruning each tree.

=== Water ===
Water commonly plays a large role in Japanese gardens and serves to highlight purity and liveliness. Ponds and waterfalls are often placed with precise orientations with respect to the sun to determine the reflection. In the native Japanese religion, ponds were created for sacred reasons as places for the gods to roam while the surrounding stones were utilized as seats. The auditory atmosphere of the Japanese Tea Garden is created through the blissful and peaceful sound of the moving water. Tsukubai, found in the Japanese Tea Garden, is a water basin originally used by guests to purify themselves before taking part in the tea ceremony. The dry garden at the Japanese Tea Garden represents the importance of water through wave patterns and artificial islands created by rocks. Water has remained an integral representation of Japanese Gardens and its connection to the elite world of immortals.

=== Rocks ===
Rocks are integral components of the traditional Japanese garden. They are generally thought of as the backbone of the arrangement of the space and as "dwelling places of gods, tokens of regal power, and symbols of longevity." Rocks serve three main purposes in the garden, the first of which is mimicking larger natural formations such as mountains and bodies of water. The second purpose is to form rock clusters. In Japanese Gardens, rocks are often clustered with one large rock as the base stone. Others are arranged around it so they agree with the mood or order set forth by the base. Those groups of rocks often appear to have order and flow while remaining asymmetrical. Thirdly, rocks can also serve the purpose of guiding the eyes to other parts of the garden. They point viewers toward the focal point of the design of the garden. Paths and stepping-stones are formed in irregular patterns so people slow down and notice the design around them. In addition, Shinto is a fundamental principle in Japanese gardening where rocks have a decorative duty depending on their positions. A tall stone standing erect of the ground, for example, is associated to masculinity, while a low flat stone represents femininity, mirroring Shinto belief that all things in nature contain gender equilibrium. The Japanese Tea Garden is a mixture of influential Shinto and Buddhist religious beliefs.

== Cultural and religious design ==
As a place of sacred ritual, a Japanese tea garden is highly representative of both Japanese culture and religious philosophy through the respected art forms of landscaping and architecture. Japanese aesthetics have been largely influenced by the geographic location of Japan, with emphases on isolation and the importance of water. Both Buddhist and Shinto religion can be seen in the design of the Japanese Tea Garden.

=== Japanese cultural aesthetics ===
The design of a Japanese tea garden is largely influenced by four main aesthetic principles in Japanese culture: miniaturization, concealment, extended scenery, and asymmetry.

==== Miniaturization ====
Miniaturization is the principle of evoking the entire of spirit of nature in a limited physical space (the Japanese Tea Garden of San Francisco is only 5 acres). It also encompasses the use of small stones and other small elements to represent the yin-yang. The Buddhist value of yin-yang expresses the incomplete and dynamic nature of everything around us. The yin-yang symbolizes multiple parts that come together to create a larger whole, and that nothing on its own is entirely whole or static. The coming together of water and stone is symbolic of the yin-yang in numerous locations throughout the San Francisco Japanese Tea Garden, as seen in the waterfalls, water basins made of stone, flat stones across the ponds, and waves in the stones of the dry Zen Garden.

==== Concealment ====
The aesthetics of the garden are further influenced by the principle of concealment, which involves messages that come in pieces to ultimately reveal a larger picture. For example, the dragon hedge of the Japanese Tea Garden only reveals itself as a dragon after being followed from tail to head.

==== Extended scenery ====
Extended scenery makes the limited space of the garden appear larger with the use of natural elements around its outside. Although the Japanese Tea Garden is located in the city of San Francisco, one cannot tell the garden is surrounded by an urban scene when inside. It is encompassed in tall greenery that visually extend the size of the garden.

==== Asymmetry ====
The fourth principle, asymmetry, is in some ways a continuation of the yin-yang. Asymmetry stresses the abstract and ever-changing nature of everything around us. This aesthetic principle is largely representative of the Buddhist principle of Wabi-sabi, which states that all things are imperfect, irregular, and impermanent. This principle is shown in the garden through the winding pathways, stones of many different sizes, and abstract placements of objects. Additionally, the changing of the waves in the dry Zen Garden is a tradition that honors wabi-sabi.

=== Religious design ===
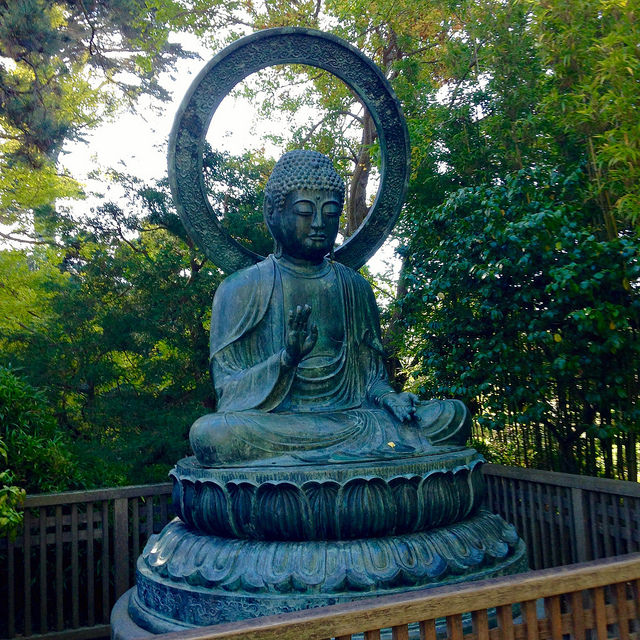

The distinctive and particular architecture and design of the Japanese Tea Garden is influenced by various aspects of Japanese culture and, more specifically, Japanese religion. The most prominent of these being the ancient Japanese religion of Shinto. The significance of various elements in the garden can be attributed to the fundamental principles and characteristics of Shinto, Buddhism, and even Taoism. All of these religions have a large emphasis on the importance of nature, and the importance of being one with nature. The placement of rocks, the way the water flows, the route of the paths, the placement of the trees, everything has to be done in such a way that promotes a natural flow, as emphasized in Taoism. In Shinto, it is believed that the spirits of ancestors, and spirits of the gods themselves, are manifested in nature. These spirits are called Kami, and these Kami are what determine the fortune of those living on Earth. The garden is designed so as to promote the happiness of these spirits, and to properly coexist with them. Cleanliness is also greatly emphasized in Shinto, which can also be noticed in the structure of the park, the park is not meant to appear crowded or difficult to navigate. In addition, the waterfall found in the garden is symbolic to the fact that cleansing of bad spirits by waterfall is considered the purest way to cleanse oneself in Shinto. Though the design is meant to convey many different elements of nature, flow, and Zen, all fundamentals in Buddhism, it is done simply.

==== Steep stairs ====
Many aesthetic elements of the garden catch the attention of tourists and can be traced back to Buddhist philosophy. The steep stairs in the garden are an element of nearly every center devoted to Buddhism. It is believed in Buddhism that Zen can be reached through stair climbing, as movement is often incorporated into meditation. In this way, sport/fitness can help achieve the connection between mind, body, and spirit. Many monks and nuns include exercise in their daily routines. It is also believed that Buddha himself said, "Good health is the highest gain." The steep stairs are also a reference to the climb Buddha made to the top of Vulture Peak, his favorite place of meditation. The climb is now made of 1500 steps up a steep hill.

==== Stone lanterns ====
The stone lanterns (tōrō) seen around the garden, like the Lantern of Peace that followed World War II, are representative of the five elements of Buddhism. The bases of the lanterns symbolize the earth, while the next section is water, the light is fire, and the following two sections symbolize the air and spirit respectively. The lanterns as a whole symbolize the coming together of all five elements in the harmony of nature, another example of wabi-sabi.

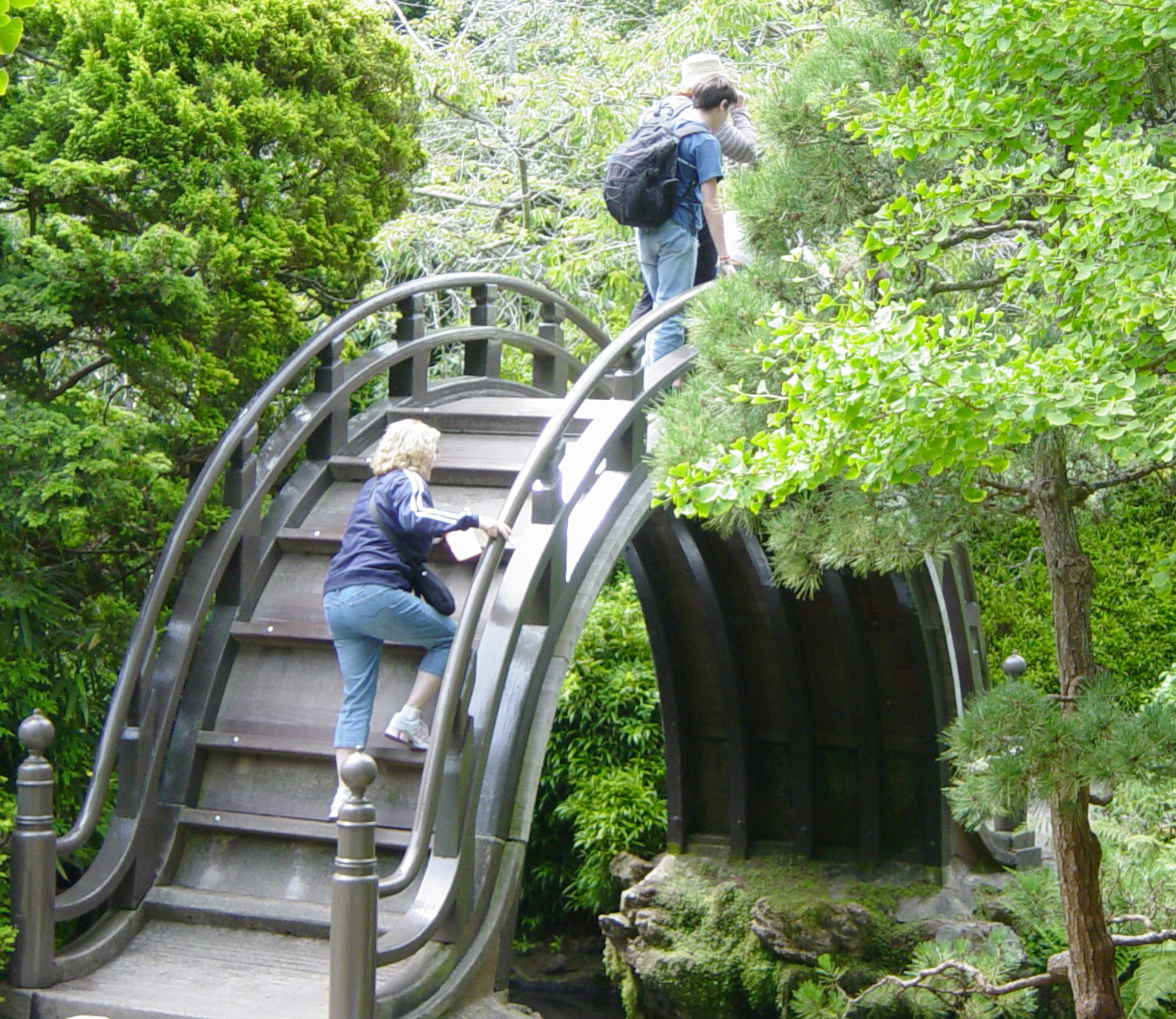
A decorative moon bridge in the Tea Garden

== Gallery ==
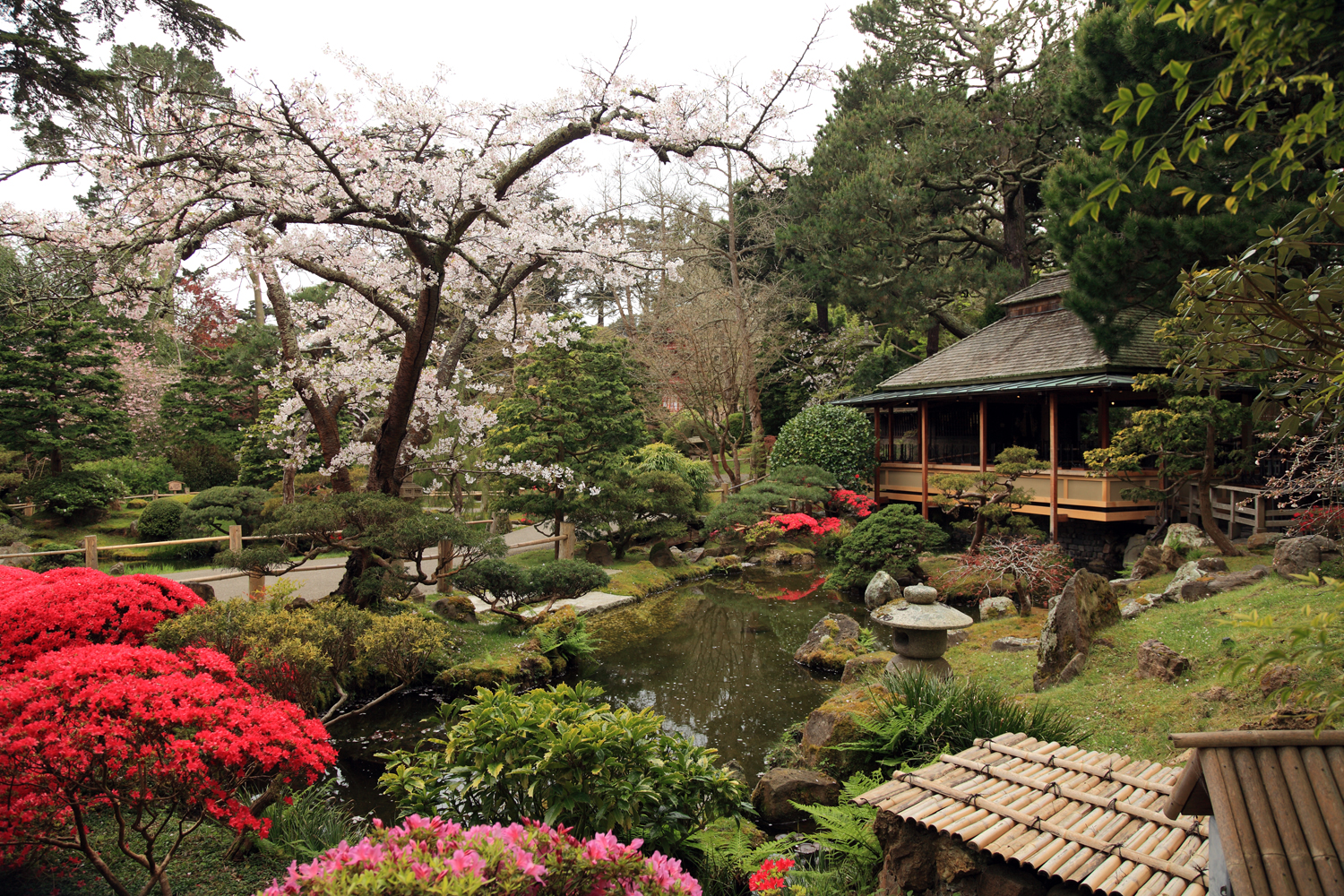

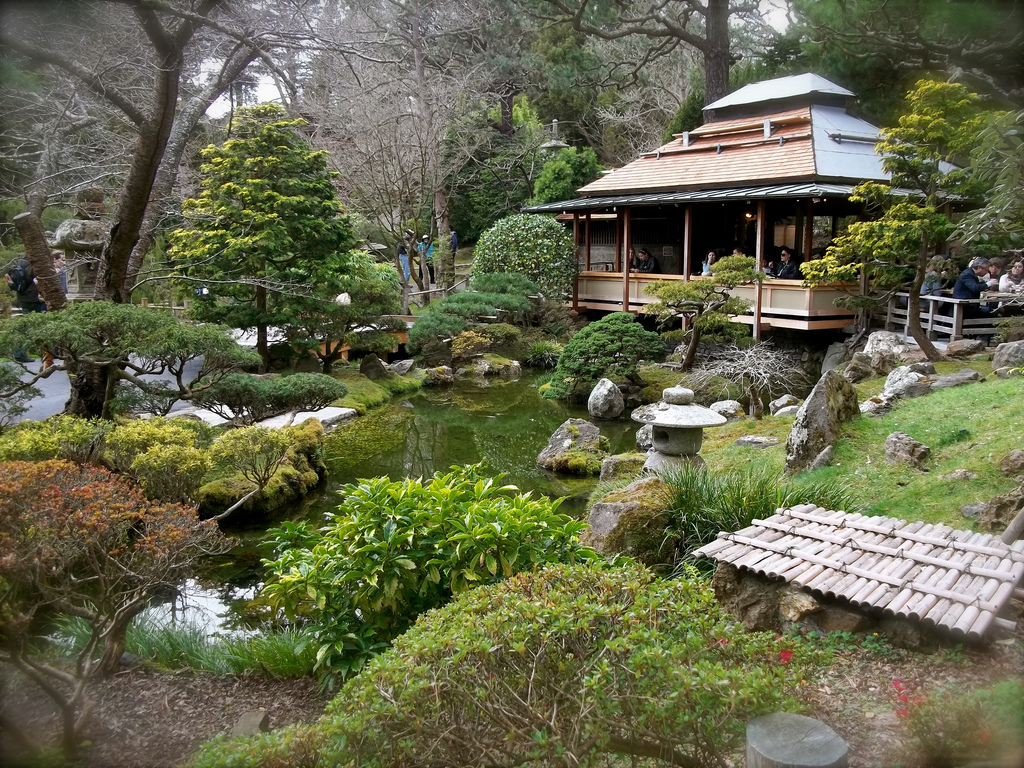

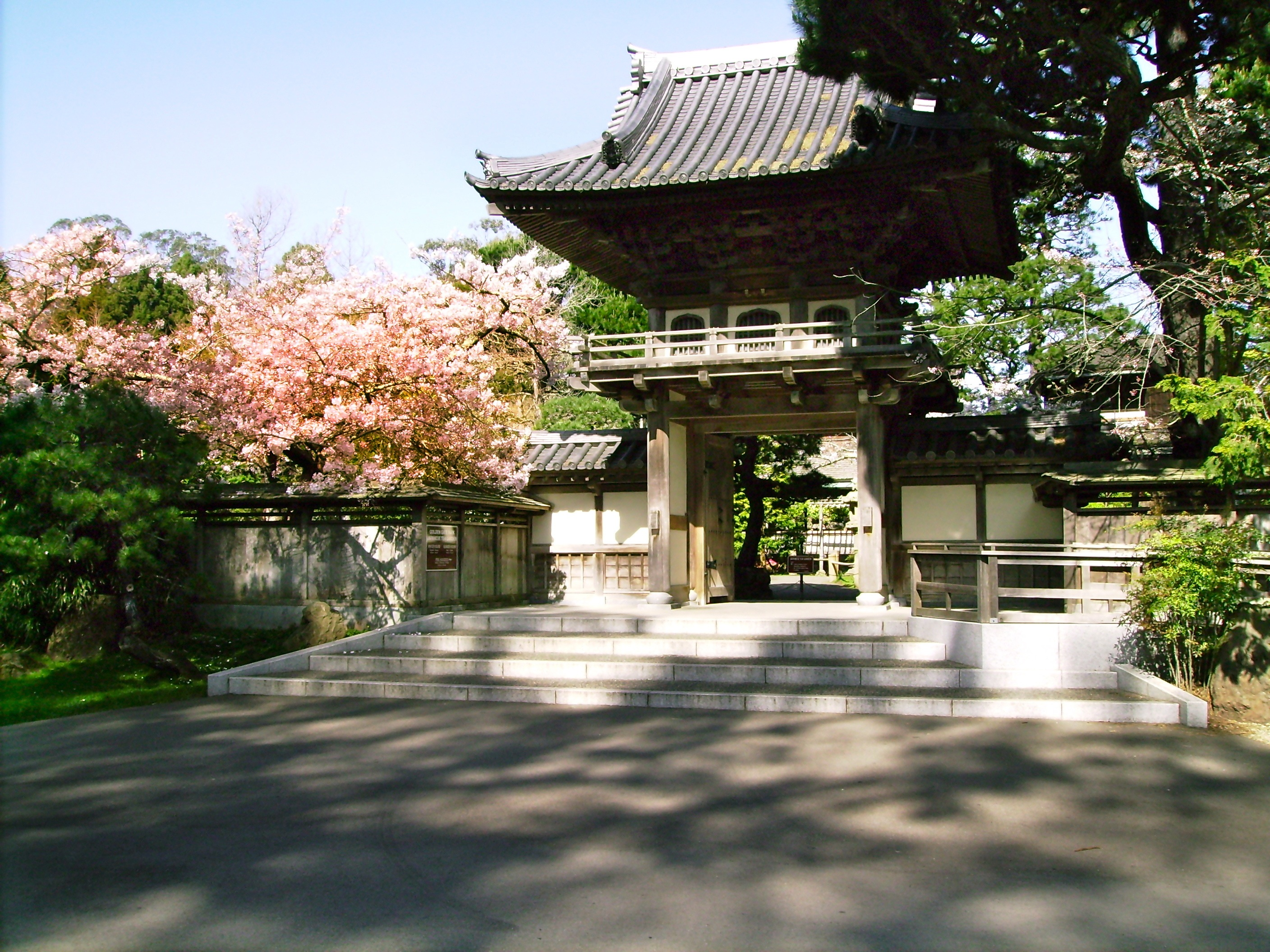

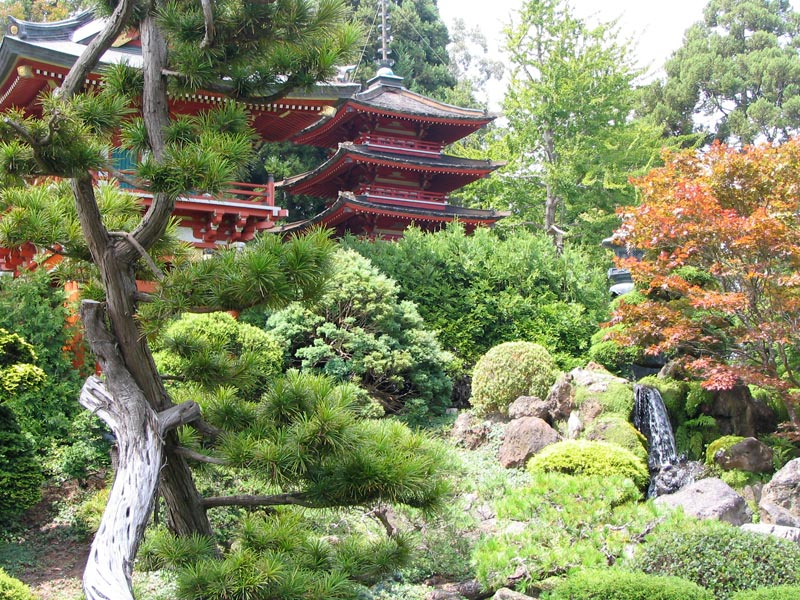

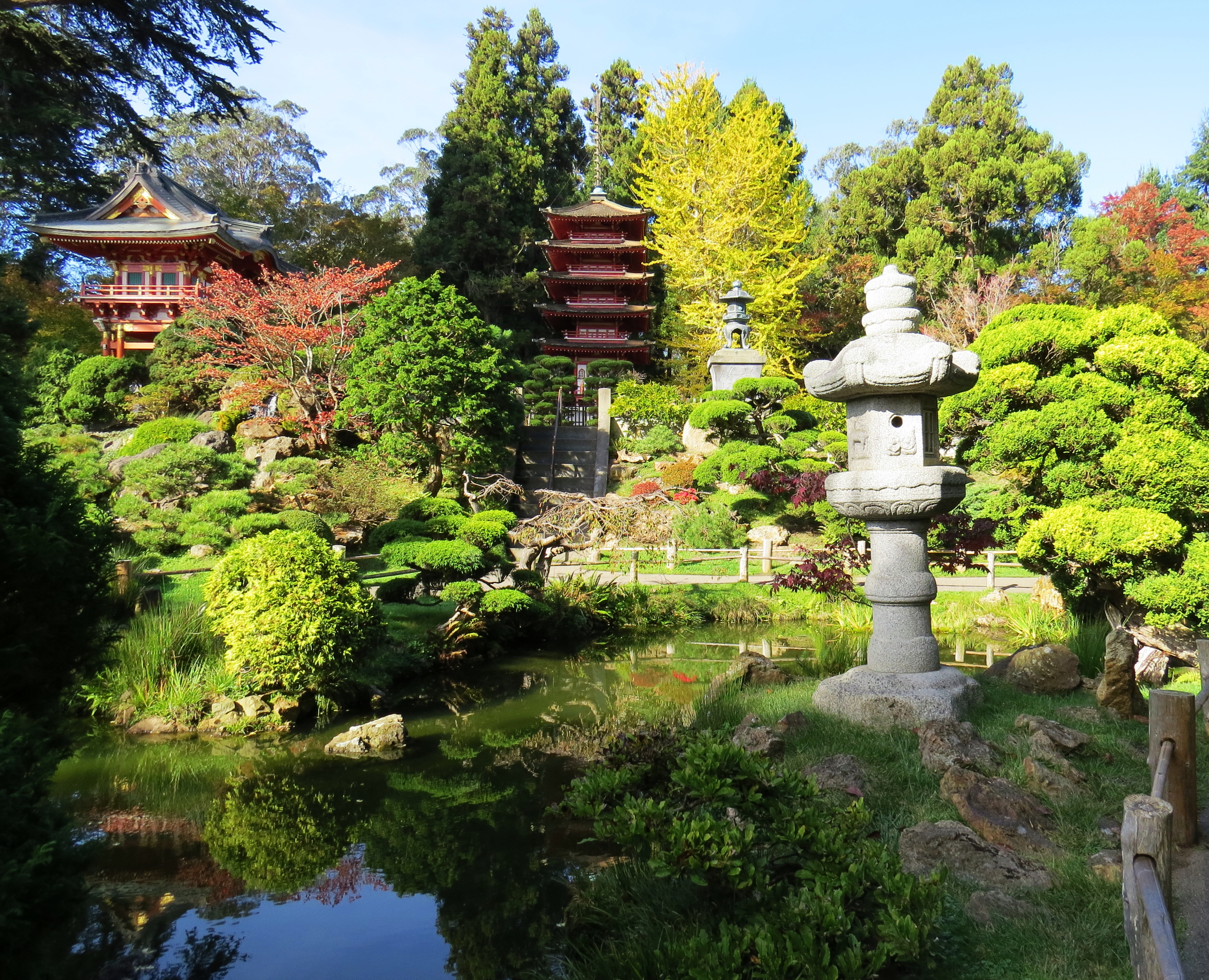

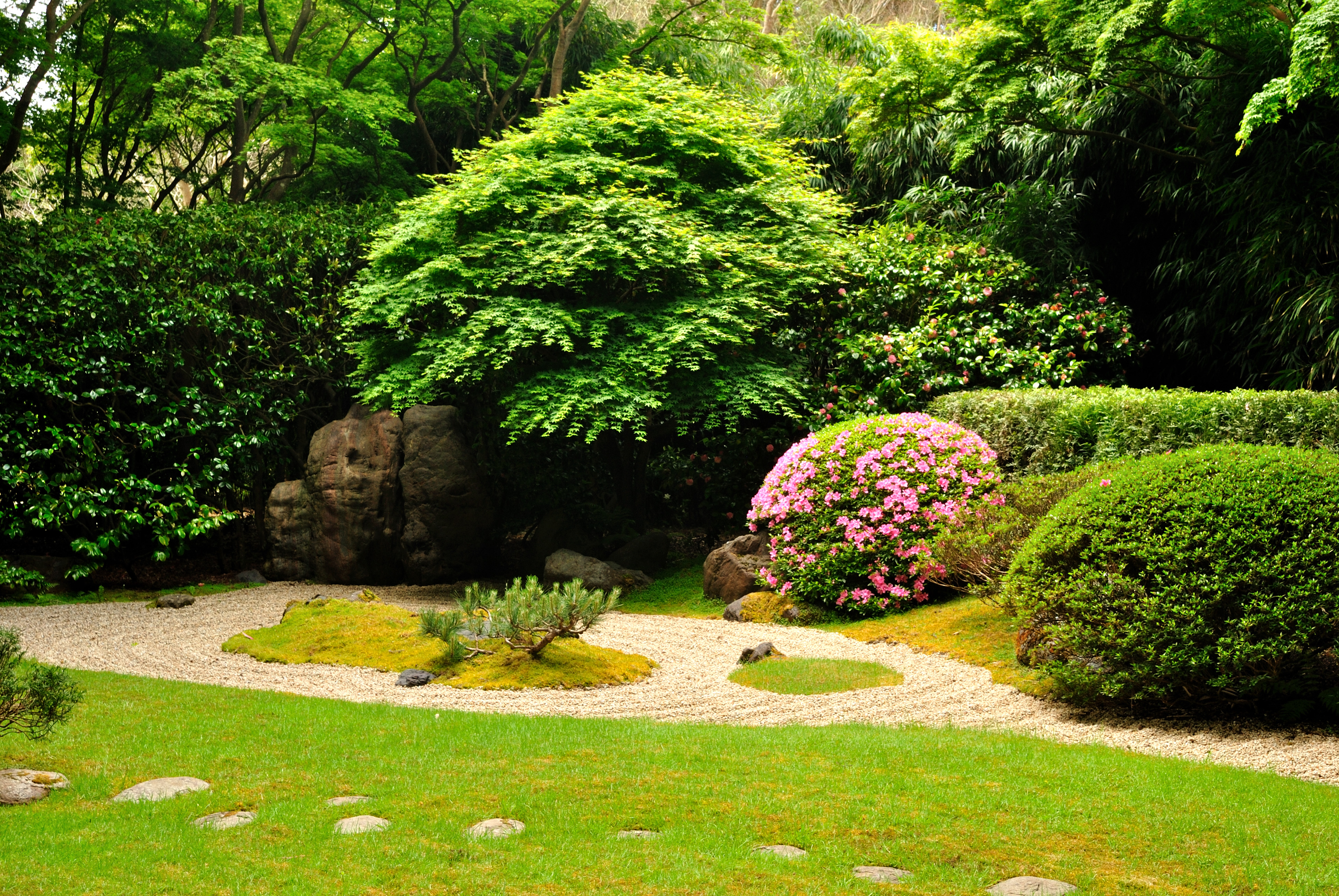

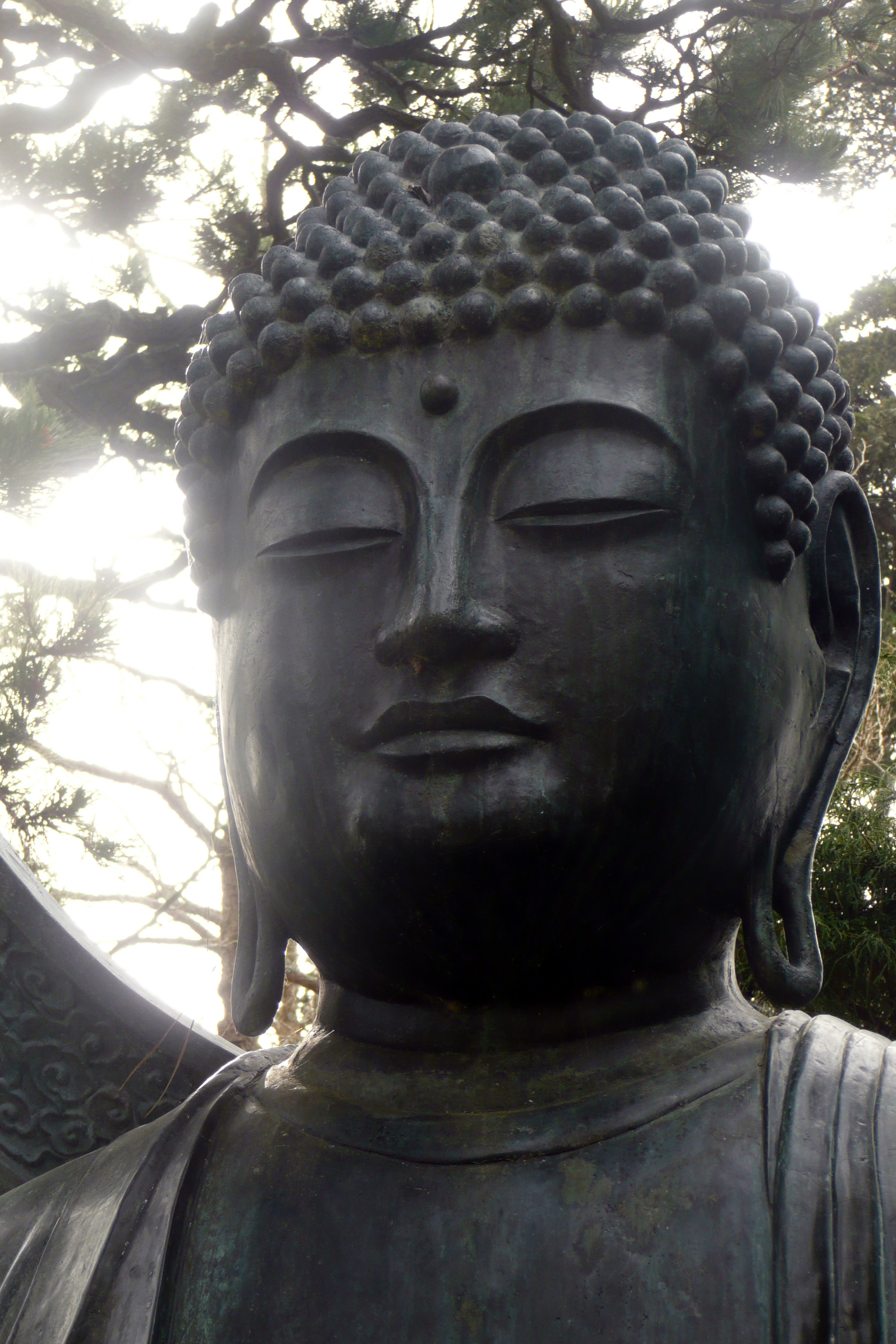

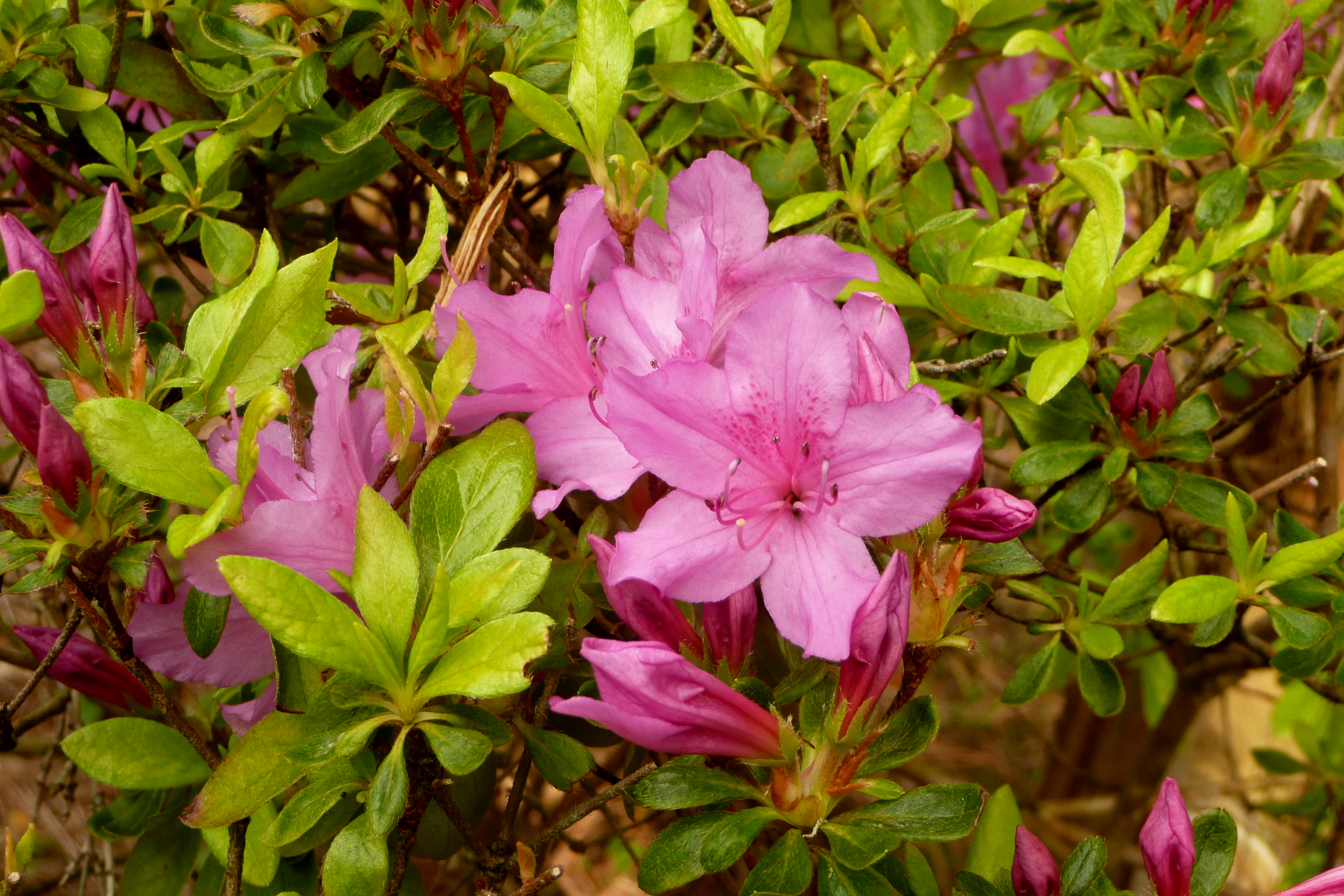

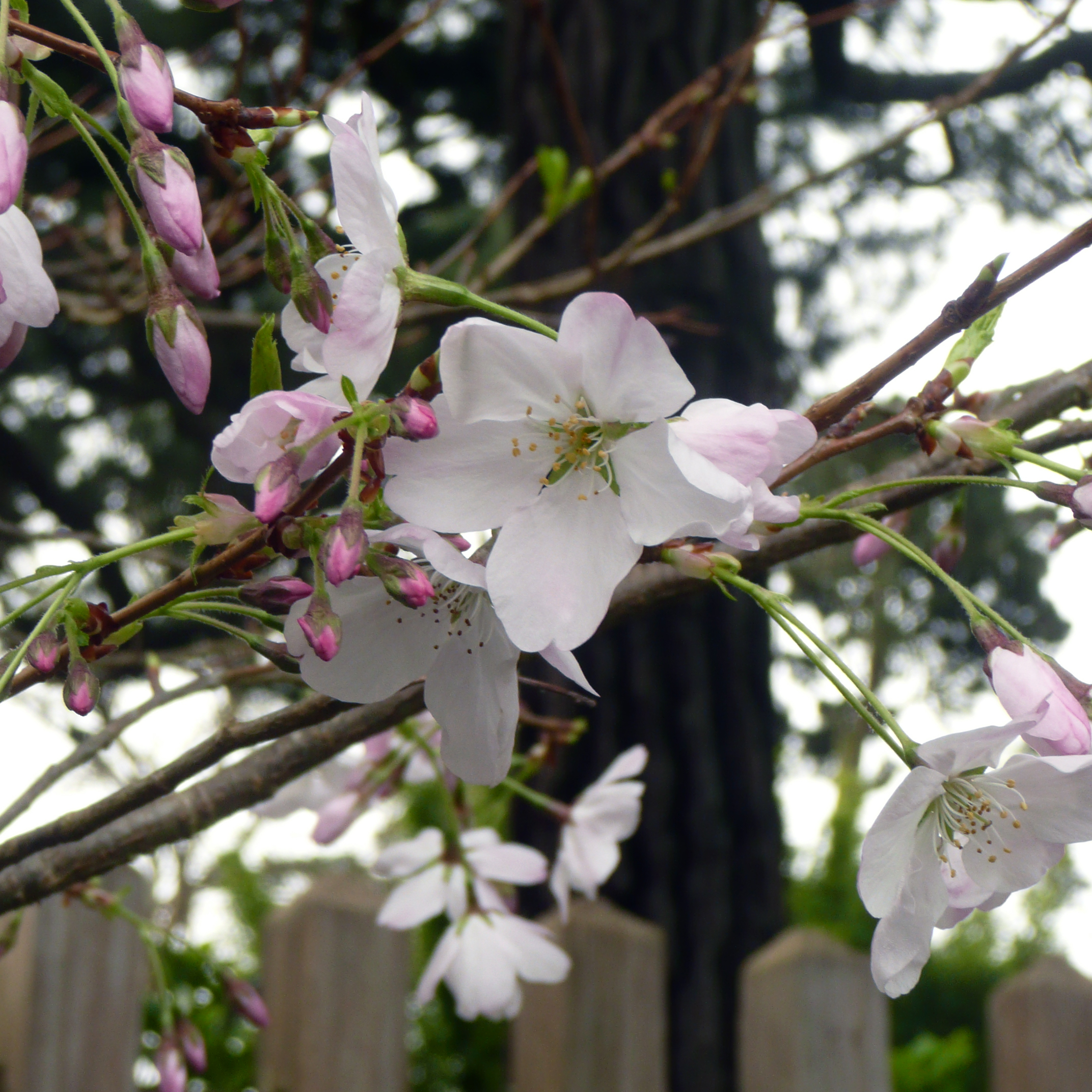

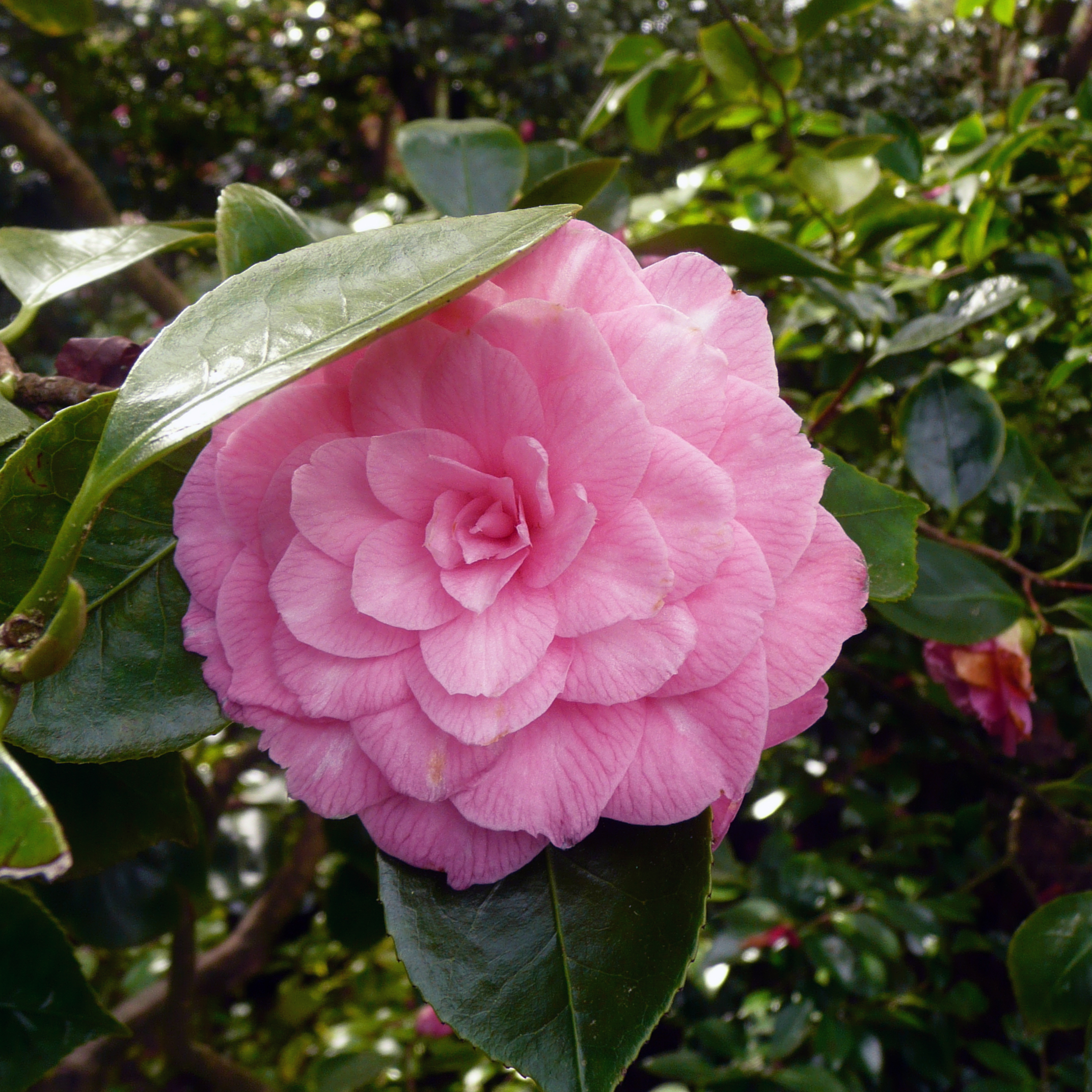

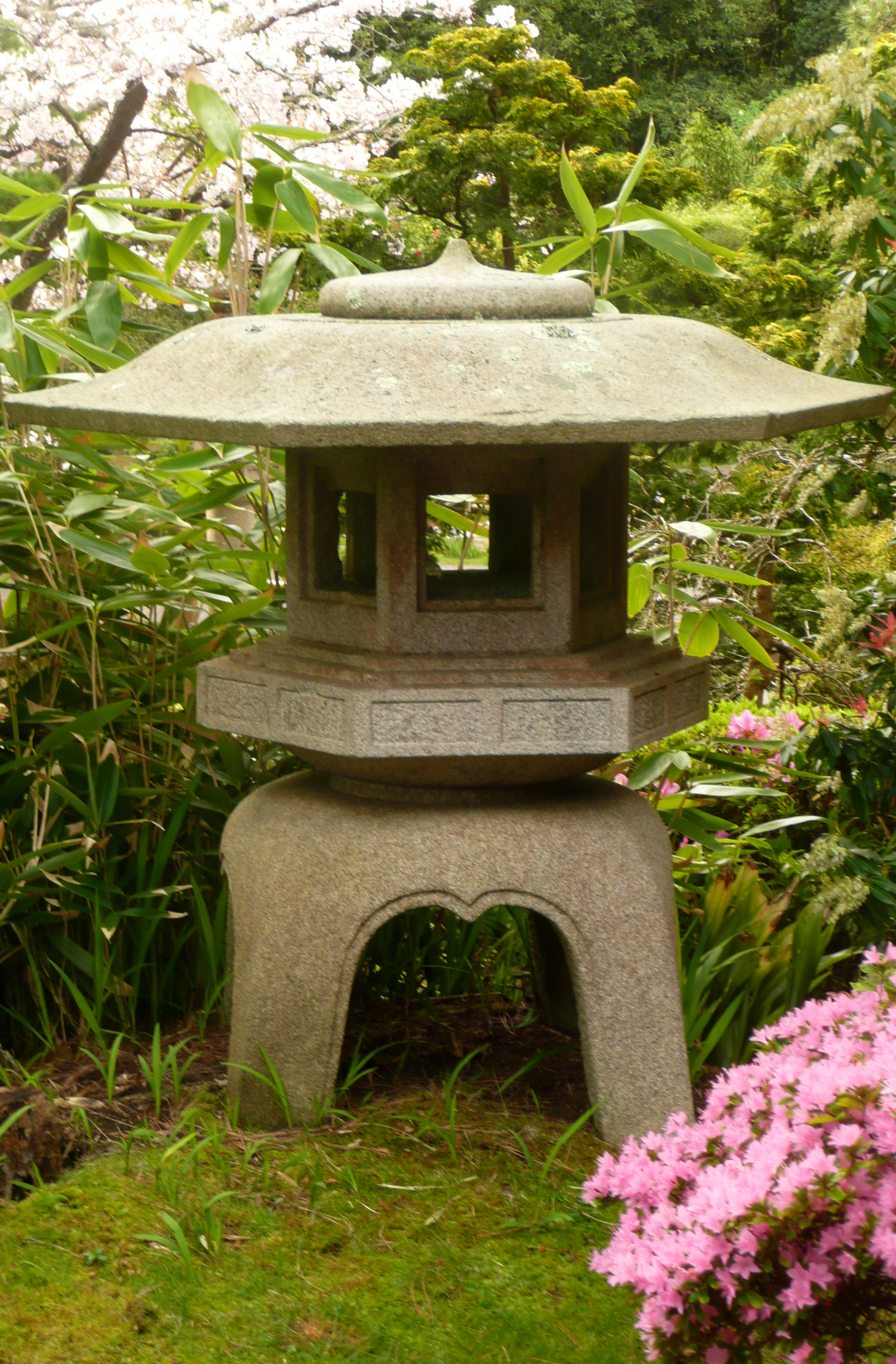

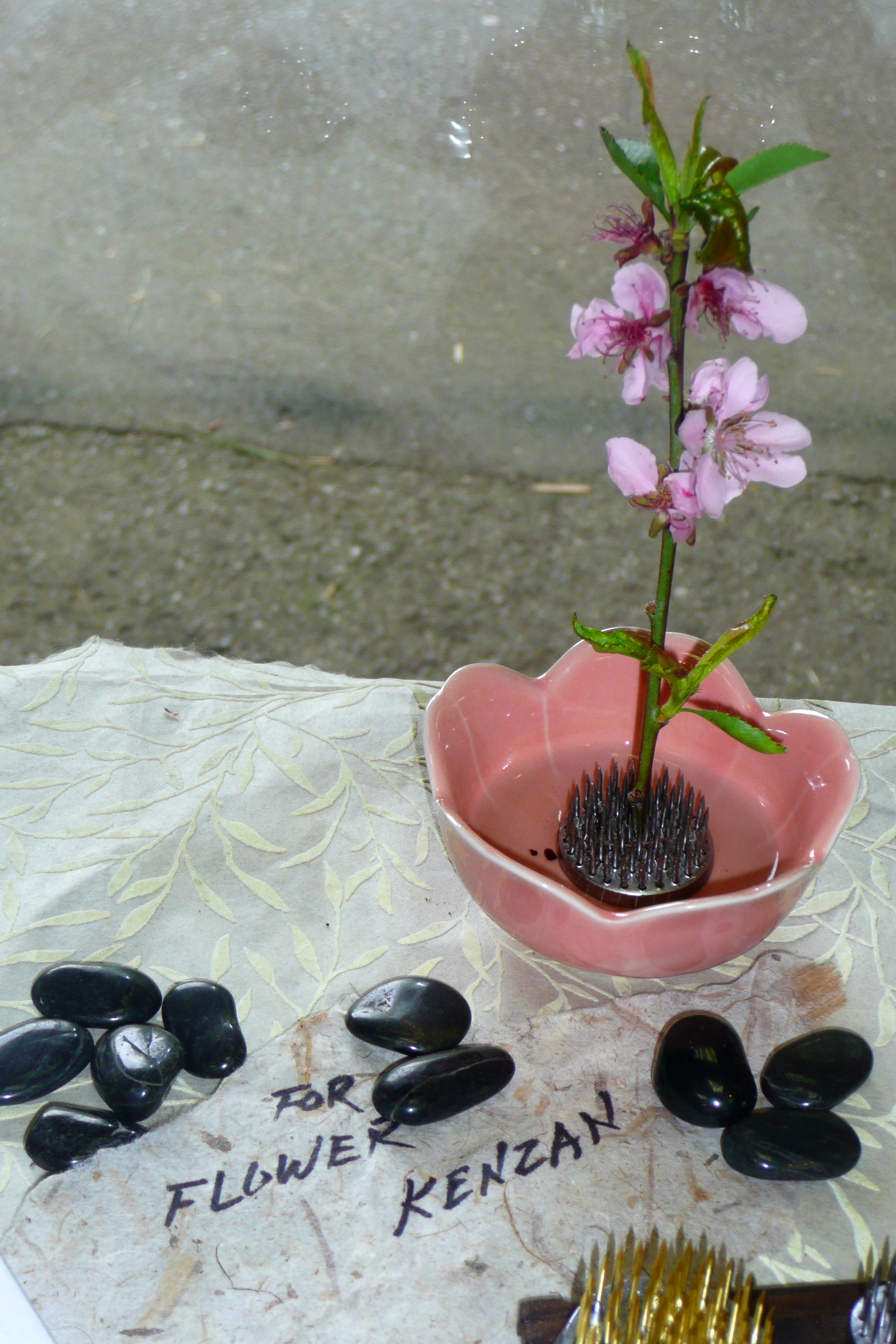

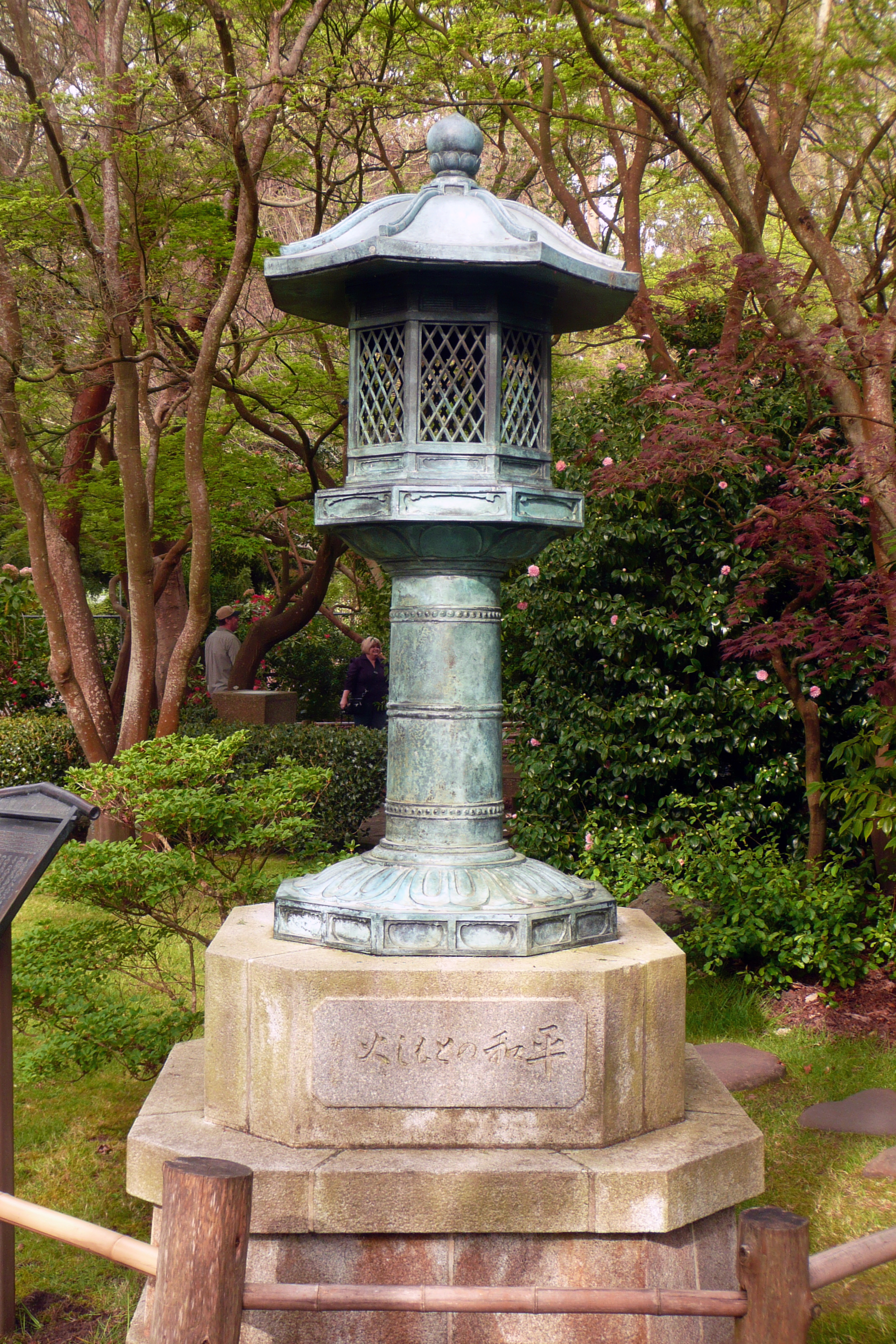

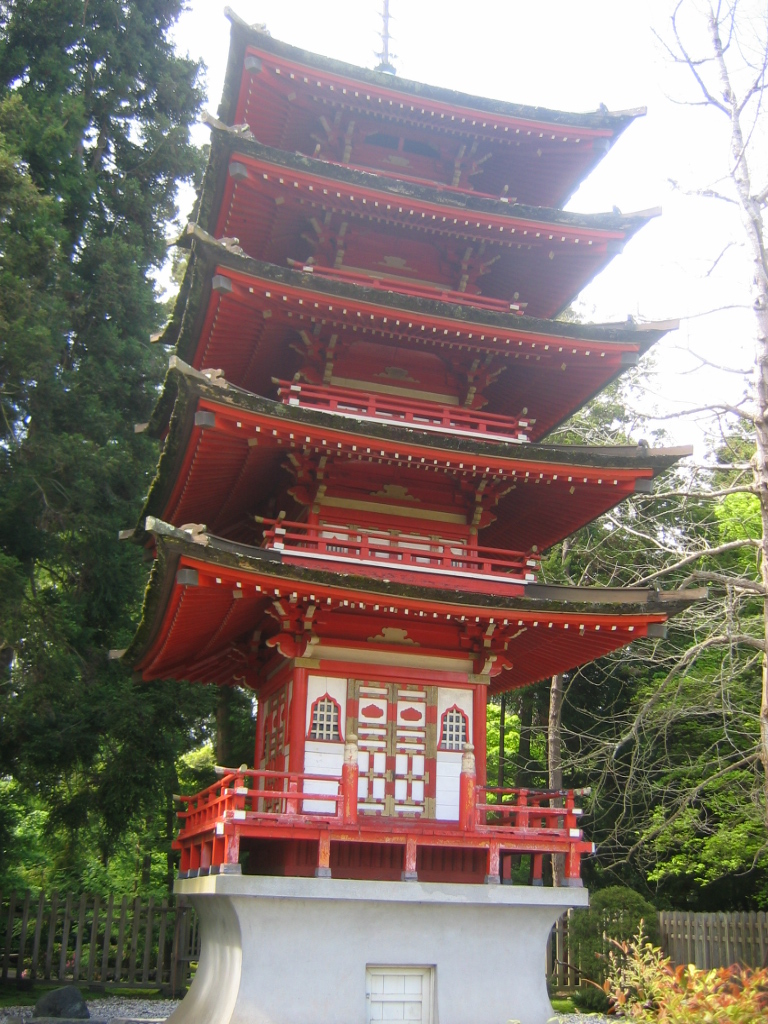
