= San Fernando High School =

Public high school in California, United States

Location
- 11133 O'Melveny Avenue; San Fernando, California 91340; United States; 34.272°N 118.443°W

Information
- Type: Public
- Established: 1896; 130 years ago
- Status: 🟩 Opened
- Locale: City, Large
- School district: Los Angeles Unified School District
- NCES District ID: 0622710
- NCES School ID: 062271003325
- Principal: Pablo Mejia
- Teaching staff: 85.94 (on an FTE basis)
- Grades: 9–12
- Enrollment: 1,608 (2024–2025)
  - Male: 866
  - Female: 742
- Student to teacher ratio: 18.71
- Colors: Black and Gold
- Mascot: Tiger
- Information: (818) 898-7920
- Website: sanfernandohs.lausd.org

San Fernando High School (SFHS) is a high school of the Los Angeles Unified School District. It is located in the Pacoima neighborhood of Los Angeles, in the northeastern San Fernando Valley, California. It is near and also serves the City of San Fernando.

== History ==
San Fernando High School—SFHS—was established in 1896, and was originally known as the San Fernando Union High School (SFUHS). It is one of the oldest high schools in the Los Angeles Unified School District. SFHS was originally located at Fifth and Hagar streets in the City of San Fernando.

In 1906, the school moved to a new campus on North Brand Boulevard. San Fernando High School moved again in 1952, to its present location.

It was in the Los Angeles City High School District until 1961, when it merged into LAUSD.

The auditorium was renamed after Cesar Chavez in a dedication ceremony on June 11, 2000, seven years after Chavez's death.

== Description ==
=== School attendance boundaries ===
Students in the City of San Fernando are assigned to the school. Originally more of the Pacoima neighborhood was zoned to the school, but much of it was reassigned to Arleta High School upon that school's opening in 2006. Students in the San Fernando Gardens public housing complex in Pacoima are still assigned to San Fernando High School.

San Fernando High School's attendance boundary changed numerous times as well as new high schools opening in the area. In the fall of 2006, 9th and 10th grade students in a portion of San Fernando High School's 2005–2006 school year zone attended Arleta High School instead of San Fernando ; Arleta will phase in grades 11 through 12 .

SFHS was further relieved of overcrowding when César Chávez Learning Academies (Valley Region High School 5) opened in 2011.

=== Demographics ===
During 2020–2021, the school had 2,044 students and 110 faculty members.

In 2000, 10% of faculty had attended San Fernando High School as students. At the time the school was actively seeking alumni to be teachers. Many of the teachers who were alumni of San Fernando High were bilingual and could offer assistance to Spanish-speaking students.

== Athletics ==
In 2013, Johnny Parada became the first ever CIF wrestling state champion from the Los Angeles City Section when he defeated Wyatt Wyckoff of Paradise High School 13-6 for the 126 lbs. title.

== Notable alumni ==
- Sev Aszkenazy, real estate developer
- Ivan Becerra, former professional soccer player
- Raul Bocanegra, California State Assemblyman
- Buddy Bradford, MLB outfielder
- Tony Cárdenas, U.S. Congressman
- Charmian Carr ‘60, actress
- Bobby Chacon, boxer
- Denny Crum, men's college basketball coach
- Anthony Davis, NFL and CFL running back
- Felipe Fuentes, former California State Assemblyman, Los Angeles City Councilmember
- Mike Glyer, Hugo-winning fanzine publisher
- Miguel Gonzalez, MLB pitcher
- John Green, basketball player
- Jack Hiatt, MLB catcher
- Barbara Lee, U.S. Congresswoman
- George Lopez, actor, comedian
- Nury Martinez, community activist, former Los Angeles City Council President
- Gary Matthews, MLB outfielder
- Natasha Melnick, actress, musician
- Cindy Montañez, former California State Assemblywoman
- Malcolm Moore, former NFL and USFL player
- Alex Padilla, U.S. Senator from California; former California Secretary of State, State Senator, and Los Angeles City Councilmember
- Rashaad Reynolds, footballer
- Monica Rodriguez, Los Angeles City Councilmember
- Herschel Curry Smith, track coach
- Ritchie Valens, singer (killed in 1959 airplane crash)
- Jacob Vargas, actor and producer
- Charles White, NFL running back, 1979 Heisman Trophy winner at USC
- Kevin Williams, former NFL and USFL player
