= Van Nuys Boulevard =

Street in Los Angeles

- Interactive map of Van Nuys Boulevard
- Namesake: Isaac Newton Van Nuys
- Maintained by: Bureau of Street Services, Los Angeles Department of Public Works
- Length: 11 mi (18 km)
- Location: Los Angeles, California
- Nearest metro station: Van Nuys
- South end: Valley Vista Blvd. in Sherman Oaks
- Major junctions: US 101; I-5; I-210
- North end: Fenton Avenue. in Lake View Terrace

Van Nuys Boulevard is a major north–south arterial road that runs through the central San Fernando Valley of Los Angeles County, California. The boulevard was notable for its cruising lifestyle that was prevalent in the 1960s and 1970s, which was depicted in the 1979 film Van Nuys Blvd.

== History ==
When Van Nuys was plotted in 1911, the main thoroughfare and its offshoots were called Sherman Way. The Pacific Electric San Fernando Line interurban railway was constructed north to San Fernando between 1911 and 1913 largely in the boulevard's median strip. As the town developed, North Sherman Way was renamed Van Nuys Boulevard as the main boulevard in the town of Van Nuys, which got its name from longtime Valley wheat farmer Isaac Newton Van Nuys. Sherman Way, named for entrepreneur and Valley developer Gen. Moses Hazeltine Sherman, originally included segments of the thoroughfares known today as Chandler and Van Nuys boulevards. Rails were removed from the street by 1981.

== Geography ==
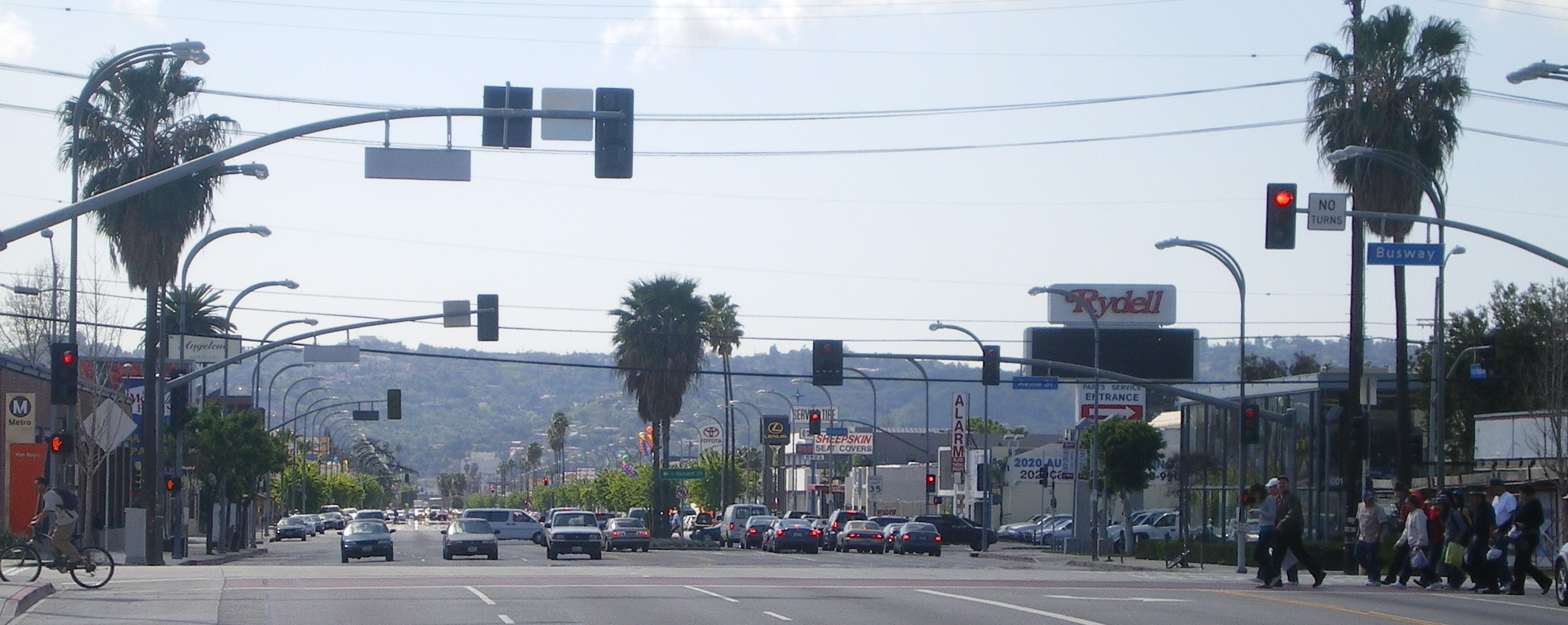
Van Nuys Boulevard at the Metro G Line crossing, 2008

Van Nuys Boulevard runs approximately eleven miles from the Santa Monica Mountains in Sherman Oaks at its southern terminus to the foothills of the western end of the San Gabriel Mountains in Lake View Terrace at its northern terminus. It passes through the community of Sherman Oaks, then continues through the community of Van Nuys, passing the numerous automobile dealerships in southern Van Nuys, then passing through the Van Nuys Municipal Center, the government center of the San Fernando Valley, then continuing north through Panorama City, past the old General Motors plant now converted into a shopping plaza called “The Plant,” before veering north east through the communities of Arleta and Pacoima, passing the San Fernando Gardens housing project, and ending in the foothills of the San Gabriel Mountains.

With its wide expanse through the heart of the San Fernando Valley, Van Nuys Boulevard became known from the 1950s through the 1970s as a center of teenage cruising. Its car culture was celebrated in several motion pictures, including Van Nuys Boulevard. Cruising became a thing of the past as police cracked down on the practice, but the car culture still lives on through the numerous automobile dealerships that line both sides of Van Nuys Boulevard in northern Sherman Oaks and southern Van Nuys.

Van Nuys Boulevard has several bus routes running on it, including two Metro routes with heavy ridership, Metro Rapid line 761 and Metro Local line 233. Van Nuys is currently the only arterial bus corridor in the San Fernando Valley running New Flyer XN60 articulated buses for both lines (previously operated by NABI 60-BRT buses). The Metro G Line has a station at Van Nuys. Further to the north, there is a Metrolink and Amtrak station. In the first half of the 20th century, Pacific Electric interurban trains ran in the median of Van Nuys Boulevard from Chandler Boulevard to Parthenia Street, which would then continue to Sepulveda Boulevard; traces of this route can be seen in the large medians of the streets the tracks used to run on.

Metro is currently proposing a light rail line from the G Line station to San Fernando along Van Nuys Boulevard as part of the East San Fernando Valley Light Rail Transit Project. Additionally, Metro plans to have a line through the Sepulveda Transit Corridor terminate at the Van Nuys Boulevard Metrolink station, with one proposed route also including two additional stops on Van Nuys Boulevard.

=== Communities ===
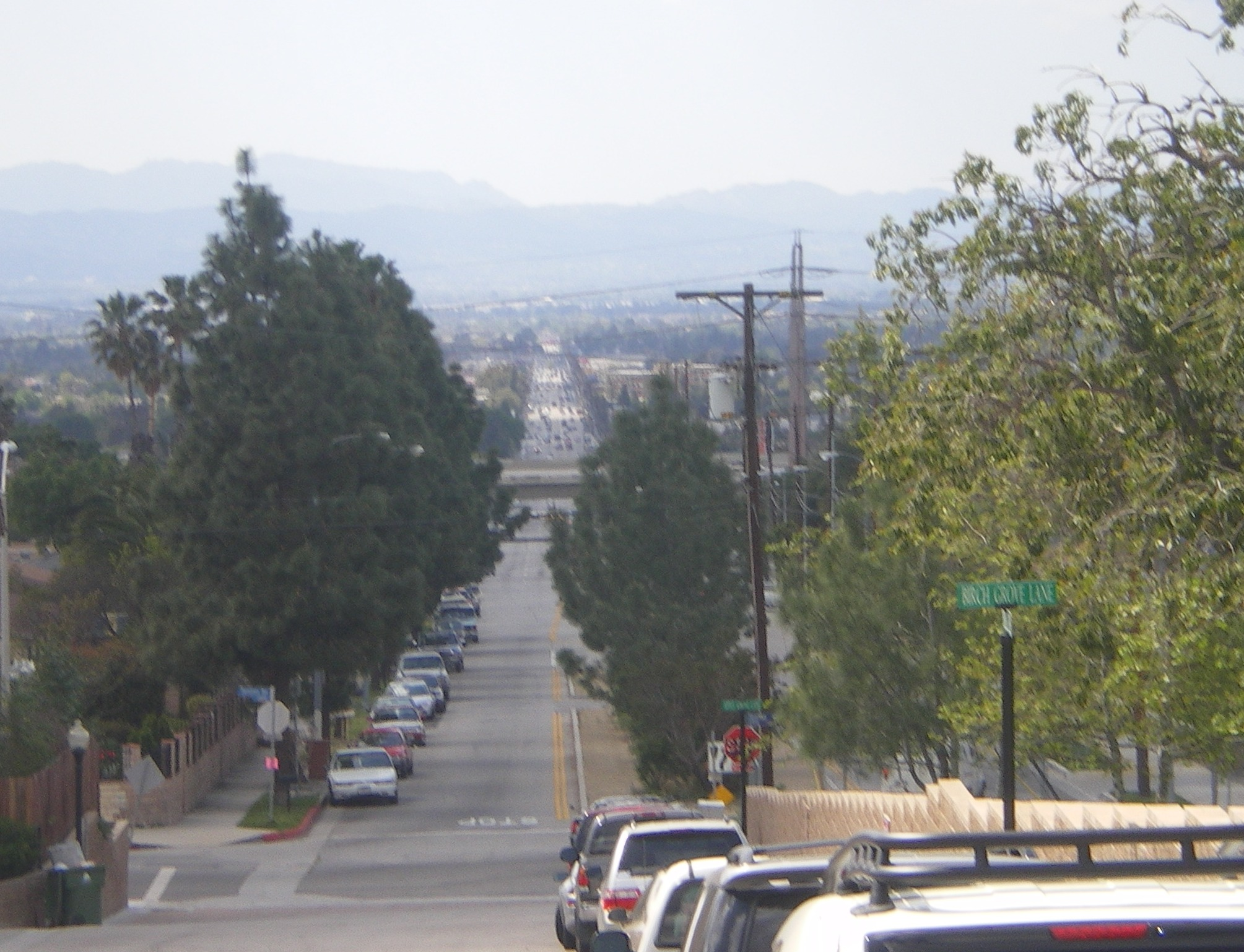
Looking south from Lake View Terrace

Van Nuys Boulevard travels through (from south to north):

- Sherman Oaks - south of Oxnard Boulevard; population 28,601 (78.6% White (not Hispanic); 8.5% Hispanic; 5.4% Asian)
- Van Nuys – between Oxnard Boulevard and Roscoe Boulevard; population 136,443 (50.3% Hispanic; 34.1% White (not Hispanic); 6.5% Asian; 5.9% African-American)
- Panorama City - between Roscoe Boulevard and Woodman Avenue; population 65,235 (70.1% Hispanic; 11.6% Asian; 11.9% White (not Hispanic)
- Arleta – between Woodman Avenue and I-5; population 32,092 (71.4% Hispanic; 13.4% White (not Hispanic); 11.7% Asian)
- Pacoima - between I-5 and Foothill Boulevard; population 58,908 (89.2% Hispanic; 5.2% African-American)
- Lake View Terrace – northeast of Foothill Boulevard; population 30,759 (58.6% Hispanic; 19.7% White (not Hispanic); 15.3% African-American; 4.8% Asian)

=== Landmarks ===
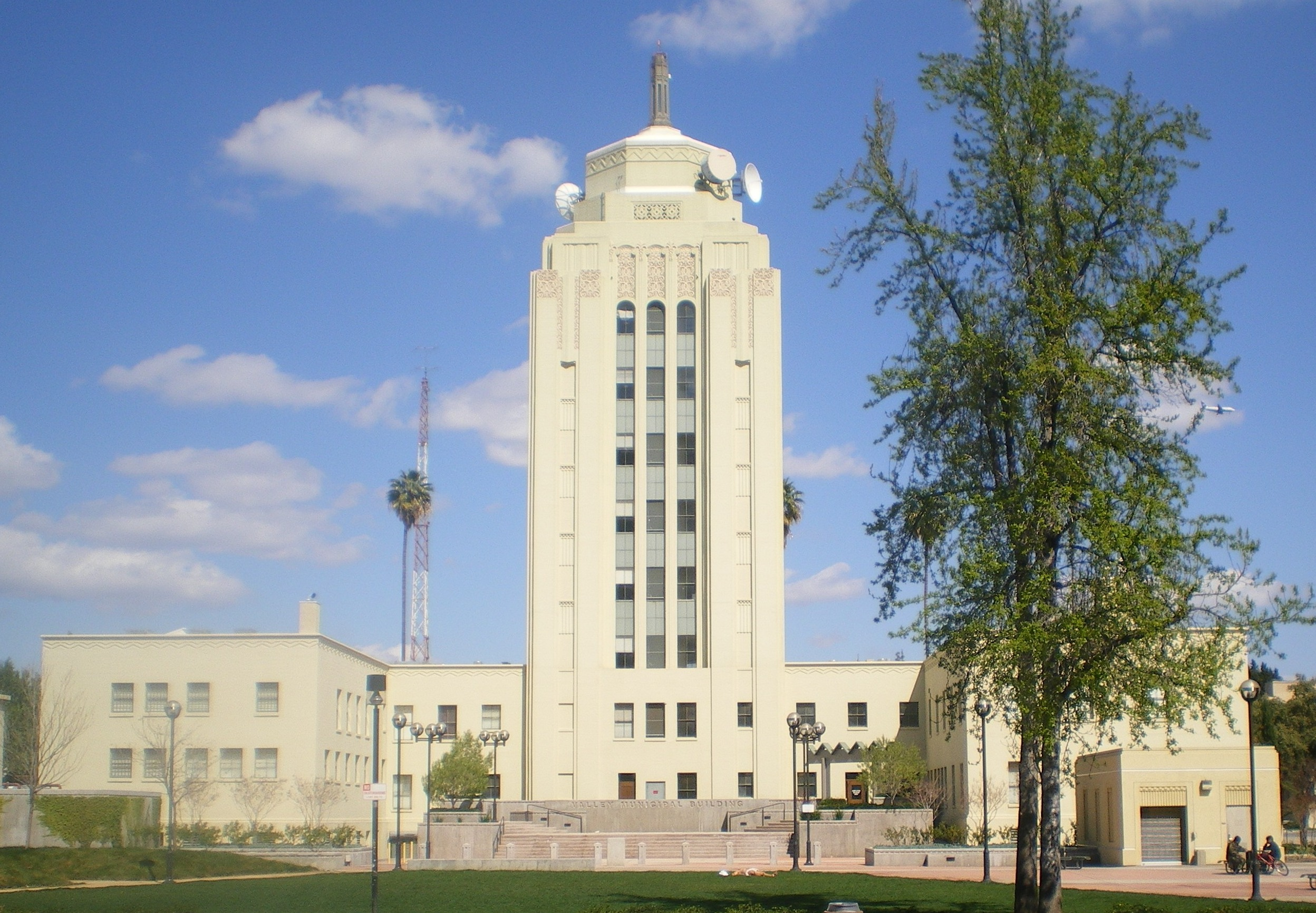
Valley Municipal Building

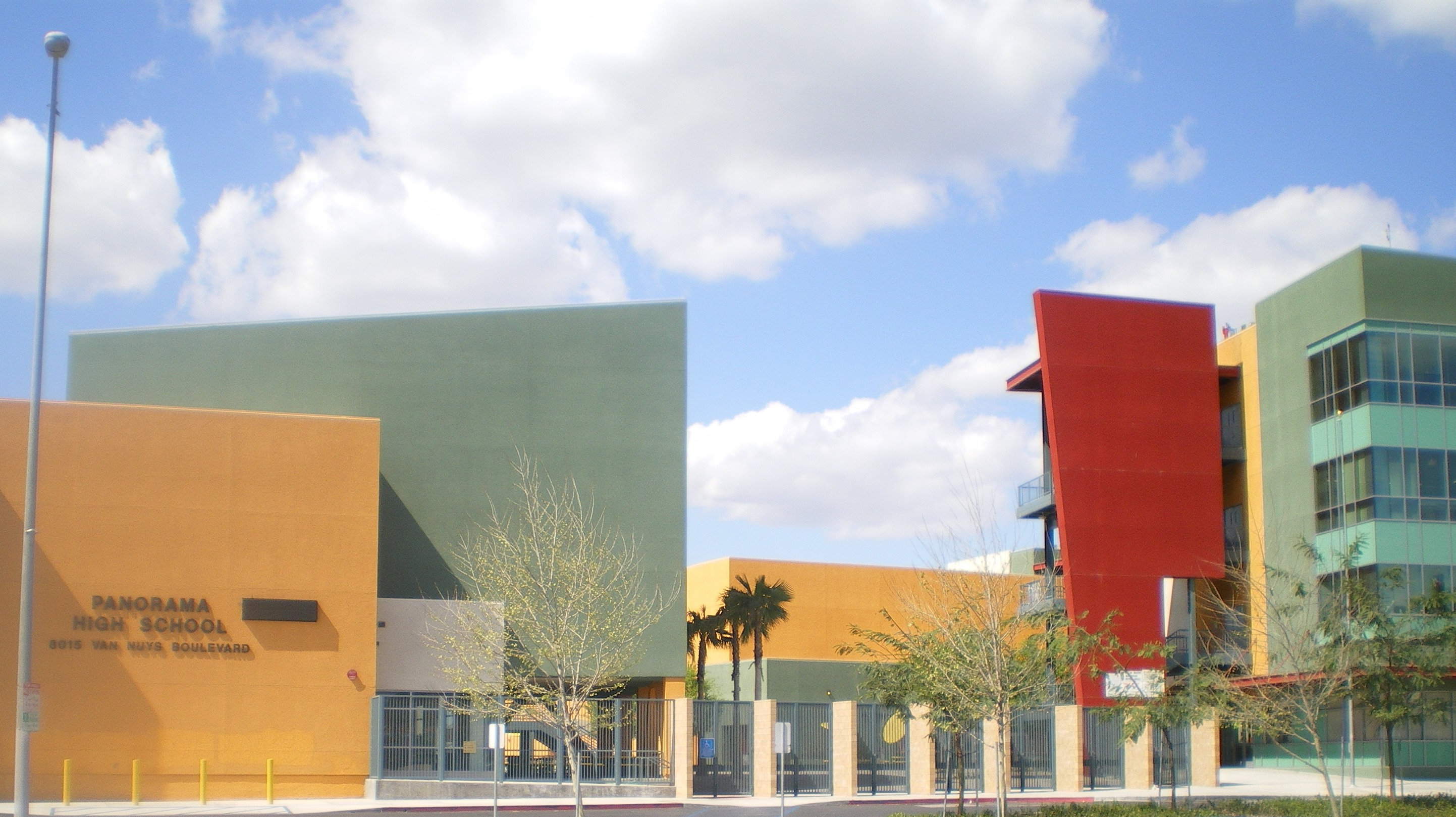
Panorama High School

Landmarks on Van Nuys Boulevard include (from south to north):

- The Village at Sherman Oaks - The Village at Sherman Oaks is the name given to the shopping and dining area surrounding the intersection of Ventura Boulevard and Van Nuys Boulevard.
- Sherman Oaks Hospital and Grossman Burn Center - Sherman Oaks Hospital is a 153-bed acute care facility on Van Nuys Boulevard in Sherman Oaks. The facility is owned and operated by Prime Healthcare Services, Inc. The Grossman Burn Center, founded by Dr. A. Richard Grossman, at Sherman Oaks Hospital has provided specialized and targeted care to burn patients since 1969. It has grown over the years from two dedicated beds to a 30-bed burn center. In 2007, the Grossman Burn Center treated a 4-year-old Iraqi boy named Youssif who was doused with gasoline and set on fire in Baghdad.
- Van Nuys Government Center - The principal government offices for the San Fernando Valley are located in the Van Nuys Government Center on Van Nuys Boulevard. The area includes the Valley Municipal Building, the modern Van Nuys Courthouse designed by Dan Dworsky, the James C. Corman Federal Building, the Van Nuys Branch of the Los Angeles Public Library, and the Marvin Braude San Fernando Valley Constituent Services Center. The Van Nuys Municipal Court building in Van Nuys, California was designed by architect Dan Dworsky and received the Kaufman & Broad Award for Outstanding New Public or Civic Project for the design. The federal building in Van Nuys was renamed the James C. Corman Federal Building in 2001 in honor of James C. Corman who represented the San Fernando Valley’s 21st Congressional District from 1961-1981. The $34 million Marvin Braude Constituent Services Center was originally proposed by Marvin Braude; it opened in 2003 and houses various city services.
- Valley Municipal Building - Constructed in 1932 and designed by Peter K. Schabarum, the Valley Municipal Building (sometimes called Van Nuys City Hall) is a San Fernando Valley landmark and is considered a good example of the WPA-era "Zig-Zag Moderne" architectural styling. It was designed as a smaller version of the 29-story Los Angeles City Hall.
- The Plant – A shopping center built on the site of the old General Motors Van Nuys plant.
- Panorama High School - A high school in the Los Angeles Unified School District located on Van Nuys Boulevard across from The Plant shopping center.
- Panorama Mall
- Arleta High School - A high school in the Los Angeles Unified School District located on Van Nuys Boulevard in Arleta.
- Pacoima Branch Library - A branch of the Los Angeles Public Library
- Mural Mile - A section of Van Nuys Boulevard in Pacoima where artists, led by Levi Ponce in 2011, have painted large murals on walls facing the street.
- San Fernando Gardens - A sprawling housing project in Pacoima built during World War II to house workers at the nearby Lockheed aerospace manufacturing facilities in Burbank. The project was racially integrated; its wartime black population was the first significant African-American population in the San Fernando Valley. The San Fernando Gardens contains 448 units and 1,621 residents, 48% of whom are under the age of 18. The average annual income is $18,000, more than 45% less than the Los Angeles median family income.
- Pacoima Charter School - An elementary school

== Gallery ==
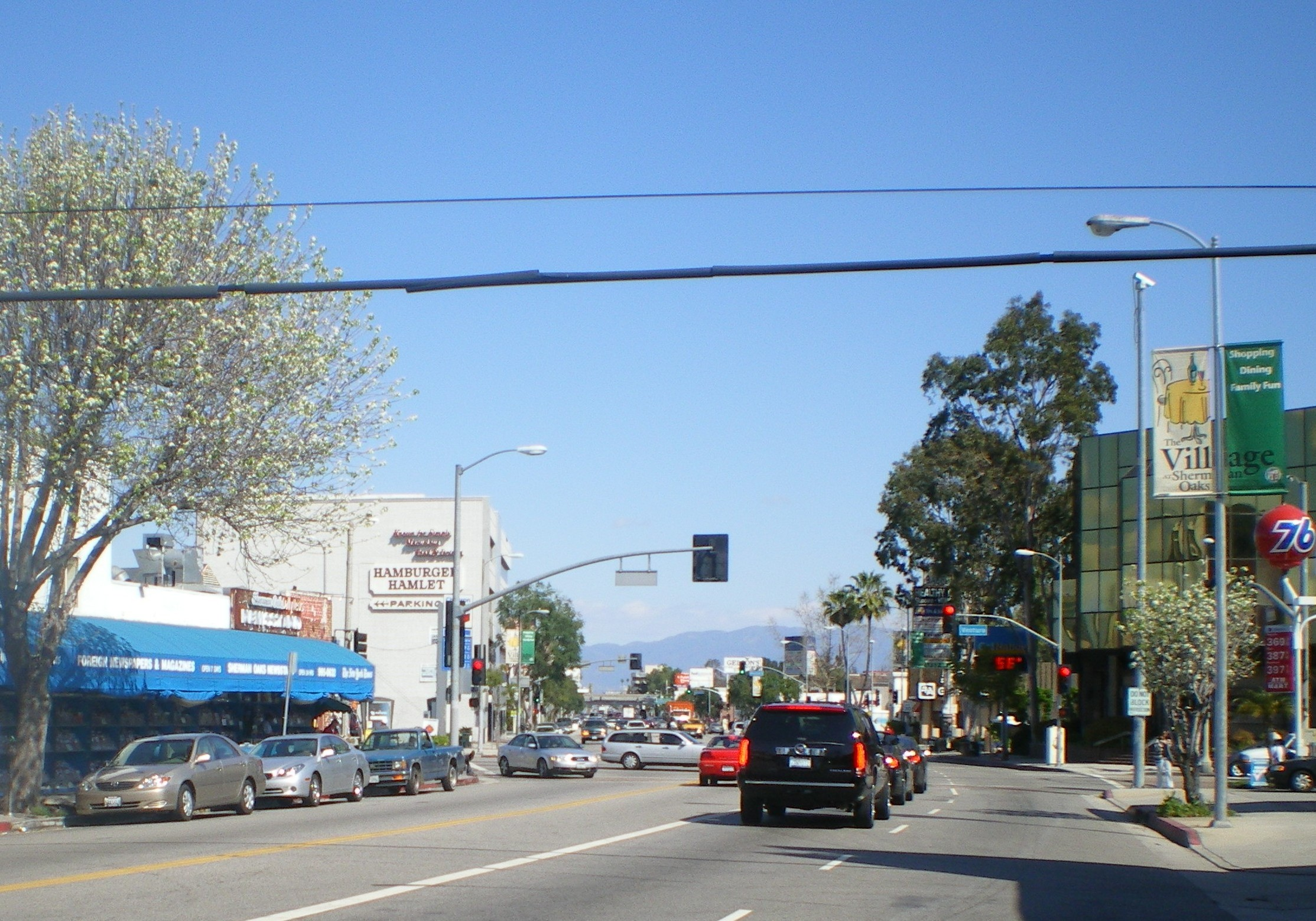
The Village at Sherman Oaks

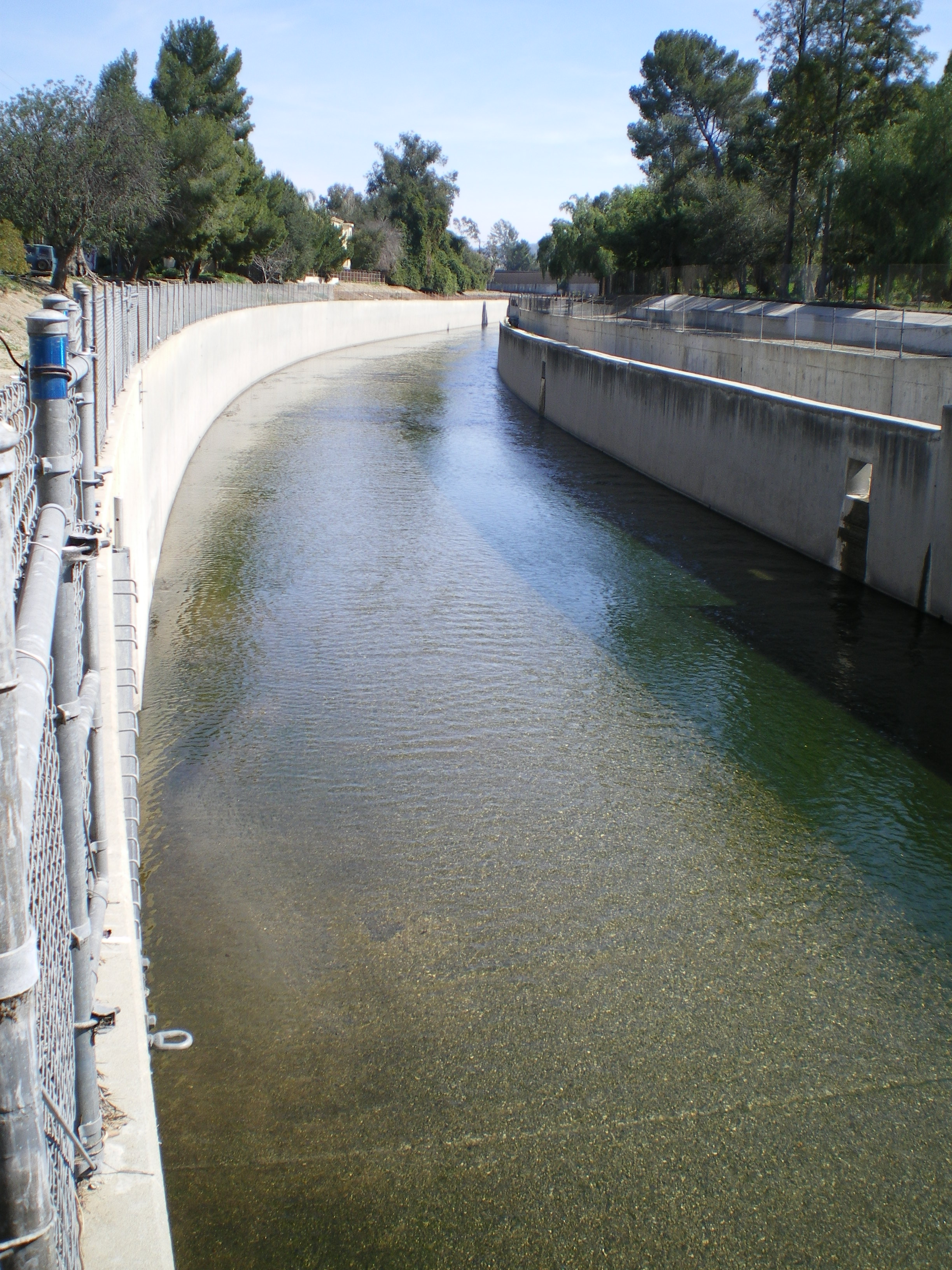
Los Angeles River at Van Nuys Blvd.

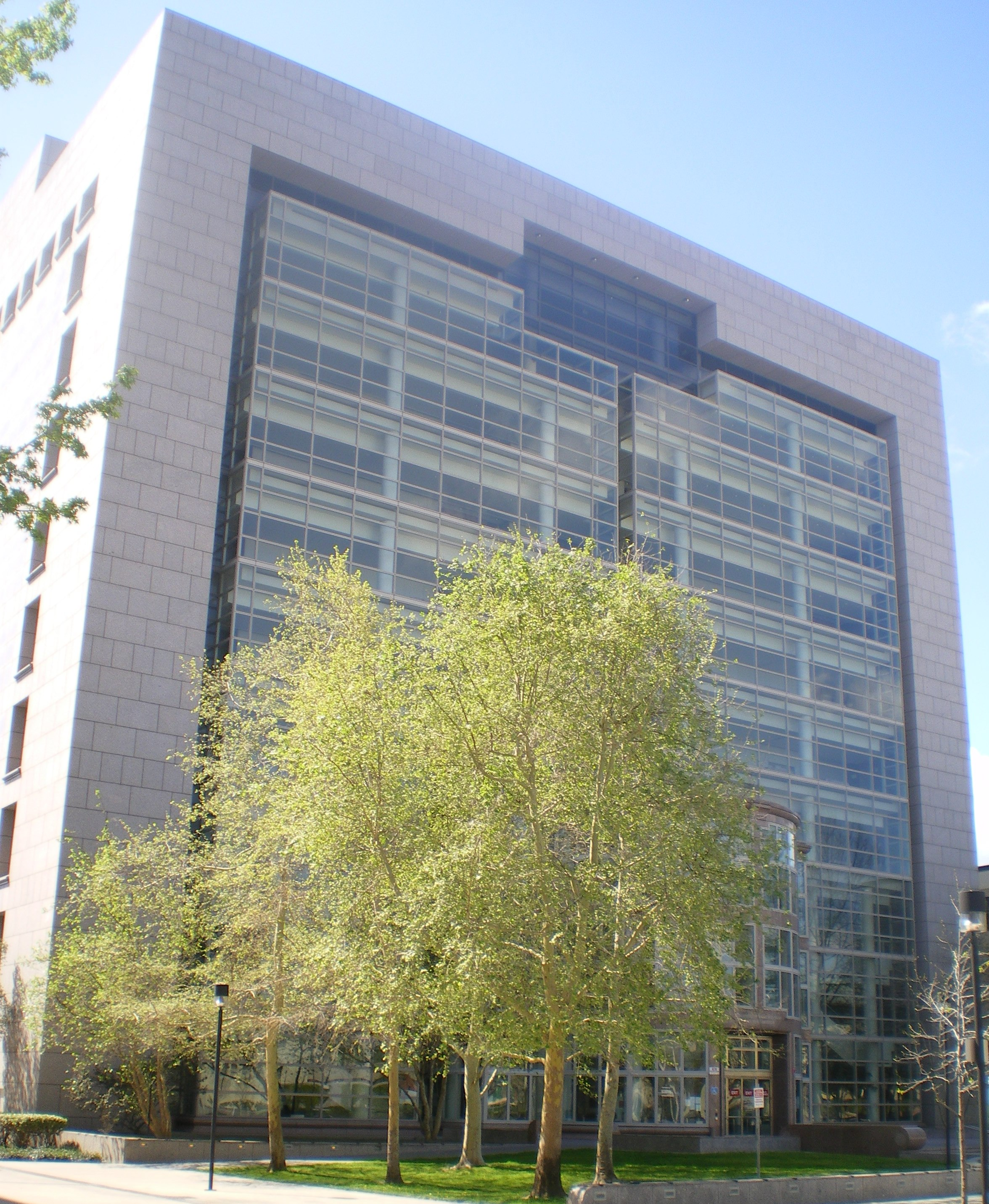
Van Nuys Courthouse

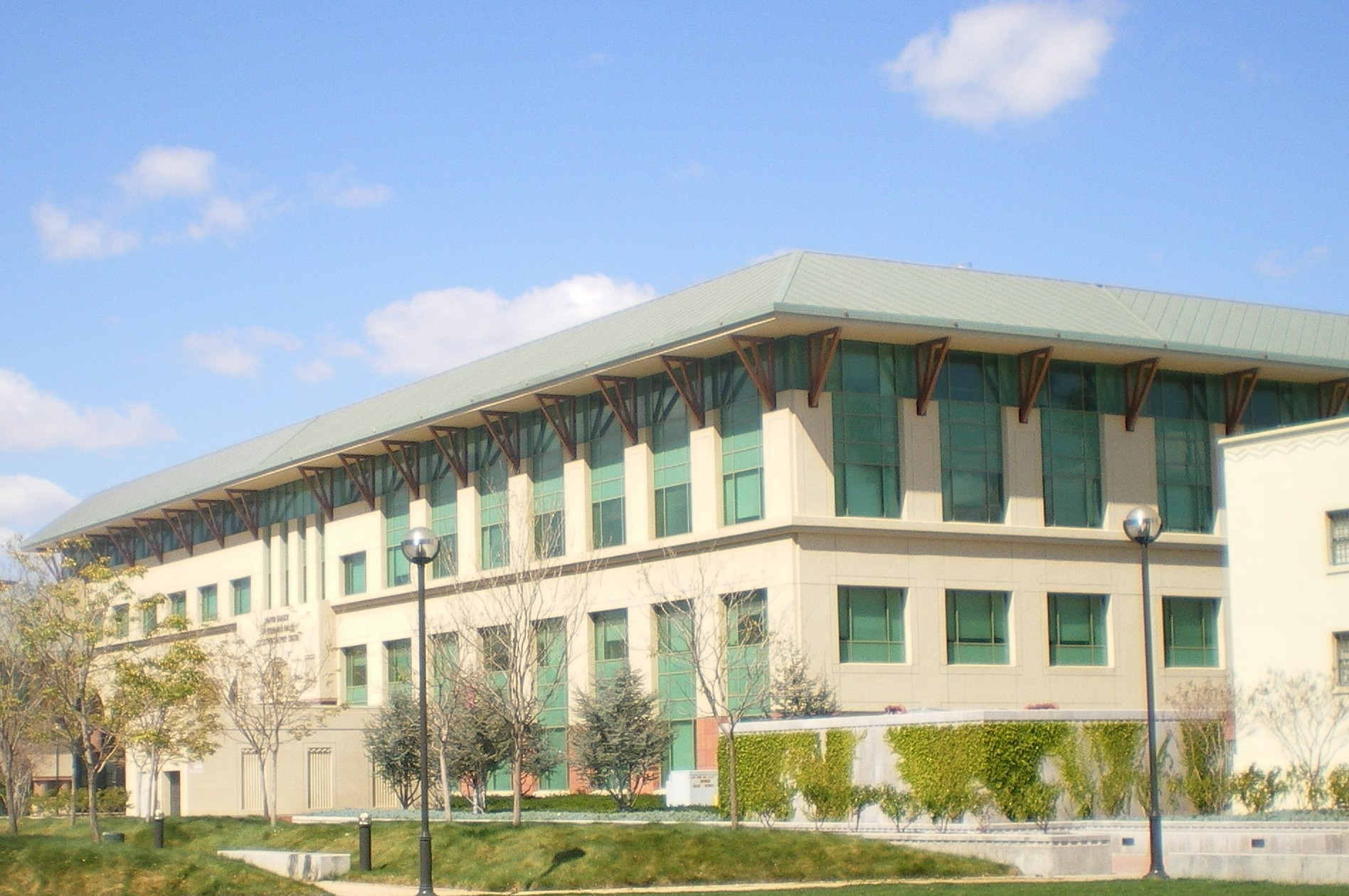
Braude Constituent Service Center

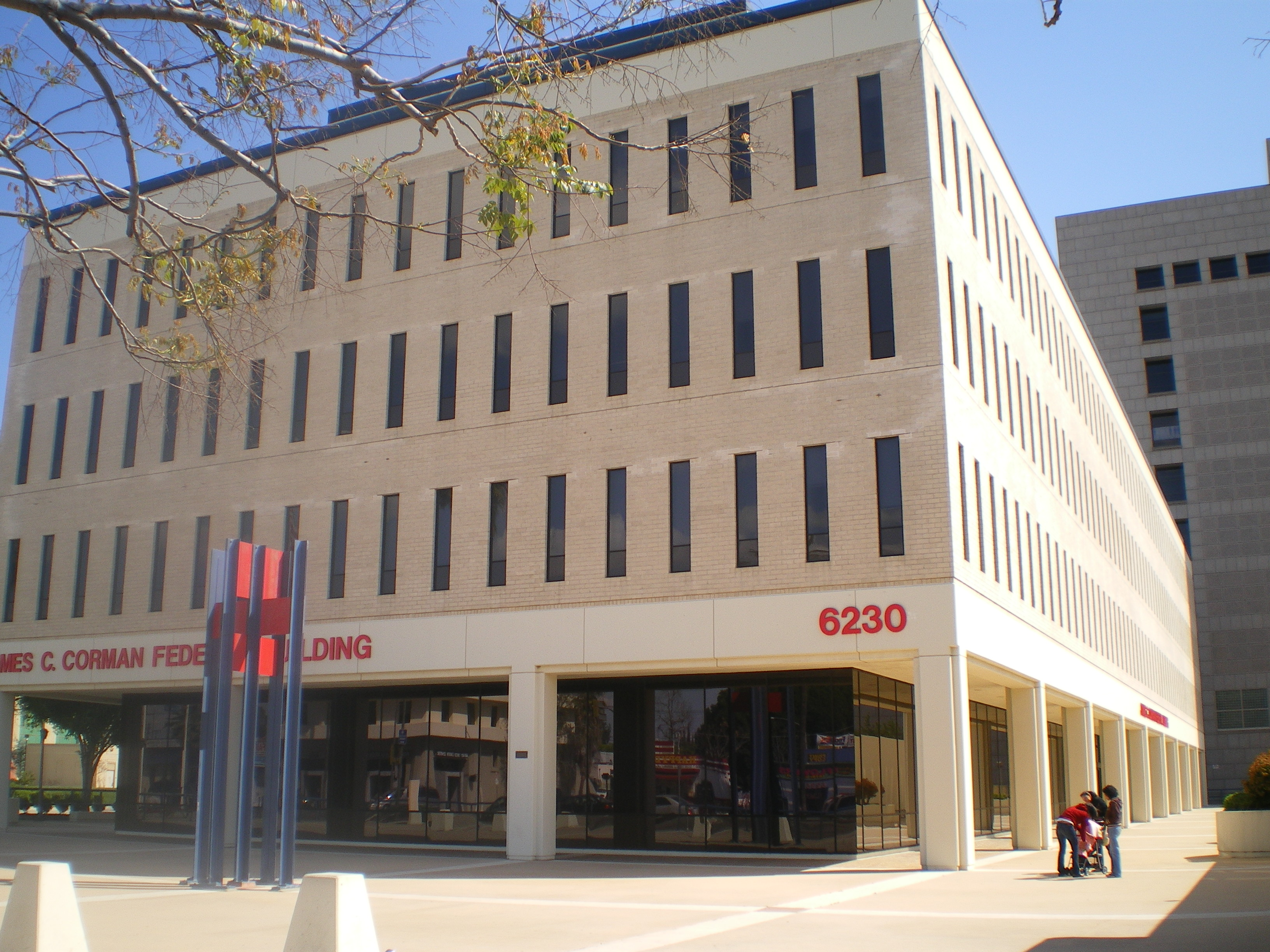
James C. Corman Federal Building

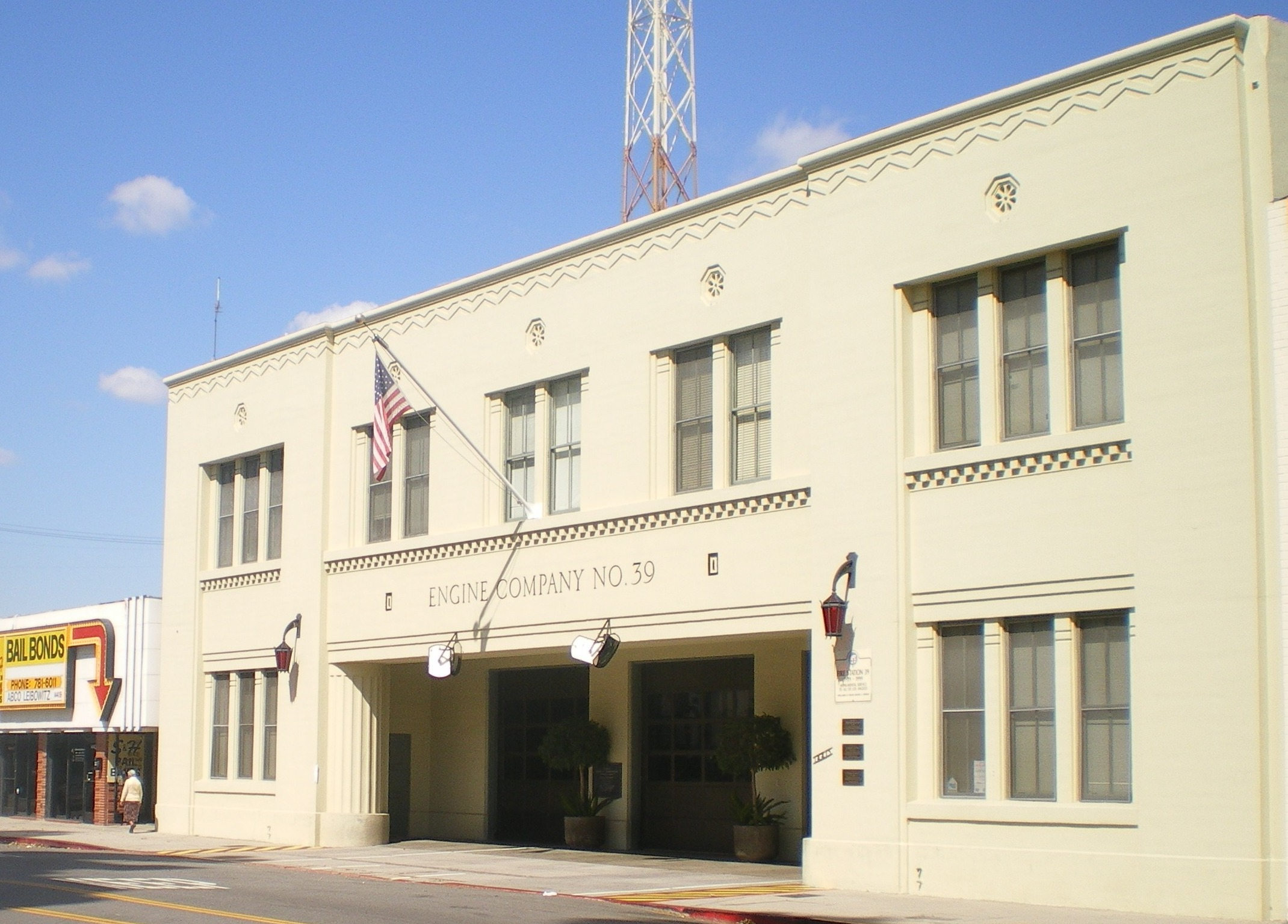
LA Engine Company No. 39

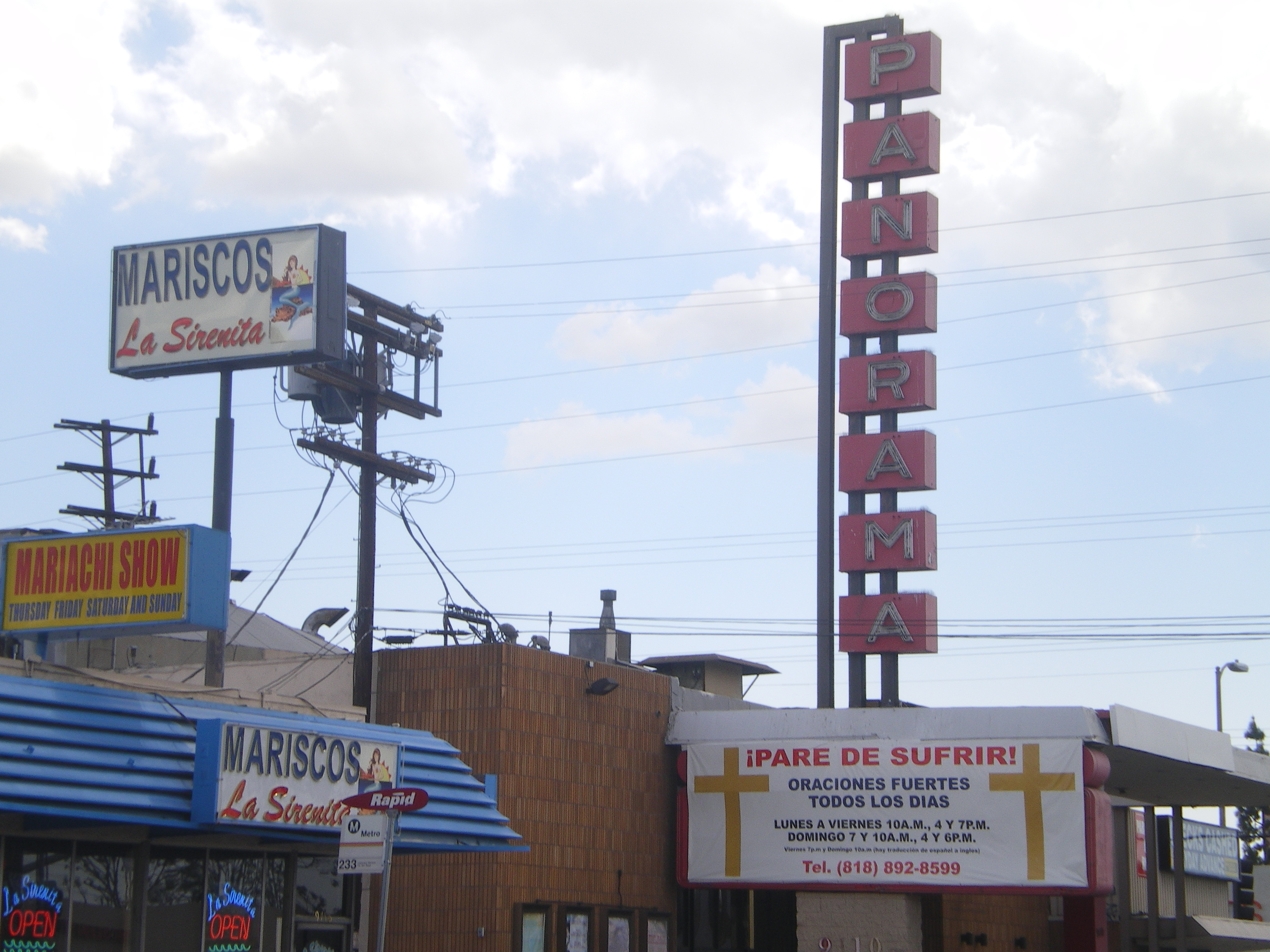
Panorama Theater Converted into Church

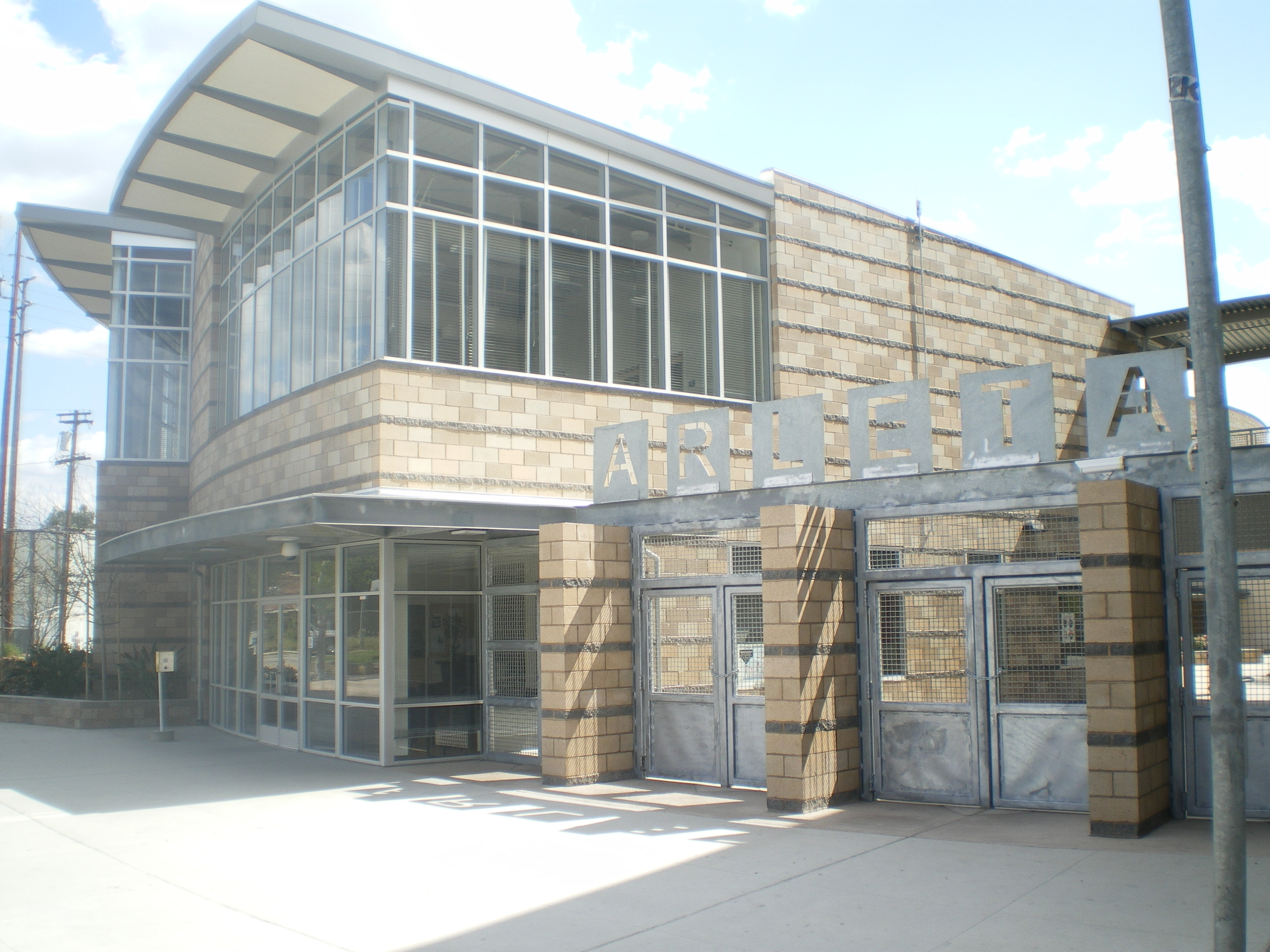
Arleta High School

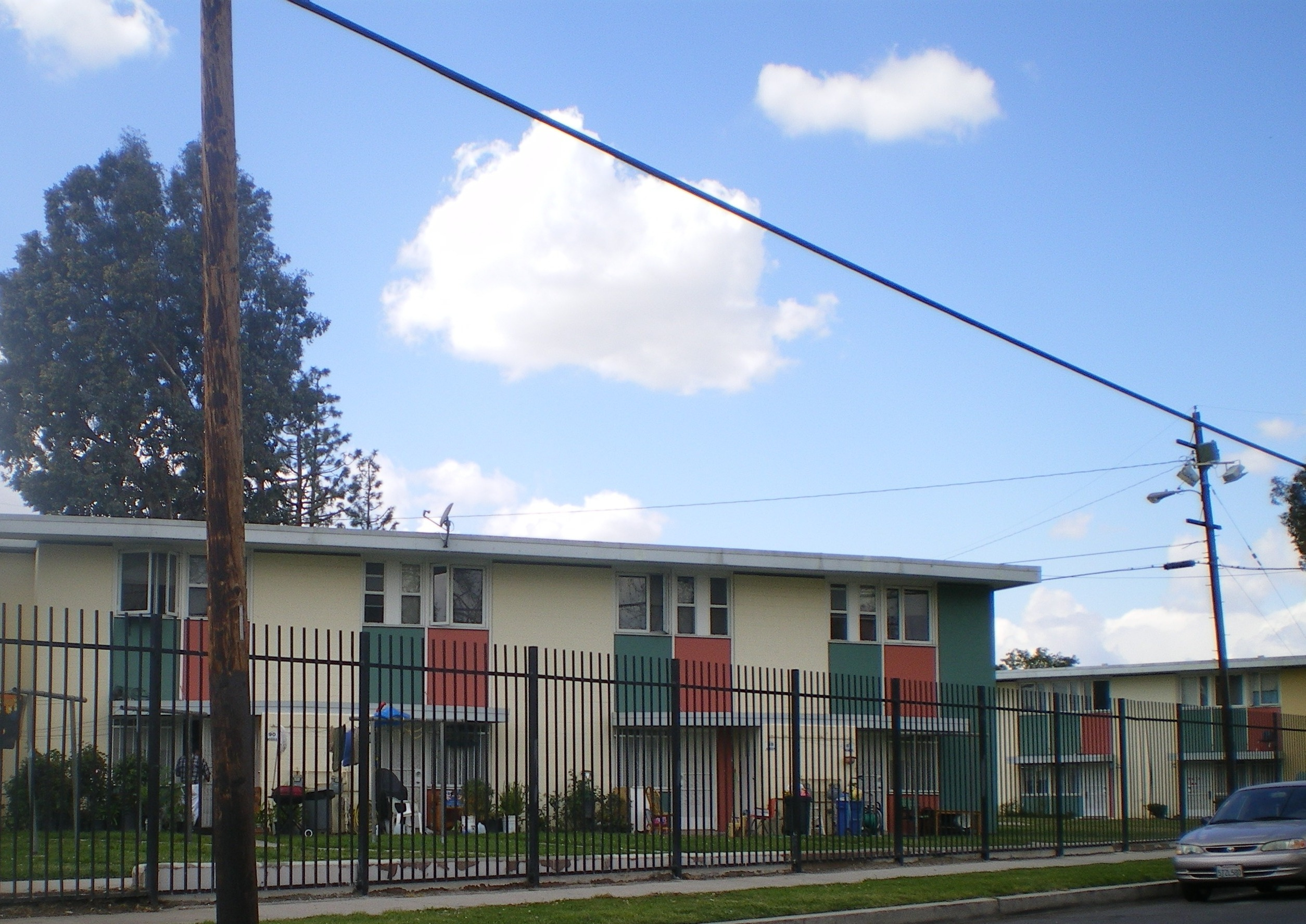
San Fernando Gardens

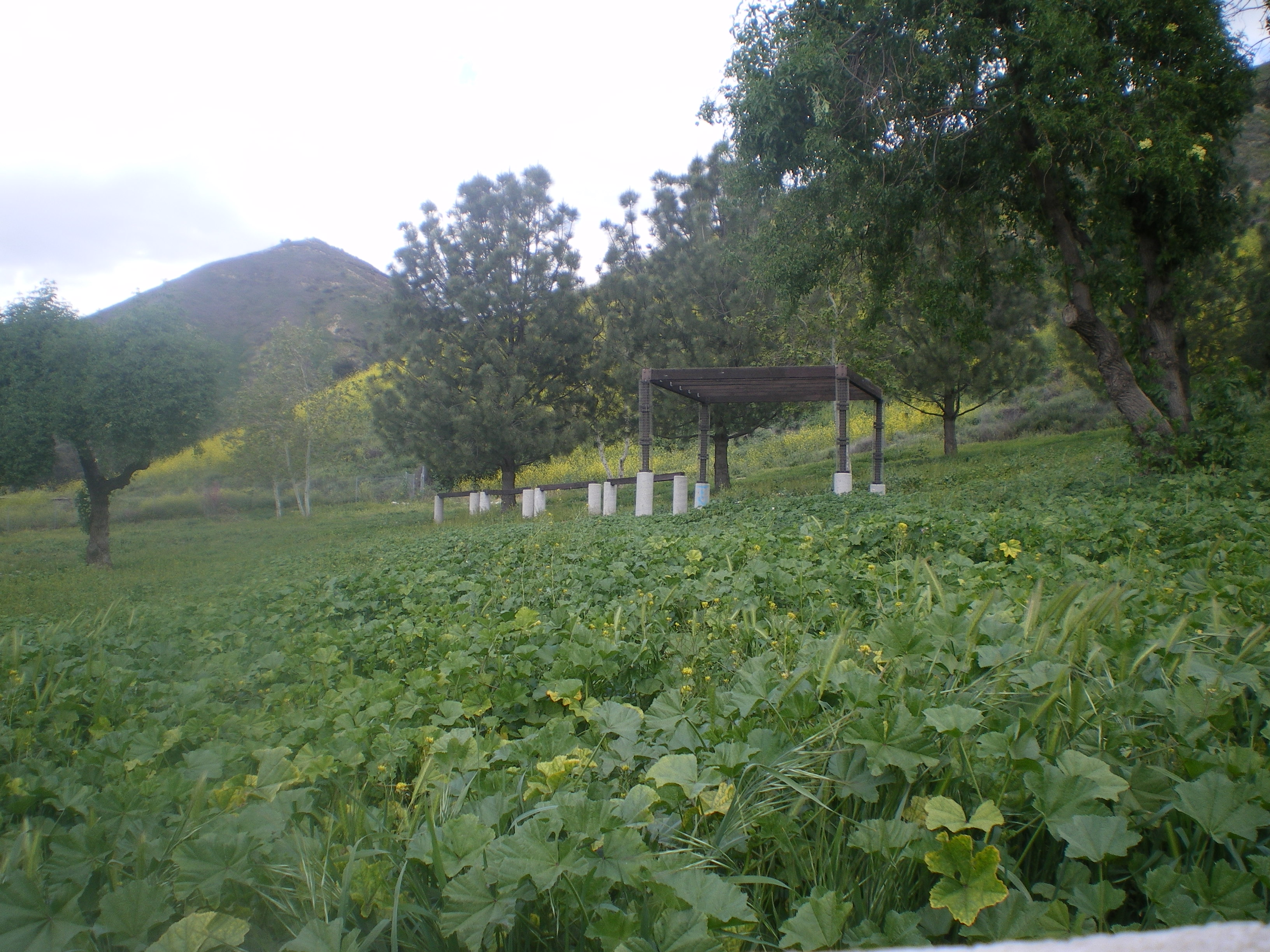
Foothills at North Terminus

== See also ==
- Van Nuys station (Los Angeles Metro)
