= Mission Hills, Los Angeles =

Mission Hills
- Neighborhood of Los Angeles
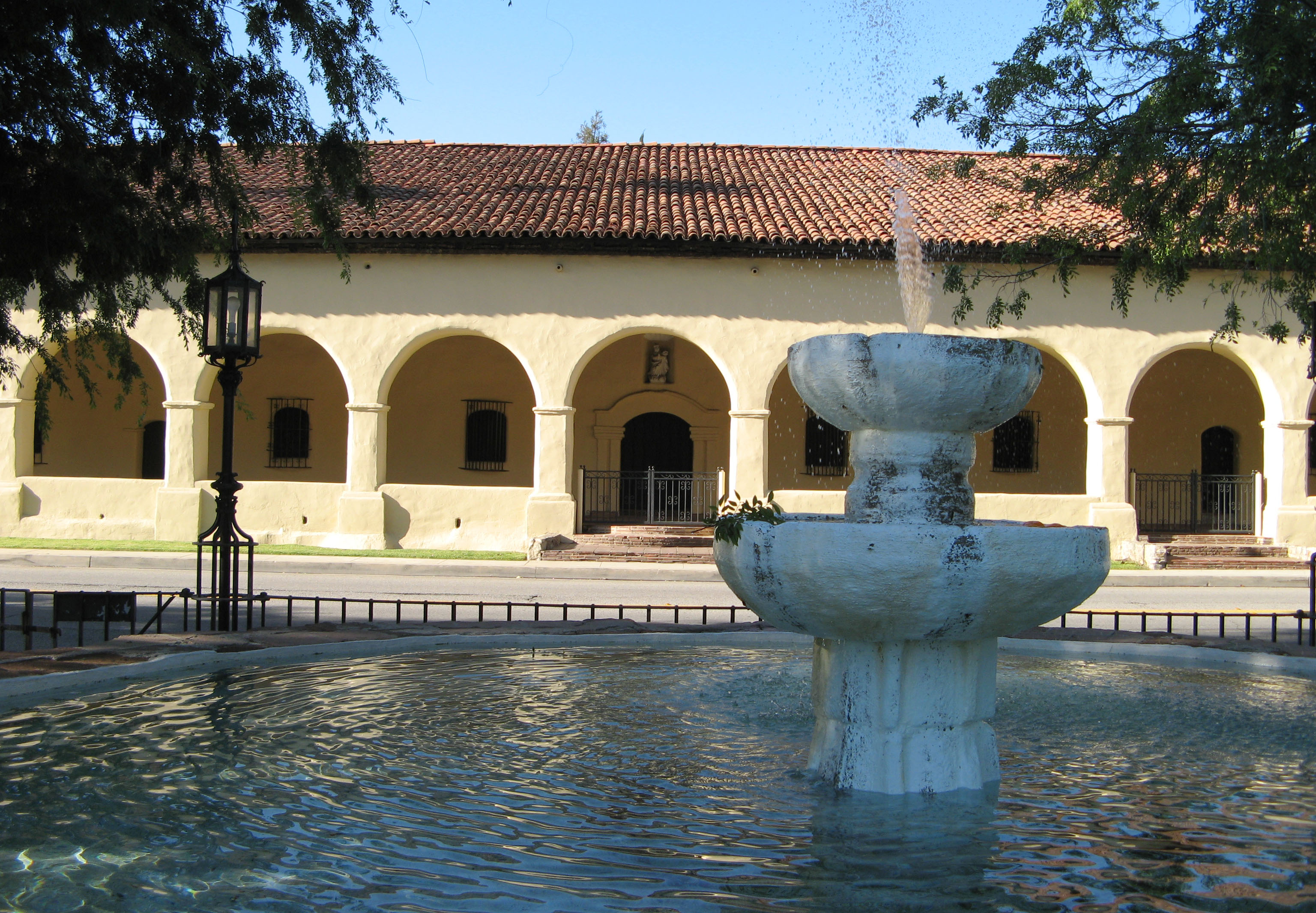
- Mission San Fernando Rey de España

- Location within Los Angeles/San Fernando Valley Mission Hills (the Los Angeles metropolitan area)
- Coordinates: 34°15′26″N 118°28′02″W
- Country: United States
- State: California
- County: Los Angeles
- City: Los Angeles
- Named for: Mission San Fernando Rey de España
- Elevation: 913 ft (278 m)

Population (2022)
  - Total: 22,180
- Time zone: UTC−8 (PST)
  - Summer (DST): UTC−7 (PDT)
- ZIP Code: 91345
- Area codes: 747 and 818

Mission Hills is a neighborhood in the San Fernando Valley region of Los Angeles, California.

Starting as the agricultural community of Hickson and later the residential neighborhood of Dennis Park, Mission Hills was named in the 1950s for the Spanish Mission San Fernando Rey de España. The neighborhood includes the Andrés Pico Adobe, the second-oldest residence still standing in Los Angeles. The San Fernando Mission Cemetery, located a short distance away, is one of the oldest active cemeteries within the San Fernando Valley.

== Geography ==
It is near the northern junction of the Golden State Freeway (I-5) and the San Diego Freeway (I-405). The Ronald Reagan Freeway (SR-118) bisects the community. Mission Hills is at the northern end of the long Sepulveda Boulevard. Other main thoroughfares are San Fernando Mission Boulevard, Woodman Avenue, and Rinaldi, Brand, Chatsworth, Devonshire, and Lassen Streets. The boundaries are roughly Sepulveda Blvd and Interstate 405 to the west, Interstate 5 to the north and east, Van Nuys Boulevard to the southeast, and Lassen Street to the south. The Granada Hills community lies to the west, Sylmar to the north, the city of San Fernando to the northeast, Pacoima to the east, Arleta to the southeast, and Panorama City to the south.

== History ==
The community that became Mission Hills was the town of Hickson, which was primarily agricultural. Following World War II and especially in the first half of the 1950s, the neighborhood grew as a residential suburban community. With the development of a residential subdivision called Dennis Park, the neighborhood began to be known by this name.

To serve this quickly developing section of the valley, the Dennis Park Shopping Center, in the northwest of Sepulveda Boulevard and Devonshire Street, began construction in late February, 1954, with $1,250,000 having been invested in its establishment. Designed by Los Angeles architect Arthur Froehlich and constructed under the direction of Spiros George Ponty, the shopping center covered 99,046 square feet of floor space and was built to have a large 175,870-square-foot paved parking area which could accommodate 400 cars; it was described as "featur[ing] latest scientific developments and most modern design," and was anticipated to be completed in September, 1954. The shopping center was built adjacent to the new Dennis Park residential subdivision, also developed by Ponty, and plans called for a large supermarket operated by Panorama Market Properties, a Thrifty Drug Store, a Ralph's Variety Store, among other facilities. By November, 1954, the new Panorama Market location was nearing completion, with company head Morris Weisstein announcing plans for a four-day grand opening celebration starting November 18, with the presence of media figures. Shoppers from neighboring communities attended the opening of the Panorama Market and Ralph's Variety Store, the two largest stores in the center. The new market was noted for featuring a large parking lot, air-conditioning, electrically controlled doors, wide and illuminated aisles, 14 check stands and conveyor belts. The planned Thrifty store was opened on November 30, becoming the 13th Thrifty in the valley and the 117th of the company. Present at the opening was television star Bill Gwinn, singer Patty Andrews, and Thrifty vice-president Manny Borun.

In 1956, residents voted 65% in favor of renaming the neighborhood "Mission Hills" in reference to the San Fernando Mission which lies in the community.

== Demographics ==
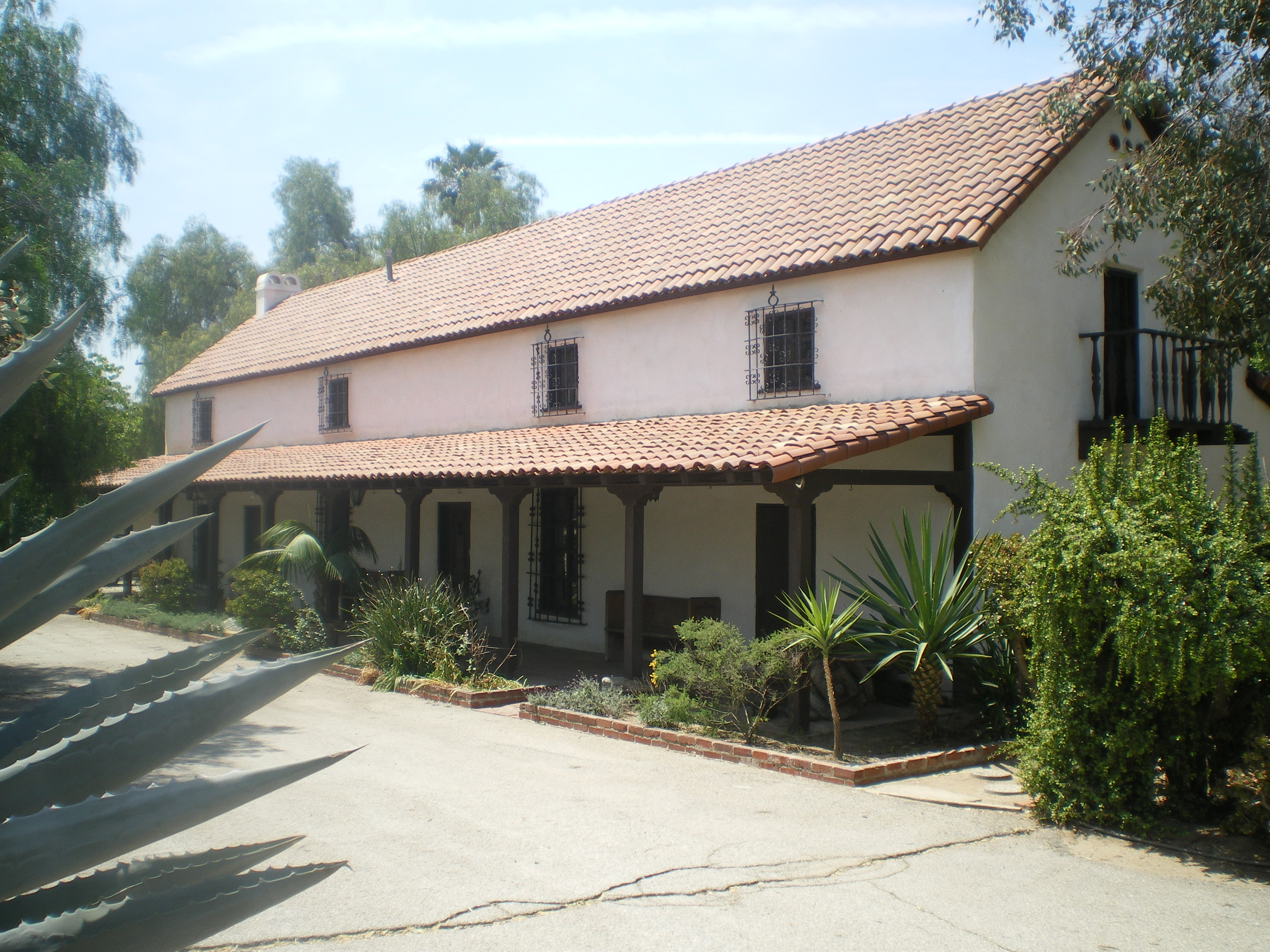
The historic Rómulo Pico Adobe, built in 1834 by the prominent Pico family of California, is the oldest residence in San Fernando Valley.

The 2010 U.S. census counted 18,496 residents in the area's 91345 ZIP Code. The median age was 36.3, and the median yearly household income at that time was $62,426.

In 2009, the Los Angeles Times's "Mapping L.A." project supplied the following numbers for the community of Mission Hills. Population: 18,237; median household income: $75,675. Mexican (41.3%) and German (4.4%) were the most common ancestries. Mexico (45.7%) and El Salvador (11.5%) were the most common foreign places of birth.

== Education ==
Residents are zoned to schools in the Los Angeles Unified School District. Mission Hills has one private school within its boundaries; Bishop Alemany High School which is run by the Archdiocese of Los Angeles.

== Medical centers ==
The community is serviced by Providence Holy Cross Medical Center, Facey Medical Group, and a newly opened Kaiser Permanente.

== Government and infrastructure ==
=== Postal services ===
Due to a loss of lease, the United States Postal Service closed the Mission Hills Post Office, formerly located at 10919 Sepulveda Blvd, Mission Hills, CA 91345. The last day of operation at this location was Friday, December 22, 2023. There is no operating United States Post Office in the Los Angeles community of Mission Hills, CA 91345.

=== Health services ===
The Los Angeles County Department of Health Services operates the Pacoima Health Center in Pacoima, serving Mission Hills.

=== Police ===
In May 2005, the Los Angeles Police Mission Area was established as the 19th station built in the City of Los Angeles. This police station serves the communities of Mission Hills, Sylmar, North Hills, Arleta, and Panorama City.

=== Fire & EMS ===
The City of Los Angeles Fire Department provides fire and emergency medical services from Station 75. This consists of two engines (E75 & E275), a ladder truck (T75), and both an advanced life support ambulance (Rescue 75) and a basic life support ambulance (Rescue 875).

=== Federal representation ===
- Mission Hills is represented in the United States Senate by California's Senators Adam Schiff and Alex Padilla.
- The community of Mission Hills is located within California's 29th congressional district represented by Democrat Luz Rivas.

=== State representation ===
Mission Hills is located within California's 39th State Assembly district represented by Democrat Celeste Rodriguez and California's 18th State Senate district represented by Democrat Robert Hertzberg.

=== Local representation ===
Mission Hills is located within Los Angeles City Council District 7 represented by Monica Rodriguez.

== Economy ==
=== Tourism ===
Tourists visit the Mission San Fernando Rey de España, a historical mission. The Andrés Pico Adobe is the second-oldest adobe home in the city of Los Angeles.

== Notable people ==
People who were born in Mission Hills include:

- Ryan Braun (major league baseball All Star and MVP outfielder)
- Tim Hill (baseball) (major league baseball reliever)
- Jessica Cosby (Olympic athlete; track and field)
- George Lopez (comedian)
