= César Chávez Learning Academies =

High school in San Fernando, California

Arroyo High School

Location
- 1001 Arroyo Avenue; San Fernando, California 91340; United States; 34.289480°N 118.421641°W

Information
- Other name: Valley Region High School #5 (VRHS #5)
- Type: Public high school
- Established: 2011
- School district: Los Angeles Unified School District
- Grades: 9–12
- Enrollment: ~1,158 (2024–25)
- Campus size: 250,000 sq ft (23,000 m^{2}) (building area)
- Campus type: Urban
- Website: arroyohs.lausd.org

Arroyo High School, also known as Valley Region High School #5 (VRHS #5), is a public high school campus of the Los Angeles Unified School District (LAUSD). It is located in the City of San Fernando in the San Fernando Valley region of the Los Angeles metropolitan area, in the US state of California. The campus was named after labor leader César Chávez; following sexual abuse allegations against Chávez in March 2026, the LAUSD board voted unanimously to rename the campus by fall 2026.

The campus houses four independent small high schools, each with its own curricular program and administration: Arts, Theatre, and Entertainment School (ArTES); the Academy of Scientific Exploration (ASE); Social Justice Humanitas Academy; and the Technology Preparatory Academy. All four academies offer a college-preparatory curriculum that fulfills University of California and California State University A–G admission requirements. The campus is part of the LAUSD North Valley Zone of Choice and falls within Board District 6.

== History ==
=== Opening ===
The school opened in September 2011 as part of LAUSD's effort to relieve overcrowding at San Fernando High School, Sylmar High School, Kennedy High School, and Verdugo Hills High School. The campus opened with approximately 1,600 students. Its architectural design was inspired by historical California missions. The 250,000-square-foot (23,000 m^{2}) campus was constructed by Turner Construction. The project includes a three-story classroom building and associated facilities.

The four academies on the campus were established through an open proposal process led by founding teacher staff and principals.

=== Renaming ===
In March 2026, following a New York Times investigation into sexual abuse allegations against Chávez, LAUSD issued a statement that they would be reviewing curriculum and resources related to Chávez. On March 24, 2026, the LAUSD Board of Education voted unanimously to rename the campus and César Chávez Elementary School in El Sereno by fall 2026, and to fund the removal of murals and other commemorations of Chávez at district schools. The board committed to working with the surrounding community to select new names.

== Academies ==
Each of the four academies operates as a separate school with its own California Department of Education school code, administration, bell schedule, and curricular focus.

=== Arts, Theatre, and Entertainment School (ArTES) ===
ArTES is a magnet school focused on scholarship and arts education. It is ranked 506th in California and 3,742nd nationally by U.S. News & World Report.

=== Academy of Scientific Exploration (ASE) ===
ASE emphasizes STEAM (science, technology, engineering, art, and mathematics) and features community service and project-based learning. ASE had an enrollment of 420 students in the 2024–25 school year.

=== Social Justice Humanitas Academy ===
Social Justice Humanitas Academy was designed and founded by teachers as a community school. Its mission centers on achieving social justice through the development of the individual student. The academy had an enrollment of 417 students in the 2024–25 school year and is ranked 677th in California by U.S. News & World Report.

=== Technology Preparatory Academy ===
The Technology Preparatory Academy focuses on developing self-directed, problem-solving lifelong learners. It had an enrollment of 321 students in the 2024–25 school year.
