= Providence Holy Cross Medical Center =

Hospital in Los Angeles, California, United States

- Providence Health & Services

Geography
- Location: Mission Hills, California, United States
- Coordinates: 34.27978°N 118.45981°W

Organization
- Care system: Private
- Type: Community
- Affiliated university: None

Services
- Emergency department: Level II trauma center
- Beds: 377

History
- Founded: 1961

Links
- Website: www.providence.org/holycross
- Lists: Hospitals in California

Providence Holy Cross Medical Center is a hospital in the Mission Hills district of Los Angeles, California, US. The hospital has 377 beds, and is part of Providence Health & Services.

== History ==
Holy Cross Medical Center was founded in 1961 by the Sisters of the Holy Cross from Notre Dame, Indiana. On May 1, 1996, the Sisters of Providence assumed sponsorship of the hospital, adding Providence to the name.

== Services ==
Providence Holy Cross Medical Center has operated a trauma center since 1984. The hospital also operates Providence Holy Cross Health Center in Valencia and Providence Holy Cross Health Center in Porter Ranch.
