= Arleta, Los Angeles =

Arleta
- Neighborhood
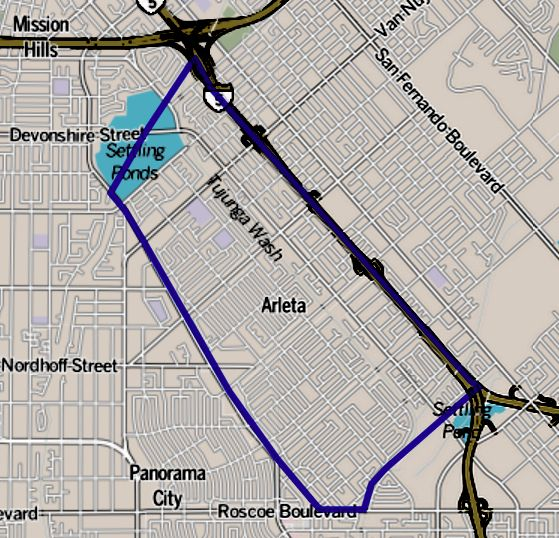
- Boundaries of Arleta as drawn by the Los Angeles Times

- Location within Los Angeles/San Fernando Valley Arleta (the Los Angeles metropolitan area)
- Coordinates: 34.2419444°N 118.4255556°W
- Country: United States
- State: California
- County: Los Angeles
- City: Los Angeles
- Time zone: UTC-8 (PST)
  - Summer (DST): UTC-7 (PDT)
- ZIP code: 91331

Arleta (/ɑːrˈliːtə/) is a neighborhood in the San Fernando Valley region of the city of Los Angeles, California. It contains a high percentage of Latino residents and of people born outside the United States.

== Geography ==
Arleta is bordered by the Los Angeles districts of Mission Hills and North Hills on the north, Sun Valley on the east, Pacoima on the northeast, and Panorama City on the west. It lies within the 6th City Council district.

The boundaries of Arleta are roughly Paxton Avenue on the northwest, Laurel Canyon Boulevard on the northeast, Tonopah Avenue on the southeast, and Woodman Avenue on the southwest, making the square area about four miles (6.4 km), according to Google Earth.

== History ==
The area of Arleta was a relatively undeveloped portion in the west of the community of Pacoima. This area remained semirural up to World War II when manufacturers expanded their operations into the valley and created more jobs. In order to accommodate factory workers, residential development increased in the area.

Most of Pacoima developed into a multiethnic neighborhood with a significant population of African-American and Latino residents, whereas the western portion remained primarily white. The 5 Freeway was built in the early 1960s and created a physical barrier between east and west Pacoima, and in the same period, residents in the western half led a petition and successfully broke from the neighborhood to form Arleta; the new neighborhood was officially recognized in 1968.

As industrial jobs began to decrease in the valley, many residents left the area in the 1980s; following this, Arleta became much more diverse and as of the 2010s, it shares the majority Latino demographics of Pacoima.

== Demographics ==
The 2000 U.S. census counted 31,068 residents in the 3.10 square miles (8.0 km^{2}) Arleta neighborhood—or 10,034 people per square mile, an average population density for the city. In 2008, the city estimated that the population had increased to 32,622. In 2000 the median age for residents was 29, about average for city neighborhoods. The percentage of residents aged 11 to 18 was among the county's highest.

The neighborhood was considered "moderately diverse" ethnically within Los Angeles, with a relatively high percentage of Latinos. The breakdown was Hispanic or Latino, 71.7%; Asian American, 11.0%; Non-Hispanic White, 13.2%; African American, 2.2%; and others, 1.9%. Mexico (55.3%) and El Salvador (11.2%) were the most common places of birth for the 46% of the residents who were born abroad—which was a high percentage for Los Angeles.

The median yearly household income in 2008 dollars was $65,649, considered average for the city. Renters occupied 19.6% of the housing stock, and house- or apartment-owners held 80.4%. The average household size of 4.0 people was considered high for Los Angeles. The 11.5% of families headed by single parents was considered about average for city neighborhoods.

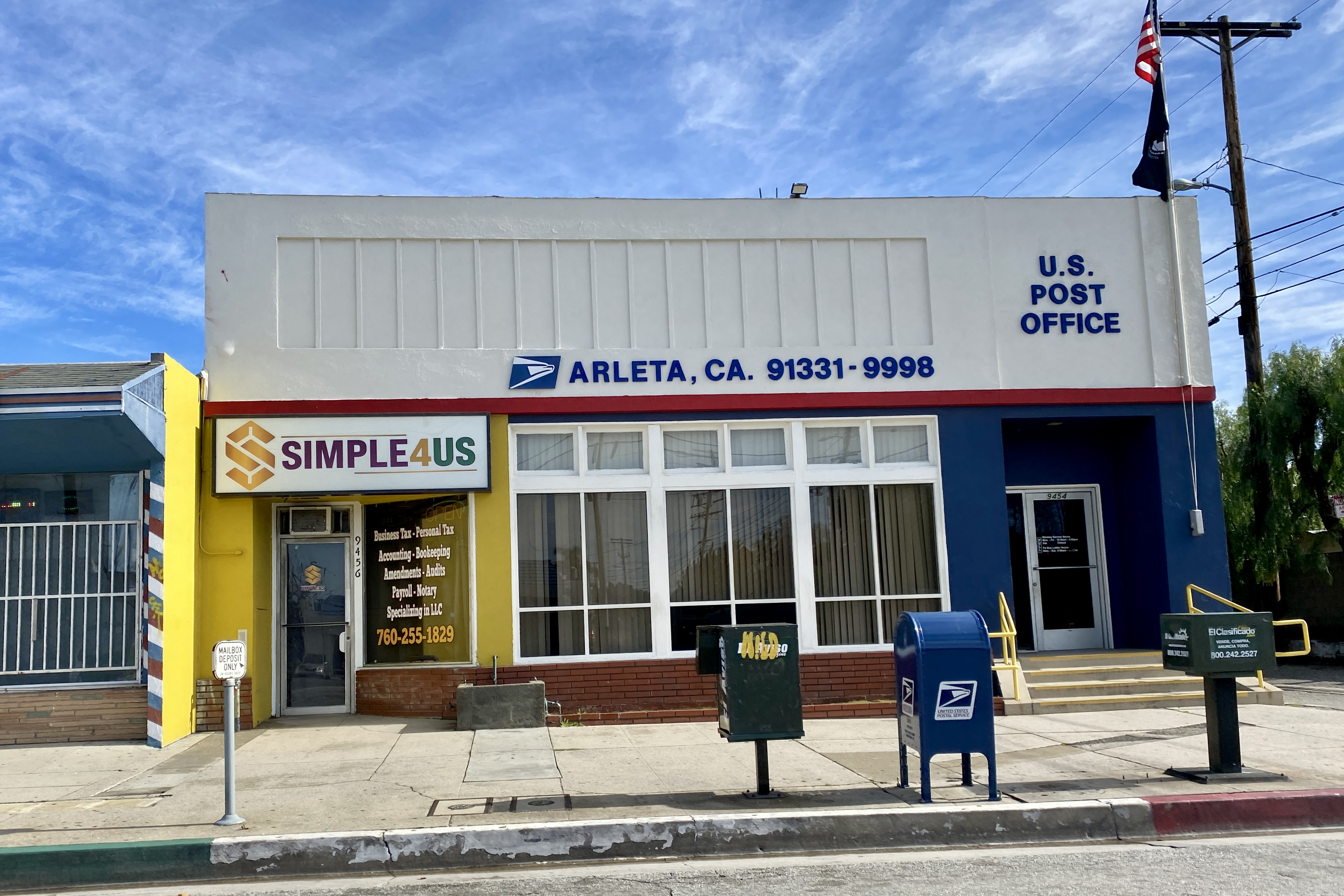
Arleta Post Office, a substation of the Pacoima Station

== Economy ==
The fashion company Juicy Couture has its headquarters in Arleta.

== Parks and recreation ==
Branford Park is located in Arleta. The facility has an auditorium, a lighted baseball diamond, an unlighted baseball diamond, lighted outdoor basketball courts, a children's play area, a community room, an indoor gymnasium with weights, an indoor gymnasium without weights, an outdoor gymnasium without weights, a kitchen, a music room, picnic tables, a lighted soccer field, a stage, lighted tennis courts, and lighted volleyball courts. In addition the Devonshire Arleta Park in Arleta.

== Government and infrastructure ==
- California's 29th congressional district — federal
- California's 20th State Senate district
- California's 39th State Assembly district
- Los Angeles City Council District 6

The United States Postal Service Arleta Post Office is located at 9454 Arleta Avenue. This post office was opened shortly before Christmas 1954. The original construction was performed by Ralph Benton of Van Nuys at a total cost of $21,500.

== Education ==
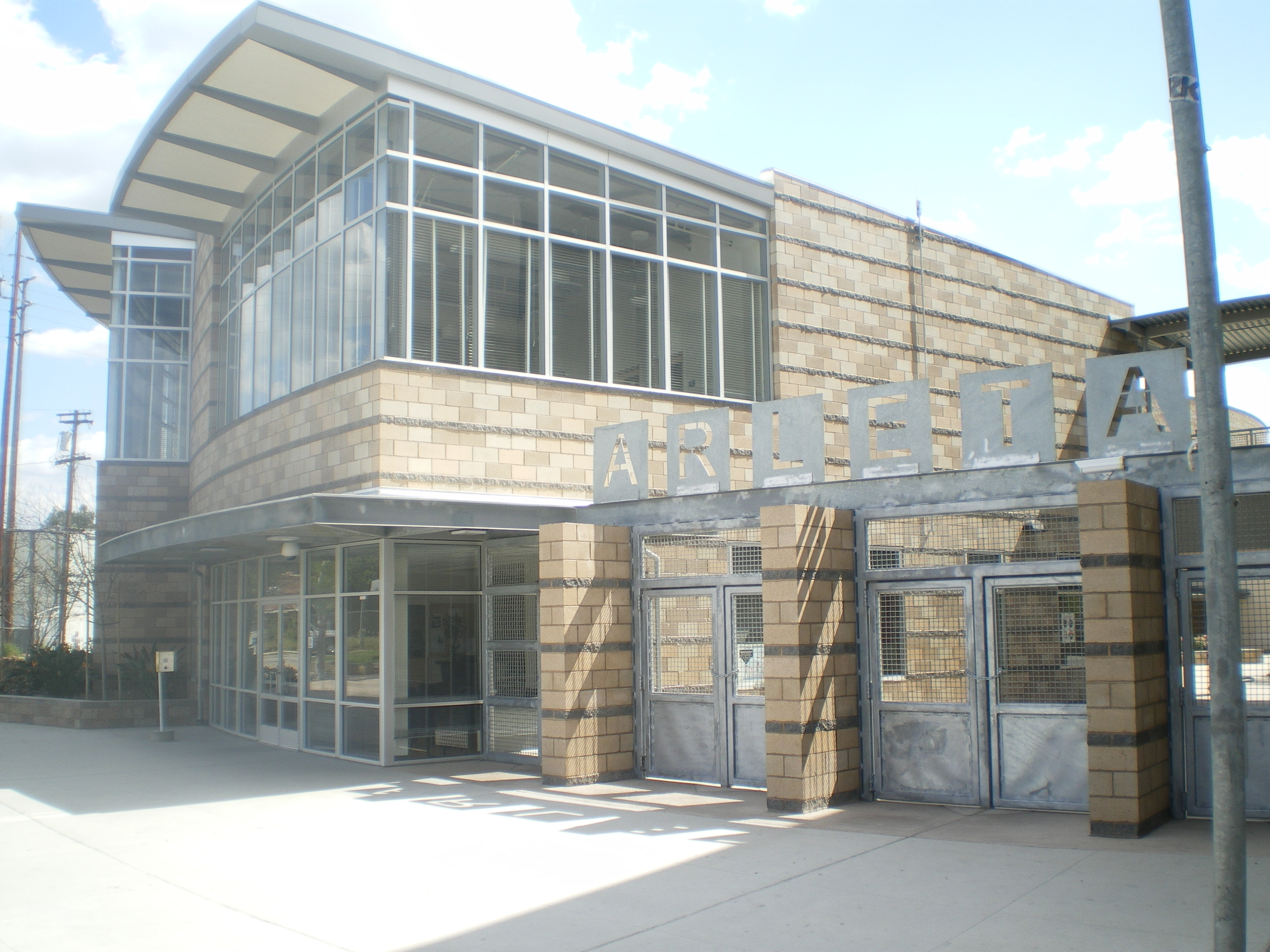
Arleta High School

Arleta is within the Los Angeles Unified School District. The schools within Arleta are as follows:

- Arleta High School, 14200 Van Nuys Boulevard
- Sharp Avenue Elementary School, 13800 Pierce Street
- Beachy Avenue Elementary School, 9757 Beachy Avenue
- Vena Avenue Elementary School, 9377 Vena Avenue
- Canterbury Avenue Elementary School, 13670 Montague Street
- Bert Corona Charter Middle School, 9400 Remick Avenue

== Infrastructure ==
=== Transportation ===
Arleta is accessible from the Golden State Freeway (I-5) and the Hollywood Freeway (SR 170). Major thoroughfares include Van Nuys Boulevard, Woodman Avenue and Arleta Avenue, as well as Sheldon, Branford, Osborne and Terra Bella Streets. Metro Rapid route 761 provides fast transit on Van Nuys Boulevard, and Metro route 158, goes up Woodman Avenue, but turns on Arleta Avenue via Brandford Street, and continues along Devonshire St into Granada Hills, Northridge, and Chatsworth, respectively.

=== Libraries ===
Los Angeles Public Library operates the Granada Hills Branch.

== Notable people ==
- Missy Avila (murder victim)
- Johnny Burnette, rockabilly singer
- The Osmonds, singing group
- Sharon Shapiro, gymnast

== Popular culture ==
Arleta was also the filming location for the fictitious McFly family home and neighborhood in the Back to the Future series.

== See also ==
- Van Nuys Boulevard
- List of neighborhoods and districts in Los Angeles
