= San Fernando Gardens =

American housing project

Coordinates: 34.268°N 118.416°W

San Fernando Gardens is a housing project located in the Pacoima district of the San Fernando Valley region of Los Angeles, California.

San Fernando Gardens was built in 1955, with a low-rise, garden apartment design. The project was racially integrated;. It is located in the northernmost project in Housing Authority of the City of Los Angeles's system.

== Education ==
San Fernando Gardens is assigned to the following Los Angeles Unified School District schools:

- Pacoima Elementary School
- Maclay Middle School
- San Fernando High School
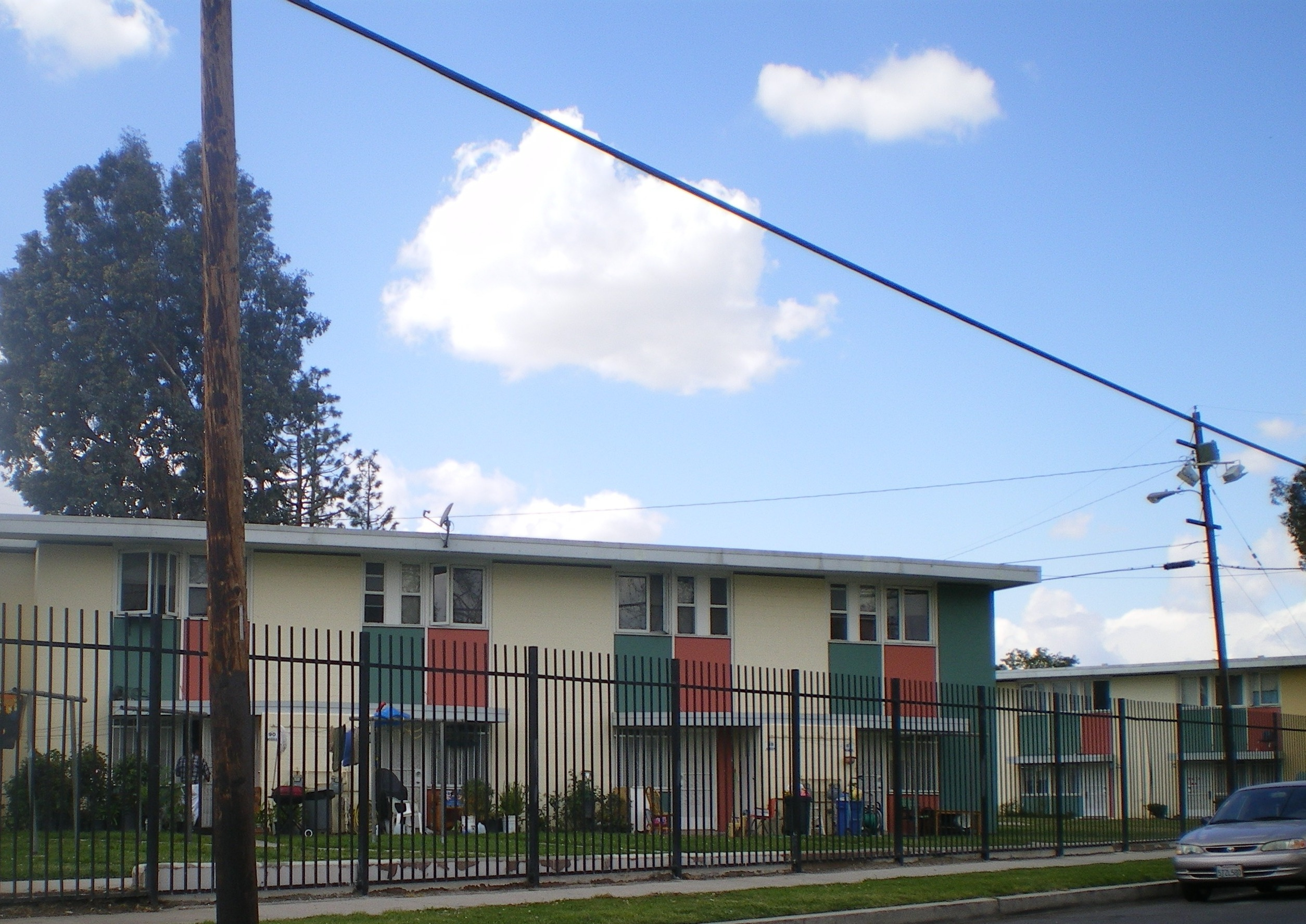
San Fernando Gardens

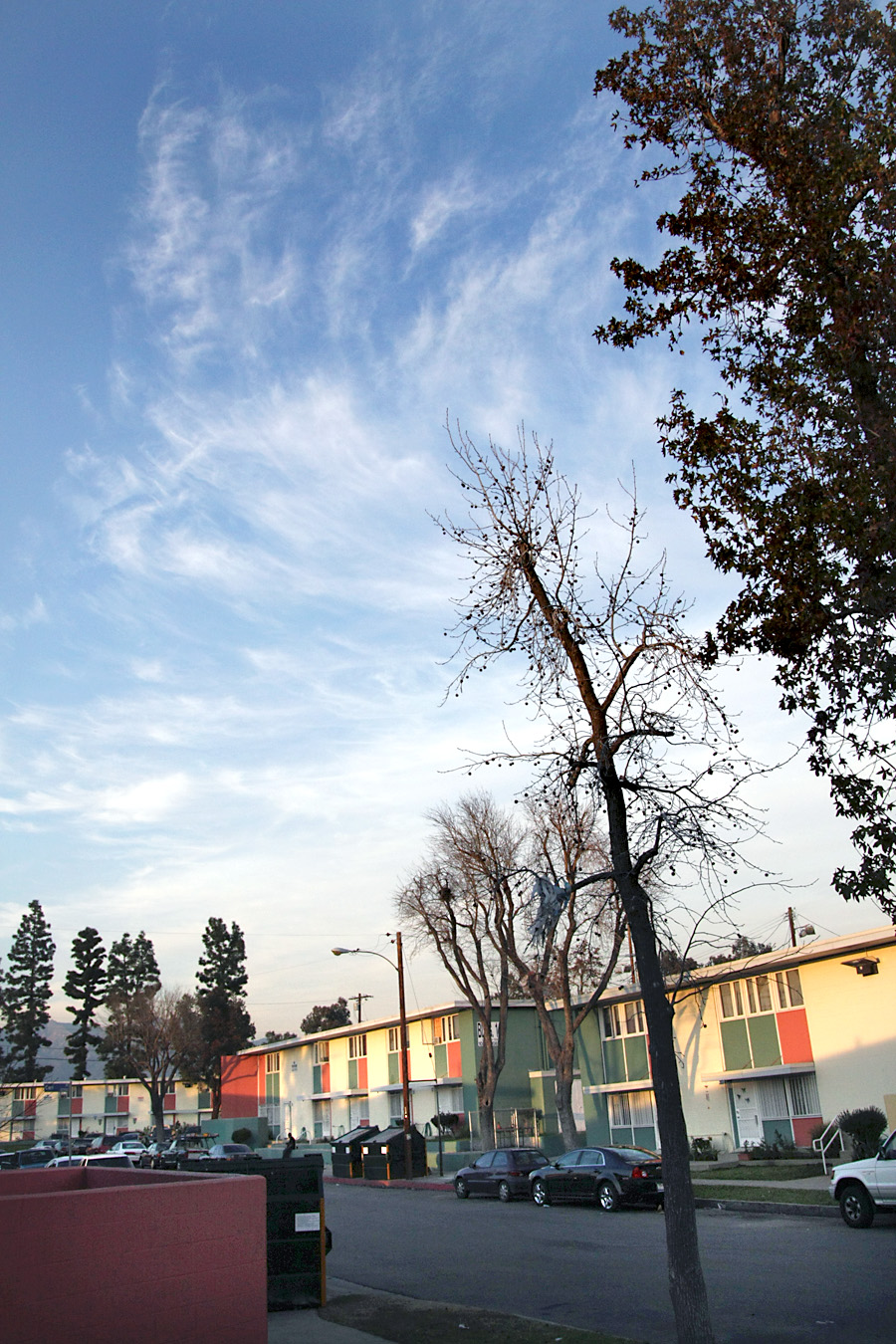
Apartment buildings on Lehigh Avenue
