= Arleta High School =

School in Los Angeles, California, United States

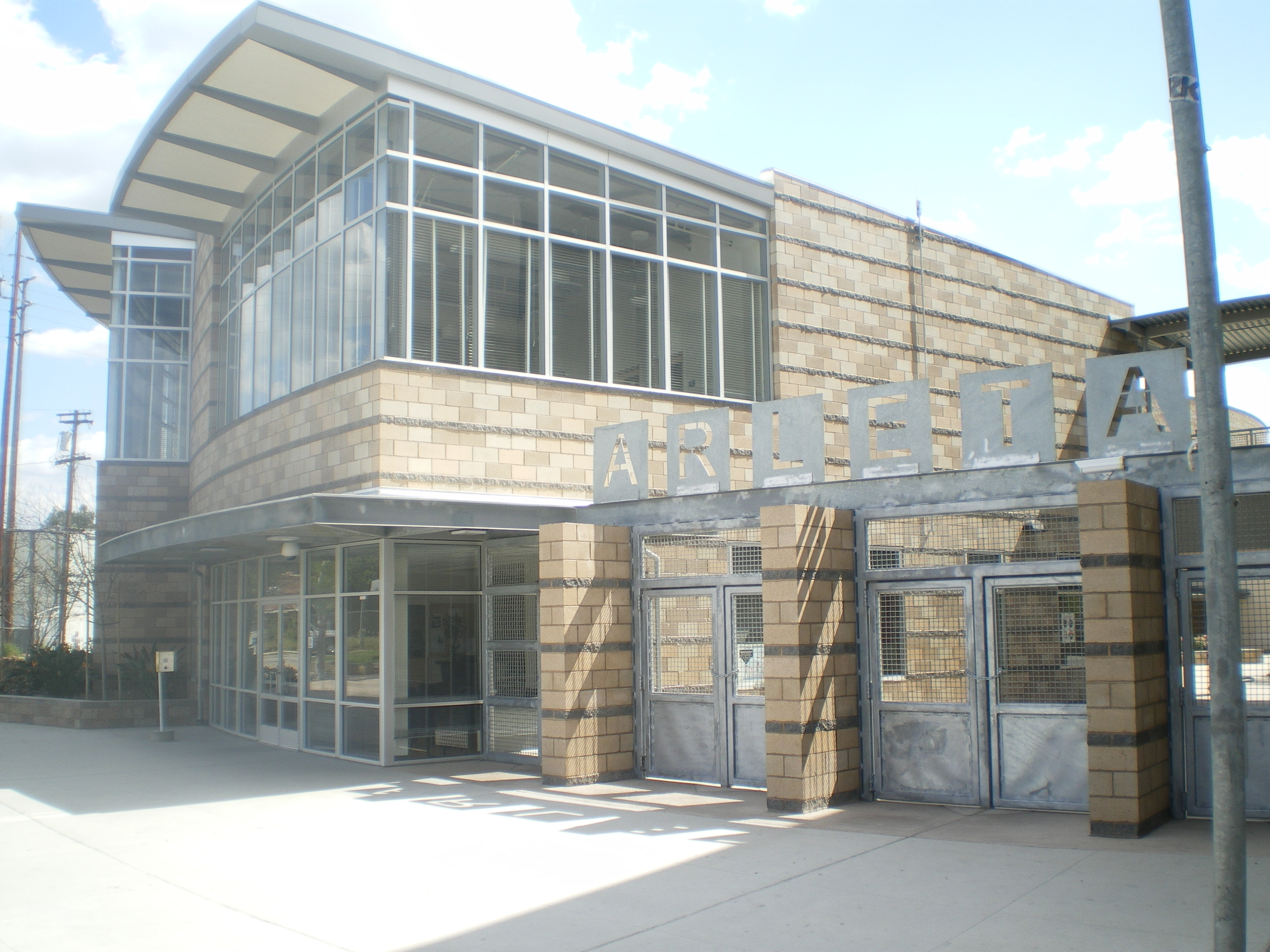

Location
- 14200 Van Nuys Blvd; Arleta, California 91331; United States; 34.250556°N 118.442222°W

Information
- School type: Public high school
- Motto: “We are Mustangs!”
- Established: October 3, 2006; 20 years ago
- Status: 🟩 Opened
- Locale: City, Large
- School district: Los Angeles Unified School District
- NCES District ID: 0622710
- NCES School ID: 062271011652
- Dean: Cynthia Garcia and Donald Scott
- Principal: Ana Saucedo
- Teaching staff: 59.40 (on an FTE basis)
- Grades: 9–12
- Age range: 14-18
- Enrollment: 1,038 (2024–25)
  - Male: 516
  - Female: 522
- Student to teacher ratio: 17.47
- Education system: Los Angeles Unified School District initiative
- Language: English, Spanish
- Campus type: suburb
- Color: Victory Red White Black
- Fight song: "We Are Mustangs!"
- Athletics: Football, Baseball, Basketball, Volleyball, Soccer, Track & Field, Softball, Dance, Drill and Competitive Cheer
- Athletics conference: East Valley League; CIF Los Angeles City Section
- Mascot: Mustang
- Nickname: Mustangs
- Feeder schools: Pacoima Middle School; Sepulveda Middle School
- Graduates: 95% (2023-24)
- Website: arletahigh.net

Arleta High School (AHS) is a secondary school located on Van Nuys Boulevard in the Arleta section of Los Angeles, California, United States in the San Fernando Valley. The school is operated by the Los Angeles Unified School District. 1,038 students were enrolled in the 2024–25 school year.

== History ==
The school opened on October 3, 2006, serving grades 9 through 10 during its first year of operation. It is part of the Los Angeles Unified School District. The school phased in grade 11 in the fall of 2007 and grade 12 in the fall of 2008. In June 2009, the first class graduated.

The school houses three small schools: Social Justice (SJ), Science Math and Related Technologies (SMART), and Visual and Performing Arts (VAPA).

All three schools utilize block scheduling where students take four 82-minute classes a day. Students finish a year's study in sixteen weeks. Arleta High School is recognized as one of the California Gold Ribbon Schools by the California Department of Education.

Throughout the 4-year term, students are required to create a portfolio of all of their academic successes and present it in order to graduate and participate in the graduation ceremony. Transfer students must complete an essay of their academic success from their previous high school(s) and continue to complete their portfolio as much as possible.

On Tuesdays the school encourages students to dress professionally as a preparation in career seeking, many benefits include good participation grading, priority to receive lunch, certificates and more.

== Athletics ==
Arleta High School Athletics is part of the East Valley League of the CIF Los Angeles City Section. Fall sports include football, girls volleyball, cross country. Winter sports include basketball, soccer, and traditional competition cheer. Spring sports include track and field, golf, softball, baseball, boys volleyball, and game day competition cheer. Arleta High School's dance team performs and trains all year round.

In 2025 Arleta's cheer team won the state CIF title.

== Public Appearances ==
- On My Block (TV Series)
- Freeridge (TV Series)
