= Michael Woo =

American politician and academic

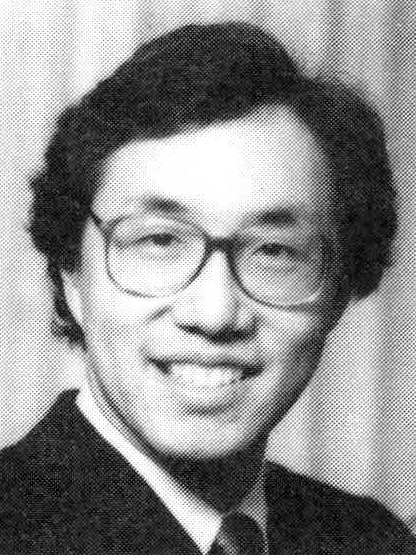
- Official portrait, 1986

Dean of the Cal Poly Pomona College of Environmental Design
- In office 2009–2019

Member of the Los Angeles City Council from the 13th district
- In office 1985–1993
- Preceded by: Peggy Stevenson
- Succeeded by: Jackie Goldberg

Personal details
- Born: Michael K. Woo; October 8, 1951 (age 75) Los Angeles County, California, U.S.
- Education: Alhambra High School
- Alma mater: University of California, Santa Cruz (B.S.); University of California, Berkeley (M.S.)

Chinese name
- Traditional Chinese: 胡紹基
- Simplified Chinese: 胡绍基
Transcriptions
Standard Mandarin
- Hanyu Pinyin: Hú Shàojī

Michael K. Woo (born October 8, 1951) is an American politician and academic who was the dean of the College of Environmental Design at California State Polytechnic University, Pomona. As a member of the Los Angeles City Council representing District 13 from 1985 to 1993, he was that body's first Asian American member and its youngest member upon his election, at 33.

== Early life ==
Woo was born October 8, 1951, in Los Angeles County, California, the son of Wilbur and Beth Woo, native Chinese. Wilbur left the family's ancestral village in the city of Kaiping, China in 1940 to study at UCLA and had to stay in the United States during World War II, while Beth remained in China under Japanese occupation with two young daughters, Pat (later Wong) and Janice (later Chin). The family was reunited after the war, in 1946, and settled in a five-bedroom Monterey Park hillside home. Younger daughter Janice had contracted polio and needed seven operations before she could walk without help. The Woos had three more children born in the United States—Michael, Elaine, a journalist on the Los Angeles Times, and Pamela, who had Down's syndrome.

Woo went to Alhambra High School, and at the age of sixteen he attended summer classes at California State College at Los Angeles under a special program for gifted students. When he was a senior, his invitation on behalf of a student group to the editor of the UCLA Daily Bruin to talk at Alhambra High was vetoed by a department chairman who feared the editor "might speak on a controversial subject" that could be misunderstood outside the campus.

Young Woo chose to attend the University of California, Santa Cruz, he said, to get away from his family and into an unstructured environment. He graduated with honors in 1973 and earned his master's degree in city planning two years later from the University of California, Berkeley, with a thesis on the origins of regional government in the San Francisco Bay Area.

=== Chinese name ===
Michael Woo's Chinese name is 胡紹基, which is rendered Hú Shàojī in the Pinyin orthography and Wu4 Siu6 Gei1 in the Jyutping romanization.

== Career ==
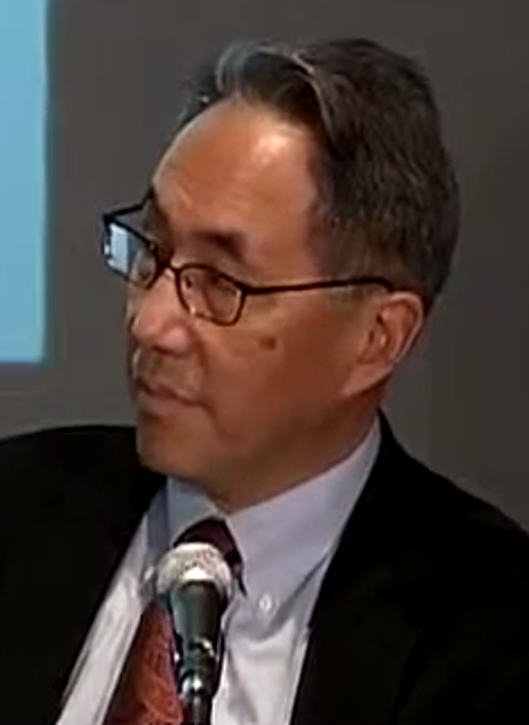
Woo speaking at Loyola Marymount University in 2009.

=== Early career ===
Wilbur and his father, David Kitman Woo, began a produce business in a spot at the Ninth Street Market vacated by a Japanese man who was interned during the Second World War. After arriving in the United States, Beth Woo became the bookkeeper for the family business. In the 1960s, Wilbur Woo and friends chartered Cathay Bank, the first bank in Chinatown. He studied banking and later became a vice-president of the organization.

=== Volunteering ===
As the only son in his family, Michael Woo said he was brought up "with the expectation that I would have a leadership role of my own"; he worked in summer 1970 as a volunteer in the office of Assemblyman David Roberti and later for Democratic Senator William Proxmire of Wisconsin and in the presidential primary campaign of New York Mayor John V. Lindsay.

=== Senate staffer ===
Woo joined the staff of David Roberti after the latter was elected to the California State Senate in 1973. He took a leave in December 1980 to run for the City Council the next year, and he moved from Alhambra to Silver Lake to do so.

=== Academia ===
Woo previously taught at Harvard University and University of California, Los Angeles. He was dean of the College of Environmental Design at California State Polytechnic University, Pomona, retiring in 2019.

== Los Angeles City Council ==
=== Elections ===
==== 1981 ====
Woo first ran for District 13 on the council in 1981, against incumbent Peggy Stevenson. The aggressive race was controversial for the supposedly racialized rhetoric used by Stevenson against Woo. Her primary campaign sent out fliers which asked Republican voters if they wanted the candidate supported by the Mexican American Political Association and the Asian Democratic Caucus "or Councilwoman Peggy Stevenson". She denied they were meant to raise racial questions but simply to point up Woo's "ultraliberal" support. Stevenson was also endorsed by controversial police chief Daryl Gates, which has been debated as being either an asset or a liability. Stevenson won the election with 20,162 votes to Woo's 13,018.

==== 1985 ====
The 1985 race in District 13, again between Councilwoman Peggy Stevenson and Woo, was notoriously expensive and cost a reported one million dollars. Stevenson was supported by "some of the city's most prominent political fund-raisers" and the "real estate industry," while Woo's Republican banker father provided about half of the $437,000 raised for his campaign. Zev Yaroslavsky and Marvin Braude, Los Angeles City Councilmembers expected to endorse Stevenson, endorsed Woo.

Woo was victorious in the race, with 16,417 votes to Stevenson's 12,052. The Los Angeles times credited the win to "family wealth, ethnic pride, younger voters and festering discontent with an incumbent officeholder". Stevenson blamed a "Westside political organization" headed by U.S. Representatives Henry Waxman and Howard Berman for her loss.

=== Tenure ===
- Film, 1985. Woo publicly censured the MGM-UA film Year of the Dragon, a graphic movie about a crime war and violent youth gangs in New York's Chinatown. He was reported to be negotiating a public disclaimer that would be issued by the studio concerning the picture.
- Sanctuary, 1986. In his first major triumph, he succeeded in maneuvering the City Council into declaring that Los Angeles would be considered a "city of sanctuary" for political refugees, but the resulting public outcry forced the council to reverse itself and repeal the entire resolution.
- Light rail, 1988. Woo and Mayor Tom Bradley wrote the June referendum ballot arguments in favor of establishing a light-rail line into the San Fernando Valley. Councilman Ernani Bernardi of the Valley was opposed.
- Rodney King, 1991. He was the City Council leader in a fight to oust Police Chief Daryl Gates in the wake of the beating of Rodney G. King by police officers.

== Later campaigns ==
=== 1993 Los Angeles mayoral campaign ===
Woo left his council seat in 1993 to run for mayor that year against Richard Riordan. Woo was endorsed by Bill Clinton, who was running for president at the time. Riordan garnered 54 percent of votes to Woo's 46 percent.

=== 1994 California Secretary of State campaign ===
Woo ran for California Secretary of State in 1994. He lost to Tony Miller.

=== 2001 Los Angeles City Council campaign ===
Woo attempted a comeback to his old City Council seat in 2001, but was defeated by Eric Garcetti by 1,000 votes, as Woo garnered 48% of the vote.

Preceded by Peggy Stevenson	Los Angeles City Council; 13th District; 1985–93	Succeeded by Jackie Goldberg
