= Rick Cole =

American politician

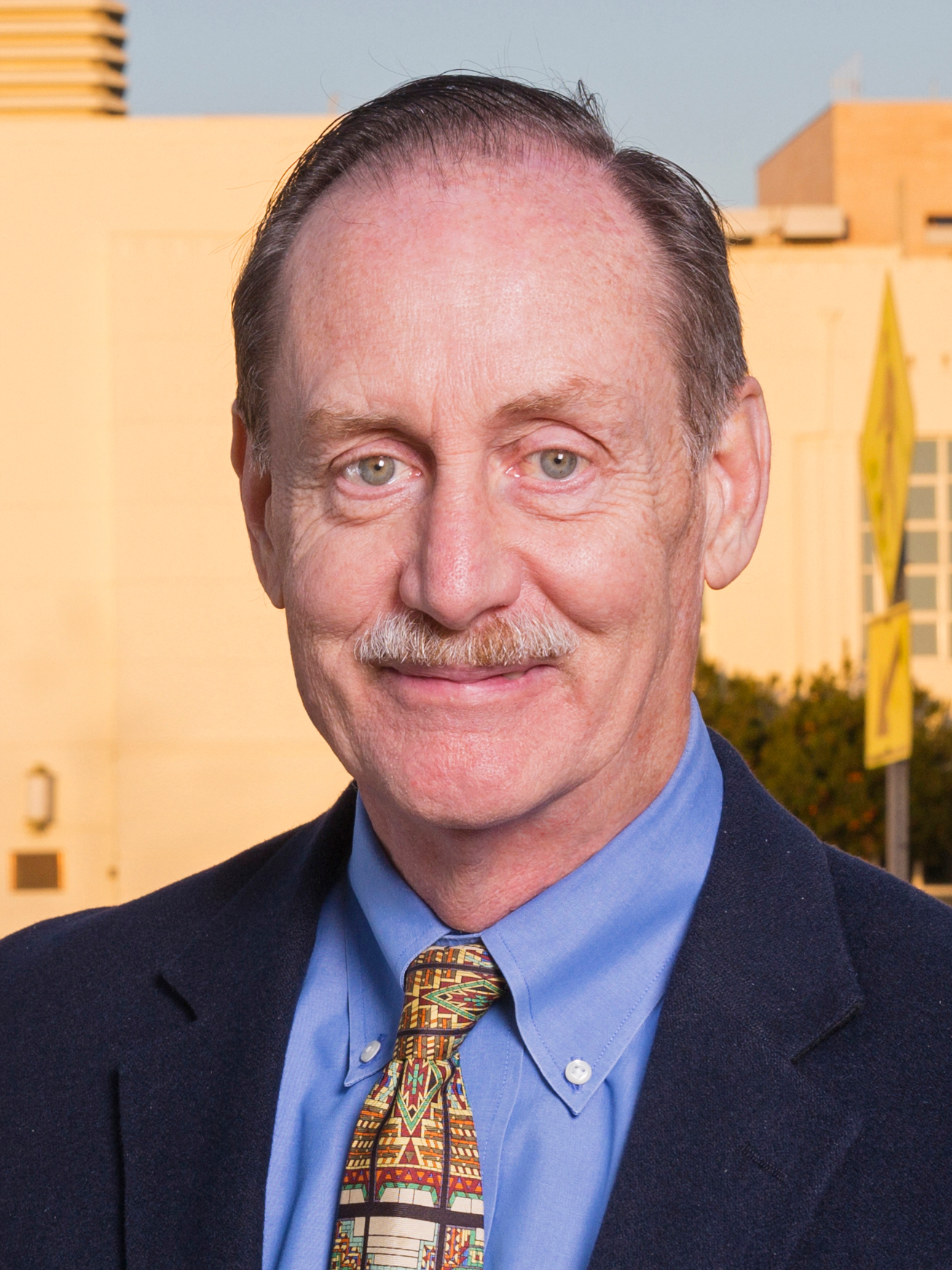

Member of the Pasadena City Council for the 2nd District
- Incumbent
- Assumed office December 9, 2024
- Preceded by: Felicia Williams
- In office 1983–1995
- Preceded by: Stephen Acker
- Succeeded by: Paul Little

50th Mayor of Pasadena
- In office May 4, 1992 – May 12, 1994
- Preceded by: Jess Hughston
- Succeeded by: Katie Nack

City Manager of Azusa
- In office July 1998 – March 28, 2004

City Manager of Ventura
- In office April 26, 2004 – September 15, 2012
- Preceded by: Donna Landeros
- Succeeded by: Mark Watkins

Deputy Mayor of Los Angeles
- In office July 14, 2013 – June 2, 2015
- Appointed by: Eric Garcetti

City Manager of Santa Monica
- In office June 2, 2015 – April 17, 2020
- Preceded by: Rod Gould
- Succeeded by: David White

Deputy Los Angeles City Controller
- In office December 1, 2022 – July 11, 2025
- Appointed by: Kenneth Mejia

Personal details
- Born: June 27, 1953 (age 73) Detroit, Michigan
- Party: Democratic
- Spouse: Katherine Aguilar Perez
- Children: 3
- Education: Occidental College (BA); Columbia University (MA)
- Rick Cole's voice Rick Cole on Santa Monica’s history of economic prosperity Recorded February 1, 2018

Rick Cole (born June 27, 1953) is an American politician and former journalist. He was a member of the Pasadena City Council from 1983 until 1995 and again from 2024 until 2025, and was Pasadena's mayor from 1992 until 1994. Cole has also held positions as the city manager for Azusa, Ventura, and Santa Monica, as well as Deputy Mayor of Los Angeles under Eric Garcetti and Deputy Los Angeles City Controller under Kenneth Mejia.

== Early life and education ==
Cole was born on June 27, 1953 in Detroit, Michigan. He moved to Pasadena, California and graduated from Blair High School, later attending with a bachelor's degree from Occidental College in 1978 and a master's degree from Columbia University in 1979. He didn’t hold a full-time job until he was 30 years old when he ran for City Council. Before that, he worked as a freelance journalist, volunteered for campaigns, and headed Mayor of Cleveland Dennis Kucinich’s housing rehabilitation office for three months.

While a student at Blair High School, Cole led a walkout protesting the Kent State shootings by the Ohio National Guard in 1970. That same year, he led a group shouting and firing cap guns into a meeting of conservative school board candidates. He worked for the 1972 presidential campaign of U.S. Representative Pete McCloskey, the congressional re-election campaign for Allard K. Lowenstein, and the 1979 re-election campaign for Dennis Kucinich for Mayor of Cleveland.

== Pasadena City Council and mayoralty ==
In 1983, he ran for the Pasadena Board of City Directors (later renamed the Pasadena City Council) against incumbent Stephen Acker. During his campaign, he called himself a populist rather than a liberal and referred to a progressive majority when discussing a power shift. He defeated Acker in the election in an upset, becoming one of two candidates in a coalition of liberals and ethnic minorities that attempted to defeat incumbents on the board. He resigned from Pasadena Media Inc. in December 1984 to avoid conflicts of interest with its paper, Pasadena Weekly. On January 4, 1986, Cole was hired as a legislative aide by Richard Alatorre, who had been elected to the Los Angeles City Council. On May 4, 1992, Cole was named the Mayor of Pasadena, succeeding Jess Hughston, who had been his history teacher while at Blair High School.

While as a member of the Board, he criticized the Tournament of Roses and led compromises with the organization. While as vice mayor, he led the criticism of the appointment of a direct descendant of Christopher Columbus as grand marshal of the 1992 Rose Parade, stating that Columbus was a symbol of "greed, slavery, rape, and genocide". He also criticized the composition of the Tournament of Roses board. In the 1993 parade, he wore a T-shirt with the message "Tournament of Racism", which was obscured by another shirt. In November 1994, Cole announced that he would be retiring from the council in order to improve community participation in local government. He was succeeded by neighborhood activist Paul Little.

== City manager and deputy positions ==
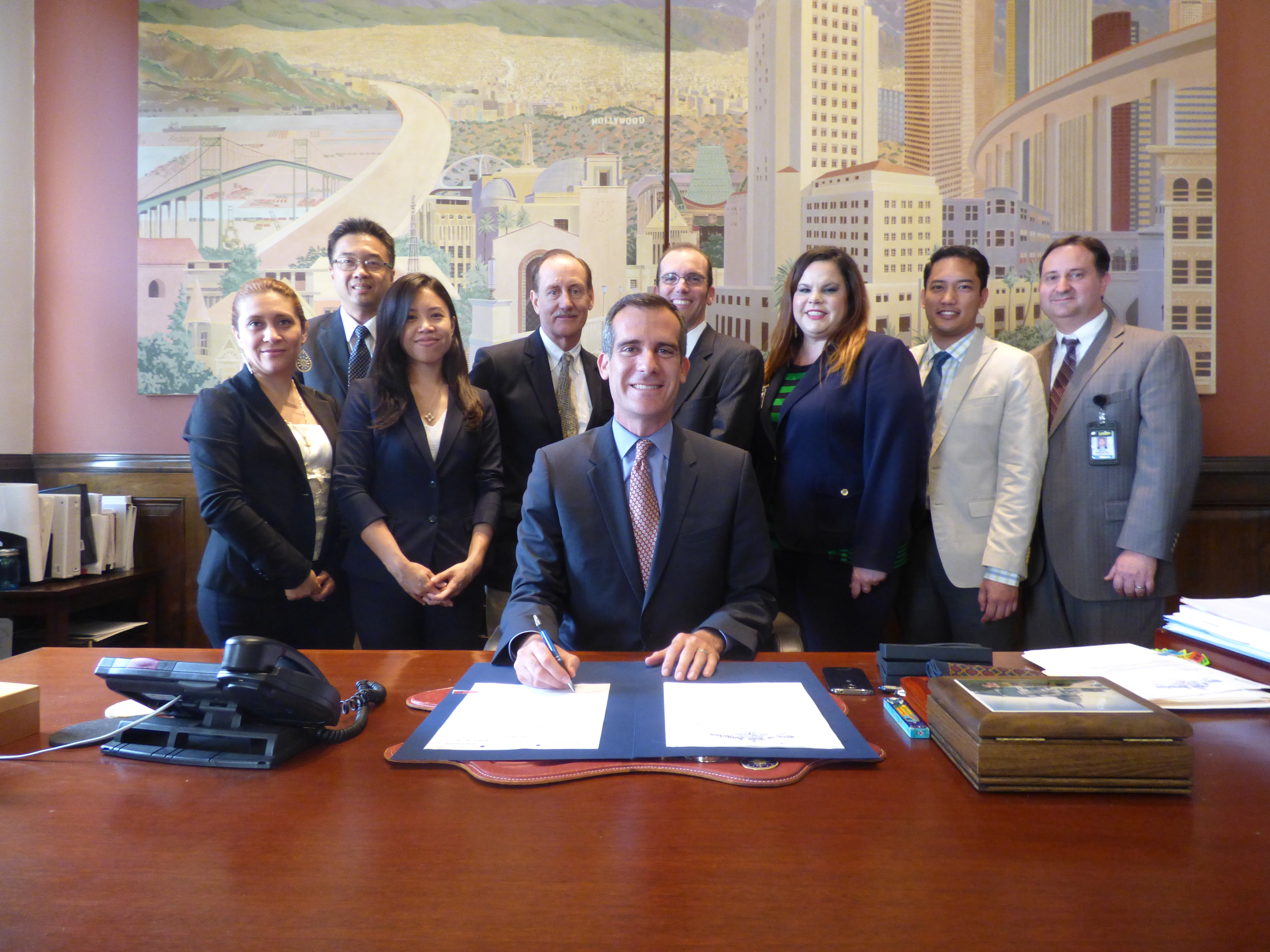
Cole (left, behind Mayor Eric Garcetti) and the Mayor's Office of Budget and Innovation in 2014.

In July 1998, Cole was appointed as the city manager of Azusa, California, chosen by the council from an applicant pool composed of mostly bureaucrats. During his tenure as Azusa's city manager, Cole played a significant role in improving the city's economy and spearheaded the implementation of the first citywide form-based code in California. In March 2000, Cole was investigated for criminal vandalism after covering up a billboard for the Los Angeles Avengers that had sexually suggestive text which read "Six Beautiful Women Will Show You Their Panties". He admitted to the act, explaining that because the billboard was near a city playground, he acted according to his conscience. The Los Angeles County District Attorney declined to file any charges against him. Additionally, councilmember Dick Stanford paid for the use of the city truck that Cole used.

On January 2, 2004, Donna Landeros, the city manager of Ventura, California, resigned, citing a lack of support from council members as the reason for her departure. Cole accepted the city's offer to become the city manager in January 2004 and began working as the city manager of Ventura on April 26, 2004. As city manager of Ventura, Cole prioritized visionary goals over code enforcement and construction details, a strategy that drew criticism from some councilmembers. While serving in that position, he was considered but not selected for the city manager position in Austin, Texas. His forced resignation from the position in 2012 was accepted by a 4–3 vote.

He became the parish administrator at the San Buenaventura Mission in 2012. In July 2013, Cole was appointed by Mayor of Los Angeles Eric Garcetti to oversee budget and innovation efforts after being approached by Garcetti’s transition team. They were drawn to Cole's implementation of performance-based budgeting in Azusa and Ventura. He had initially planned to remain with the administration, but when offered the position of city manager of Santa Monica, a role he was unanimously selected for by Santa Monica’s council, he decided to leave.

While as Santa Monica's city manager, a petition calling for Cole's resignation was signed by more than 2,800 people, alleging that Cole asked the City Council to cut programs and furlough city staff, which he denied as rumors. On April 18, 2020, Cole resigned from his position as city manager of Santa Monica, citing divisions over budget cuts because of the COVID-19 pandemic.

During the 2022 Los Angeles City Controller election, Cole supported Kenneth Mejia, who was running against political veteran and councilmember Paul Koretz. He reached out to Mejia when he saw the campaign’s billboard featuring the city budget and offered his assistance and advice. After Mejia won, he appointed Cole as the Deputy City Controller.

On June 16, 2025, Cole announced his resignation as chief deputy controller for the City of Los Angeles.

== Return to Pasadena ==
On May 10, 2023, Cole announced his candidacy for his former City Council seat in 2024 to succeed Felicia Williams, who was running for the California State Assembly. However, in August, Williams withdrew from the assembly race and decided to run for re-election, setting up a contest between the two. During the campaign, a mailer for Williams attacked Cole for his efforts 30 years prior, criticizing his actions related to the Tournament of Roses and referencing his controversial "Tournament of Racism" attire. Williams faced criticism for the mailers, including from fellow council members, for not focusing on policy and issues. In the election, Cole defeated Williams by 19 points, returning him to the City Council.

== Personal life ==
Cole is married to Katherine Aguilar Perez, who was the executive director of the Southern California Transportation and Land Use Coalition. They have twin daughters and a son. The family resides in Pasadena but has moved to the cities where Rick Cole served as city manager. They purchased a house in Ventura when he was named the city manager there in 2004.

== Recognition ==
In 2006, he was selected as one of Governing Magazine's nine "Public Officials of the Year", noting his "urban revival skills". On his resignation as Ventura's city manager, the Ventura County Star editorialized that Cole had "led a downtown revitalization, guided Ventura through daunting budget challenges and oversaw important but unsexy work such as improving public works, water and sewer operations".
