= California's 41st district =

California's 41st district may refer to:

- California's 41st congressional district
- California's 41st State Assembly district
