= Chris Holden =

American politician (born 1960)

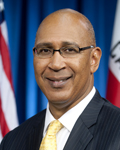

Majority Leader of the California Assembly
- In office December 1, 2014 – March 10, 2016
- Preceded by: V. Manuel Perez
- Succeeded by: Ian Calderon

Member of the California State Assembly from the 41st district
- In office December 3, 2012 – November 30, 2024
- Preceded by: Julia Brownley (redistricted)
- Succeeded by: John Harabedian

53rd Mayor of Pasadena
- In office May 1997 – May 1999
- Preceded by: Bill Paparian
- Succeeded by: Bill Bogaard

Personal details
- Born: July 19, 1960 (age 66) Pasadena, California, U.S.
- Party: Democratic
- Spouse: Melanie Holden
- Children: 5
- Parent: Nate Holden (father)
- Education: San Diego State University
- Profession: Small businessman

Christopher R. Holden (born July 19, 1960) is an American politician who served in the California State Assembly from 2012 to 2024. He is a Democrat representing the 41st Assembly District, which encompasses the northern San Gabriel Valley, and is centered in Pasadena.

He was a member of the California Legislative Black Caucus. Prior to his election to the assembly in 2012, Holden was a mayor and City Councilmember in Pasadena. He is the son of longtime Los Angeles politician Nate Holden. Prior to his retirement, Holden served as chairman of the Appropriations Committee, the most powerful position after speaker.

Since leaving office, Holden has been the chief executive officer of LA Fire Justice, a legal organization which files lawsuits to hold those responsible for the Eaton Fire accountable.

== History ==
Before he was elected to the assembly, Holden was a member of the Pasadena City Council, and a former mayor of the city, serving from 1997 to 1999. Holden is the second longest-serving city council member in the city's history, having served since 1989.

Holden is an alumnus of Pasadena High School and San Diego State University. He first ran for seat 3 of the Pasadena City Council in 1985 but lost narrowly to incumbent Loretta Thompson-Glickman. He was elected four years later and was appointed mayor in 1997. During his term, the city charter was revised to allow for open election of the mayor. However, in the first citywide mayoral election, Holden was defeated by former Councilmember and former Pasadena mayor Bill Bogaard.

Holden previously served as the assembly majority floor leader.

Holden is a member of the California Legislative Progressive Caucus.

After leaving the Assembly, Holden joined LA Fire Justice. Although he is the CEO, the attorney responsible for the firm is Doug Boxer, son of former US senator Barbara Boxer. LA Fire Justice has sued Southern California Edison on behalf of those whose properties were destroyed by the Eaton Fire, as well as Genasys on behalf of a woman who was killed due to delayed evacuation notices in western Altadena.

== Electoral history ==
2012 California's 41st State Assembly district election
Primary election
| Party | Candidate | Votes | % |
|---|---|---|---|
| Democratic | Chris Holden | 20,718 | 29.4 |
| Republican | Donna Lowe | 16,808 | 23.8 |
| Republican | Ed Colton | 12,399 | 17.6 |
| Democratic | Michael Cacciotti | 10,844 | 15.4 |
| Democratic | Victoria Rusnak | 9,727 | 13.8 |
| Total votes | | 70,496 | 100.0 |
General election
| Democratic | Chris Holden | 109,743 | 57.7 |
| Republican | Donna Lowe | 80,362 | 42.3 |
| Total votes | | 190,105 | 100.0 |
| Democratic hold | | | |

2014 California's 41st State Assembly district election
Primary election
| Party | Candidate | Votes | % |
|---|---|---|---|
| Democratic | Chris Holden (incumbent) | 35,296 | 98.1 |
| Republican | Nathaniel Tsai (write-in) | 394 | 1.1 |
| Republican | Samuel S. Forsen (write-in) | 120 | 0.3 |
| Libertarian | Ted Brown (write-in) | 84 | 0.2 |
| Republican | Linda Hazelton (write-in) | 83 | 0.2 |
| Total votes | | 35,977 | 100.0 |
General election
| Democratic | Chris Holden (incumbent) | 62,810 | 59.3 |
| Republican | Nathaniel Tsai | 43,126 | 40.7 |
| Total votes | | 105,936 | 100.0 |
| Democratic hold | | | |

2016 California's 41st State Assembly district election
Primary election
| Party | Candidate | Votes | % |
|---|---|---|---|
| Democratic | Chris Holden (incumbent) | 66,951 | 59.2 |
| Republican | Casey C. Higgins | 30,017 | 26.6 |
| Republican | Dan M. Taylor | 8,891 | 7.8 |
| Independent | Alan Reynolds | 7,143 | 6.3 |
| Total votes | | 113,002 | 100.0 |
General election
| Democratic | Chris Holden (incumbent) | 120,633 | 64.5 |
| Republican | Casey C. Higgins | 78,817 | 39.5 |
| Total votes | | 119,450 | 100.0 |
| Democratic hold | | | |

2018 California's 41st State Assembly district election
Primary election
| Party | Candidate | Votes | % |
|---|---|---|---|
| Democratic | Chris Holden (incumbent) | 54,707 | 59.8 |
| Independent | Alan Reynolds | 25,345 | 27.7 |
| Democratic | Kenny Rotter | 11,420 | 12.5 |
| Total votes | | 91,472 | 100.0 |
General election
| Democratic | Chris Holden (incumbent) | 113,439 | 64.2 |
| Independent | Alan Reynolds | 63,272 | 35.8 |
| Total votes | | 176,711 | 100.0 |
| Democratic hold | | | |

2020 California's 41st State Assembly district election
Primary election
| Party | Candidate | Votes | % |
|---|---|---|---|
| Democratic | Chris Holden (incumbent) | 94,505 | 68.7 |
| Republican | Robin A. Hvidston | 43,006 | 31.3 |
| Total votes | | 137,511 | 100.0 |
General election
| Democratic | Chris Holden (incumbent) | 160,878 | 65.3 |
| Republican | Robin A. Hvidson | 85,604 | 34.7 |
| Total votes | | 246,482 | 100.0 |
| Democratic hold | | | |

2022 California's 41st State Assembly district election
Primary election
| Party | Candidate | Votes | % |
|---|---|---|---|
| Democratic | Chris Holden (incumbent) | 74,735 | 96.7 |
| Republican | Michael McMahon (write in) | 2,580 | 3.3 |
| Total votes | | 77,315 | 100.0 |
General election
| Democratic | Chris Holden (incumbent) | 104,740 | 60.0 |
| Republican | Michael McMahon | 69,835 | 40.0 |
| Total votes | | 174,575 | 100.0 |
| Democratic hold | | | |

== Legislation ==
In his first term, Holden introduced legislation to require California schools to teach about the significance of the Barack Obama presidency. He introduced legislation to tackle the problem of grease thievery at restaurants. He also introduced legislation to study and foster economic development and job creation.

Holden also has been a leader in the legislation to address California's wildfire crisis. He passed into law successful legislation on the topic, and was a lead negotiator during the process.

== See also ==
- African American mayors in California
