= Pasadena High School (California) =

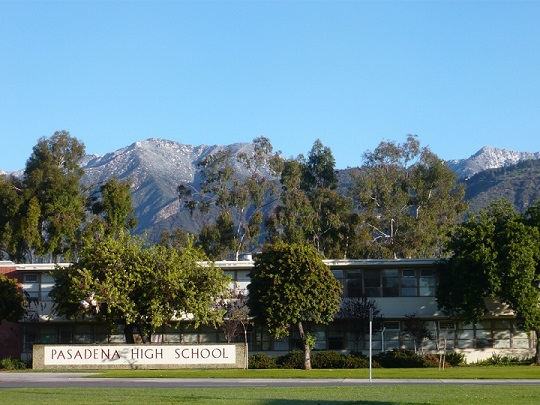

Location
- 2925 E. Sierra Madre Blvd. Pasadena, Los Angeles County, California 91107; United States; 34.162005°N 118.091794°W

Information
- Type: Public, secondary school
- Opened: 1884; 142 years ago
- School district: Pasadena Unified School District
- NCES School ID: 062994004684
- Principal: Eric M Barba
- Teaching staff: 74.00 (FTE) (2023-2024)
- Grades: 9-12
- Gender: coeducational
- Enrollment: 1,355 (2023-2024)
- Student to teacher ratio: 18.31 (2023-2024)
- Colors: Red; White
- Athletics conference: CIF Southern Section Pacific League
- Mascot: The Bulldogs
- Rival: John Muir
- Accreditation: WASC
- Newspaper: The Chronicle
- Website: phs.pusd.us
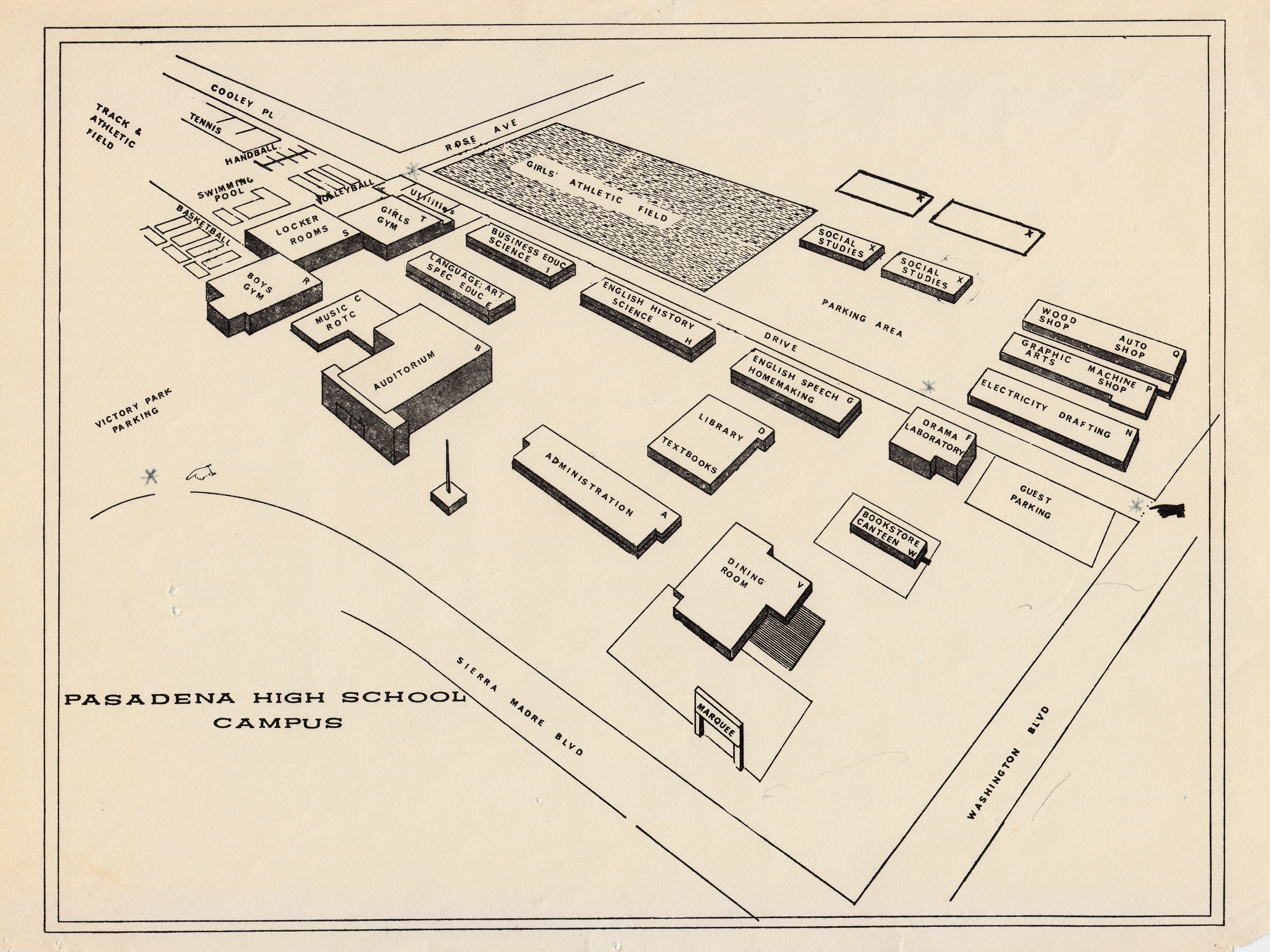
- Last updated: April 22, 2019; 7 years ago

Pasadena High School (PHS) is a public high school in Pasadena, California. It is one of four high schools in the Pasadena Unified School District.

== History ==
The school was first established as a district school in 1884 and became Pasadena High School in 1891. In 1928, the school merged into Pasadena Junior College and operated as a four-year school, grades 11, 12, 13 and 14. Pasadena realigned its 6-4-4 school system in 1954 with Pasadena High School regaining its separate identity. PHS, however, shared the Pasadena City College Colorado Boulevard campus through the graduating class of 1960 when PHS moved to its present campus on Sierra Madre Boulevard at Washington Boulevard.

The Rose Parade, post parade Showcase of Floats takes place in front of the high school utilizing some of the school grounds and parking lots.

Pasadena High School's athletic field was renovated, adding light towers, a new track and replacing the grass field with artificial turf. It opened at the start of the 2009-10 school year. The school's junior varsity and varsity football teams as well as the boys' and girls' soccer teams play their home games on the field. The school also is used for its track meets in the spring.

On January 8, 2019, Pasadena High School opened the renovated Tom Hamilton Gymnasium at the cost of $19 million. It is used for boys and girls junior varsity and varsity basketball teams and the girls volleyball team for their home games.

On February 7, 2025, students at Pasadena High School staged a walkout alongside four other nearby high schools.

The school's auditorium is named after Gladiss Edwards, who was the principal during the late 1950s and into the 1960s.

== Student profile ==
In the 2022-23 school year, Pasadena High School's student population consisted of 1,609 students, with 53.9% of students being Latino, 19.6% white, 12.3% African-American, and 7.7% Asian, 0.3% Native Hawaiian/Pacific Islander, and 0.4% American Indian/Alaska Native.

== Academics ==
Pasadena High School offers several special unique programs. The Graphic Communications Academy was established in partnership with the Printing Industry of Southern California and Pasadena City College. The Visual Arts and Design Academy is linked with the Art Center College of Design, Pasadena City College and the Pasadena Art Armory. The Center for Independent Study program is a remedial program to help students who are behind in credits. PHS also offers a career pathway called the App Academy, which helps students learn about web design.

== Sports ==
=== Turkey Tussle ===
Pasadena High School competes against John Muir High School at the Rose Bowl in a football game known as the Turkey Tussle. The tradition began in 1947, and Muir leads the series 42-18-2.

== NJROTC ==
Pasadena High School also has a NNDCC unit, which is a non-funded version of the US Navy's NJROTC program. Pasadena High School has had a Reserves Officer's Training Corps since 1920 starting as Army but has also been Air Force and Marines as well in the past. They disbanded in 2017-2018 academic year.

== Notable alumni ==
- Robert Armstrong, 1968, cartoonist, known for creating Mickey Rat who popularized the term "couch potato"
- Louise Beavers, 1920, Actress
- Walt Becker, 1986, film director, "Van Wilder," "Wild Dogs," "Old Dogs (film)"
- Armon Binns, 2011, NFL player
- Mario Clark, NFL cornerback
- Carol Cleveland, 1960, actress, associated with Monty Python's Flying Circus TV show
- Mike Connelly, 1952, NFL lineman, Dallas Cowboys
- Michael Cooper, 1974, basketball player and coach, 5-time NBA champion, WNBA head coach
- Donald D. Engen, 1941, US Navy Vice Admiral, former Administrator of Federal Aviation Administration and Director of National Air and Space Museum
- Bob Eubanks, 1955, radio-TV personality, host of The Newlywed Game and longtime broadcaster of Rose Parade
- Victor Gordo, 1987, Pasadena City Councilmember (2001-2020), 55th Mayor of Pasadena (2020-)
- Howard Hawks, 1914, Hollywood film director (Scarface, Gentlemen Prefer Blondes, Rio Bravo)
- Chris Holden, 1978, 53rd Mayor of Pasadena, city councilman (District 3) (1989–2012), California State Assemblyman, 41st District (2012–2024)
- Michael Holton, 1979, basketball player and ESPN analyst
- Chidi Iwuoma, 1996, NFL Player
- Payton Jordan, Hall of Fame Olympic track coach and Masters track and field world record holder
- Kathryn Le Veque, 1982, bestselling historical romance fiction author and publisher
- María de López, Californian suffragette
- Samuel Lunden, architect
- Jim Matheny, UCLA and professional football player
- Chris McAlister, 1995, NFL Player
- Edwin McMillan, co-recipient of 1951 Nobel Prize in Chemistry
- Zephyr Moore Ramsey, African American lawyer
- Charley Paddock, two-time Olympic champion, "fastest man in the world"
- Matteo Paz, 2025, astronomer
- William H. Press, 1965, astrophysicist and 165th president of American Association for the Advancement of Science
- QUIÑ (Bianca Quiñones), singer
- Angelica Salas, immigration activist
- James Sanford, 1980 world's fastest human
- Stan Smith, 1964, tennis player and two-time Grand Slam singles champion
- May Sutton, tennis player, winner of singles title at U.S. National Championships and Wimbledon
- Bill Sweek, 1964, basketball player and coach
- Jerry Tarkanian, ~1948, college basketball coach, NCAA champion and Hall of Famer
- Kevin Tighe, 1962, actor Emergency!
- Lester Towns, 1995, NFL player
- James Turrell, 1961, an American artist known for his work within the Light and Space movement
- Alex Van Halen, 1972, member of rock band Van Halen
- Eddie Van Halen, 1973, founding member of Van Halen
- Lee Walls, Major League Baseball outfielder
- Cynthia Whitcomb, 1969, television writer and playwright
- Dick Williams, 1947, former Major League Baseball player and manager
- Dick Railsback, 1964, former American pole vaulter
