= Richard Katz (politician) =

American politician

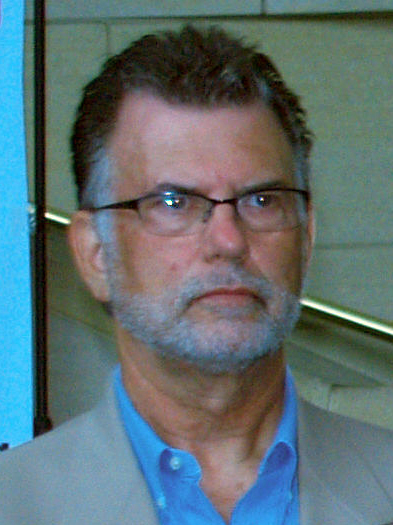
- Katz in 2012

Minority Leader of the California Assembly
- In office September 14, 1995 – November 30, 1996
- Preceded by: Willie Brown
- Succeeded by: Curt Pringle

Member of the California State Assembly from the 39th district
- In office December 1, 1980 – November 30, 1996
- Preceded by: J. Robert Hayes
- Succeeded by: Tony Cárdenas

Personal details
- Born: August 16, 1950 (age 76) Los Angeles, California
- Party: Democratic

Richard Katz (born August 16, 1950) is an American former politician. A member of the Democratic Party, Katz served in the California State Assembly for the 39th district from 1980 until 1996. Katz was Minority Leader of the Assembly between 1995 and 1996 being the most recent Democrat to hold the office, as Democrats have held a majority since 1996. As Democratic leader he led the effort to take back the house in California. He also ran in the 1993 Los Angeles mayoral election, with James Carville serving as a consultant for his campaign. He still has an active role in political consulting throughout California.

== 1998 Election ==
Katz attempted a legislative comeback in 1998, narrowly losing the primary for the 20th Senate district to LA City Councilman Richard Alarcon.

== Post Assembly career ==
Katz was a major proponent of the San Fernando Valley secession movement—cochairing the failed Measure F, an initiative effort that appeared on the 2002 ballot.

An ally of Los Angeles Mayor Antonio Villaraigosa, he was Villaraigosa's public appointee to the Los Angeles County Metropolitan Transportation Authority board and Metrolink board chair. Although he supported City Controller Wendy Greuel's candidacy for mayor in 2013, Katz was appointed to the city planning commission by the successful candidate, Mayor Eric Garcetti.

Katz was appointed to the Los Angeles Board of Water and Power Commissioners on March 22, 2024 and was elected its President at his first meeting in that position five days later.

Preceded by J. Robert Hayes	California State Assemblymember, 39th District; December 1, 1980 - November 30, 1996	Succeeded by Tony Cardenas
Preceded by Willie Brown	Minority Leader of the California State Assembly; September 14, 1995 - November 30, 1996	Succeeded by Curt Pringle
