= 1993 Los Angeles mayoral election =

- April 20, 1993 and June 8, 1993
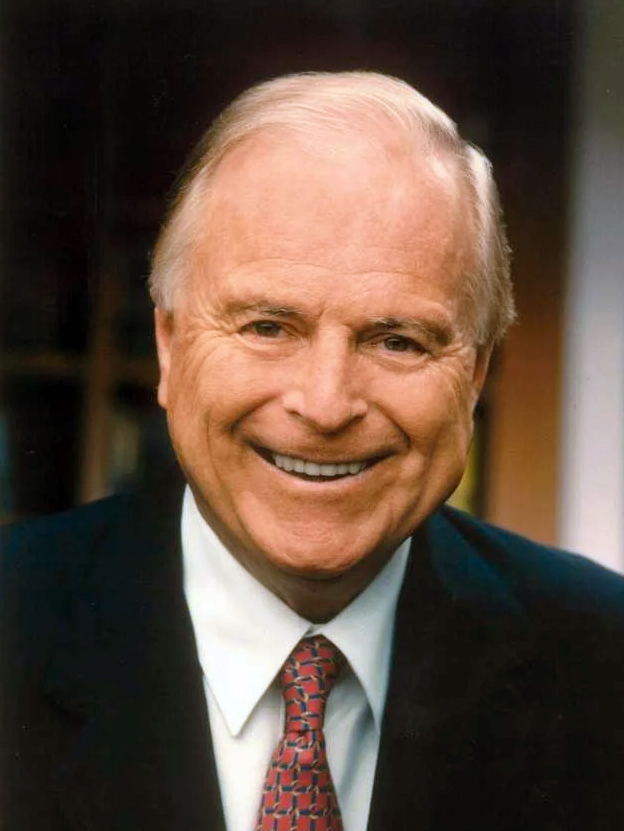

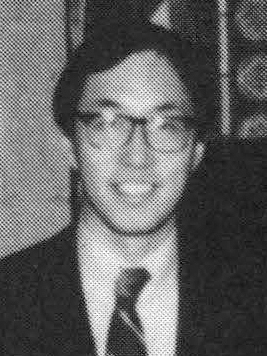

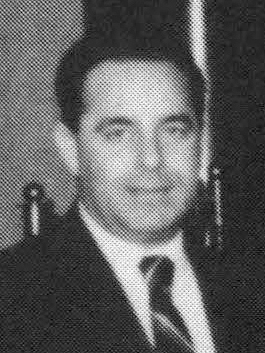

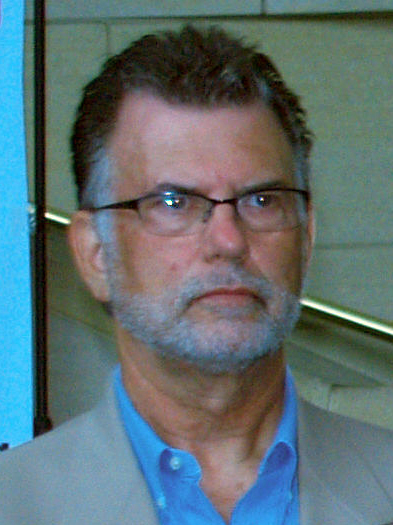

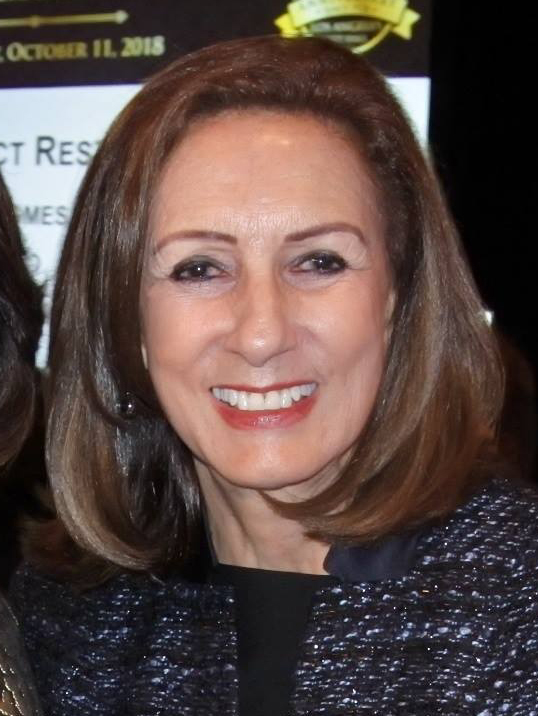
Candidate	Richard Riordan	Michael Woo	Joel Wachs
First round	158,527; 33.42%	113,913; 24.01%	52,221; 11.01%
Runoff	314,559; 53.94%	268,137; 46.06%	Eliminated
Candidate	Richard Katz	Linda Griego
First round	46,163; 9.73%	34,227; 7.22%
Runoff	Eliminated	Eliminated
Mayor before election
Tom Bradley
Elected Mayor
Richard Riordan

The 1993 Los Angeles mayoral election took place on April 20, 1993, with a run-off election on June 8, 1993. This was the first race in 64 years that an incumbent was not on the ballot. It marked the first time in 24 years that retiring Mayor Tom Bradley was not on the ballot, after five consecutive victories starting in 1973. Richard Riordan became the first Republican mayor elected in 36 years.

Municipal elections in California, including Mayor of Los Angeles, are officially nonpartisan; candidates' party affiliations do not appear on the ballot.

== Candidates ==
- Kim Allen
- Eileen Anderson, perennial candidate
- Philip Ashamallah
- Ernari Bernardi, member of the Los Angeles City Council from Van Nuys
- John Borunda
- Adam Bregman
- Douglas Carlton
- "Melrose" Larry Green
- Linda Griego, deputy mayor of Los Angeles
- Ted Hayes
- Nate Holden, member of the Los Angeles City Council from Crenshaw and candidate for mayor in 1989
- Tom Houston
- Richard Katz, state assemblyman
- Michael A. Leptuch
- Julian Nava, former United States ambassador to Mexico and former member of the Los Angeles Unified School District board of education
- Nick Patsaouras
- Randy Pavelko
- Richard Riordan, attorney, businessman, and philanthropist
- J. Stanley Sanders
- Leonard Shapiro
- Frank Teran
- Oscar Valdes
- Joel Wachs, member of the Los Angeles City Council from Studio City and candidate for mayor in 1973
- Michael Woo, member of the Los Angeles City Council from Silver Lake

=== Declined ===
- Tom Bradley, incumbent mayor since 1973 and Democratic nominee for governor in 1982 and 1986

== Campaign ==
After the retirement of Tom Bradley, the seat was open for the first time since the 1929 election when incumbent George E. Cryer retired. Many city council members ran for the post, including Michael Woo, Joel Wachs, Nate Holden, and Ernani Bernardi. Other local area politicians, including Assemblyman Richard Katz, Deputy Mayor Linda Greigo, and Board of Recreation and Parks Commissioner Richard Riordan.

Riordan spent $4.2 million during the campaign, with much of the donations to him from the more conservative San Fernando Valley, Westside, and Harbor area. In the primary election, Riordan and Woo advanced to the runoff.

Riordan and Woo criticized each other over their ability to fight crime and about the economy, with Riordan calling Woo a career politician and Woo saying that Riordan was a "symbol of 1980s greed." In the runoff election, Riordan defeated Woo, with the Jewish population in Los Angeles seen by some as the defining factor for Riordan's win. Some newspapers also said that Riordan's hiring of gay staffers helped bolster the vote from gay and lesbians in the city as well.

== Results ==
=== Primary election ===
Los Angeles mayoral primary election, April 20, 1993
Candidate	Votes	%
Richard Riordan	158,527	33.42
Michael Woo	113,913	24.01
Joel Wachs	52,221	11.01
Richard Katz	46,163	9.73
Linda Griego	34,227	7.22
J. Stanley Sanders	20,077	4.23
Nate Holden	16,166	3.41
Nick Patsaouras	8,352	1.76
Julian Nava	6,705	1.41
Ernani Bernardi	4,735	1.00
Tom Houston	3,538	0.75
Ted Hayes	2,966	0.63
John Borunda	1,118	0.24
Oscar Valdes	811	0.17
Eileen Anderson	794	0.17
"Melrose" Larry Green	676	0.14
Adam Bregman	643	0.14
Randy Pavelko	638	0.13
Leonard Shapiro	554	0.12
Kim Allen	479	0.10
Michael A. Leptuch	335	0.07
Frank Teran	335	0.07
Douglas Carlton	201	0.04
Philip Ashamallah	192	0.04
Total votes	474,366	100.00

=== General election ===
Los Angeles mayoral general election, June 8, 1993
Candidate	Votes	%
Richard Riordan	314,559	53.94
Michael Woo	268,137	46.06
Total votes	582,696	100.00
