= Victor Gordo =

Mayor of Pasadena, California

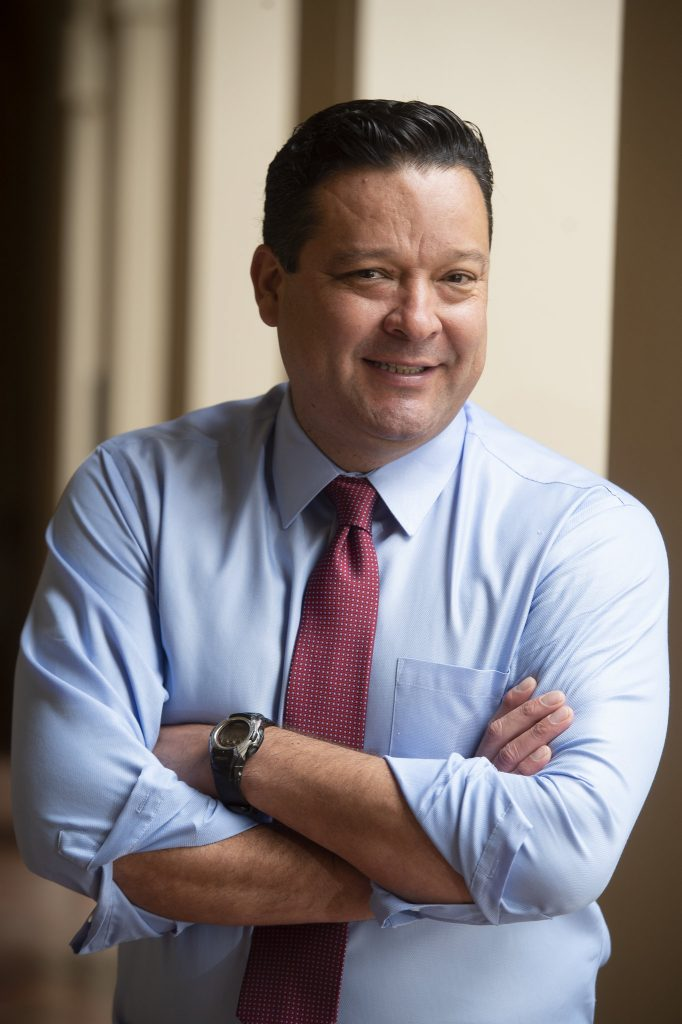

56th Mayor of Pasadena
- Incumbent
- Assumed office December 8, 2020
- Preceded by: Terry Tornek

Personal details
- Born: October 1969 (age 56–57) Zacatecas, Mexico
- Party: Democratic
- Spouse: Kelly Van Dyke
- Children: 2
- Education: Pasadena City College (A.A.); Azusa Pacific University (B.A.); University of La Verne College of Law (J.D.)
- Profession: Attorney

Victor Manuel Gordo (born October 1969) is an American politician and the mayor of Pasadena, California.

== Early life and career ==
Gordo was born in Zacatecas, Mexico to a family of six. He moved to Pasadena when he was a child and was a paperboy for Pasadena Star-News from age 9–17. His father was a dishwasher and cook at a local Mexican restaurant. His mother was a seamstress. He attended Pasadena High School where he played football, soccer, and baseball. He obtained his Associate degree at Pasadena City College. He matriculated to get his Bachelor's degree in Finance at Azusa Pacific University and Juris Doctor at University of La Verne College of Law. He was admitted to the California Bar in 2001. Prior to being elected mayor, Gordo was on the Pasadena City Council and represented District 5. He also was the longest-serving president of the Rose Bowl Operating Company.

== Mayoralty ==
Gordo is a member of the Democratic Party. In the March 3rd, 2020 Primary nominating election, he received 46.52% of the vote, against the incumbent Terry Tornek who received 41.57% of the vote. He was elected mayor after the runoff on November 3, taking office December 8. He is Pasadena's first Latino mayor.

On July 17, 2024, Gordo became the first Democratic mayor in California to publicly call on President Joe Biden to end his campaign for the presidency.

He was re-elected in 2024 after beating challenger Allen Shay.

As Mayor of Pasadena, Gordo appears in Pasadena's annual New Year's Rose Parade.

=== Sister Cities ===
As Mayor, Gordo has worked to develop sister city relationships between Pasadena and other municipalities. In 2024, he visited and met with Armenian President Vahagn Khachaturyan to discuss a potential sister city relationship. In 2025, Gordo hosted Samantha Smith Gutiérrez, Presidenta Municipal of Guanajuato, Mexico at Pasadena's city hall in an effort to develop a sister city relationship between the two cities.

== Personal life ==
Gordo is married to Kelly Van Dyke, a school teacher. They live in the Madison Heights section of Pasadena and have two adult children.
