= Kathryn Le Veque =

American novelist

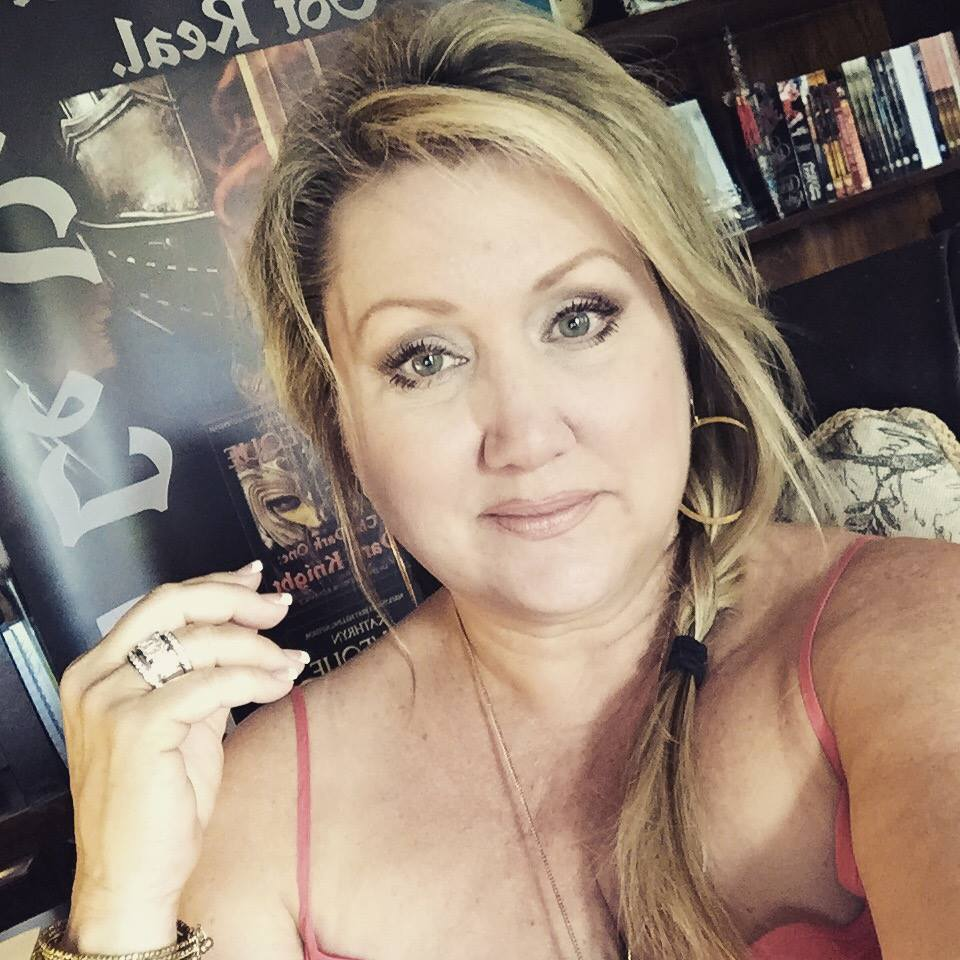
- Education: University of Southern California
- Website: kathrynleveque.com

Kathryn Elizabeth Bouse Le Veque Hogan is an American USA Today bestselling independent author of Historical Romance fiction novels. She is the author of over 100 published Historical and Contemporary romance novels. She is most known for writing the successful de Wolfe Pack series, including Warwolfe, The Wolfe, Nighthawk, Serpent, and A Wolfe Among Dragons.

== Early life and education ==
Le Veque was born in 1964 in Glendale, California and was raised in Pasadena, California, graduating from Pasadena High School in 1982. She started writing as a hobby when she was thirteen, and continued throughout high school and college, attending the University of Southern California.

== Career ==
Le Veque continued writing throughout high school, college, and while working full-time and raising her two children. When she was 28, she started submitting her works to traditional publishers, but was rejected due to her chosen genre not being considered "marketable enough" by them at the time. With the rise in independent publishing on Amazon's Kindle platform in the early-2010s, on a whim, she uploaded her first novel for purchase on Amazon in May, 2012. One year later, due to the growing success of her novels, she was able to quit her day job, and focus on her writing full time.

In October, 2014, Le Veque was listed as the 31st "Most Read" author on Amazon. Her book as part of the anthology, With Dreams Only of You was a USA Today bestselling book in July, 2015. Since 2015, Le Veque has gone on to hit the USA Today Bestselling list 31 times.

Kathryn became CEO and Publisher of Dragonblade Publishing, Inc., a boutique publishing house specializing in Historical Romance with The New York Times and USA Today Bestselling authors. Kathryn also formed WolfeBane Publishing when Kindle Worlds (Amazon) folded to continue publishing the connected World of de Wolfe Pack. She also manages the de Lyon shared universe with multiple authors.

== Partial bibliography ==
=== De Wolfe Pack ===
- Warwolfe
- The Wolfe
- Nighthawk
- ShadowWolfe
- DarkWolfe
- A Joyous de Wolfe Christmas
- BlackWolfe
- Serpent
- A Wolfe Among Dragons
- Scorpion
- StormWolfe
- Dark Destroyer
- The Lion of the North
- Walls of Babylon

=== Dragonblade series ===
- Dragonblade
- The Savage Curtain
- Island of Glass
- The Fallen One
- Fragments of Grace

=== The de Shera Brotherhood: Lords of Thunder ===
- The Thunder Knight
- The Thunder Lord
- The Thunder Warrior

=== Reign of the House of de Winter ===
- Swords and Shields
- Lespada

=== The DeRusse Legacy ===
- The Dark One: Dark Knight
- The White Lord of Wellesbourne
- Lord of War: Black Angel
- Beast

=== De Lohr Dynasty ===
- Rise of the Defender
- Archangel
- Steelheart
- Spectre of the Sword (House of du Bois)
- Unending Love (House of du Bois)

=== Standalone books ===
- Lord of the Shadows
- Highland Wishes
- The Questing
- The Whispering Night
- Guardian of Darkness
- Devil's Dominion
- Netherworld
- Tender is the Knight
- Black Sword
- While Angels Slept
- The Crusader Saxon Lords of Hage book 1
- Kingdom Come Saxon Lords of Hage book 2
- Lord of War: Black Angel
- The Dark Lord
- With Dreams Only of You
