= Blair High School (Pasadena, California) =

Public high school in California, United States

Coordinates: 34.126413°N 118.146227°W

Location
- 1201 S Marengo Ave; Pasadena, California 91106; United States

Information
- Type: Public
- Motto: The Few, The Proud, The Vikings
- Established: 1964
- Principal: Amy McGinnis
- Teaching staff: 58.16 (FTE)
- Grades: 6th–12th
- Enrollment: 1,055 (2023–2024)
- Student to teacher ratio: 18.14
- Colors: Green and gold
- Athletics conference: CIF-SS Rio Hondo League
- Mascot: Viking
- Website: blair.pusd.us

Blair High School is a public high school in Pasadena, California, a part of the Pasadena Unified School District (PUSD). Blair is an International Baccalaureate World School serving grades 6–12. Blair offers the International Baccalaureate (IB) Middle Years Programme and the IB Diploma Programme.

== History ==
In 2017, Blair also added the IB career-related Programme, as part of Blair's Health Careers Academy. The school underwent a major academic overhaul beginning in the fall of 2003 as a result of substandard academic performance, which prompted a state review. The school's two "co-principals" were replaced with a single principal, Rich Boccia (an administrative official with the Pasadena Unified School District, and district employee since 1980), who had been principal at South Pasadena Middle School. During Boccia's tenure, school wide academic performance rose sharply as a result of several academic reforms and in 2005 Boccia was named Secondary School Principal of the Year for the State of California for his leadership success at turning around Blair.

During the 2005–2006 school year, Blair was one of many PUSD schools threatened to be shut down due to budget cuts. However, a strong showing of community support convinced the Pasadena school board to keep Blair open. Students, parents (both with enrolled children, and those considering Blair), and various local figures attended school board meetings in large numbers to support Blair. The parents and community also advocated strongly for the smaller, more manageable size of the campus, the then 7th–12th configuration (now 6–12) which allows for longer buy-in time for families and the fact that Blair is authorized to offer the IB Diploma Programme in addition to the Middle Year's Programme. Blair is the only PUSD secondary school located in the Southwest part of Pasadena.

Blair's "C" Campus was torn down in the spring of 2005, with the intent of rebuilding (it was deemed less expensive to rebuild than to renovate the existing building). The Measure Y bond monies earmarked for that project were subsequently depleted in overages at other PUSD sites. In November 2008, voters approved Measure TT bond monies, and Blair's "C" campus was rebuilt. The new building opened in 2011, and primarily houses the middle school program.

Blair West is located across the street from the Pasadena Public Library's Allendale branch. Renovation is underway on Blair's main building, the "A" building, Blair West campus on the west side of Marengo Avenue. Construction is scheduled to be completed in December 2018. During construction, the main offices and high school classes are using the former Allendale Elementary school campus (1135 S. Euclid Avenue). The gymnasium and athletic facilities are located on Marengo Avenue. Construction is funded by Measure TT.

In addition to the International Baccalaureate Programme, Blair is known for its Health Careers Academy. The Health Careers Academy is the oldest of PUSD's College and Career Pathways, having been established in the early 1980s, and now offers the International Baccalaureate Career-related Programme. Blair offers PUSD's middle school and high school Spanish Dual Language Immersion program, and is also home to the district's International Academy (for newcomers to the country). PUSD offers an open enrollment process, and 80% of Blair's students attend Blair on permit. Over 100 students come from cities outside the PUSD attendance zone. The IB programme is cited by many of these non-PUSD families as the reason they chose Blair.

On February 6, 2019, the high school campus completed its $28.4 million renovation project. In a ceremony with the presence of the Mayor of Pasadena, Terry Tornek, the Superintendent of Schools, Dr. Brian McDonald, and current and former teachers and alumni. The three-floor classroom building will have 23 classrooms, an expanded office area, a remodeled library, a new main entrance and a new track and athletic field. This project was funded by the school district's voters during the November 2008 election (Measure TT), which is used to renovate all the school campuses within the Pasadena Unified School District.

On February 7, 2025, students at Blair High School, staged a walkout alongside four other nearby high schools. Students walked to city hall and stayed there until sundown in protest of the new immigration policies that had been signed into law.

== Athletics ==
Blair's Middle School offers a variety of sports as part of the after-school LEARNS program with competitive teams in basketball, soccer and flag football.

Blair offers a variety of sports, including soccer, track, swimming, softball, cross-country, volleyball, water polo, and tennis.

== Notable alumni ==
- Michael Dorn (1971) – Actor known for CHiPs and Star Trek: The Next Generation
- Bob Fisher – Former NFL player
- Jonathan Jackson – Attended 1969–1970
- Kermit Johnson – Former NFL player
- Shelly Johnson (1977) – Cinematographer, Captain America: The First Avenger Jurassic Park 3 Greyhound
- Megan Marshall – Pulitzer Prize winning author, 1971
- Gerardo Ortiz (2007) – Pasadena based corridos singer, winner of Premio lo Nuestro for best new artist
- John Singleton (1986) – Movie writer and director, credits include Boyz n the Hood
- Sean Smith (2005) – Former NFL cornerback for the Kansas City Chiefs
- Petra Verkaik (1984) – Playboy Playmate Miss December 1989, known for the most appearances in Playboy of all time
- Khalyla Kuhn (1998–2002) – Co-host of Tigerbelly Podcast
- Sueco (2014) – Rapper and producer
- Diamond McNeil - Film Executive (credits include Sinners, Wonka, and more)
