= J. Robert Hayes =

American politician

Member of the California State Assembly from the 39th district
- In office December 4, 1978 – November 30, 1980
- Preceded by: Jim Keysor
- Succeeded by: Richard Katz

Personal details
- Born: February 28, 1932 (age 94) Glendale, California, U.S.
- Party: Republican
- Education: Los Angeles City College

J. Robert Hayes (born February 28, 1932) is an American politician. He served as a Republican member for the 39th district of the California State Assembly.

Hayes was born in Glendale, California. Hayes went to school in Los Angeles, and then attended Los Angeles City College. Hayes served in the United States Navy and the United States Marine Corps Reserve. In 1978, he was elected for the 39th district of the California State Assembly. Hayes succeeded Jim Keysor. In 1980, he was succeeded by Richard Katz.
