= Tom C. Carrell =

American politician

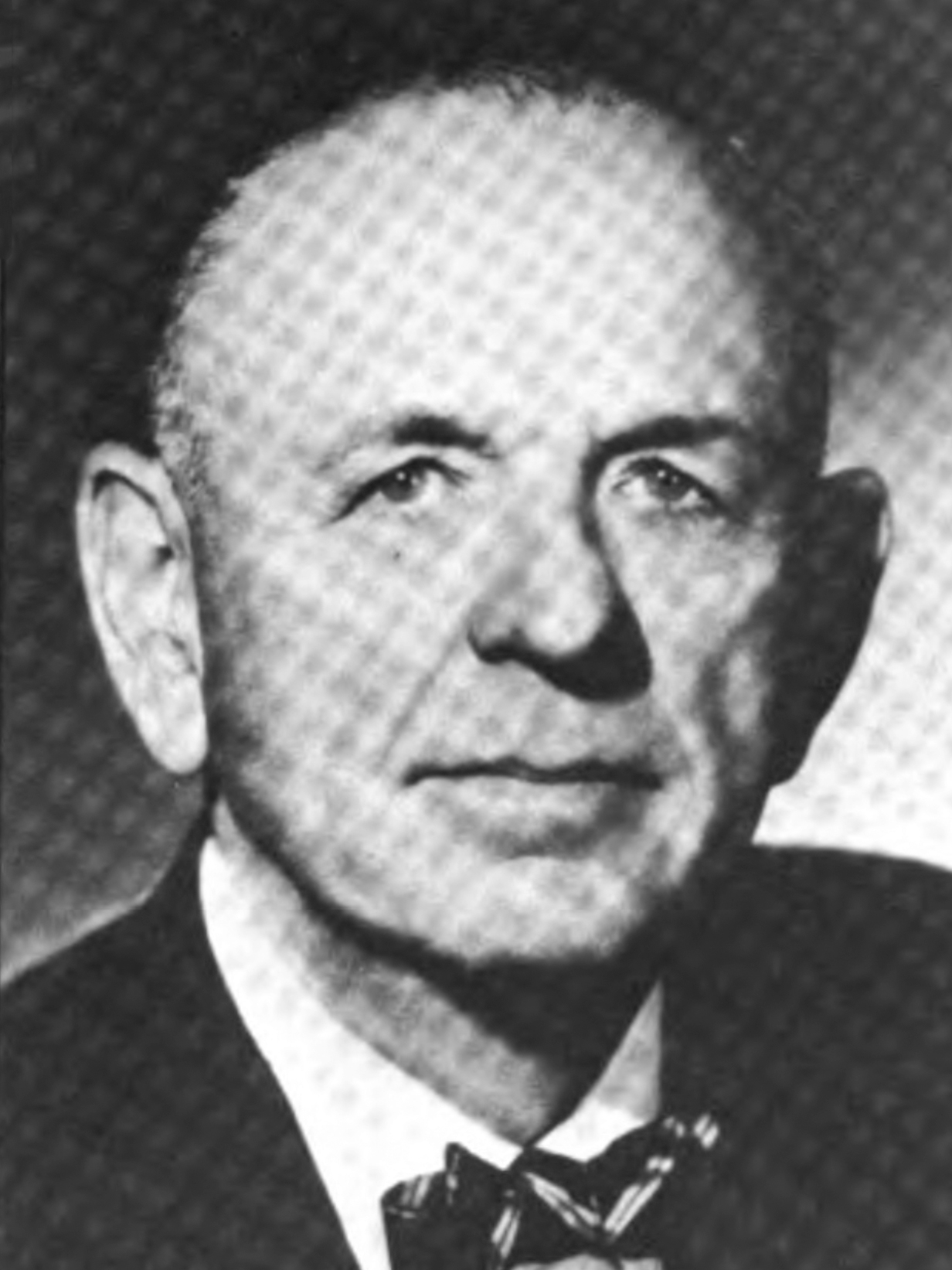

Member of the California Senate from the 22nd district
- In office January 2, 1967 – October 15, 1972
- Preceded by: Hugh P. Donnelly
- Succeeded by: Alan Robbins

Member of the California State Assembly from the 41st district
- In office December 30, 1959 – January 2, 1967
- Preceded by: Allen Miller
- Succeeded by: David Negri

Personal details
- Born: July 10, 1900 Cooper, Texas
- Died: October 15, 1972 (aged 72) Honolulu, Hawaii
- Party: Democratic
- Spouse(s): Dolphia Carmack
- Children: 1

Military service
- Branch/service: United States Army
- Battles/wars: World War II

Tom Cumming Carrell (July 10, 1900 – October 15, 1972) was an American politician.

== Early life ==
Carrell was born on July 10, 1900, in Cooper, Texas. He graduated from the University of California, Los Angeles (UCLA) and he received a master's degree in education from the University of Southern California.

== Career ==
During World War II, he served in the United States Army.

Carrell as a Democratic member of the California State Assembly for the 41st district from 1959 to 1967, and the California State Senate for the 22nd district from 1967 to 1972. As state senator, he objected to Southern California Edison's chairman Jack K. Horton's plan to increase electricity rates by 16% in 1971.

== Death ==
Carrell died on October 15, 1972, in Honolulu, Hawaii.
