= William Thum =

American politician (1861–1941)

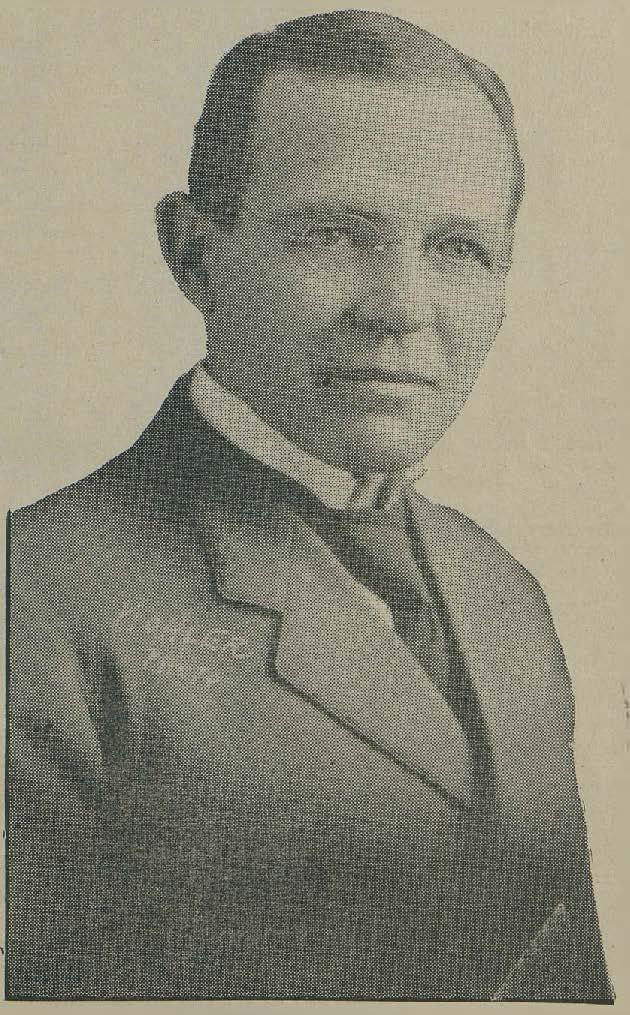

15th Mayor of Pasadena
- In office 1911–1913
- Preceded by: Thomas Earley
- Succeeded by: Richard Lee Metcalf

Personal details
- Born: December 21, 1861 Michigan, US
- Died: May 10, 1941 (aged 79) Pasadena, California, US
- Party: Socialist Party of America; Republican
- Occupation: Chemist, inventor, politician

William Thum (December 21, 1861 – May 10, 1941) was an American politician who served as the 15th mayor of Pasadena, California, from 1911 to 1913.

== Early life ==
On December 21, 1861, Thum was born in Michigan. Thum's parents were William Thum (1824-1883) and Christina (nee Greiner) Thum (1825-1907).

== Career ==
Thum was a chemist. Thum was known for Tanglefoot, an adhesive fly-paper.

In 1911, Thum became mayor of Pasadena, California, until 1913.

During Thum's administration, Pasadena assumed control of the city's water system.

== Personal life ==
Thum's wife was Margaret Thum. They had two children. On May 10, 1941, Thum died in Pasadena, California. Thum is buried at Hollywood Forever Cemetery in Los Angeles, California.
