= Jim Keysor =

American politician

Member of the California State Assembly from the 39th district
- In office December 2, 1974 – November 30, 1978
- Preceded by: Bill Bond
- Succeeded by: J. Robert Hayes

Member of the California State Assembly from the 41st district
- In office January 4, 1971 – November 30, 1974
- Preceded by: Henry Arklin
- Succeeded by: Michael D. Antonovich

Personal details
- Born: December 10, 1927 Salt Lake City, Utah
- Died: February 13, 2014 (aged 86) Capistrano Beach, California
- Party: Democratic
- Spouse: Patricia Williams
- Children: 4

Military service
- Branch/service: United States Army
- Battles/wars: World War II

James Brian Keysor (December 10, 1927 – February 13, 2014) served, from 1970 to 1974, in the California State Legislature, representing the 41st State Assembly District.

== Career ==
During World War II, Keysor served in the United States Army. Had earned a B.S. degree at the University of California, Los Angeles and graduate work at San Fernando Valley State College. He was a member of the Church of Jesus Christ of Latter-day Saints and also a leader in the Boy Scouts of America.

When he began campaigning for office in the California State Assembly in 1969, he had been president of the Keysor-Century Corporation — parent of Century Record Manufacturing Company — both of which had been founded by his father, James Bernard ("Bud") Keysor Jr. (1906–2000).

He was the Chairman of the Special committee to investigate the Sylmar Tunnel Disaster and author of the Tunnel and Mine Safety Act of 1972.

== Personal life ==
Jim married Patricia Williams and together had four children; James (Bill nickname for middle name Williams), twins Susan and Karen, and Julie.

California Assembly
Preceded by Henry Zarch Arklin (born 1928) (Republican); 1968–1971	California State Assemblyman; 41st District; Jim Keysor (Democrat); 1971–1974	Succeeded by Michael D. Antonovich (Republican)
Preceded by William Benjamin Bond (1935–2005) (Republican); 1973–1974	California State Assemblyman; 39th District; Jim Keysor (Democrat); 1975–1978	Succeeded by James Robert Hayes (born 1932) (Republican); 1979–1980
