= Wilbur Woo =

Wilbur Woo (December 12, 1915 – November 12, 2012) was a Chinese-born American businessman, previous CACA national president, former vice-chairman of Cathay Bank and seen as a leader in the Los Angeles' Chinese community. Woo first stepped into America when he was just 5 years old with his family to escape China but later returned to his home country. In 1940, Woo returned to Los Angeles and graduated from UCLA. He was a Republican while his son, Michael Woo, is a Democrat who, in 1985, became the first Asian American elected to the Los Angeles City Council. Woo also deposited $200,000 for his son's Democratic campaign. He was close to President Richard Nixon when he was appointed in 1972 to raise profit's for Washington out of the Los Angeles Chinese community. He died after complications from a heart attack and pneumonia.
