= H. C. Kelsey =

American politician

Member of the California State Assembly from the 41st district
- In office January 3, 1927 - January 7, 1929
- Preceded by: Anna L. Saylor
- Succeeded by: Albert Henry Morgan Jr.

Personal details
- Born: June 30, 1889 Alameda County, California
- Died: July 10, 1958 (aged 69) Oakland, California
- Party: Republican

Military service
- Battles/wars: World War I

Harrison Carlos Kelsey (June 30, 1889 - July 10, 1958) served in the California State Assembly for the 41st district from 1927 to 1929. During World War I he served in the United States Army.
