= Henry Arklin =

American politician (1928–2025)

Member of the California State Assembly from the 41st district
- In office January 6, 1969 – January 4, 1971
- Preceded by: David Negri
- Succeeded by: Jim Keysor

Personal details
- Born: Henry Zare Arklin; July 17, 1928 Albany, California, U.S.
- Died: August 1, 2025 (aged 97)
- Party: Republican

Henry Zare Arklin (July 17, 1928 – August 1, 2025), also known as Hank Arklin, was an American politician. He served as Republican member for the 41st district of the California State Assembly.

== Life and career ==
Arklin was born in California on July 17, 1928. He was a businessman.

In 1968, Arklin was elected to represent the 41st district of the California State Assembly, succeeding David Negri. He served until 1971, when he was succeeded by Jim Keysor.

Arklin died August 1, 2025, at the age of 97.
