= Bill Paparian =

American politician (born 1949)

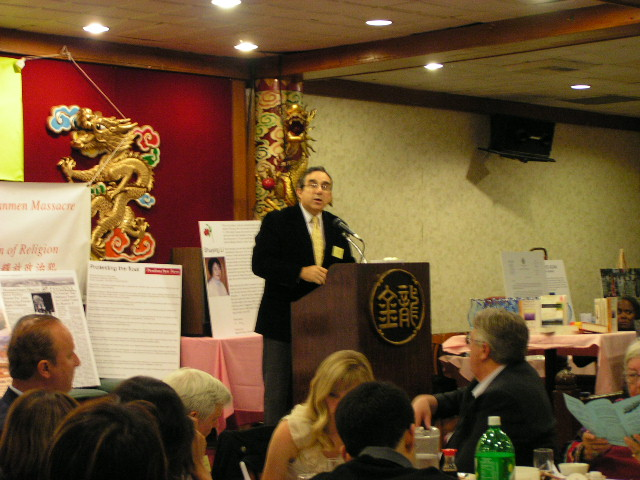
- Paparian at the Visual Artist Guild Awards

Mayor of Pasadena, California
- In office May 1995 – May 1997
- Preceded by: Katie Nack
- Succeeded by: Chris Holden

Personal details
- Born: 1949 (age 76–77) Los Angeles, California
- Party: Independent
- Other political affiliations: Green (2006); Republican (pre-1997)
- Education: California State University (B.A.); Southwestern University (J.D.)
- Profession: Attorney

William Mihrtad Paparian (born 1949 in Los Angeles, California) is an American politician, a former mayor of Pasadena, California, serving from 1995 to 1997. He was also a member of the Pasadena City Council from 1987 to 1999, and a Green Party candidate for Congress in 2006. He was the first Armenian-American mayor of Pasadena, as well as the only Pasadena mayor to visit Cuba during his term. Paparian has been known throughout his political career as an outspoken advocate of controversial causes, including ending the trade embargo against Cuba. He attracted national media attention for dispatching a Pasadena police helicopter to issue a citation to state aircraft spraying pesticides over the city, and for his urging Rose Parade observers in 2008 to turn their backs on the Chinese float, which he called the "Beijing Float of Shame."

== Early years ==
Paparian was raised in the Sherman Oaks section of the San Fernando Valley in the 1960s. He is the son of an Armenian immigrant mother and second generation Armenian-Irish-American father from Rhode Island. Paparian received his B.A. degree from California State University Northridge and later received his J.D. degree from Southwestern University School of Law. While attending California State University Northridge, he was a theater student who also protested the Vietnam War. Yet, he joined the U.S. Marine Corps in 1971 and was stationed at Camp Pendleton in San Diego County during the final years of the war. Years later, as Mayor of Pasadena, he was awarded the Outstanding Military Volunteer Service Medal by the Secretary of the Navy for his efforts as an elected public official on behalf of the military and veterans.

After being discharged from the Marine Corps, Paparian attended Southwestern University School of Law on the G.I. Bill and became an attorney. As a young attorney, he helped gain a medical furlough for Gourgen Yanikian, an Armenian immigrant convicted in the 1973 assassination of two Turkish diplomats, and defended Harry M. Sassounian, a Pasadena man found guilty in the fatal 1982 shooting of a Turkish consul.

He first achieved notoriety in 1987, when he unexpectedly unseated former Mayor Jo Heckman for her seat on the Board of City Directors, when her reelection was considered to be a safe bet.

== Reputation for independence ==
Paparian has been known throughout his political career for a "go-it-alone" streak. In 1997, the Los Angeles Times published a profile of Paparian, focusing on his independence and penchant for attracting controversy. The Times noted

To detractors, his antics have undercut some otherwise good works and tarred Pasadena's stately image. The controversies also have underlined the sometimes puzzling complexities of a former Republican (now an independent) who admires both leftist revolutionary Che Guevara and the U.S. Marine Corps, who speaks out on Cuba and for the rights of American gun owners like himself. Paparian's views may seem an incongruous marriage of right and left, but his friends say they mark an independent-minded populist who favors the underdog and answers no clarion but his own.

Paparian suggested that his advocacy for unpopular causes was the product of "an intolerance for intolerance" and his upbringing in a family of Armenian immigrants.

== Cuban relations ==
Paparian known for his efforts to normalize relations between the United States and Cuba. As Mayor of Pasadena, he convened a conference on U.S.-Cuba relations at Occidental College that was co-sponsored by the United Nations Association and the Department of Diplomacy and World Affairs. Paparian has traveled frequently to Cuba to coordinate the delivery of medical supplies and equipment and has worked with the Cuban Council of Churches and Havana's pediatric hospitals.

In July 1996, Paparian visited Cuba with his family in a trip paid for by the Cuban government. Paparian "received accolades and applause" in Cuba for his urging the U.S. government to end the trade embargo against Cuba. However, his visit led to criticism back in Pasadena. Upon his return from Cuba, more than 300 people crowded into a City Council meeting, some supporting and others opposing Paparian's trip.

== Criticism of China ==
Paparian has also been an outspoken critic of the People's Republic of China. In July 1996, Mayor Paparian welcomed the Dalai Lama to City Hall and presented him with a key to the city, ignoring concerns expressed by the State Department and the government of the People's Republic of China, that there could be dire consequences for the relationship between the United States and China. In December 2007, when Pasadena Mayor Bill Bogaard referred to China's human rights abuses in China "allegations," and invited China to enter a float in Pasadena's annual Rose Parade, Paparian wrote an article in the Pasadena Weekly urging parade observers to "Turn your backs on Bogaard's Beijing Float of Shame!"

== Armenian activism ==
As an Armenian-American, Paparian has also spoken out about the Armenian genocide. In April 1996, he was the keynote speaker at a ceremony attended by Elizabeth Dole and 7,000 others, remembering the genocide; the ceremony was held at the Armenian Martyrs Monument in Montebello, California. In his keynote address, Paparian noted: "Every year, we come to this hallowed site to honor the memory of our 1.5 million martyrs. Armenians the world over do the same on this day, each and every Armenian honoring our collective loss. But, we also know that the Genocide is not over. It continues silently, relentlessly, insidiously. The scars are not healed. The wounds are still festering, and the suffering is real." In 1989, Paparian led the effort to declare Vanadzor, Pasadena's fourth Sister City. When a Genocide Resolution was defeated in the U.S. Congress in 2007, Paparian called on House Speaker Nancy Pelosi under the Freedom of Information Act to release all records regarding the Genocide Resolution including records of meetings with representatives of the Turkish government. Paparian noted, "For too long, the leadership of the Democratic Party has played the Armenian-American community on recognition of the Armenian Genocide of 1915."

== Other issues ==
In what the Los Angeles Times called "one of his best-known moments," Paparian led Pasadena's opposition to the state's use of helicopters to spray pesticides to eradicate the Mediterranean fruit fly. Paparian received national media attention when he passed an ordiance outlawing formation-flying at low altitudes, and dispatched a Pasadena police helicopter to issue a citation to the state's pesticide-spraying aircraft.

In 1996, Paparian, then serving as Pasadena's Mayor, drew fire over a fund-raising "smoker" he hosted on the Rose Bowl's turf. Participants paid $110 each to smoke cigars with the Mayor, drawing criticism from anti-smoking advocates.

In 1997, Paparian became engaged in a legal battle with the Pasadena Star News. The paper published a front-page story on Paparian's personal financial troubles on the day of the 1996 UCLA-USC football game. Paparian sued the paper, charging that the reporter had used confidential credit records in an effort to embarrass him. The lawsuit was dismissed in February 1997.

Paparian has also been an outspoken opponent of the Iraq War and, in 2006, called on the California legislature to support and pass AJR 39, a California resolution calling for impeachment proceedings against George W. Bush and Dick Cheney.

== Electoral history ==
California's 29th congressional district election, 2006
| Party | Candidate | Votes | % |
|---|---|---|---|
| Democratic | Adam Schiff (incumbent) | 91,014 | 63.47 |
| Republican | William Bodell | 39,321 | 27.42 |
| Green | William Paparian | 8,197 | 5.72 |
| Peace and Freedom | Lynda Llamas | 2,599 | 1.81 |
| Libertarian | Jim Keller | 2,258 | 1.57 |
| Independent | John Burton (write-in) | 15 | 0.01 |
| Total votes | | 143,404 | 100.00 |
| Turnout | | | |
| Democratic hold | | | |

== See also ==
- History of the Armenian Americans in Los Angeles
- August 2006 speech by Paparian on the Israel Lobby on YouTube
- October 2006 speech by Paparian on Iraq War and George Bush on YouTube

Political offices
| Preceded by Katie Nack | Mayor of Pasadena; 1995-1997 | Succeeded by Chris Holden |
| Preceded by Josephine Heckman | Member of the Pasadena City Council for the 4th District; 1987-1999 | Succeeded by Steve Haderlein |
