= Clarence A. Winder =

American politician (1887–1959)

Clarence August Winder

30th Mayor of Pasadena
- In office 1953–1955
- Preceded by: Alson E. Abernethy
- Succeeded by: Warren Dorn

Personal details
- Born: March 30, 1887 Cincinnati, Ohio
- Died: July 22, 1959 (aged 72) Pasadena, California
- Party: Republican
- Spouse: Margaret
- Children: 3
- Education: University of Cincinnati
- Profession: Electrical engineer

Clarence A. Winder (March 30, 1887 – July 22, 1959) was an American politician who served as the 30th mayor of Pasadena, California, from 1953 to 1955 as a member of the Republican Party.

== Early life ==
Winder was born in Cincinnati, Ohio on March 30, 1887. After attending local schools, Winder graduated from the University of Cincinnati in 1909 with a degree in electrical engineering. At the University of Cincinnati, Winder took some law courses and earned a master's degree, also in electrical engineering. Immediately following graduation, Winder began working for General Electric in the company's electrical heating division.

== Career ==
In 1925, Winder began a long association with municipal government, when he became a superintendent of public utilities in Ft. Worth, Texas. Four years later, he relocated to California, where he became an engineering consultant. In 1933, he was appointed to a post at the Rural Electrification Administration, where he was responsible for laying down over 200,000 miles of lines.

In 1953, Winder served as mayor of Pasadena, California until 1955.

In 1954, he was appointed to a post with the Metropolitan Transit Authority, which was responsible for the development of public transit for the Greater Los Angeles Area.

In the early morning of Wednesday, July 22, 1959, Winder died of cancer at a Pasadena-area hospital.
