= Bill Sweek =

American basketball player and coach (born 1947)

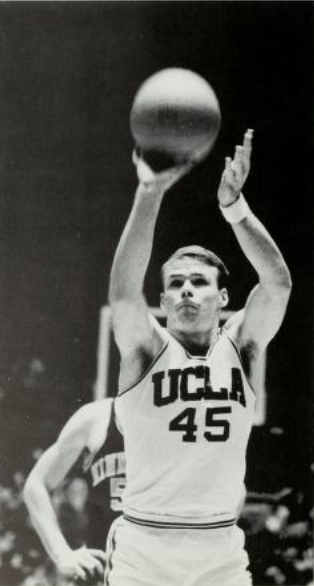
- Sweek with the Bruins during 1968–69 season

Personal information
- Born: January 9, 1947 (age 79) Los Angeles County, California, U.S.
- Listed height: 6 ft 3 in (1.91 m)

Career information
- High school: Pasadena (Pasadena, California)
- College: UCLA (1966–1969)
- NBA draft: 1969: 7th round, 86th overall pick
- Drafted by: Phoenix Suns
- Playing career: 1969–1975
- Position: Guard
- Coaching career: 1971–1991

Career history

Playing
- 1969–1970: Hamden Bics
- 1971–1972: CSC
- 1972–1975: Stade Français

Coaching
- 1971–1972: EO Goulette Kram
- 1971–1972: Tunisia
- 1972–1975: Stade Français
- 1976–1977: Clermont UC
- 1977–1979: Le Mans
- 1983–1984: Hungary
- 1985–1990: AS Monaco
- 1990–1991: Limoges CSP

Career highlights
- 3× NCAA champion (1967–1969)
- Stats at Basketball Reference

William Thomas Sweek (born January 9, 1947) is an American former basketball player and coach. He played college basketball for the UCLA Bruins under Coach John Wooden, winning three straight national championships from 1967 through 1969. The guard played professionally in France, and also became a coach in Europe and Africa. Sweek coached Clermont UC and Le Mans Sarthe Basket to national championships in France, and also led the Tunisia national basketball team. He was later a sports agent, and in time also worked as a high school coach and teacher.

== Early life ==
Sweek played basketball at Pasadena High School in Pasadena, California. In his senior year in 1964, he was the school's co-Player of the Year with teammate Jim Marsh, and was also named to the San Gabriel Valley All-Star Team by the Pasadena Independent and Star News.

== College career ==
Sweek was a rugged guard who was a key reserve at UCLA. Bruins coach John Wooden called him "one of the best players we've ever had at going into a game and stirring things up." Led by the dominant play of Lew Alcindor (known later as Kareem Abdul-Jabbar), the Bruins went 88–2 in Sweek's three seasons on the varsity squad. Sweek is one of 14 players who won three National Collegiate Athletic Association (NCAA) titles at UCLA under Wooden.

Sweek played on the UCLA freshman team in 1964–65, and redshirted the following season. In 1966–67, he was joined on the varsity team by incoming sophomores Alcindor, Lucius Allen, Lynn Shackelford and Kenny Heitz, who were recruited in 1965. Sweek was the sixth man for the Bruins, who went 30–0 and won the national title. Wooden typically utilized him late in games whenever the opponents were rallying. Against USC in February 1967, Sweek helped stave off an upset in overtime after scoring two baskets, making two steals, and forcing another turnover in a 40–35 victory over their intercity rivals. For the season, he and Shackelford shared honors as the team's most improved player. By the start of his junior year in 1967–68, Sweek was supplanted by Mike Lynn as UCLA's top reserve. In the season opener, Sweek hit a game-winning, outside shot with two seconds remaining in a 73–71 win against Purdue. However, he generally received little playing time that season.

As a senior in 1968–69, Sweek was again voted the Bruins' most improved player. The team had lost starting guards Allen and Mike Warren from the year before, but they were effectively replaced by Sweek, Heitz, and junior college transfer John Vallely, who each played about equally. In the semifinals of the 1969 NCAA tournament against Drake, the Bruins started poorly. Towards the middle of the first half, Sweek missed a defensive assignment, prompting Wooden to pull him from the game. Already unhappy with his playing time having shrunk in the prior weeks, Sweek remained on the bench for most of the game. When Vallely fouled out with four minutes left in the game, Sweek was directed by Wooden to re-enter the game. However, he was casual in checking in, prompting the coach to ask him to sit if he did not want to play. Instead, Sweek walked off the court and headed to the locker room. After the game, won 85–82 by UCLA, Wooden was furious with Sweek, who felt certain he would be kicked off the team. However, the coach eventually forgave him, and played him in the title game two nights later against Purdue. Sweek shot a perfect three of three in the game, which the Bruins won by 20 points for their record-setting third consecutive NCAA title. As years passed, Sweek's appreciation for Wooden's gesture grew. "Somehow, he was gracious enough to forgive me when I was totally wrong," said Sweek.

== Professional career ==
The Phoenix Suns of the National Basketball Association (NBA) selected the 6-foot-2 1/2-inch (1.89 m) Sweek in the seventh round of the 1969 NBA draft with the 86th overall pick. He played professionally for Stade Français in Paris. Sweek served in the Peace Corps, and also became a coach in Europe and Africa. One of the top coaches in France, he led Le Mans Sarthe Basket to consecutive national titles in 1978 and 1979 after having guided Clermont UC to a women's national championship in 1977. He also coached the Tunisia national basketball team.

Sweek was later a sales representative with Adidas, and became the vice president of team sports with Virginia-based sports marketing firm ProServ, where he was also a sports agent. He represented European NBA players, as well as Americans interested in playing in Europe. Some of his clients included the 7-foot-7-inch (2.31 m) Gheorghe Mureșan, the tallest player in NBA history, Martin Müürsepp, John Amaechi, Terry Davis, and Damon Bailey. Sweek was also a French interpreter for the Romanian Mureșan. While still at ProServ in 1996, he began coaching basketball at George Mason High School in Falls Church, Virginia. By 2010, he had become a teacher in Sonoma, California, where he taught history, science and physical education.

Sweek played in a minor role in the 1971 movie Drive, He Said, which was directed by Jack Nicholson. Michael Warren, Sweek's former UCLA teammate who became an actor, was also in the film.
