= David Negri =

American politician

Member of the California State Assembly from the 41st district
- In office January 2, 1967 – January 6, 1969
- Preceded by: Tom C. Carrell
- Succeeded by: Henry Arklin

Personal details
- Born: January 29, 1927 Burbank, California, U.S.
- Died: August 9, 2011 (aged 84) Los Angeles, California, U.S.
- Party: Democratic
- Children: 6
- Education: University of California, Los Angeles; Stanford University; Stanford Law School

David Negri (January 29, 1927 – August 9, 2011) was an American politician. He served as a Democratic member for the 41st district of the California State Assembly.

== Life and career ==
Negri was born in Burbank, California. He attended the University of California, Los Angeles, Stanford University and Stanford Law School.

Negri was an attorney.

In 1966, Negri was elected to represent the 41st district of the California State Assembly, succeeding Tom C. Carrell. He served until 1969, when he was succeeded by Henry Arklin.

Negri died on August 9, 2011 in Los Angeles, California, at the age of 84.
