= Bill Bogaard =

American politician

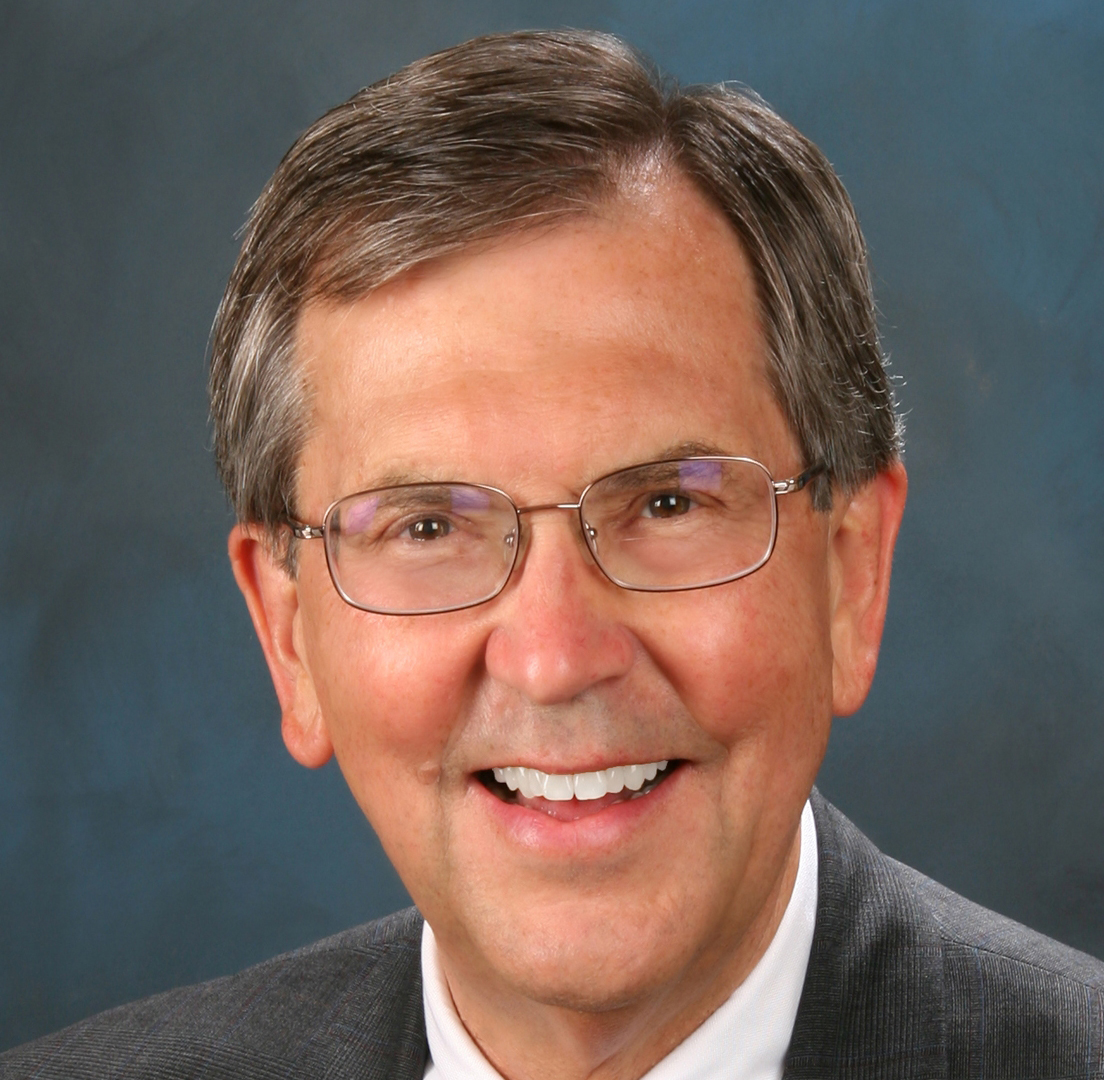

46th and 54th Mayor of Pasadena
- In office May 1999 – May 2015
- Preceded by: Chris Holden
- Succeeded by: Terry Tornek
- In office May 1984 – May 1986
- Preceded by: Loretta Thompson-Glickman
- Succeeded by: John C. Crowley

Personal details
- Born: January 18, 1938 (age 88) Sioux City, Iowa, U.S.
- Party: Democratic
- Spouse: Claire M. Whalen (m. 1961)
- Education: Loyola Marymount University; University of Michigan Law School
- Profession: Attorney

Military service
- Rank: Captain

William Joseph Bogaard (born 1938) is an American politician and the former mayor of Pasadena, California.

== Early life and career ==
On January 18, 1938, Bogaard was born in Sioux City, Iowa. He graduated from Loyola Marymount University and was a captain in the U.S. Air Force. He obtained his Juris Doctor degree from the University of Michigan and became a lawyer. Prior to being elected mayor, Bogaard taught at the University of Michigan and the University of Southern California.

== Mayoralty and after ==
Bogaard is a member of the Democratic Party. He was first elected mayor in 1999, and was reelected with an overwhelming majority of the vote (over 85%) in 2003. Bogaard was the first elected mayor of Pasadena since the 1940s and the longest-serving mayor in Pasadena's history. As Mayor of Pasadena, Bogaard appeared frequently in Pasadena's Rose Parade.

In 2007, Bogaard sought reelection for a third term as mayor. His opponent was Aaron Proctor. The election was held on March 6, and Bogaard won easily, getting 11,558 votes (88.7% of the vote).

In 2011, Bogaard ran unopposed, receiving 12,202 votes.

He has served on the board of directors of the League of California Cities since 2007, and was elected as president of the board on September 7, 2012.

== 2015 State of the City Address ==
In his 2015 State of the City Address, Mayor Bill Bogaard reflected on his 16 years in office and the impact of his service as Pasadena’s first directly elected mayor. He noted the importance of cooperation from the city’s officials and residents in building the city. Bogaard also used the speech to express his commitment to public service and to the city during his final year as mayor.

Bogaard talked about the discovery of an embezzlement incident involving the city’s utilities and its undergrounding fund. The city had conducted internal reviews of the city departments that discovered the issues, which led to the Los Angeles County District Attorney's office investigating the Pasadena City Council and its departments, leading to felony charges being filed against several individuals involved in the Pasadena City Council. Additionally, KPMG audits revealed that the Pasadena City Council lost up to $6.4 million over the course of 10 to 11 years in relation to the utility fund issues.

In addition to discussing the situation and the investigation that followed it, Bogaard shared plans to address the uncovered issues. Several employees of the Pasadena City Council who were involved in the embezzlement were placed on administrative leave. An independent investigator was hired to investigate the city offices and the internal controls that the city had in place as a means of preventing the embezzlement from occurring again. Additionally, both the City Council and a task force made of city residents were to be formed to improve the city government and controls within the Pasadena City Council to prevent any future instances of the City Council members engaging in such misdeeds.

== Legacy and Impact ==
During his term as mayor of Pasadena, Bill Boggard was able to significantly increase the city’s economy and its infrastructure. Bogaard stated in his 2015 State of the City address that the city’s assessed property valuation had reached over $24 billion, and that the city’s unemployment rate had declined to near 6 percent. Bogaard also discussed Pasadena’s adoption of budgets that balanced the city’s public revenues and expenditures, as well as reforms to the city’s pension system.

Furthermore, Bogaard undertook a variety of infrastructure projects during his term. Bogaard mentioned in his 2015 State of the City address his city’s improvement to parks, streets, sidewalks, and the Glenarm Power Plant. Bogaard also committed the city to the Foothill Gold Line extension, as well as to the continued renovation of the Rose Bowl Stadium.

Finally, Bogaard committed to forming partnerships with other organizations within Pasadena and San Gabriel Valley, as well as starting development and economic projects to promote the growth of Pasadena as a city. Bogaard mentioned initiatives like Innovate Pasadena and Collaborate Pasadena, which aimed to promote business growth and education within Pasadena. Furthermore, Bogaard also stated in his 2015 State of the City address his opinions of Pasadena as a city that was formed through the collaborations among its citizens, who were committed to long-term planning for the city.

== Personal life ==
Bogaard married Claire M. Whalen on January 28, 1961, in San Francisco, California. In 1971, they moved to Pasadena, California. They have four children.

== Electoral history ==
=== 1999 ===
Pasadena General Election, 1999
Party	Candidate	Votes	%
Democratic	Bill Bogaard	11,576	60
Democratic	Chris Holden (incumbent)	7,760	40
Total votes		19,336	100.0
Turnout			

=== 2003 ===
Pasadena General Election, 2003
Party	Candidate	Votes	%
Democratic	Bill Bogaard (incumbent)	9,800	85
Green	Philip Koebel	1,785	15
Total votes		11,585	100.0
Turnout			

=== 2007 ===
Pasadena General Election, 2007
Party	Candidate	Votes	%
Democratic	Bill Bogaard (incumbent)	11,558	89
Republican	Aaron Proctor*	1,472	11
Total votes		13,057	100.0
Turnout			

- Proctor ran as "decline to state" as he did not join the Republican Party until late 2007.

=== 2011 ===
Pasadena Consolidated Primary Nominating Election, 2011
Party	Candidate	Votes	%
Democratic	Bill Bogaard (incumbent)	12,202	100
Total votes		12,202	100.0
Turnout			19.7

== Additional sources ==
- André Coleman and Joe Piasecki (January 11, 2007). "The Bogaard Report". Pasadena Weekly.
- Claire Noland (June 9, 2007). "Former Pasadena Mayor Mortimer Matthews, 76, Dies". Los Angeles Times.

Political offices
Preceded by Loretta Thompson-Glickman	Mayor of Pasadena; 1984-1986	Succeeded by John C. Crowley
Preceded by Charles McKenney	Member of the Pasadena Board of City Directors for the 6th District; 1979-1987	Succeeded by Katie Nack
Preceded by Chris Holden	Mayor of Pasadena; 1999–2015	Succeeded by Terry Tornek
