= Ernani Bernardi =

American politician (1911–2006)

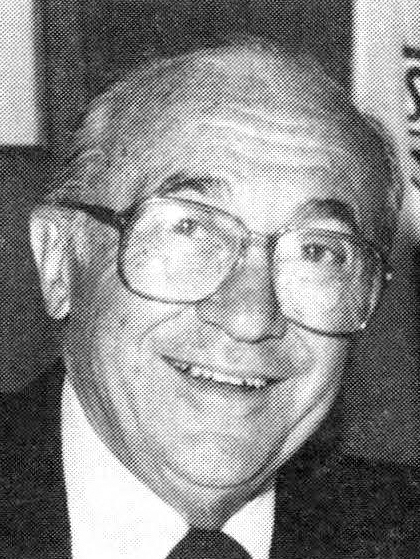
- Official portrait, 1986

Member of the Los Angeles City Council for the 7th district
- In office June 1, 1961 – July 1, 1993
- Preceded by: James C. Corman
- Succeeded by: Richard Alarcon

Assistant President Pro Tempore of the Los Angeles City Council
- In office July 1, 1977 – June 30, 1989
- Preceded by: Office established
- Succeeded by: Joan Milke Flores

Personal details
- Born: October 29, 1911 Standard, Illinois, U.S.
- Died: January 4, 2006 (aged 94) Los Angeles, California, U.S.
- Party: Democratic; Independent (1993)
- Spouses: Lucille May Sawasky (m. 1933; died 1993) Eve Troutman (m. 2001)
- Children: 4
- Education: University of Detroit
- Occupation: Politician, saxophonist, musical arranger

Ernani Bernardi (October 29, 1911 – January 4, 2006) was a politician and big band musician. He served on the Los Angeles City Council from 1961 to 1993, representing the 7th district and becoming the second longest-serving council member in the history of the city. Prior to entering politics, Bernardi was the musical arranger for two of the mid-20th century's most popular dance melodies.

== Early and personal life ==
Bernardi was born on October 29, 1911 above a grocery store his family owned in Standard, Illinois, the son of musician Alfonso Bernardi and Nerina Biagini.

His parents were immigrants who came to America by way of Ellis Island, from a small town in the province of Modena in Emilia Romagna. His mother died in childbirth, and he was raised by his father, two grandmothers, an aunt and an uncle. When he was eleven, he was moved to the nearby town of Toluca, Illinois, where he later played varsity basketball.

Bernardi attended the University of Detroit, where he planned to study journalism and become a sportscaster. He was playing saxophone in a dance band at Detroit's Graystone Ballroom when he met Lucille May Sawasky of Port Arthur, Ontario.

They were married in 1933 and lived in Detroit briefly before moving to New York. The couple had four children, Joanne Marie Roots, Judith Ann, John Paul and (Ernani) James. They settled in Los Angeles in 1939 or 1940, and Bernardi began his second career as a contractor, building custom homes. After their children were grown, Lucille Bernardi went to work in the county probation department as a records clerk. When older, she suffered from Alzheimer's disease, and Bernardi, by then a City Council member, would bring her to work with him from their home in Van Nuys to watch television in his office. She died in 1993. Ernani Bernardi remarried in November 2001 to Eve Troutman.

Bernardi was described at age 74 in 1985 as "crusty, . . . short, bald and bespectacled," and four years later he was said to have "a puckish sense of humor."

As he aged, his hearing deteriorated, and he wore special headphones at council meetings so he could hear what was going on. Even at age 86, he had "a booming voice and aggressive style."

He died of heart failure at the age of 94 on January 4, 2006.

== Musical career ==
Bernardi's father, Alfonso, was a music teacher who taught his son how to play the saxophone. Ernani went on to become a musician, performing under the pseudonym Noni Bernardi as lead alto sax for several of big bands of the era such as those of Benny Goodman, Tommy Dorsey and Kay Kyser. He was known for his arrangements of Goodman's "And the Angels Sing" and Dorsey's "I'm Getting Sentimental Over You."

Bernardi moved to California in 1940 to perform with Kay Kyser's Kollege of Musical Knowledge. His musical prowess was acknowledged in 1994, when at age 82 he was awarded a star on the Hollywood Walk of Fame. The Los Angeles Times noted that his star was funded by the city's Community Redevelopment Agency, an organization that Bernardi had been opposed to. The star is on the 7000 block of Hollywood Boulevard.

The ex-councilman continued playing the sax well into his eighties. In 2000 he was a regular at age 88 with his band booked, among other places, at a retro big band restaurant called Leon's Steak House in North Hollywood. The Times reported:

When this guy takes his spot in front of a 16-piece ensemble of blaring trumpets and gleaming saxes—The Way It Was Orchestra, as he calls it—his frail arms start pumping, his toes tap and his body begins to radiate a vigor that energizes the old musicians like swigs from a fountain of youth. . . . nothing stirs the diminutive Bernardi—he's about 5 foot 3, a little over 100 pounds—like his music.

== Los Angeles City Council (1961–1993) ==
=== Elections ===
By 1957 a contractor in the San Fernando Valley, Bernardi ran for the Los Angeles City Council District 7 seat that year but finished third in the primary election, after James C. Corman, the eventual victor, and Kay Bogendorfer. When Corman was elected to Congress, Bernardi ran again in 1961 and was elected. He served eight terms until retiring in 1993.

In 1961, District 7 covered Van Nuys, Sepulveda, Granada Hills and Sylmar, and in 1986 it covered Panorama City, part of Sun Valley and Sylmar. For most of his early terms in office, Bernardi represented a "predominantly white working-class district in the mid-San Fernando Valley." His backers included many Valley tax opponents who were behind the successful passage of California's Proposition 13 anti-tax measure.

In 1986, a 12-vote majority of the City Council moved Bernardi's 7th District to a "largely new" part of the Valley for him, the northeast area, which contained more minorities than his former territory. One "City Hall lobbyist" opined that the measure in some way was a payback for Bernardi's public criticism of his colleagues. Yet he was reelected in 1989 by 55% to 45% over Fire Captain Lyle Hall, "who had more money, a more sophisticated mail campaign and labor unions' support that translated into scores of ready volunteers." Bernardi also picked up support from Latino leaders in his new district.

By the time Bernardi retired in 1993, the 7th District was 70 percent Latino and 19 percent African-American, encompassing one of Los Angeles's poorest areas. Registered voters were 39 percent Anglo, 30 percent Latino and 19 percent African-American.

His tenure of 32 years has been surpassed only by the 35 years of Council Member John Ferraro.

=== Tenure ===
Bernardi was nicknamed "Mr. No" because of his opposition to city spending, and he was known as the City Council's "gadfly" because of his "pesky pursuit of lost causes," but in 1985 he was successful in forcing the City Council to put a tough campaign-reform law on the April ballot after he circulated petitions that would have required a vote on an even tougher law. He did this by "enlisting the support of the League of Women Voters and a ragtag group made up mostly of retirees to qualify an initiative for the ballot."

Bernardi listed his campaign-reform success as among his most satisfying achievements, as well as an ordinance requiring all residential developments of five or more units to set aside at least 15 percent of the units for low and moderate-income families. He also supported rent control.

He led successful campaigns for city charter amendments that limited police and firefighter pensions and that did away with a requirement that the city pay comparable wages to those of private industry. "I think he reflects a philosophy of misery" because of his efforts to cut allocations for human services, fellow Councilman David S. Cunningham, Jr. said. The Los Angeles Times added:

Yet, there is a compassionate side to Bernardi. After visiting Tent City, a shelter for the homeless set up across from City Hall during the 1984 Christmas season, Bernardi returned to his office and began calling food stores and restaurants to solicit food donations. When a grocery store donated a box of uncooked beans, Bernardi opened up the City Hall kitchen and cooked the beans himself.

He was seen as a "loner" on the 15-member City Council, lacking the spirit of compromise, thus limiting his political effect, yet longtime council president John S. Gibson, Jr. praised him for probably saving the city "millions of dollars over the years with his questioning." In a ceremony marking his 25th anniversary on the council, he was presented with the "no" voting button from his desk, "which Councilman John Ferraro said was 'worn out' from overuse."

In 1987 he voted against supporting a Los Angeles Festival of Arts with money and services because it was "chintzy" for a $5.8 million festival to ask for help. He was joined by Council Members Gloria Molina and Nate Holden, who said not enough minority artists were represented.

In 1988 Bernardi provided $70,000 from his $641,978-a-year office budget for police task forces to combat burglaries and drug trafficking in his district, and, even though he supported a lobbying group called FAIR, "devoted to using the harshest possible measures to reduce illegal immigration," he helped establish a hiring hall to get immigrant workers off the street.

Critics claimed that "as an aging white man," he lacked "modern-day sensitivity" when, in August 1991, he called African-American Councilman Mark Ridley-Thomas "Curly" during an "emotionally charged discussion of racism." Ridley-Thomas rebuked Bernardi for the "condescending and racist" remark, and Bernardi apologized. In his last years on the council, he continued casting "no" votes: against building the Metro Rail subway, against establishing a downtown redevelopment project, against declaring Martin Luther King Jr.'s birthday a city holiday. He said he didn't mind recognizing the civil rights leader, but did not want to give city workers another day off.

One of his final campaigns was against the practice of the City Council drawing its own district boundaries. He urged that instead the boundaries should be set by a special commission of retired Municipal Court judges. In a related comment, on his last day in office he issued a press release applauding the U.S. Supreme Court in its Shaw v. Reno decision invalidating the drawing of a serpentine-shaped Congressional district whose parts seemed to have nothing to do with each other than the fact they were inhabited mostly by black people.

== Later life ==
=== 1993 Los Angeles mayoral campaign ===
Bernardi ran for mayor of Los Angeles while he was in his last few months on the City Council in 1993, saying that the other candidates failed to address issues that were important to him—mostly slashing the size and cost of government. He ran a low-budget, no-frills campaign, and in the end received just 1 percent of the citywide vote.

=== Other activities ===
In 1994 Bernardi sued the city of Los Angeles and its redevelopment agency, alleging that the agency violated the state's open meetings law when it was considering plans for Downtown Los Angeles. He helped finance the costs of his lawsuit by selling a videocassette of several big bands performing his favorite tunes. Eventually, appellate courts and the state supreme court ruled in favor of Bernardi in the main thrust of his claim, which effectively set a cap on the amount of money the agency could spend on the project.

In the 1990s he spoke against the idea of establishing neighborhood councils as part of a proposed city charter reform process.

In 1999, City Council President John Ferraro appointed Bernardi to a committee to oversee the spending of $744 million in bond funds for police and fire stations.

| Preceded by James C. Corman | Los Angeles City Council; 7th District; 1961–93 | Succeeded by Richard Alarcón |
| Preceded by Office established | Assistant President Pro Tempore of the Los Angeles City Council; 1977–89 | Succeeded by Joan Milke Flores |
