= Loretta Thompson-Glickman =

American jazz musician

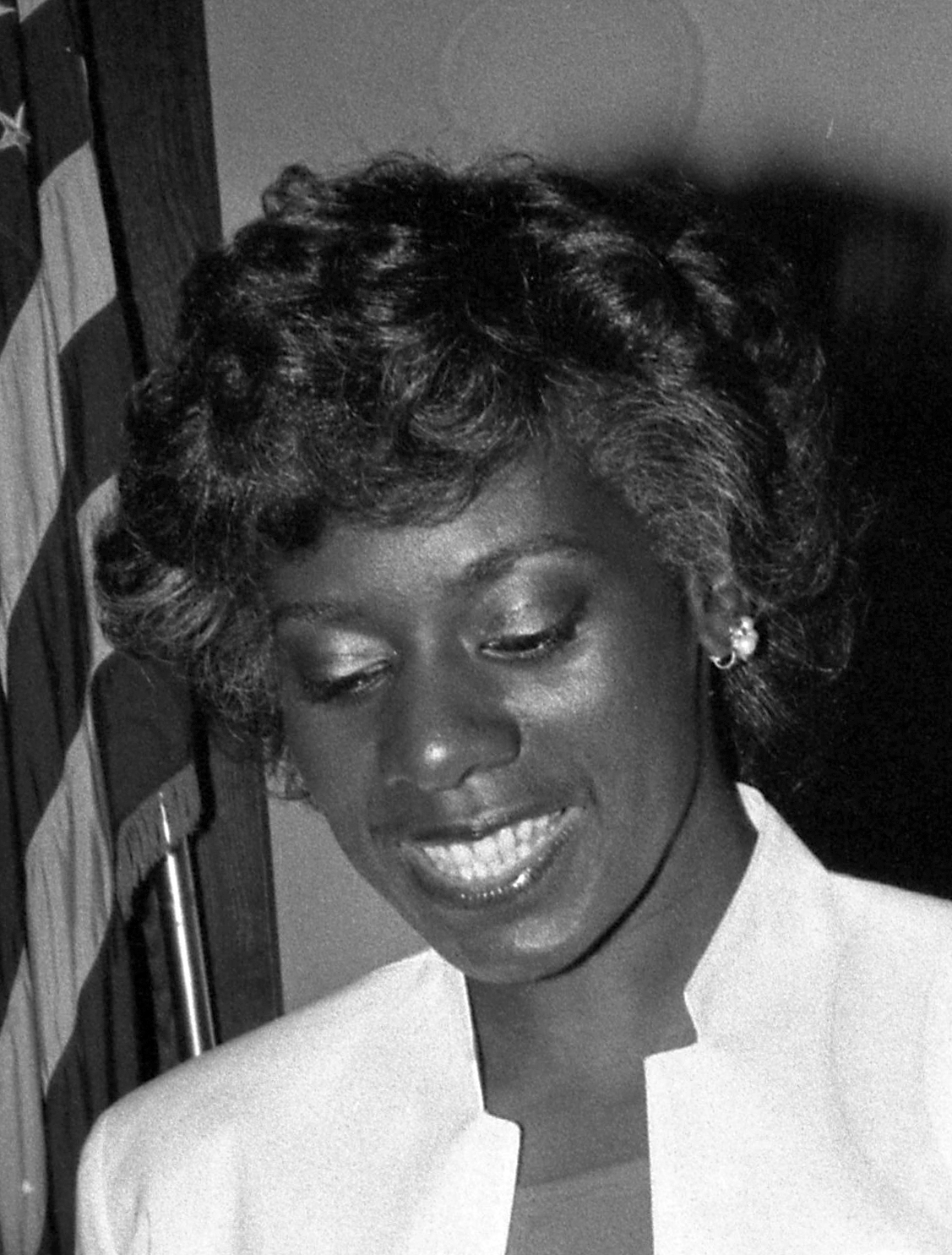

45th Mayor of Pasadena
- In office 1982–1984
- Preceded by: Josephine Heckman
- Succeeded by: Bill Bogaard

Personal details
- Born: May 23, 1945
- Died: March 18, 2001 (aged 55) Lubbock, Texas
- Party: Democratic
- Spouse(s): Saul Glickman (1972-1982, div.); William B. Hillson (1991-1994, div.); Elijah W. Austin (m. 1994)
- Occupation: Singer, politician

Loretta Jean Thompson-Glickman (May 23, 1945 – March 18, 2001) was an American politician. She became the first African-American mayor of Pasadena, California, in 1982, which also made her the first Black woman to be mayor of an American city of over 100,000 residents.

== Early life and education ==
Thompson-Glickman grew up in Pasadena, and attended courses at Pasadena City College from 1963 to 1968, but did not complete any degree program.

== Career ==
Thompson was a jazz singer and toured with the New Christy Minstrels and London Fog, before retiring from the entertainment industry in 1975 to start a family. She also taught high school English in Pasadena Public Schools from 1970 to 1972, but had to resign when her temporary teaching credential expired.

In 1977, Thompson-Glickman became the first black woman elected as a Pasadena city director, a few days before she gave birth to her younger son. Four years later, she became the city's first black vice mayor, before becoming mayor in 1982. "There was the possibility that a minority might not get to be mayor here for many years to come," she recalled of the moment. "And it was my turn." (The office of Mayor in Pasadena was not an elected or paid position, but chosen by the elected Board of City Directors, from among the Board's own members.) She was also the first Black woman to be mayor of an American city of over 100,000 residents.

Beyond politics, Thompson-Glickman was active in church work, as choir director at Pasadena's Grace United Methodist Church and First United Methodist Church of Pacoima, and later minister of music at New Jerusalem Baptist Church in Lubbock, Texas. She also worked as an investment and financial aid counselor. As president of the Pasadena Human Relations Committee, she was the first Black woman member of the Pasadena Tournament of Roses Association.

== Personal life and legacy ==
Thompson married educator and union leader Saul Z. Glickman in 1972; they had two sons, and divorced in 1982. She was married two more times: in 1991 to Rev. William Berry Hillson, and in 1994, to Elijah W. Austin, a Methodist clergyman. She died in 2001, at the age of 55, in Lubbock, Texas. The Loretta Glickman Endowment Fund for African-American Youth was established in her memory, by the Pasadena Community Foundation. Another scholarship fund in her memory was established at the Lubbock campus of Wayland Baptist University, where she worked in her last years. An oil portrait of Thompson-Glickman, painted in 1987 by Charles Haywood, is displayed in the Pasadena City Hall.

== See also ==
- List of first African-American mayors
- African American mayors in California
