= List of mayors of Pasadena, California =

Mayor of Pasadena
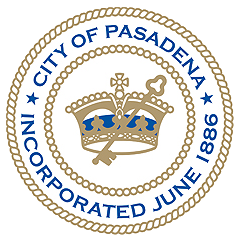
- Seal of Pasadena

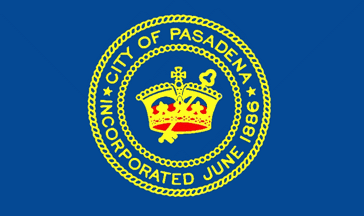
- Flag of Pasadena

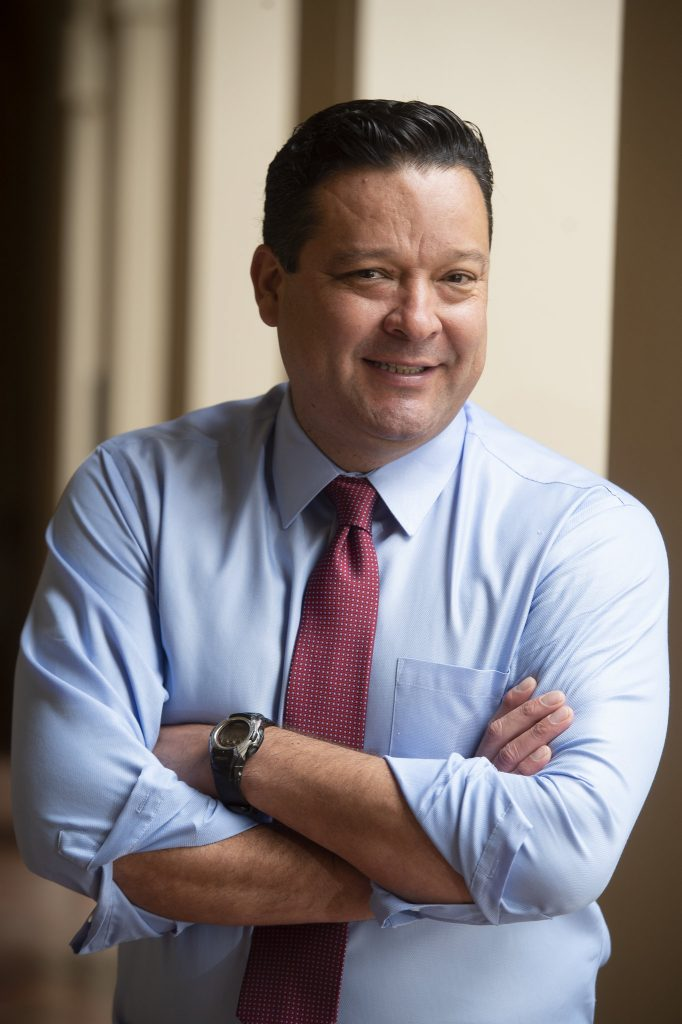
- Incumbent; Victor Gordo since December 15, 2020
- Term length: 4 years
- Formation: 1886
- First holder: Henry James Holmes

The Mayor of Pasadena is the head of the Pasadena city government.

== Mayors of Pasadena, California ==
#	Dates	Image	Name	Life dates	Elected by	Party	Notes
1	1886–1887		Henry James Holmes	1825–1892	council	Republican	
2	1887–1889		Millard Mayhew Parker	1849–1928	council	Republican	
3	1889–1890		Amos G. Throop	1811–1894	council	Temperance	
4	1890–1892		Theodore Lukens (1)	1848–1918	council	Republican	
5	1892–1894		Oscar Fitzallen Weed	1824–1919	council	Republican	
6	1894–1895		Theodore Lukens (2)	1848–1918	council	Republican	
7	1895–1896		John Samuel Cox	1857–1941	council	Republican	
8	1896–1898		Calvin Hartwell	1849–1920	council	Republican	
9	1898–1900		George Downing Patten	1847–1922	council	Republican	
10	1900–1901		Horace Dobbins	1868–1962	council	Republican	
11	1901–1903		Martin H. Weight	1854–1920	public	Republican	First publicly elected mayor
12	1903–1905		William Vedder	1862–1923	public	Democratic	
13	1905–1907		William Waterhouse	1852–1943	public	Republican	
14	1907–1911		Thomas Earley	1849–1912	public	Democratic	
15	1911–1913		William Thum	1862–1941	public	Socialist	
16	1913–1915		Richard Lee Metcalf	1854–1916	public	Democratic	
17	1915–1921		Arthur Lincoln Hamilton	1859–1953	public		
18	1921–1925		Hiram W. Wadsworth	1862–1939	public	Republican	
19	1925–1927		Franklin Brooks Cole	1872–1943	council		
20	1927–1929		Clayton Taylor	1870–1941	council	Republican	
21	1929–1931		Robert L. Daugherty	1885–1978	council	Republican	
22	1931–1932		Patrick M. Walker	1876–1946	council		
23	1932–1941		Edward O. Nay	1873–1941	council	Republican	Only mayor to die in office
24	1941–1943		Albert I. Stewart	1870–1963	council	Republican	
25	1943–1945		Carl G. Wopschall	1879–1959	council		
26	1945–1947		Robert E. Dawson	1884–1968	council	Republican	
27	1947–1948		Charles Hamill	1898–1978	council		
28	1948–1951		A. Ray Benedict	1885–1974	council	Republican	
29	1951–1953		Alson E. Abernethy	1900–1969	council	Republican	
30	1953–1955		Clarence A. Winder	1887–1959	council	Republican	
31	1955–1956		Warren Dorn	1918–2006	council	Republican	
32	1956–1959		Seth Miller	1890–1967	council	Republican	
33	1959–1961		Ray G. Woods	1910–1990	council	Republican	
34	1961–1963		C. Lewis Edwards	1905–1999	council	Democratic	
35	1963–1964		Clarence Allen Oakley	1915–1982	council	Democratic	
36	1964–1966		Floyd Gwinn	1897–1972	council	Democratic	
37	1966–1968		Boyd Welin	1904–1989	council	Republican	
38	1968–1970		Cyril Bernard Cooper	1900–1971	council	Republican	
39	1970–1972		Walter Benedict	1908–2000	council	Republican	
40	1972–1974		Donald F. Yokaitis	1932–	council	Republican	
41	1974–1976		Mortimer J. Matthews	1933–2007	council	Republican	
42	1976–1977		Robert Glenn White	1929–2010	council	Democrat	
43	1977–1980		Dr. Ellis Jones	1916–1986	council	Republican	
44	1980–1982		Josephine Heckman	1914–1998	council	Republican	First female mayor
45	1982–1984		Loretta Thompson-Glickman	1945–2001	council	Democratic	First African-American mayor
46	1984–1986		Bill Bogaard (1)	1938–	council	Democratic	
47	1986–1988		John C. Crowley	1920–2007	council	Democratic	
48	1988–1990		William E. Thomson	1927–	council	Republican	
49	1990–1992		Jess Hughston	1924–1998	council	Democratic	
50	1992–1994		Rick Cole	1953–	council	Democratic	
51	1994–1995		Katie Nack	1925–2008	council	Democratic	
52	1995–1997		Bill Paparian	1950–	council	Independent	
53	1997–1999		Chris Holden	1960–	council	Democratic	Second African-American mayor
54	1999–2015		Bill Bogaard (2)	1938–	public	Democratic	Longest-serving mayor
55	2015–2020		Terry Tornek	1945-	public	Democratic	
56	2020–		Victor Gordo	1969-	public	Democratic	Current mayor First Hispanic mayor
