= Terry Tornek =

American politician

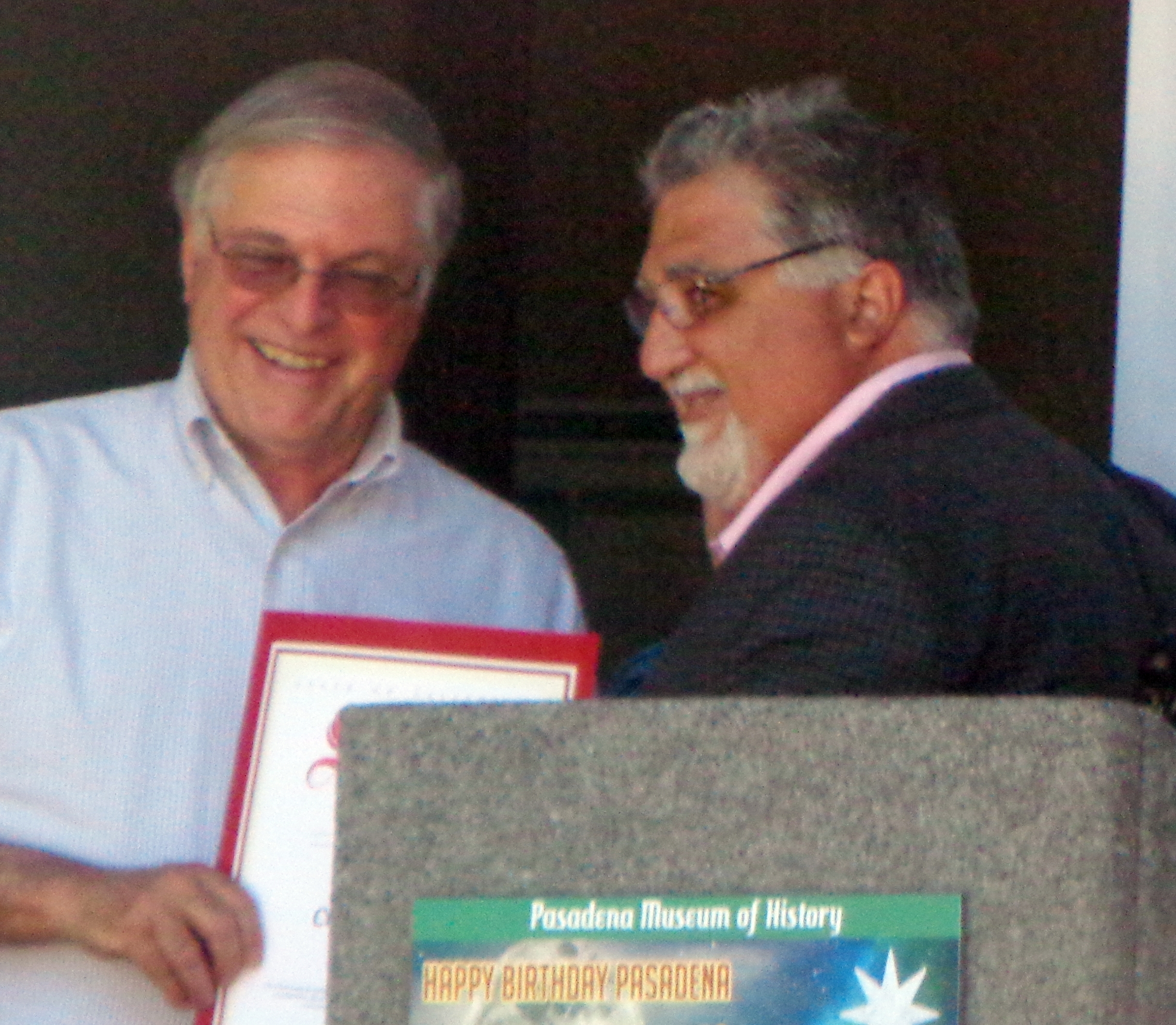
- Tornek (left) with Anthony Portantino, California State Senator, in 2018

55th Mayor of Pasadena
- In office May 4, 2015 – December 7, 2020
- Preceded by: Bill Bogaard
- Succeeded by: Victor Gordo

Personal details
- Born: November 23, 1945 (age 80) New York City, New York, U.S.
- Party: Democratic
- Spouse: Maria Elizabeth Mascoli
- Education: Princeton University; Columbia University
- Profession: Planning director

Terry Eliot Tornek (born November 23, 1945) is an American politician who was the mayor of Pasadena, California from 2015 to 2020. He previously served on the Pasadena City Council. On April 21, 2015, he defeated City Councilmember Jacque Robinson in the general election to replace Bill Bogaard, the longest-serving mayor in Pasadena's history. Tornek was the second longest-serving mayor in Pasadena's history.

Tornek was born to Allen Vernon Tornek and Gertrude Slotkin Tornek in New York City. He was an urban renewal representative with the United States Department of Housing and Urban Development in New York City from 1968 to 1969.

== Electoral history ==
=== 2015 ===
Pasadena general election, 2015
Party	Candidate	Votes	%
Democratic	Terry Tornek	8,549	54.4
Democratic	Jacque Robinson	7,170	45.6
Total votes		15,719	100.0
Turnout			

=== 2020 ===
Pasadena general election, 2020
Party	Candidate	Votes	%
Democratic	Victor Gordo	37,187	54.82
Democratic	Terry Tornek	30,650	45.18
Total votes		67,837	100.0
Turnout			

== Early life ==
On November 23, 1945, Tornek was born in New York City, New York.

== Education ==
Tornek graduated from Princeton University with a degree in international affairs and from Columbia University with a degree in urban planning.

== Career ==
In the late 1970s, Tornek's political career started on the city council of Springfield, Massachusetts.

Tornek served in the City of Pasadena planning department from 1982 to 1985, where he was involved in the revitalization of Old Pasadena, which included remodeling historic buildings and transforming it into a tourist destination with eateries and shops. It is now a National Landmark. He also worked in the private sector as a developer and planning director. Tornek was elected to the City Council from the 7th District in 2009 and reelected in 2013.

Tornek served on the Burbank-Glendale-Pasadena Airport Authority, the group that operates Hollywood Burbank Airport, representing Pasadena, as well as on the San Gabriel Valley Council of Governments. He gave his seat to Pasadena council member John Kennedy in 2019.

== Personal life ==
In 1967, Tornek married Maria. They have three children. In the 1970s, they lived in Massachusetts. In 1982, the Torneks moved to Pasadena. Tornek has seven grandchildren.

Political offices
Preceded by Bill Bogaard	Mayor of Pasadena; 2015–present	Incumbent
