= California's 41st State Assembly district =

American legislative district

Current assemblymember
John Harabedian; D–Sierra Madre
- Population (2010) • Voting age • Citizen voting age: 462,507; 363,586; 324,531
- Demographics: 46.11% White; 8.49% Black; 30.73% Latino; 13.00% Asian; 0.50% Native American; 0.18% Hawaiian/Pacific Islander; 0.33% other; 0.66% remainder of multiracial
- Registered voters: 290,052
- Registration: 44.43% Democratic; 28.50% Republican; 22.27% No party preference

California's 41st State Assembly district is one of the 80 State Assembly districts in the U.S. state of California. It is currently being represented by Democrat John Harabedian of Sierra Madre.

== District profile ==
The district encompasses most of the San Gabriel Mountains and various foothill communities. The district is anchored by Pasadena, its largest and westernmost city.

Los Angeles County – 3.7%

- Altadena
- Claremont
- East Pasadena
- La Cañada Flintridge
- La Verne
- Monrovia – 99.3%
- Pasadena
- San Dimas
- Sierra Madre

San Bernardino County – 4.8%

- Rancho Cucamonga – 12.3%
- San Antonio Heights
- Upland

== Election results from statewide races ==
Year	Office	Results
2020	President	Biden 65.6 – 32.2%
2018	Governor	Newsom 62.8 – 37.2%
2018	Senator	Feinstein 59.2 – 40.8%
2016	President	Clinton 62.8 – 31.3%
2016	Senator	Harris 63.6 – 36.4%
2014	Governor	Brown 59.5 – 40.5%
2012	President	Obama 59.7 – 37.7%
2012	Senator	Feinstein 61.8 – 38.2%

== List of assembly members representing the district ==
Due to redistricting, the 41st district has been moved around different parts of the state. The current iteration resulted from the 2021 redistricting by the California Citizens Redistricting Commission.

Assembly members	Party	Years served	Counties represented	Notes
Henry C. Firebaugh	Republican	January 5, 1885 – January 3, 1887	San Francisco	
Henry R. Mann	Democratic	January 3, 1887 – January 7, 1889	San Francisco	
Henry C. Dibble	Republican	January 7, 1889 – January 2, 1893	San Francisco	
John M. Curtis	Democratic	January 2, 1893 – January 7, 1895	San Francisco	
Frank Hubbard Powers	Republican	January 7, 1895 – January 4, 1897	San Francisco	
Henry C. Dibble	Republican	January 4, 1897 – January 1, 1901	San Francisco	
Oscar Sutro	Democratic	January 1, 1901 – January 5, 1903	San Francisco	
Frederick Lux	Republican	January 5, 1903 – January 2, 1905	San Francisco	
Nathan C. Coghlan	Republican	January 2, 1905 – January 6, 1913	San Francisco	
C. C. Young	Republican	January 6, 1913 – January 6, 1919	Alameda	
C. C. Young	Progressive	January 6, 1913 – January 6, 1919	Alameda	
C. C. Young	Republican	January 6, 1913 – January 6, 1919	Alameda	
Anna L. Saylor	Republican	January 6, 1919 – January 3, 1927	Alameda	
H. C. Kelsey	Republican	January 3, 1927 – January 7, 1929	Alameda	
Albert Henry Morgan Jr.	Republican	January 7, 1929 – January 5, 1931	Alameda	
Charles W. Fisher	Republican	January 5, 1931 – January 2, 1933	Alameda	
Rodney L. Turner	Democratic	January 2, 1933 – January 4, 1943	Kern	
Julian Beck	Democratic	January 4, 1943 – September 25, 1953	Los Angeles	Resigned from the California State Assembly to become a judge.
Vacant		September 25, 1953 – January 4, 1954	Los Angeles	
Allen Miller	Democratic	January 4, 1954 – September 22, 1959	Los Angeles	Sworn in after winning a special election to fill the seat vacated by Beck. Miller Resigns after Governor Pat Brown appoints him as a judge to the Los Angeles County Superior Court.
Vacant		September 22, 1959 – December 30, 1959	Los Angeles	
Tom C. Carrell	Democratic	December 30, 1959 – January 2, 1967	Los Angeles	Sworn in after winning special election to fill the vacant seat Miller left to become a judge.
David Negri	Democratic	January 2, 1967 – January 6, 1969	Los Angeles	
Henry Arklin	Republican	January 6, 1969 – January 4, 1971	Los Angeles	
Jim Keysor	Democratic	January 4, 1971 – November 30, 1974	Los Angeles	
Michael D. Antonovich	Republican	December 2, 1974 – November 30, 1978	Los Angeles	
Pat Nolan	Republican	December 4, 1978 – November 30, 1992	Los Angeles	
Terry B. Friedman	Democratic	December 7, 1992 – November 30, 1994	Los Angeles	
Sheila Kuehl	Democratic	December 5, 1994 – November 30, 2000	Los Angeles	
Fran Pavley	Democratic	December 4, 2000 – November 30, 2006	Los Angeles	
Fran Pavley	Democratic	December 4, 2000 – November 30, 2006	Los Angeles, Ventura	
Julia Brownley	Democratic	December 4, 2006 – November 30, 2012	Los Angeles, Ventura	
Chris Holden	Democratic	December 3, 2012 – November 30, 2024	Los Angeles, San Bernardino	
John Harabedian	Democratic	December 2, 2024 – present	Los Angeles	

== Election results (1990–present) ==
=== 2024 ===
2024 California State Assembly 41st district election
Primary election
Party	Candidate	Votes	%
Republican	Michelle Del Rosario Martinez	48,800	39.8
Democratic	John Harabedian	36,454	29.7
Democratic	Phlunté Riddle	19,011	15.5
Democratic	Jed Leano	18,356	15.0
Total votes		122,621	100.0
General election
Democratic	John Harabedian	137,293	58.5
Republican	Michelle Del Rosario Martinez	97,336	41.5
Total votes		234,629	100.0
Democratic hold			

=== 2022 ===
2022 California State Assembly 41st district election
Primary election
Party	Candidate	Votes	%
Democratic	Chris Holden (incumbent)	74,735	96.7
Republican	Michael McMahon (write-in)	2,580	3.3
Total votes		77,315	100.0
General election
Democratic	Chris Holden (incumbent)	104,740	60.0
Republican	Michael McMahon	69,835	40.0
Total votes		174,575	100.0
Democratic hold			

=== 2020 ===
2020 California State Assembly 41st district election
Primary election
Party	Candidate	Votes	%
Democratic	Chris Holden (incumbent)	94,505	68.7
Republican	Robin A. Hvidston	43,006	31.3
Total votes		137,511	100.0
General election
Democratic	Chris Holden (incumbent)	160,878	65.3
Republican	Robin A. Hvidston	85,604	34.7
Total votes		264,482	100.0
Democratic hold			

=== 2018 ===
2018 California State Assembly 41st district election
Primary election
Party	Candidate	Votes	%
Democratic	Chris Holden (incumbent)	54,707	59.8
No party preference	Alan S. Reynolds	25,345	27.7
Democratic	Kenneth (Kenny) Rotter	11,420	12.5
Total votes		91,472	100.0
General election
Democratic	Chris Holden (incumbent)	113,439	64.2
No party preference	Alan S. Reynolds	63,272	35.8
Total votes		176,711	100.0
Democratic hold			

=== 2016 ===
2016 California State Assembly 41st district election
Primary election
Party	Candidate	Votes	%
Democratic	Chris Holden (incumbent)	66,951	59.2
Republican	Casey C. Higgins	30,017	26.6
Republican	Dan M. Taylor	8,891	7.9
No party preference	Alan S. Reynolds	7,143	6.3
Total votes		113,002	100.0
General election
Democratic	Chris Holden (incumbent)	120,633	60.5
Republican	Casey C. Higgins	78,817	39.5
Total votes		199,450	100.0
Democratic hold			

=== 2014 ===
2014 California State Assembly 41st district election
Primary election
Party	Candidate	Votes	%
Democratic	Chris Holden (incumbent)	35,296	98.1
Republican	Nathaniel Tsai (write-in)	394	1.1
Republican	Samuel S. Forsen (write-in)	120	0.3
Libertarian	Ted Brown (write-in)	84	0.2
Republican	Linda Hazelton (write-in)	83	0.2
Total votes		35,977	100.0
General election
Democratic	Chris Holden (incumbent)	62,810	59.3
Republican	Nathaniel Tsai	43,126	40.7
Total votes		105,936	100.0
Democratic hold			

=== 2012 ===
2012 California State Assembly 41st district election
Primary election
Party	Candidate	Votes	%
Democratic	Chris Holden	20,718	29.4
Republican	Donna Lowe	16,808	23.8
Republican	Ed Colton	12,399	17.6
Democratic	Michael Cacciotti	10,844	15.4
Democratic	Victoria Rusnak	9,727	13.8
Total votes		70,496	100.0
General election
Democratic	Chris Holden	109,743	57.7
Republican	Donna Lowe	80,362	42.3
Total votes		190,105	100.0
Democratic hold			

=== 2010 ===
2010 California State Assembly 41st district election
Party	Candidate	Votes	%
Democratic	Julia Brownley (incumbent)	84,222	58.8
Republican	Terry Rathbun	53,243	37.2
Green	Linda Piera-Ávila	5,837	4.0
Total votes		143,302	100.0
Democratic hold			

=== 2008 ===
2008 California State Assembly 41st district election
Party	Candidate	Votes	%
Democratic	Julia Brownley (incumbent)	117,761	66.1
Republican	Mark Bernsley	60,350	33.9
Total votes		178,111	100.0
Democratic hold			

=== 2006 ===
2006 California State Assembly 41st district election
Party	Candidate	Votes	%
Democratic	Julia Brownley	78,380	61.7
Republican	Tony Dolz	44,543	35.1
Libertarian	Conrad Frankowski	4,027	3.2
Total votes		126,950	100.0
Democratic hold			

=== 2004 ===
2004 California State Assembly 41st district election
Party	Candidate	Votes	%
Democratic	Fran Pavley (incumbent)	106,761	59.7
Republican	Heather Peters	64,029	35.8
Libertarian	Richard P. Koffler	8,033	4.5
Total votes		178,823	100.0
Democratic hold			

=== 2002 ===
2002 California State Assembly 41st district election
Party	Candidate	Votes	%
Democratic	Fran Pavley (incumbent)	71,614	61.5
Republican	Michael J. Wissot	40,708	34.9
Libertarian	Brian "Max" Kelly	4,244	3.6
Total votes		116,566	100.0
Democratic hold			

=== 2000 ===
2000 California State Assembly 41st district election
Party	Candidate	Votes	%
Democratic	Fran Pavley	101,129	60.5
Republican	Jayne Murphy Shapiro	58,562	35.0
Libertarian	Colin S. Goldman	7,527	4.5
Total votes		167,218	100.0
Democratic hold			

=== 1998 ===
1998 California State Assembly 41st district election
Party	Candidate	Votes	%
Democratic	Sheila Kuehl (incumbent)	82,302	62.7
Republican	K. Paul Jhin	45,414	34.6
Peace and Freedom	John Honigsfeld	3,479	2.7
Total votes		131,195	100.0
Democratic hold			

=== 1996 ===
1996 California State Assembly 41st district election
Party	Candidate	Votes	%
Democratic	Sheila Kuehl (incumbent)	85,151	55.2
Republican	Mark Boon Benhard	58,613	38.0
Peace and Freedom	John Honigsfeld	4,479	2.9
Libertarian	Phil Baron	3,827	2.5
Natural Law	Marys Small	2,078	1.3
Total votes		154,148	100.0
Democratic hold			

=== 1994 ===
1994 California State Assembly 41st district election
Party	Candidate	Votes	%
Democratic	Sheila Kuehl	76,976	55.6
Republican	Michael T. Meehan	57,410	41.5
Libertarian	Philip W. Baron	4,077	2.9
Total votes		138,463	100.0
Democratic hold			

=== 1992 ===
1992 California State Assembly 41st district election
Party	Candidate	Votes	%
Democratic	Terry B. Freidman (incumbent)	101,516	55.4
Republican	Christine Reed	72,580	39.6
Libertarian	Roy A. Sykes, Jr.	9,265	5.1
Total votes		183,361	100.0
Democratic gain from Republican			

=== 1990 ===
1990 California State Assembly 41st district election
Party	Candidate	Votes	%
Republican	Pat Nolan (incumbent)	50,814	56.4
Democratic	Jeannette Mann	34,270	38.0
Libertarian	Curtis S. Helms	3,139	3.5
Peace and Freedom	David Velasquez	1,939	2.2
Total votes		90,162	100.0
Republican hold			

== See also ==
- California State Assembly
- California State Assembly districts
- Districts in California
