= Robert Hertzberg =

American politician and attorney (born 1954)

Bob Hertzberg
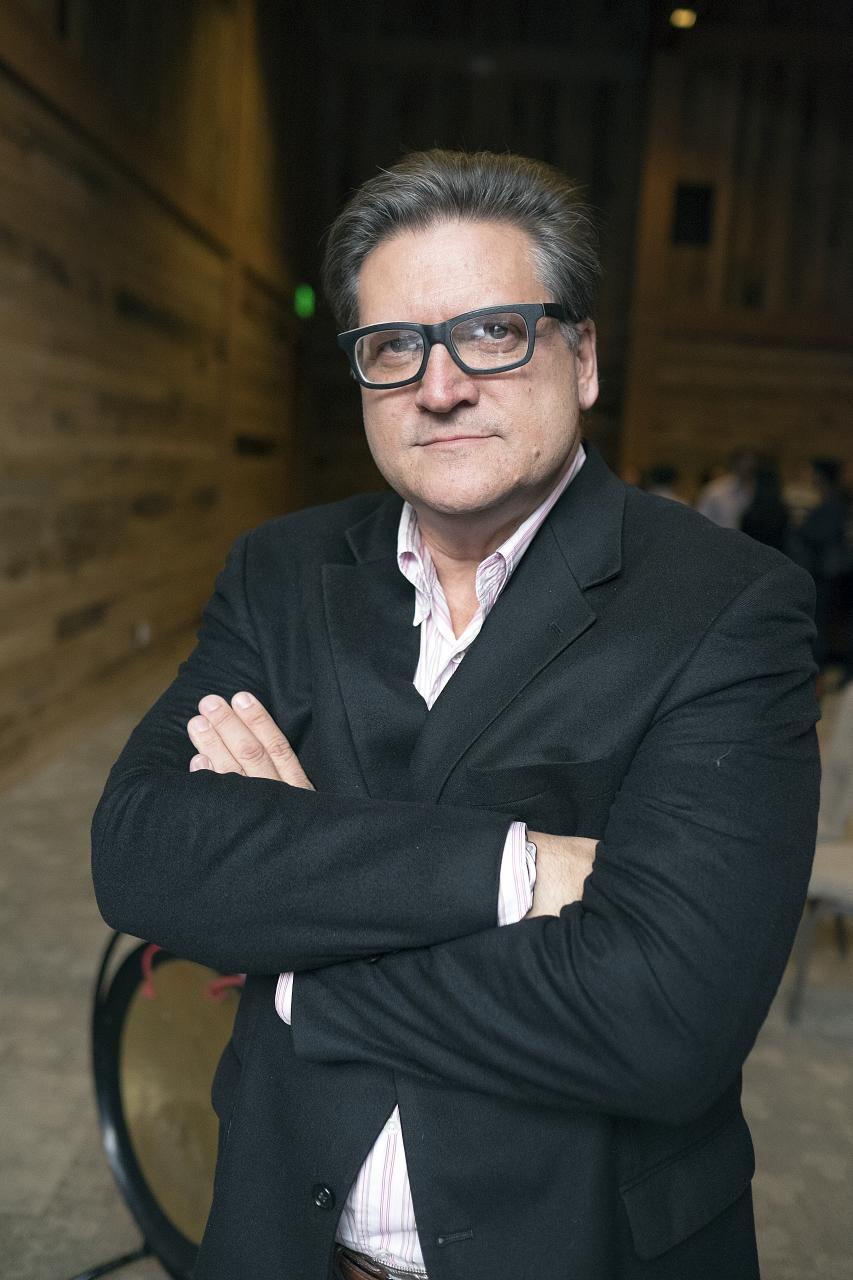

Majority Leader of the California Senate
- In office January 7, 2019 – January 19, 2022
- Preceded by: Bill Monning
- Succeeded by: Mike McGuire

Member of the California Senate from the 18th district
- In office December 1, 2014 – December 5, 2022
- Preceded by: Alex Padilla
- Succeeded by: Steve Padilla

64th Speaker of the California State Assembly
- In office April 13, 2000 – February 6, 2002
- Preceded by: Antonio Villaraigosa
- Succeeded by: Herb Wesson

Member of the California State Assembly from the 40th district
- In office December 2, 1996 – November 30, 2002
- Preceded by: Barbara Friedman
- Succeeded by: Lloyd Levine

Personal details
- Born: Robert Myles Hertzberg; November 19, 1954 (age 71) Los Angeles, California, U.S.
- Party: Democratic
- Education: University of Redlands (BA); University of California, Hastings (JD)

Robert Myles Hertzberg (born November 19, 1954) is an American politician who previously served in the California State Senate. A Democrat, he represented the 18th Senate District, which includes parts of the San Fernando Valley.

Prior to being elected to the State Senate in 2014, he served as the 64th Speaker of the California State Assembly, representing the 40th Assembly District and was elected into the Speakership in a unanimous vote. He was Majority Leader from January 2019 to January 2022. He announced he would not seek re-election because of term limits and instead announced his candidacy for the Los Angeles County Board of Supervisors. He lost the supervisor election to Lindsey Horvath.

Hertzberg was also chairman of solar and hydrogen energy companies during his political career. He was named by The Guardian as “One of 50 Persons Who Could Save the Planet.”

Four years after leaving office, Hertzberg was named No. 10 on the California state political newsletter Capitol Weekly's Top 100 in 2026. He was the only formerly elected official on the list.

== Early life and education ==
Hertzberg was born the third of five sons in Downtown Los Angeles. His father, Harrison Hertzberg, was a constitutional lawyer. He grew up in Benedict Canyon, Los Angeles. The family later moved to Palm Springs, California. He went to Palm Springs High School then graduated magna cum laude from the University of Redlands in 1976 with a Bachelor of Arts degree in history and English. Hertzberg earned his Juris Doctor from University of California, Hastings College of the Law in 1979 and passed the bar that year.

== Legal career ==
After graduating from law school, Hertzberg was an associate at the Beverly Hills law firm of Fulop, Rolston, Burns, & McKittrick. He and his father later formed the Hertzberg & Hertzberg law firm. In 1983, he co-authored a manual on real estate law, California Lis Pendens Practice, published by the University of California, with a second edition eleven years later. The younger Hertzberg left in 1985 and sued his father over the firm's assets in 1986, seeking $1 million in punitive damages. After his father's passing in 1987, the case was settled as part of the estate.

After Hertzberg retired from the State Assembly in 2002, Mickey Kantor recruited him to full partnership at Mayer Brown LLP, formerly Mayer, Brown, Rowe & Maw. At the firm, Hertzberg specialized in government affairs, providing strategic advice to business. He was interested in the fields of the environment, climate change, energy, water and Native American rights-related issues, as well as the telecom and real estate industries.

Hertzberg left Mayer Brown in 2014, after being sworn in as a State Senator. Shortly after being elected to the California State Senate in November 2014, Hertzberg was hired as a "of counsel" government affairs attorney with the Los Angeles law firm Glaser Weil. Hana Callaghan, director of the Markkula Center for Applied Ethics, has raised concerns over potential conflict of interests, as the firm services many clients who are affected by state legislation. In December 2017, he and Glaser Weil mutually agreed to the suspension of their relationship, following sexual assault allegations against State Assemblyman Matt Dababneh, who was represented by Glaser Weil.

== Political career ==
Hertzberg experience with politics begin at 19 as a driver for State Senator Mervyn Dymally, who ran in the Lieutenant Governor of California race, in 1974. There he built his networks within the Latino political circles, including Gloria Molina, Richard Alatorre, and Antonio Villaraigosa. He also worked on the campaigns of U.S. Representatives Dennis Cardoza, Julian Dixon, Xavier Becerra, Lucy Roybal-Allard, and Hilda Solis, L.A. City Council members Mike Hernandez and Herb Wesson, and also State Assembly members Hersh Rosenthal. Hertzberg did legal work for Los Angeles County Supervisor Gloria Molina. He was later appointed to the California State Board of Pharmacy.

=== California State Assembly ===
==== Campaigns ====
In 1994, Hertzberg contemplated running for the 40th Assembly District, which encompassed North Hollywood to Canoga Park in the San Fernando Valley, but never announced his candidacy.

In 1996, Assemblywoman Barbara Friedman of the 40th Assembly District termed out. In the March Democratic primaries, Hertzberg ran against Francine Oschin, aide to Los Angeles City Councilmember Hal Bernson. According to the California Political Almanac, Hertzberg "racked up a sheaf of endorsements and raised well over $200,000 for the primary." He won the primary with 72% of the vote. In the November general election, Hertzberg had a 59–31% victory over Republican Ron Culver.

In 1998 and 2000, Hertzberg was re-elected with 69% and 70% respectively.

==== Tenure ====
Term limits in the Assembly meant a large influx of new members with every new session. Hertzberg created the California Assembly Program for Innovative Training and Orientation for the Legislature (CAPITOL) Institute with Assemblyman Bill Leonard in 2000 to educate first time legislators and their staff. They offered training on a variety of topics: including ethics, legislative deadlines, key personnel at the capital, voting procedures, restrictions, and committees. After his tenure as Speaker ended, the succeeding Speaker Herb Wesson named the Capitol Institute after Hertzberg. Hertzberg also created the Speaker's Office of International Relations and Protocol.

==== Speaker of the Assembly (2000–2002) ====
In November 1999, Antonio Villaraigosa announced his resignation as Speaker of the Assembly the following April to run for Los Angeles mayor in 2001 and immediately endorsed Hertzberg as his replacement. Assemblymen Kevin Shelley and Carole Migden of San Francisco and Tony Cárdenas of Sylmar were seen as potential opponents for the position.

On April 13, 2000, Hertzberg was unanimously elected by a voice vote as the 64th Speaker of the California State Assembly. As of 2026, Hertberg was the last speaker to have been elected unanimously. He was also the first speaker from the San Fernando Valley to hold the speakership since Bob Moretti in 1971, and the first Jewish speaker since Edgar C. Levey in 1927. In 1996, when Hertzberg first ran for the Assembly, the Democrats had 38 of 80 seats. By November 2000, when Hertzberg was directing the Assembly Democratic campaigns, his party was up to 50 seats and he was the last Speaker to gain seats until the Obama landslide of 2008.

Shortly after being elected, Hertzberg negotiated an agreement between Governor Gray Davis, State Senate President Pro Tem John Burton, and the California Teachers’ Association to permanently add nearly $2 billion to state education funding. He also co-sponsored bills to increase access to voting, accessibility of the state government over the internet, the creation of more forensic laboratories, decrease taxes for small business and consumers, and increase funds to the Cal-Grant program.

He also worked with Republicans and U.S. House of Representatives Leader Nancy Pelosi to negotiate a redistricting plan that passed the Assembly and the State Senate.

After the September 11, 2001 attacks, Hertzberg temporarily shut down the State Assembly and created the bipartisan Legislative Task Force on Terrorism to combat potential threats to California's food and water supplies. Hertzberg also sponsored anti-terrorism bills prior to the attacks in 1999.

In 2002, he sponsored another school bond bill measure, which was approved by the state's voters. This was in addition to his sponsorship to place school bond measures on the 1998 and 2000 ballots. The bonds built nearly 10,000 new public schools and further funded the campus of the University of California, Merced.

=== 2005 Los Angeles mayoral election ===
==== Campaign ====
A steady series of fundraising scandals, where members of Mayor James Hahn's Administration were investigated by a grand jury for allegedly awarding city contracts to campaign contributors, and the general attitudes towards Hahn prompted many people to join the mayoral race in 2005.

Hertzberg termed out of the California State Assembly in 2002 and transitioned back to private law practice. He launched his mayoral campaign in June 2004 with an extensively produced website at ChangeLA.com. The website attacked Hahn's leadership and encouraged readers to donate and interact with Hertzberg. It has been likened to Vermont Governor Howard Dean's digital campaign in the 2004 Democratic Party presidential primaries, which elevated Dean's name recognition from unknown governor to apparent frontrunner. Hertzberg told the Los Angeles Times that he while he made more money doing business and conducting his law practice, he ran out of a sense of civic duty. However, half of Los Angeles city voters did not know much about Hertzberg.

Hertzberg was the first to launch a TV campaign in the race, which featured a giant image of him towering over a city full of problems. He was endorsed by Education Secretary, and former Los Angeles mayor, Richard Riordan.

A second Los Angeles Times poll found the primary too close to call, with Hertzberg, Hahn, and Villaraigosa each with about 20% of the vote, with a very high likelihood for a runoff election. Hahn's supporters ran negative mailers, linking Hertzberg and Villaraigosa to Enron and drug dealer Carlos Vignali during their time in the State Assembly. An analysis by the Los Angeles Times showed that Hertzberg was popular among Hahn's base, which included San Fernando Valley residents, conservatives, moderates, and Jewish voters. However, he struggled with young, black, and Latino voters, polling less than 5% per group and well behind his opponents. Hertzberg also won twice as many precincts as Hahn but fell short when Hahn's negative ads decreased his support in the Valley. Hertzberg placed third in the primary election after Hahn and Villaraigosa, with the most votes of any candidates in the San Fernando Valley. An editorial in the Los Angeles Times claimed a dull run-off debate between Hahn and Villaraigosa made them "miss Bob Hertzberg and his outsized ideas". After missing the run-off election, Hertzberg endorsed Villaraigosa. Villaraigosa would go on to defeat Hahn 59% vs 41%. Hertzberg was appointed by mayor-elect Villaraigosa as chair of his transition team.

==== Platform ====
Hertzberg ran as a moderate Democrat. His platform included the breaking up the Los Angeles Unified School District, calling the District's 50% dropout rate the biggest threat to the city's future, despite not having any control over the department as mayor. Governor Arnold Schwarzenegger did not endorse any candidates, despite his close working relationship with Hertzberg, probably due to souring attitudes towards him by the city's Democratic majority. However, he has expressed support for Hertzberg's plan to break up the Los Angeles Unified School District, although he did not specify which parts. He also advocated for a "Commuters' Bill of Rights" to help ease traffic congestion. He opposed raising taxes for more police officers, but pledged to hire more officers.

=== California State Senate ===
==== Campaigns ====
In May 2013, Hertzberg announced his candidacy for the Senate seat representing California's 18th State Senate district. His announcement was followed up by a slew of endorsements by state officials, including Ted Lieu, Raul Bocanegra, Tony Cárdenas, and Alex Padilla, and local representatives, including Felipe Fuentes and Curren Price. He credited his time co-founding the Think Long Committee with billionaire Nicholas Bergguen and successfully drafting legislation as motivation to re-enter the political scene. He placed first in the June 2014 primary elections with 63.1%, with Republican candidate Ricardo Benitez placing second with 29.1%. Hertzberg won the general election in November 2014 with around 70%.

He defeated Republican challenger Rudy Melendez with 78.1% of the vote in the November 2018 election, the highest of any California Senate seat that year. When asked about his legislative priorities in 2018, he listed tax reform, economic Opportunity Zones, simplification of government forms, refining the bail reform law, and updating disaster related infrastructure. He was sworn in for his second and final Senate term on December 3, 2018.

For his second term in the State Senate, Hertzberg told planningreport.com that his main goals were reforming the tax system and budget process to make state revenues less volatile, developing renewable energy markets for California, capturing rainwater to help irrigate the San Fernando Valley water basins, and using blockchain and other technologies to improve access to government services and officials.

==== Tenure ====
In December 2018, Senate President Pro Tempore Toni Atkins appointed Hertzberg Senate Majority Leader for the 2018–19 Legislative Session.

===== Technology =====
In 2018, Hertzberg introduced a bill to identify automated social media accounts as bots with full disclosure. He has said that the bill was aimed at preventing internet fraud, particularly in politics and advertising. Early drafts of the bill would have required undisclosed bots to be removed and covered all bots, not just political and commercial ones. These provisions were later removed after backlash from the Internet Association and the Electronic Frontier Foundation, whom were concerned about potential conflicts with the First Amendment. The Bolstering Online Transparency (BOT) Act was signed into law on October 1, 2018, by Governor Jerry Brown. It went into effect on July 1, 2019, with violators facing fines related to unfair competition.

In 2018, Hertzberg announced a bill that would allow the transfer of corporate share certificates through blockchain. The bill has yet to be passed. He also sponsored a bill that allowed counties to issue marriage, birth, and death certificates via blockchain, which was signed into law. He also was part of a legislative study group studying the possibilities of using blockchain in California government.

===== Judicial =====
During his first term in the state senate, Hertzberg, with Rob Bonta, helped pass SB10, which would end cash bail in California by allowing judges to determine if a defendant could be released before a trial. It received broad Democratic support and one Republican vote from John Moorlach. The bill has received editorial endorsements from major newspapers across the state, including the Los Angeles Times, The Mercury News, Sacramento Bee, The San Diego Union-Tribune, and San Francisco Chronicle.

===== Housing =====
Hertzberg opposed SB 10, a bill that would enable city and county governments to allow for denser housing near transit-rich areas, jobs-rich areas or urban infill sites. Hertzberg described the bill as "a way to destroy single-family neighborhoods." He was the sole member of his committee to oppose the bill.

===== Environment =====
In August 2020, Hertzberg voted against the bill AB-345, which would have required a minimum setback distance of 2,500 between oil wells and public areas where children are present, in a 5–4 decision. The bill's author, State Assemblyman Al Muratsuchi, has said that there was strong opposition from oil and gas industry trade unions, who the Los Angeles Times has noted are major supporters of Democratic candidates. Hertzberg said that he opposed the bill because it was redundant as Governor Gavin Newsom had already signed another bill in 2019 with similar intentions of setting up buffer zones. This decision prompted the local chapter of the youth-led environmental activism group Sunrise Movement to protest outside of his home in Van Nuys.

In 2022, Sen. Hertzberg partnered with the Governor’s office to secure the passage of multiple historic climate measures, including SB 1137 which created a setback of 3,200 feet for all oil wells and established a first in the nation ban on single use plastics with Sb 54. Both bills had languished in the legislature for years before Senator Hertzberg got them both passed in his final year in office.

In addition, Hertzberg's sponsored SB 529 and its companion bill, SB 1174, that relaxed the regulations regarding utilities building electrical transmission facilities. The bills were part of a larger package of legislation, the California Climate Commitment, signed by Governor Newsom.

Upon leaving the California State Senate in 2022, Hertzberg resumed his private law practice with his office in Simi Valley.

In early 2023 Hertzberg was named as a senior fellow to the Mission Possible Partnership, an alliance of climate leaders focused on supercharging efforts to decarbonise some of the world’s highest-emitting industries in the next 10 years.

He was also co-chair of California Forward, a member of The Think Long Committee of California, and served on the boards of Claremont College, Pepperdine University, the University of Southern California, and the Goldman School of Public Policy at the University of California, Berkeley.

=== Los Angeles County Board of Supervisors ===
Hertzberg ran to represent the third district on the Los Angeles County Board of Supervisors, winning the primary but losing the run-off. Hertzberg's son ran to fill his father's former seat, but lost to Caroline Menjivar.

== Other work ==
=== Investment in renewable energy ===
Outside of his law practice, Hertzberg has been active in the alternative energy industry. In January 2008, The Guardian named Hertzberg as one of the "50 People Who Could Save the Planet" for his investments in solar energy. Hertzberg co-founded Solar Integrated Technology in 2003 in south-central Los Angeles. It would be the first plant producing renewable energy in Los Angeles and was the Wall Street Journal's recipient of the "Innovation Award" in the Energy and Power sector in 2005. He sold his shares in the company to run in the 2005 Los Angeles mayoral race. It later debuted on Alternative Investment Market of the London Stock Exchange in May 2004. There was an increased interest and demand to invest in clean energy companies following the activation of the Kyoto Protocol in 2005, with billions invested the following year in private and public markets. Hertzberg co-founded the investment firm Renewable Capital in 2006.

Renewable Capital was formed in the UK as an investment firm based in London to help finance alternative energy ventures because of its suitable business policies. Hertzberg told The New York Times, "California does have this great image, but Europe still is much greener than anywhere in the United States, by several orders of magnitude. The financial markets and those who control the big funds understand the importance of renewable energy." He also serves on the Board of the First Public Hydrogen.

==== G24 Innovations ====
Hertzberg co-founded Cardiff, Wales, based G24 Innovations (G24i) in 2006 with the intentions of selling lightweight solar cells to the African market. In February 2009, G24i had $100 million in venture funding. The company's main focus was on silicon-less solar panels with technology rights they bought from Swiss scientist Michael Grätzel that allowed for light capture at lower rates but at any light level. They moved into an abandoned Acer factory and it opened August 2011 with help from the Welsh Government and UK Government. The company has gone on to win several industry awards and has transitioned, and found success, selling solar strips to power iPad keyboard cases. G24i's wind turbines powered the factory, making it the first factory creating renewable energy to be powered by renewable energy.

G24i went into administration in December 2012 and was later acquired in 2013 by solar cell company G24 Power in Newport, Wales.

=== Public policy ===
From 2009 to 2012, Hertzberg chaired California Forward whose self-declared mission is "to work with Californians to help create a "smart" government – one that's small enough to listen, big enough to tackle real problems, smart enough to spend our money wisely in good times and bad, and honest enough to be held accountable for results."

In 2010, billionaire Nicolas Berggruen and Hertzberg founded the Think Long Committee for California. The Committee describes its mission to "advocate a comprehensive approach to repairing California's broken system of governance while proposing policies and institutions vital for the state's long-term future."

Hertzberg chaired the Los Angeles Economic Development Corporation, in 2004 and 2011.

In 2021, Hertzberg co-authored (with Eric Schmidt and Evan Spiegel) an opinion piece in the Los Angeles Times advocating that California invest directly in its youth by buying every Californian under the age of 18 an account of stocks that would pay dividends and be used for retirement, education loans, or home purchases.

Hertzberg also proposed a voter initiative to increase the supply of housing in California. This ballot measure, the Second Mortgage Homebuyer Program and Revenue Bond Initiative, would allow any California resident to borrow up to 97% of any home’s purchase price, instead of requiring a 20% down payment. Hertzberg said he felt financing a home was increasingly difficult for the middle class. The measure is scheduled to go before voters in November 2026.

=== Political advisory roles ===
After Arnold Schwarzenegger's election as California governor in the 2003 recall election, Hertzberg served as both a formal and informal advisor to Schwarzenegger. In 2003, Schwarzenegger appointed him to his Transition Committee and Hertzberg helped guide the passage of the new governor's "Economic Recovery Package" through the legislature that allowed the state to weather the financial crisis of 2003–04. According to The People's Machine by Joe Matthews, Schwarzenegger then offered Hertzberg the position of Chief of Staff, nicknaming him "Hertzie." Hertzberg chose to stay in the private sector but did advise Schwarzenegger to "build a thoroughly bipartisan government." Hertzberg wrote in the Los Angeles Daily News that his advice was: "Take the initiative to go and meet with members of the Legislature, Democrats and Republicans alike. Sit in their offices, meet with them as human beings, and learn to work with them."

After finishing a close third in the 2005 mayoral election, Hertzberg served as the chair of Mayor-elect Villaraigosa's Transition Team.

In 2009, Hertzberg also served as the co-chair of the Transition Team for newly elected Los Angeles City Attorney, Carmen Trutanich.

Four years after leaving the senate, Hertzberg was named No. 10 in Capitol Weekly's Top 100 in 2026, a list compiled by the California state political website of the state's influential people in policy and politics. Hertzberg was the only formerly elected official on the list for that year.

== Public image ==
Hertzberg calls himself a "New Democrat" in the mold of Bill Clinton, who is both pro-business and pro-labor. He is a proponent of regionalism, open primaries, and a non-partisan State government.

Hertzberg has been given the nicknames "Huggy" and "Hugsberg" for his habit of offering embraces to colleagues, employees, voters and even opponents. The journal Capitol Weekly has repeatedly named him one of the Top 100 influential people in Sacramento, writing in 2011: "Bob Hertzberg is one of those hyper-kinetic, Type-A personalities who love politics for its own sake. He's a former Assembly speaker, an L.A. lawyer and a go-to guy for his ideas on political reform. Amazingly, he was a sort of adviser to former Gov. Arnold Schwarzenegger, and he continues to be an insider Democrat with his fingers in lots of pies."

Assemblyman Darrell Steinberg commented on Hertzberg's role as a link between Schwarzenegger and the state legislature, saying that Hertzberg would report "what the Democratic legislative line was — where we couldn't go and where we were willing to go. And he had the trust of the principals on both sides, which helped quite a bit." In his autobiography Total Recall, Arnold Schwarzenegger relates how he went to meet with Speaker Hertzberg in 2002 to seek support for his successful "After-school" initiative:"

"One of my first stops was Bob Hertzberg, the Speaker of the Assembly. Bob is a smart, ebullient from the San Fernando Valley, about the same age as Maria. He's so friendly that his nickname is Huggy. Within two minutes, we were swapping jokes. 'What's not to like?' he said about our ballot proposition. But he warned me not to expect support from the Democratic Party itself. 'God forbid we should endorse a Republican initiative,' he wisecracked."

— Arnold Schwarzenegger, Total Recall

=== Workplace misconduct accusations ===
Hertzberg came under public scrutiny for his lingering embraces as two female lawmakers and a former female legislator complained that the intimate embraces made them uncomfortable, according to an interview by the Sacramento Bee. Two of the women said that Hertzberg hugged them again even after they had asked him to stop.

Former California Assemblywoman Linda Halderman said that after she told Hertzberg she wasn't a hugger, he grabbed her anyway. "It was like dirty dancing. It was gross," she told the Sacramento Bee. "I was really just kind of horrified, because you don't do that. You just don't do that. It was so out of context and inappropriate." The Assemblywoman also described Hertzberg's actions in one hug as "clearly a sexual thing, rather than a friendly thing." The Assemblywoman told Hertzberg: "Don't touch me." Hertzberg responded by grabbing the Assemblywoman, pinning her arms by her side and thrusting his groin against her pelvis. Hertzberg then restricted the Assemblywoman from moving away, forcing prolonged torso-to-torso contact despite her shouting at him to let her go.

The former California Assemblywoman declined to meet with lawyers hired by the California Senate to investigate her allegation concerning Hertzberg in stating that "I don't want any involvement with these people," and "I don't respect how they've handled it." While the California Senate ordered him to stop hugging co-workers after an investigation determined that his behavior made two female legislators and a male sergeant-at-arms uncomfortable, the summary report of the investigation released by outside lawyers concluded that Hertzberg's hugs were "not sexual in nature." According to the Los Angeles Times report detailing the conclusion of the investigation, the report found that Hertzberg likely hugged the Former Assemblywoman on one occasion, but it said "the record did not support her assertion that he hugged her on multiple occasions or that he did so after she asked him to stop." Hertzberg was reprimanded.

==== Repercussions ====
The issue came up in the media again when a man connected to the bail industry set up a "Victims Hotline" website and video in December aimed at collecting stories about the Senator – just days after the allegations surfaced. A video circulating on Facebook was found to be produced by backers of California's bail industry; an industry Hertzberg is trying to reform. Adama Iwu, one of the founders of the We Said Enough movement in the Sacramento Capitol, added that it appeared that the bail agent was taking advantage of the situation "for some kind of political gain."

Another California lawmaker, former state Senator Tony Mendoza, who had been suspended amid a sexual misconduct investigation sued the California Senate. The Latino lawmaker argued that race was playing a role in his treatment, noting that Hertzberg, who is Jewish, had not been asked to step aside despite allegations he inappropriately hugged people. The former California Assemblywoman who complained about Hertzberg's conduct also questioned why Hertzberg had been able to continue his work as a lawmaker during the investigation of his conduct when the other California lawmaker (who is Latino) was barred from showing up in the building as allegations against him were being investigated.

== Personal life ==
Hertzberg has two sons. He met clinical psychologist Cynthia Telles while working for the Jewish National Fund. They divorced in 2010.

While a student at the University of Redlands, he wrote a 400-page handbook titled, A Commonsense Approach to English. In 1983, he coauthored a manual on real estate law, California Lis Pendens Practice, published by the University of California, with a second edition in 1994.

He also wrote Workin Clothes in 2021, a collection of his newspaper opinion columns and advice for future politicians.

Political offices
Preceded by Antonio Villaraigosa	Speaker of the California Assembly; 2000–2002	Succeeded by Herb Wesson
California Senate
Preceded by Bill Monning	Majority Leader of the California Senate; 2019–2022	Succeeded by Mike McGuire
