= Juan Carrillo =

Mexican-American politician

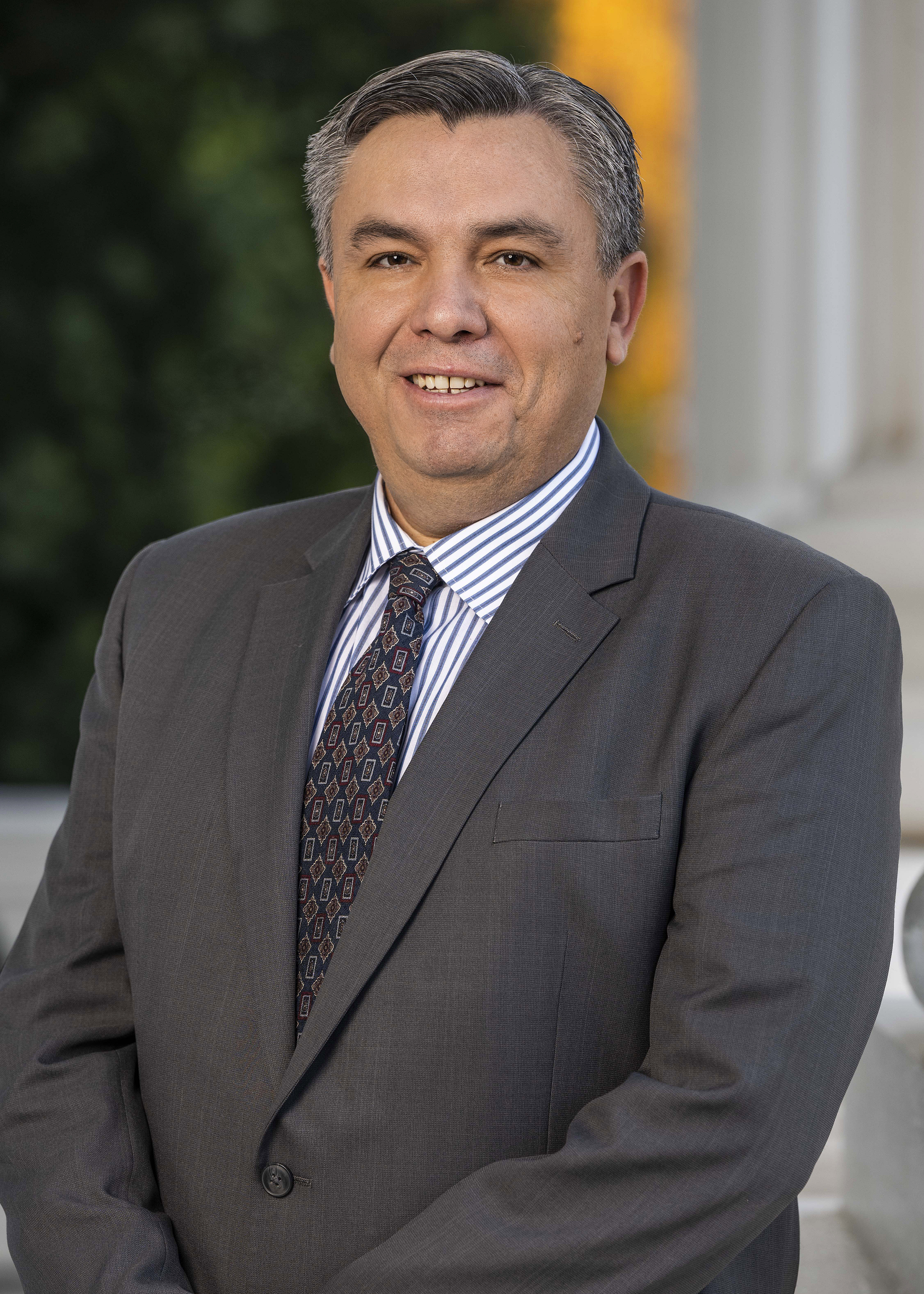
- Official portrait, 2022

Member of the California State Assembly from the 39th district
- Incumbent
- Assumed office December 5, 2022
- Preceded by: Luz Rivas

Personal details
- Born: Guadalajara, Mexico
- Party: Democratic
- Education: College of the Desert; California State Polytechnic University

Juan Carrillo is an American politician. He serves as a Democratic member for the 39th district of the California State Assembly, which includes Palmdale, Lake Los Angeles, Adelanto, and Victorville.

== Life and career ==
Carrillo was born in Guadalajara, Mexico. At the age of fifteen, he emigrated to the United States. He attended Garfield High School, College of the Desert and California State Polytechnic University.

Carrillo is a former member of the Palmdale City Council.

In June 2022, Carrillo easily defeated former State Assemblymember Steve Fox and Andrew Rosenthal in the non-partisan primary election for the 39th district of the California State Assembly. In November 2022, he defeated Paul Marsh in the general election, winning 56% of the votes. He succeeded Luz Rivas and assumed his office on December 5, 2022.

== Electoral history ==
=== Palmdale City Council ===
2016 Palmdale City Council 4th district election
Candidate	Votes	%
Juan Carrillo	3,811	52.4
Sandy Corrales	3,465	47.6
Total votes	7,276	100.0

2018 Palmdale City Council 4th district election
Candidate	Votes	%
Juan Carrillo (incumbent)	5,124	64.9
Oscar Aleman	2,772	35.1
Total votes	7,896	100.0

=== California State Assembly ===
2022 California State Assembly 39th district election
Primary election
Party	Candidate	Votes	%
Republican	Paul Andre Marsh	13,572	38.1
Democratic	Juan Carrillo	10,706	30.0
Democratic	Andrea Rosenthal	7,746	21.7
Democratic	Steve G. Fox	3,615	10.1
Total votes		35,639	100.0
General election
Democratic	Juan Carrillo	37,531	57.0
Republican	Paul Andre Marsh	28,291	43.0
Total votes		65,822	100.0
Democratic hold			

2024 California State Assembly 39th district election
Primary election
Party	Candidate	Votes	%
Democratic	Juan Carrillo (incumbent)	22,339	53.3
Republican	Paul Marsh	19,565	46.7
Total votes		41,904	100.0
General election
Democratic	Juan Carrillo (incumbent)	72,152	57.7
Republican	Paul Marsh	52,871	42.3
Total votes		125,023	100.0
Democratic hold			
