= Celeste Rodriguez =

American politician (born 1990)

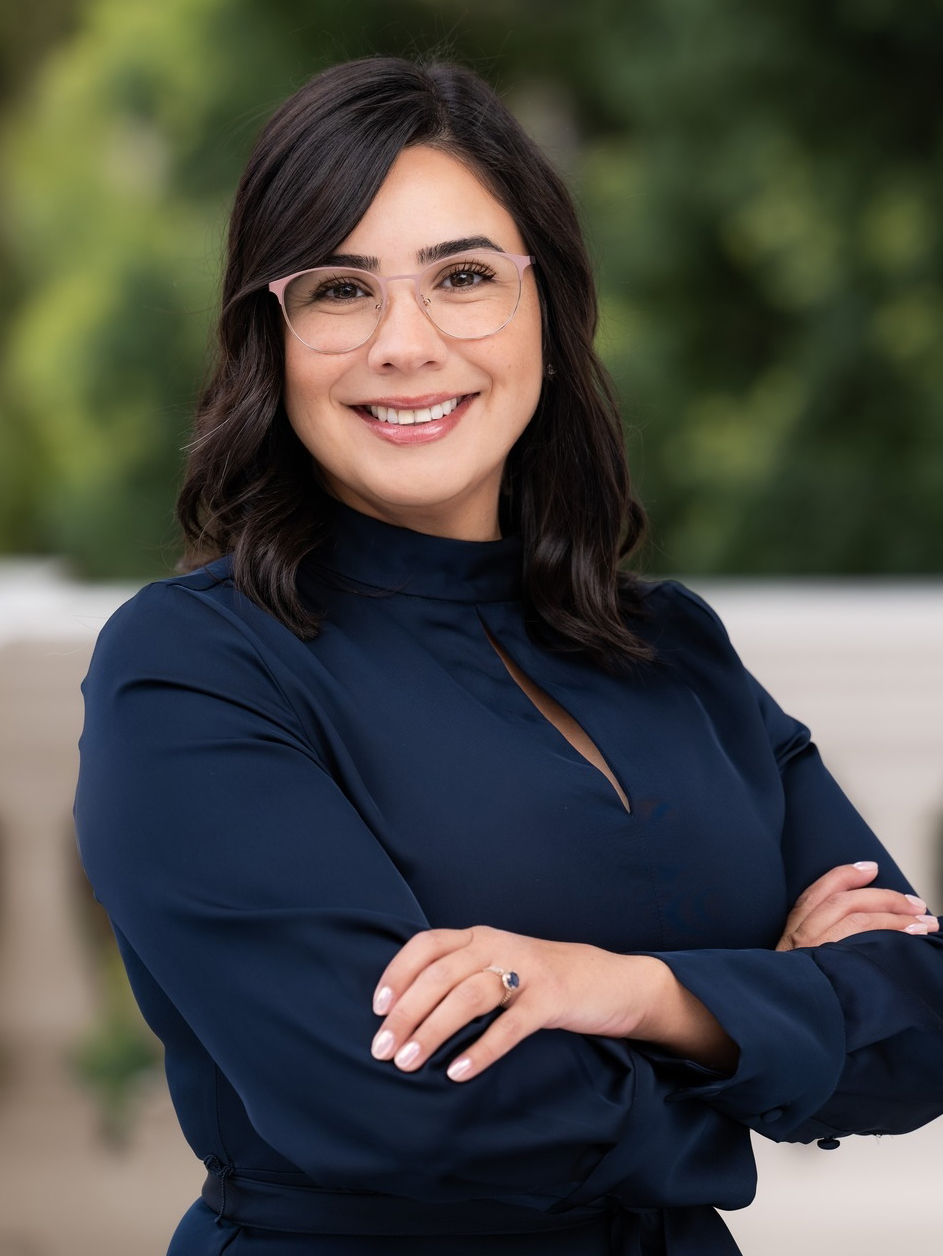
- Official portrait, 2024

Member of the California State Assembly from the 43rd district
- Incumbent
- Assumed office December 2, 2024
- Preceded by: Luz Rivas

Mayor of San Fernando
- In office December 14, 2022 – December 2, 2024
- Preceded by: Mary Mendoza
- Succeeded by: Mary Mendoza

Member of the San Fernando City Council
- In office December 7, 2020 – December 2, 2024
- Succeeded by: Patty López

Personal details
- Born: 1990 (age 35–36)
- Party: Democratic
- Spouse: Robert Gonzales
- Children: 1
- Education: Los Angeles Mission College (AA); San Diego State University (BEc); University of Southern California (MSW)

Celeste T. Rodriguez (born 1990) is an American politician who is a member of the California State Assembly representing the 43rd district, based in the eastern San Fernando Valley. Elected in the 2024 election, she previously served as a councilor and Mayor of San Fernando, California.

== Early life and career ==
Rodriguez was born in 1990, graduated from James Monroe High School and later earned an associate degree from Los Angeles Mission College. She later attended and graduated from San Diego State University and later earned a Master of Social Work at the University of Southern California. She started her public service at Recreation and Community Services Department and later moved to the Office of Economic Opportunity in Los Angeles.

== Political career ==
In 2020, Rodriguez announced that she would be running for the San Fernando City Council. She defeated Mayor Joel Fajardo by 24 votes in the general election, being elected with Cindy Montañez. In December 2022, Rodriguez was elected by the city council to become the Mayor of San Fernando, after previously losing a vote for vice mayor against Mary Mendoza. She was recommended by councilor Cindy Montañez, who had the unanimous support of the city council to become Mayor before turning down the position.

In January 2024, she announced that she would be running for California State Assembly for the 43rd district after incumbent Luz Rivas ran for the United States House of Representatives. She advanced to the general election with Republican Victoria Garcia, a fellow San Fernando city councilor.

== Electoral history ==
=== San Fernando City Council ===
2020 San Fernando City Council election
| Candidate | Votes | % |
|---|---|---|
| Cindy Montañez | 3,774 | 29.4 |
| Celeste Rodriguez | 3,253 | 25.4 |
| Joel Fajardo | 3,229 | 25.2 |
| Magaly Colelli | 2,581 | 20.1 |
| Total votes | 12,828 | 100.0 |

=== California State Assembly ===
2024 California State Assembly 43rd district election
Primary election
| Party | Candidate | Votes | % |
|---|---|---|---|
| Democratic | Celeste Rodriguez | 20,485 | 43.5 |
| Republican | Victoria Garcia | 11,077 | 23.5 |
| Democratic | Walter Garcia | 8,071 | 17.1 |
| Republican | Felicia Novick | 3,431 | 7.3 |
| No party preference | Carmelina Minasova | 2,045 | 4.3 |
| Democratic | Saul Hurtado | 2,024 | 4.3 |
| Total votes | | 47,133 | 100.0 |
General election
| Democratic | Celeste Rodriguez | 85,983 | 66.6 |
| Republican | Victoria Garcia | 43,028 | 33.4 |
| Total votes | | 129,011 | 100.0 |
| Democratic hold | | | |
