= Monica Rodriguez =

American politician

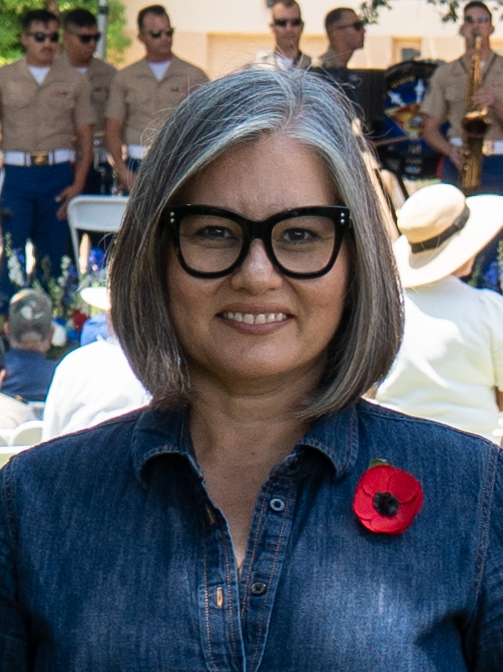
- Rodriguez in 2025

Member of the Los Angeles City Council from the 7th district
- Incumbent
- Assumed office July 1, 2017
- Preceded by: Felipe Fuentes

Personal details
- Born: 1974 (age 51–52) Los Angeles, California, U.S.
- Party: Democratic
- Education: Occidental College (BA)

Monica Rodriguez (born 1974) is an American politician in California. She currently serves as a Los Angeles City Council member, and represents the 7th district. The district is located in the San Fernando Valley, and includes the neighborhoods of Pacoima, Sunland-Tujunga, Sylmar, Shadow Hills, Sun Valley, Lake View Terrace, and Mission Hills. Rodriguez was sworn in on July 1, 2017.

== Career ==
Prior to her election to the Los Angeles City Council, Rodriguez served as Vice President of the Los Angeles Board of Public Works, overseeing essential city services. She was appointed by Los Angeles Mayor Eric Garcetti to the Board in 2013. As Vice President, she partnered with the private sector to start a rain barrel program and spearheaded an upgrade to the city's contracting website so that it was easier to use, especially for small-, minority- and women-owned businesses that have a harder time navigating the city's contracting process. She also started a small-business academy to help less-advantaged businesses gain a leg up.

Rodriguez previously served as a Community Affairs Manager for Mayor Richard Riordan and as an aide to Los Angeles City Councilmembers Mike Hernandez and Richard Alarcon. She also served as a Chief Deputy to Los Angeles Unified School Boardmember Caprice Young and as an executive in the California Realtors Association.

== Los Angeles City Council (2017—) ==
=== Elections ===
==== 2007 ====
Rodriguez first ran for City Council in 2007, to replace former Councilmember Alex Padilla, who had recently been elected to the California State Senate. Though he had been elected to the State Assembly less than four months prior, former Councilmember Richard Alarcon successfully reclaimed his old City Council seat, defeating Rodriguez and avoiding a runoff. In 2010, Alarcon was indicted on perjury and voter fraud charges for not living in his district and lying in campaign disclosure documents about his official residence. He was eventually convicted of three counts of voter fraud and one count of perjury.

==== 2017 ====
On May 16, 2017, Rodriguez was elected to represent the 7th District in the Los Angeles City Council, in a special election to fill the vacancy created when Councilmember Felipe Fuentes resigned to become a registered lobbyist. During the campaign Rodriguez received the endorsements of Mayor Eric Garcetti, the Los Angeles Times, and the Los Angeles County Democratic Party. She defeated Karo Torrossian, an aide to City Councilmember Paul Krekorian by over 1,300 votes.

After being sworn in in July 2017, Rodriguez joined Councilmember Nury Martinez as the only women on the Los Angeles City Council.

==== 2022 ====
On June 7, 2022, Rodriguez was re-elected to the 7th District with nearly 68% of the vote during the statewide direct primary election, defeating former Pacoima Neighborhood Council President Elisa Avalos.

== Personal life ==
Rodriguez lives in the Mission Hills neighborhood of Los Angeles with her husband Raul, a car salesman, and their two children. She received her undergraduate degree from Occidental College.
