= Richard Alarcon =

American politician (born 1953)

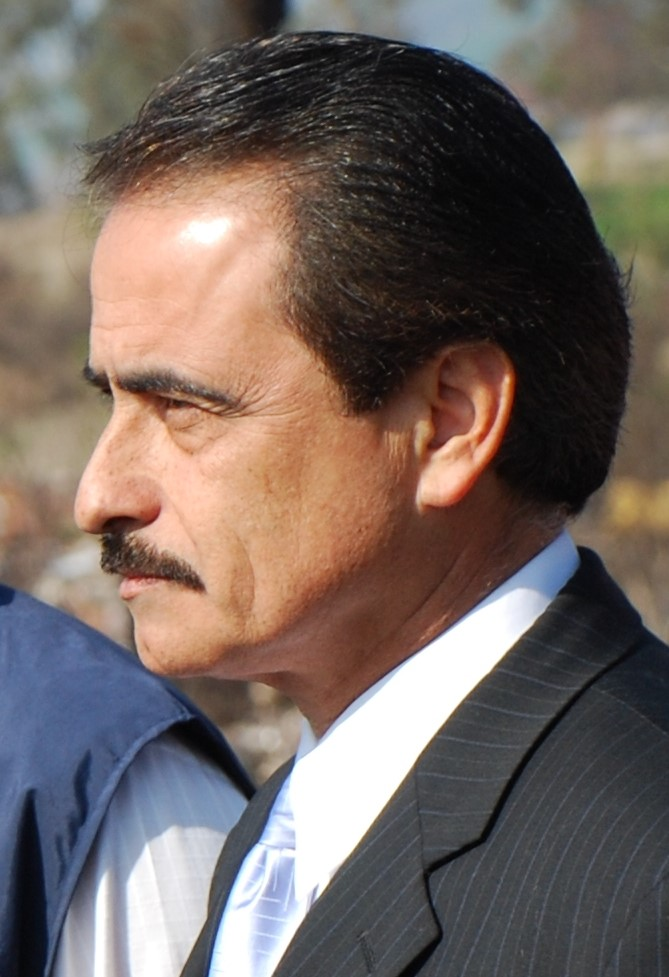
- Alarcon in 2009

Member of the California State Assembly from the 39th district
- In office December 4, 2006 – March 16, 2007
- Preceded by: Cindy Montañez
- Succeeded by: Felipe Fuentes

Member of the California State Senate from the 20th district
- In office December 7, 1998 – November 30, 2006
- Preceded by: Herschel Rosenthal
- Succeeded by: Alex Padilla

Member of the Los Angeles City Council from the 7th district
- In office July 1, 2007 – June 30, 2013
- Preceded by: Alex Padilla
- Succeeded by: Felipe Fuentes
- In office July 1, 1993 – January 3, 1999
- Preceded by: Ernani Bernardi
- Succeeded by: Alex Padilla

Personal details
- Born: Richard Anthony Alarcon; November 24, 1953 (age 72) Glendale, California, U.S.
- Party: Democratic
- Spouse(s): Corina Alarcon (divorced); Flora Montes De Oca
- Children: 4
- Education: California State University, Northridge (BA)
- Website: www.lacity.org/council/cd7/

Richard Anthony Alarcon (born November 24, 1953) is an American politician who served as a member of the Los Angeles City Council from 1993 to 1999 and again from 2007 to 2013. A Democrat, he also served in the California State Senate (1998–2006) and, for approximately three months, in the California State Assembly (2006–2007).

== Early life and education ==
Alarcon was born in Glendale, California. He earned a Bachelor of Arts degree from the California State University, Northridge.

== Career ==
Prior to entering politics, Alarcon worked as a student teacher at John H. Francis Polytechnic High School, San Fernando Middle School, and Mary Immaculate School in Pacoima, Los Angeles.

Alarcon first served as an assistant to Los Angeles Mayor Tom Bradley before winning a seat on the city council to represent the 7th district in 1993. One year into his second term as a city councilman, Alarcon resigned to become a member of the California State Senate, representing the 20th district. Term limits prevented him from seeking a third Senate term in December 2006. Among Alarcon's accomplishments while in the California Senate were workers' compensation reform and recovery funding for the community of Northridge following the 1994 Northridge earthquake. Alarcon served as majority whip during all of his eight years in the State Senate.

In 2005, Alarcon ran for mayor of Los Angeles. He finished in fifth place with less than 2% of the vote, behind Bernard Parks, Bob Hertzberg, incumbent James Hahn, and Antonio Villaraigosa. After serving as a state senator for eight years, in 2006 Alarcon ran unopposed in California's 39th State Assembly district representing the San Fernando Valley area.

Shortly after winning the Assembly seat, Alarcon announced his intention to try to return to the city council, replacing Alex Padilla, who was resigning after winning Alarcon's former State Senate seat. In the special election, held in March, Alarcon won easily (receiving 54% to 29% for his closest opponent). He resigned from the Assembly soon thereafter. His 102-day tenure in the Assembly was the shortest service in the California legislature since 1981, excluding one person elected but not sworn in as part of a legal settlement.

After serving out Padilla's city council term, Alarcon was elected to one more full term in 2009. He left the council in 2013.

== Personal life ==
Alarcon had four children. In 1987, Alarcon's three-year-old son was killed in a car accident. He is Roman Catholic.

=== Residency scandal ===
In August 2010, Alarcon was indicted on perjury and voter fraud charges for not living in his district and lying in campaign disclosure documents about his official residence. Six members of his staff testified before a grand jury. Alarcon raised at least $9,000 from donors to cover legal fees.

The charges were dismissed by Judge Kathleen Kennedy in May 2012, but District Attorney Steve Cooley refiled them. Alarcon was charged with 18 counts involving false declaration of candidacy, fraudulent voting, and perjury. On July 23, 2014, Alarcon was convicted of three counts of voter fraud and one count of perjury. After serving his full sentence through 51 days of house arrest, his conviction was overturned by an appeals court. Charges were again refiled.

In 2019, prosecutors said they would not retry their perjury and voter fraud case against Alarcon and his wife, bringing an end to a nine-year legal battle.

Political offices
Preceded by Ernani Bernardi	Los Angeles City Councilmember, 7th District; 1993–1999	Succeeded by Alex Padilla
Preceded by Herschel Rosenthal	California State Senator, 20th District; 1998–2006	Succeeded by Alex Padilla
Preceded by Cindy Montañez	California State Assemblymember, 39th District; 2006–2007	Succeeded by Felipe Fuentes
Preceded by Alex Padilla	Los Angeles City Councilmember, 7th District; 2007–2013	Succeeded by Felipe Fuentes
