= California's 39th State Assembly district =

American legislative district

Current assemblymember
Juan Carrillo; D–Palmdale
- Population (2010) • Voting age • Citizen voting age: 466,422; 343,345; 227,273
- Demographics: 20.31% White; 3.30% Black; 68.47% Latino; 6.84% Asian; 0.35% Native American; 0.13% Hawaiian/Pacific Islander; 0.29% other; 0.30% remainder of multiracial
- Registered voters: 227,835
- Registration: 52.94% Democratic; 15.13% Republican; 27.01% No party preference

California's 39th State Assembly district is one of 80 California State Assembly districts. It is currently represented by Democrat Juan Carrillo of Palmdale.

== District profile ==
The district represents heavily Hispanic portions of San Bernardino County and Los Angeles County. The district takes in portions of Lancaster and Palmdale before stretching east across mostly uninhabited areas to take in half of the region known as the High Desert, including portions of Adelanto, Victorville, and Hesperia.

== Election results from statewide races ==
Year	Office	Results
2021	Recall	No 73.5 – 26.5%
2020	President	Biden 70.3 - 25.7%
2018	Governor	Newsom 74.0 – 26.0%
2018	Senator	Feinstein 55.0 – 45.0%
2016	President	Clinton 74.6 – 19.8%
2016	Senator	Sanchez 50.3 – 49.7%
2014	Governor	Brown 69.8 – 30.2%
2012	President	Obama 73.7 – 23.7%
2012	Senator	Feinstein 74.4 – 25.6%

== List of assembly members representing the district ==
Due to redistricting, the 39th district has been moved around different parts of the state. The current iteration resulted from the 2021 redistricting by the California Citizens Redistricting Commission.

Assembly members	Party	Years served	Counties represented	Notes
Charles H. Ward	Republican	January 5, 1885 – January 3, 1887	San Francisco	
James E. Britt	Democratic	January 3, 1887 – January 7, 1889	San Francisco	
John H. McCarthy	Democratic	January 7, 1889 – January 5, 1891	San Francisco	
Charles S. Arms	Democratic	January 5, 1891 – January 2, 1893	San Francisco	
Julius Kahn	Republican	January 2, 1893 – January 7, 1895	San Francisco	
H. G. W. Dinkelspiel	Republican	January 7, 1895 – January 4, 1897	San Francisco	
Leon E. Jones	Republican	January 4, 1897 – January 2, 1899	San Francisco	
Justus S. Wardell	Democratic	January 2, 1899 – January 1, 1901	San Francisco	
Frank D. MacBeth	Republican	January 1, 1901 – January 5, 1903	San Francisco	
W. W. Allen Jr.	Republican	January 5, 1903 – January 2, 1905	San Francisco	
Thomas Atkinson	Republican	January 2, 1905 – January 7, 1907	San Francisco	
Charles Morris Fisher	Republican	January 7, 1907 – January 4, 1909	San Francisco	
Edward Joseph Callan	Republican	January 4, 1909 – January 2, 1911	San Francisco	
Walter T. Lyon	Democratic	January 2, 1911 – January 6, 1913	San Francisco	
George Fitzgerald	Republican	January 6, 1913 – January 4, 1915	Alameda	
Frank W. Anderson	Progressive	January 4, 1915 – January 5, 1925	Alameda	
Frank W. Anderson	Republican	January 4, 1915 – January 5, 1925	Alameda	
Michael J. McDonough	Republican	January 5, 1925 – January 5, 1931	Alameda	
Clifford Wixson	Republican	January 5, 1931 – January 2, 1933	Alameda	
George R. Bliss	Republican	January 2, 1933 – January 7, 1935	Santa Barbara	
Alfred W. Robertson	Democratic	January 7, 1935 – January 4, 1943	Santa Barbara	
Thomas H. Werdel	Republican	January 4, 1943 – January 6, 1947	Kern	
Wright Elwood James	Republican	January 6, 1947 – January 3, 1949	Kern	
Joe C. Lewis	Democratic	January 3, 1949 – January 8, 1951	Kern	
H. W. "Pat" Kelly	Republican	January 8, 1951 – January 5, 1959	Kern	
John C. Williamson	Democratic	January 5, 1959 – January 7, 1963	Kern	
George Deukmejian	Republican	January 7, 1963 – January 2, 1967	Los Angeles	
James A. Hayes	Republican	January 6, 1967 – August 31, 1972	Los Angeles	Resigned after Governor Reagan appointed him to be a member of the Los Angeles County Board of Supervisors.
Vacant		August 31, 1972 – January 8, 1973	Los Angeles	
Bill Bond	Republican	January 8, 1973 – November 30, 1974	Los Angeles	
Jim Keysor	Democratic	December 2, 1974 – November 30, 1978	Los Angeles	
J. Robert Hayes	Republican	December 4, 1978 – November 30, 1980	Los Angeles	
Richard Katz	Democratic	December 1, 1980 – November 30, 1996	Los Angeles	
Tony Cárdenas	Democratic	December 2, 1996 – November 30, 2002	Los Angeles	
Cindy Montañez	Democratic	December 2, 2002 – November 30, 2006	Los Angeles	
Richard Alarcon	Democratic	December 4, 2006 – March 16, 2007	Los Angeles	Resigned to become a member of the Los Angeles City Council.
Vacant		March 16, 2007 – May 25, 2007	Los Angeles	
Felipe Fuentes	Democratic	May 25, 2007 – November 30, 2012	Los Angeles	Sworn in after winning special election filling the seat Alarcon left vacant, after becoming a member of the Los Angeles City Council.
Raul Bocanegra	Democratic	December 3, 2012 – November 30, 2014	Los Angeles	
Patty López	Democratic	December 1, 2014 – November 30, 2016	Los Angeles	
Raul Bocanegra	Democratic	December 5, 2016 – November 27, 2017	Los Angeles	Resigned after sexual harassment allegations.
Vacant		November 27, 2017 – June 11, 2018	Los Angeles	
Luz Rivas	Democratic	June 11, 2018 – November 30, 2022	Los Angeles	Sworn in after winning special election.
Juan Carrillo	Democratic	December 5, 2022 – present	Los Angeles	

== Election results (1990–present) ==
=== 2024 ===
2024 California State Assembly 39th district election
Primary election
Party	Candidate	Votes	%
Democratic	Juan Carrillo Ventura (incumbent)	22,339	53.3
Republican	Paul Marsh	19,565	46.7
Total votes		41,904	100.0
General election
Democratic	Juan Carrillo Ventura (incumbent)	72,152	57.7
Republican	Paul Marsh	52,871	42.3
Total votes		125,023	100.0
Democratic hold			

=== 2022 ===
2022 California State Assembly 39th district election
Primary election
Party	Candidate	Votes	%
Republican	Paul Andre Marsh	13,572	38.1
Democratic	Juan Carrillo	10,706	30.0
Democratic	Andrea Rosenthal	7,746	21.7
Democratic	Steve G. Fox	3,615	10.1
Total votes		35,639	100.0
General election
Democratic	Juan Carrillo	37,531	57.0
Republican	Paul Andre Marsh	28,291	43.0
Total votes		65,822	100.0
Democratic hold			

=== 2020 ===
2020 California State Assembly 39th district election
Primary election
Party	Candidate	Votes	%
Democratic	Luz Rivas (incumbent)	54,512	77.8
Republican	Ricardo Benitez	15,590	22.2
Total votes		70,102	100.0
General election
Democratic	Luz Rivas (incumbent)	117,207	74.1
Republican	Ricardo Benitez	41,033	25.9
Total votes		158,240	100.0
Democratic hold			

=== 2018 ===
2018 California State Assembly 39th district election
Primary election
Party	Candidate	Votes	%
Democratic	Luz Rivas	20,453	43.9
Republican	Ricardo Antonio Benitez	11,679	25.1
Democratic	Patty López	6,783	14.6
Democratic	Antonio Sanchez	4,705	10.1
Democratic	Patrea Patrick	1,740	3.7
Democratic	Bonnie Corwin	1,220	2.6
Total votes		46,580	100.0
General election
Democratic	Luz Rivas (incumbent) (Note: Candidate was not an incumbent during the primary but was an incumbent in the general election after winning the special election for the seat. The special election was held on the same day as the primary.)	85,027	77.7
Republican	Ricardo Antonio Benitez	24,468	22.3
Total votes		109,495	100.0
Democratic hold			

=== 2018 (special) ===
2018 California State Assembly 39th district special election Vacancy resulting from the resignation of Raul Bocanegra
Primary election
Party	Candidate	Votes	%
Democratic	Luz Rivas	8,222	42.9
Republican	Ricardo Antonio Benitez	3,862	20.1
Democratic	Antonio Sanchez	3,802	19.8
Democratic	Patty López	1,907	9.9
Democratic	Yolie Anguiano	922	4.8
Democratic	Patrea Patrick	467	2.4
Total votes		19,182	100.0
General election
Democratic	Luz Rivas	31,851	70.8
Republican	Ricardo Antonio Benitez	13,165	29.2
Total votes		45,016	100.0
Democratic hold			

=== 2016 ===
2016 California State Assembly 39th district election
Primary election
Party	Candidate	Votes	%
Democratic	Raul Bocanegra	30,119	44.4
Democratic	Patty López (incumbent)	18,472	27.2
Democratic	Joel Fajardo	6,831	10.1
Democratic	Joanne Fernandez	4,538	6.7
Democratic	Mina Creswell	4,418	6.5
Democratic	Kevin James Suscavage	3,489	5.1
Total votes		67,867	100.0
General election
Democratic	Raul Bocanegra	74,834	60.1
Democratic	Patty López (incumbent)	49,649	39.9
Total votes		124,483	100.0
Democratic hold			

=== 2014 ===
2014 California State Assembly 39th district election
Primary election
Party	Candidate	Votes	%
Democratic	Raul Bocanegra (incumbent)	13,069	62.5
Democratic	Patty Lopez	4,940	23.6
Democratic	Kevin J. Suscavage	2,876	13.7
Republican	Michael B. Boyd (write-in)	36	0.2
Total votes		20,921	100.0
General election
Democratic	Patty Lopez	22,750	50.5
Democratic	Raul Bocanegra (incumbent)	22,284	49.5
Total votes		45,034	100.0
Democratic hold			

=== 2012 ===
2012 California State Assembly 39th district election
Primary election
Party	Candidate	Votes	%
Democratic	Raul Bocanegra	11,521	36.2
Democratic	Richard Alarcón	8,567	26.9
Republican	Ricardo A. Benitez	5,037	15.8
Republican	Omar Cuevas	2,596	8.2
Green	John Paul (Jack) Lindblad	2,421	7.6
Republican	Margie Margarita Carranza	1,697	5.3
Democratic	Kevin J. Suscavage (write-in)	2	0.0
Total votes		31,841	100.0
General election
Democratic	Raul Bocanegra	62,612	58.4
Democratic	Richard Alarcón	44,624	41.6
Total votes		107,236	100.0
Democratic hold			

=== 2010 ===
2010 California State Assembly 39th district election
Party	Candidate	Votes	%
Democratic	Felipe Fuentes (incumbent)	43,267	78.5
Green	John Paul (Jack) Lindblad	11,905	21.6
Total votes		55,172	100.0
Democratic hold			

=== 2008 ===
2008 California State Assembly 39th district election
Party	Candidate	Votes	%
Democratic	Felipe Fuentes (incumbent)	59,495	73.7
Republican	Grady Martine	14,689	18.2
Green	John Paul (Jack) Lindblad	6,505	8.1
Total votes		80,689	100.0
Democratic hold			

=== 2007 (special) ===
2007 California State Assembly 39th district special election Vacancy resulting from the resignation of Richard Alarcón
Party	Candidate	Votes	%
Democratic	Felipe Fuentes	5,819	50.8
Republican	Jose Bonilla, Sr.	2,277	19.9
Democratic	Felipe Siordia	1,457	12.7
Democratic	Eric Dwight Rothenay	1,300	11.4
Democratic	Margie Carranza	597	5.2
Total votes		11,450	100.0
Democratic hold			

=== 2006 ===
2006 California State Assembly 39th district election
Party	Candidate	Votes	%
Democratic	Richard Alarcón	40,603	100.0
Total votes		40,603	100.0
Democratic hold			

=== 2004 ===
2004 California State Assembly 39th district election
Party	Candidate	Votes	%
Democratic	Cindy Montanez (incumbent)	56,017	76.8
Republican	Ely De La Cruz Ayao	16,936	23.2
Total votes		72,953	100.0
Democratic hold			

=== 2002 ===
2002 California State Assembly 39th district election
Party	Candidate	Votes	%
Democratic	Cindy Montañez	36,449	76.1
Republican	Ely De La Cruz Ayao	11,449	23.9
Total votes		47,898	100.0
Democratic hold			

=== 2000 ===
2000 California State Assembly 39th district election
Party	Candidate	Votes	%
Democratic	Tony Cardenas (incumbent)	54,466	78.1
Republican	Enrique (Henry) Valdez	12,269	17.6
Libertarian	Christopher "Kit" Maira	3,020	4.3
Total votes		69,755	100.0
Democratic hold			

=== 1998 ===
1998 California State Assembly 39th district election
Party	Candidate	Votes	%
Democratic	Tony Cardenas (incumbent)	41,841	86.7
Libertarian	Christopher "Kit" Maira	6,423	13.3
Total votes		48,264	100.0
Democratic hold			

=== 1996 ===
1996 California State Assembly 39th district election
Party	Candidate	Votes	%
Democratic	Tony Cardenas	41,798	71.7
Libertarian	Ollie M. McCaulley	16,522	28.3
Total votes		58,320	100.0
Democratic hold			

=== 1994 ===
1994 California State Assembly 39th district election
Party	Candidate	Votes	%
Democratic	Richard Katz (incumbent)	34,976	70.6
Republican	Nicholas Fitzgerald	14,583	29.4
Total votes		49,559	100.0
Democratic hold			

=== 1992 ===
1992 California State Assembly 39th district election
Party	Candidate	Votes	%
Democratic	Richard Katz (incumbent)	45,387	69.4
Republican	Nicholas Fitzgerald	16,739	25.6
Libertarian	David H. George	3,270	5.0
Total votes		65,396	100.0
Democratic hold			

=== 1990 ===
1990 California State Assembly 39th district election
Party	Candidate	Votes	%
Democratic	Richard Katz (incumbent)	37,813	67.6
Republican	Sam Ceravolo	18,098	32.4
Total votes		55,911	100.0
Democratic hold			

== See also ==
- California State Assembly
- California State Assembly districts
- Districts in California
