= Luz Rivas =

American politician (born 1974)

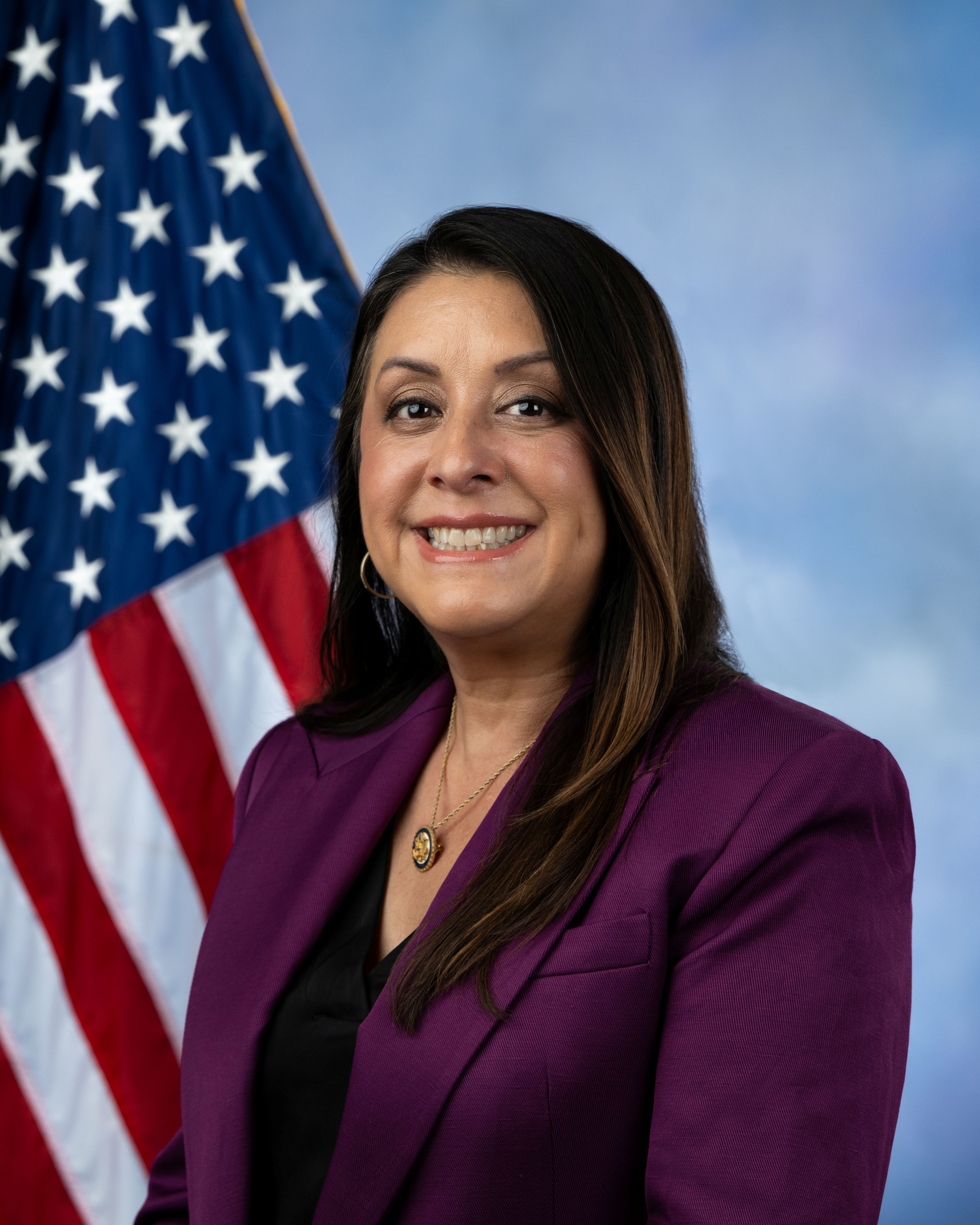
- Official portrait, 2025

Member of the U.S. House of Representatives from California's 29th district
- Incumbent
- Assumed office January 3, 2025
- Preceded by: Tony Cárdenas

Member of the California State Assembly
- In office June 11, 2018 – November 30, 2024
- Preceded by: Raul Bocanegra
- Succeeded by: Celeste Rodriguez
- Constituency: 39th district (2018–2022); 43rd district (2022–2024)

Personal details
- Born: Luz Maria Rivas; February 6, 1974 (age 52) Los Angeles, California, U.S.
- Party: Democratic
- Education: Massachusetts Institute of Technology (BS); Harvard University (MEd)
- Website: House website Campaign website

Luz Maria Rivas (born February 6, 1974) is an American politician who has served as the U.S. representative from California's 29th congressional district since 2025. A member of the Democratic Party, she previously represented the 43rd district in the California State Assembly from 2018 to 2024.

== Early life and education ==
Rivas was born and raised in Los Angeles. She earned a Bachelor of Science degree in electrical engineering from the Massachusetts Institute of Technology, worked for Motorola, and then earned a Master of Education degree from the Harvard Graduate School of Education. She founded a non-profit organization based in Pacoima, Los Angeles, to encourage school age girls to pursue careers in science, technology, engineering, and mathematics. She also served on Los Angeles' City Public Works Commission.

== California State Assembly ==
Following Raul Bocanegra's resignation from the California State Assembly, Rivas declared her candidacy in the special election to succeed him. Rivas won the special election on June 5, 2018, and was sworn into office on June 11.

Rivas is a member of the California Legislative Progressive Caucus.

=== Housing ===
Rivas has opposed legislative proposals that would reduce the stringent regulations on affordable housing construction along California's coast (which includes many of the state's most affluent and segregated areas). She has sought to limit the ability of religious institutions to build more housing. Rivas is a member of the California Legislative Progressive Caucus.

== U.S. House of Representatives ==
=== 2024 election ===
Tony Cárdenas, the incumbent U.S. Representative for California's 29th congressional district, announced that he would not run for reelection in the 2024 elections. Rivas announced her candidacy for the seat, with Cárdenas's endorsement. She won the election.

=== Tenure ===
Before the start of the 119th Congress, Rivas was elected as the freshman class representative for the Democratic Caucus, defeating Maryland freshman U.S. Representative-elect Sarah Elfreth and Washington freshman U.S. Representative-elect Emily Randall.

=== Committee assignments ===
- Committee on Natural Resources
  - Subcommittee on Energy and Mineral Resources
  - Subcommittee on Water, Wildlife and Fisheries
- Committee on Science, Space, and Technology
  - Subcommittee on Investigations and Oversight
  - Subcommittee on Research and Technology

=== Caucus membership ===
- Congressional Hispanic Caucus
- Congressional Progressive Caucus
- Congressional Equality Caucus

== Personal life ==
Rivas is Catholic. Rivas was the founder of DIY Girls, which is a non-profit organization that supports girls who are interested in learning technology and engineering through mentorship and education.

== Electoral history ==
California Assembly special election, 2018: District 39
Primary election
Party	Candidate	Votes	%
Democratic	Luz Rivas	8,222	42.86
Republican	Ricardo Benitez	3,862	20.13
Democratic	Antonio Sanchez	3,802	19.82
Democratic	Patty López	1,907	9.94
Democratic	Yolie Anguiano	922	4.81
Democratic	Patrea Patrick	467	2.43
Total votes		19,182	100
General election
Democratic	Luz Rivas	31,851	70.75
Republican	Ricardo Benitez	13,165	29.25
Total votes		45,016	100
Democratic hold			

California Assembly election, 2018: District 39
Primary election
Party	Candidate	Votes	%
Democratic	Luz Rivas	20,453	43.91
Republican	Ricardo Benitez	11,679	25.07
Democratic	Patty López	6,783	14.56
Democratic	Antonio Sanchez	4,705	10.10
Democratic	Patrea Patrick	1,740	3.74
Democratic	Bonnie Corwin	1,220	2.62
Total votes		46,580	100
General election
Democratic	Luz Rivas (incumbent)	85,027	77.65
Republican	Ricardo Benitez	24,468	22.35
Total votes		109,495	100
Democratic hold			

California Assembly election, 2020: District 39
Party	Candidate	Votes	%
Democratic	Luz Rivas (incumbent)	117,207	74.07
Republican	Ricardo Benitez	41,033	25.93
Total votes		158,240	100
Democratic hold			

California Assembly election, 2022: District 43
Party	Candidate	Votes	%
Democratic	Luz Rivas (incumbent)	55,282	74.64
Republican	Siaka Massaquoi	18,782	25.36
Total votes		74,064	100
Democratic hold			

US House election, 2024: California District 29
Primary election
Party	Candidate	Votes	%
Democratic	Luz Rivas	40,096	49.27
Republican	Benito Bernal	21,446	26.35
Democratic	Angélica María Dueñas	19,844	24.38
Total votes		81,386	100
General election
Democratic	Luz Rivas	146,312	69.78
Republican	Benito Bernal	63,374	30.32
Total votes		209,686	100
Democratic hold			

US House election, 2026: California District 29
Primary election
Party	Candidate	Votes	%
Democratic	Luz Rivas (incumbent)	62,385	51.04
Democratic	Angélica María Dueñas	30,469	24.93
Republican	Rudy Melendez	29,362	24.02
Total votes		122,216	100
Democratic hold			

== See also ==
- List of Hispanic and Latino Americans in the United States Congress

U.S. House of Representatives
Preceded by Tony Cárdenas	Member of the U.S. House of Representatives from California's 29th congressional district 2025–present	Incumbent
U.S. order of precedence (ceremonial)
Preceded by Josh Riley	United States representatives by seniority 414th	Succeeded by Derek Schmidt
