= Felipe Fuentes =

American lobbyist and former politician

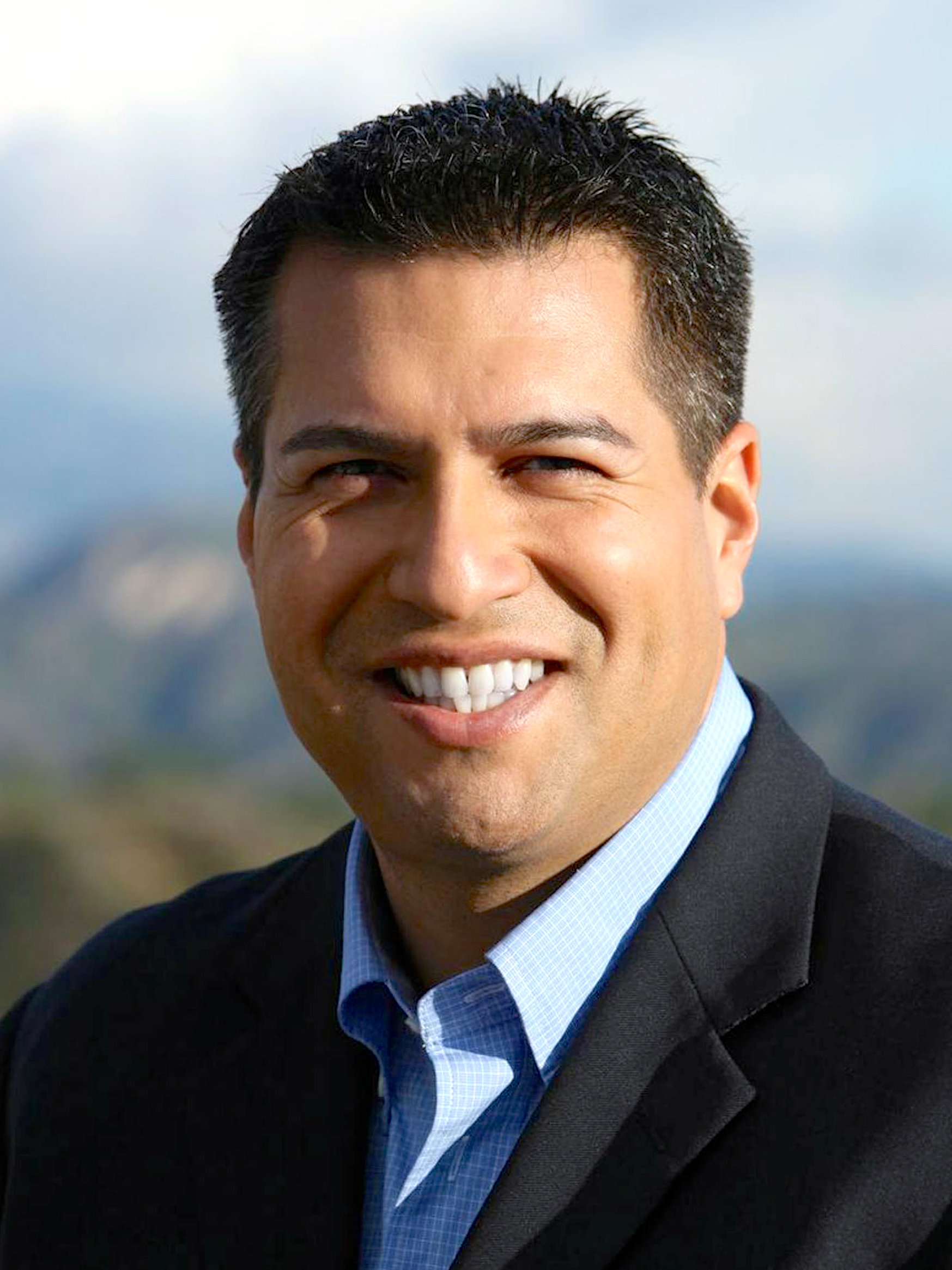
- Official portrait, 2013

Member of the Los Angeles City Council from the 7th district
- In office July 1, 2013 – September 11, 2016
- Preceded by: Richard Alarcon
- Succeeded by: Monica Rodriguez

Member of the California State Assembly from the 39th district
- In office May 25, 2007 – November 30, 2012
- Preceded by: Richard Alarcon
- Succeeded by: Raul Bocanegra

Personal details
- Born: Felipe J. Fuentes III; May 25, 1971 (age 55) Colorado Springs, Colorado, U.S.
- Party: Democratic
- Spouse: Lena Wu Fuentes
- Children: 1
- Education: Pepperdine University; University of California, Los Angeles
- Profession: Lobbyist; politician; businessman

Felipe J. Fuentes III (born May 25, 1971) is an American lobbyist, former politician, and businessman who served as a member of the Los Angeles City Council for the 7th district from 2013 until his resignation in 2016. Prior to serving on the Los Angeles City Council, Felipe Fuentes was a member of the California State Assembly, representing the 39th district from 2007 until 2010.

Starting his political career as a staffer for then-Councilmember Alex Padilla, Fuentes initially attempted a run for Padilla's city council seat in 2007. However, he withdrew in favor of Richard Alarcon, who won the seat. That same year, Fuentes was elected to Alarcon's vacated seat in the State Assembly. After being termed out of the Assembly, he successfully ran for City Council in 2013. Despite his win, Fuentes served only a partial term, resigning in 2016 to become a lobbyist.

== Early life and education ==
Fuentes was born on May 25, 1971 in Colorado Springs, Colorado. The grandson of Mexican immigrants, he attended San Fernando High School, from which he graduated. He later earned a degree from the University of California, Los Angeles and at the Pepperdine Graziadio Business School at Pepperdine University.

== Early politics and State Assembly ==
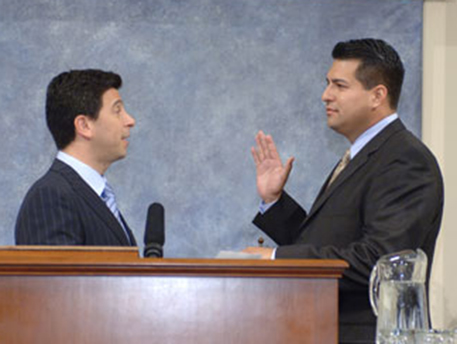
Fuentes being sworn in by Fabian Núñez, 2007.

He started becoming involved in politics in 1999, working as an aide to Los Angeles City Council member Alex Padilla and serving as the liaison for Mayor of Los Angeles James Hahn. After Padilla announced his resignation to be in the California State Assembly, Fuentes announced that he would be running for his seat. By December 2006, however, Fuentes announced that he would be quitting the race after Richard Alarcon, who had previously represented the district from 1993 to 1999, launched his campaign. However, because of Alarcon's win in the special election, a vacancy was created, and Fuentes quickly emerged as the leading candidate to fill the position. In the special election, he was supported by Alarcon and won the seat.

During his first term, Fuentes introduced a significant number of bills advocated by lobbyists, in which The Mercury News described it as "one of the highest totals" for any legislator in a session. In 2011, while serving in the State Assembly, he was dubbed the "Worst Legislator in California" by LA Weekly, describing him as a poor legislator after an investigative report revealed that nearly half of the bills he introduced during his first term were ghostwritten by lobbyists or special interest groups. After he termed out, Fuentes was succeeded by Raul Bocanegra, who later resigned during his second term in 2017 following sexual harassment allegations that stemmed from his time as a staffer for Fuentes. Although he had termed out, he managed to stay on the payroll by working for Bocanegra until he was sworn in as a councilmember seven months later.

== Los Angeles City Council ==
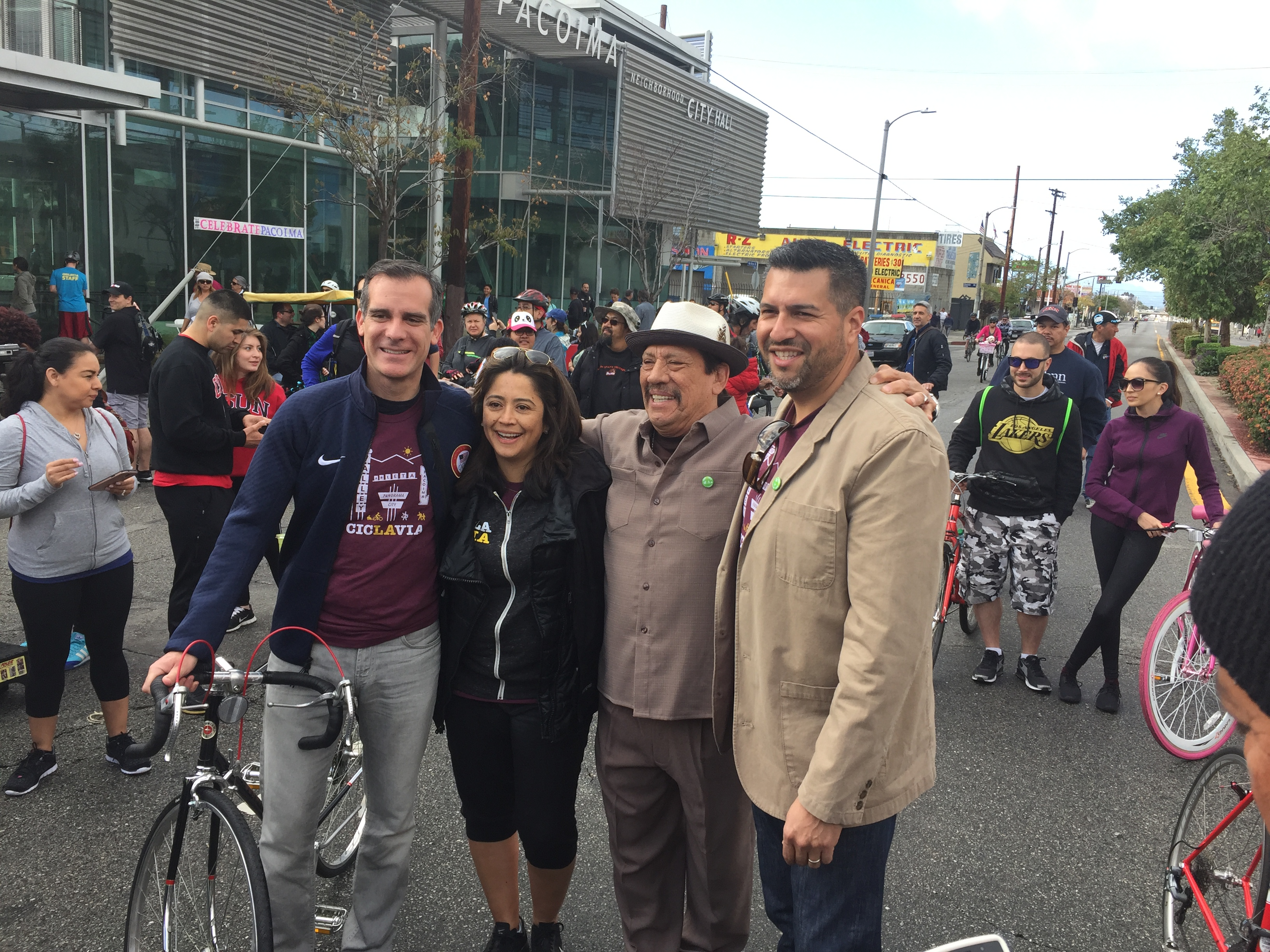
Fuentes with Eric Garcetti, Barbara Romero, and Danny Trejo at CicLAvia 2016.

In 2013, Alarcon had served a single term on the Los Angeles City Council, which made him term-limited. Felipe Fuentes then ran for the City Council seat again and won. During his time in office, Fuentes fought with neighborhood councils on development projects and proposed routes for a high-speed rail plan. He also introduced a measure aimed at making the Los Angeles Department of Water and Power more efficient and played a role in vetting a city plan to increase the minimum wage over the next five years.

In January 2016, he announced that he would not run for a second term nor for any other office. On August 14, 2016, Fuentes announced that he would be resigning from his council seat the following month to become a lobbyist for the Apex Group representing the Associated General Contractors of California. He officially resigned on September 11, 2016, and his seat was temporarily filled by Council President Herb Wesson of the 10th district. In the next election, he was succeeded by Monica Rodriguez, who ran against Alarcon in 2007 and considered running in 2013 against Fuentes.

== Personal life ==
Fuentes is married to Lena Wu, and they have one daughter named Iliana Flor Fuentes. They reside in Sylmar, Los Angeles.

== Electoral history ==
Electoral history of Felipe Fuentes
| Year | Office | | Party | Primary | | | General | | | Result | Swing | Ref. |
| Year | Office | | Party | Total | % | P. | Total | % | P. | Result | Swing | Ref. |
|---|---|---|---|---|---|---|---|---|---|---|---|---|
| 2007 | California State Assembly | 39th | Democratic | 5,819 | 50.82% | 1st | Runoff cancelled | | | Won | Hold | |
| 2008 | California State Assembly | 39th | Democratic | 6,527 | 74.17% | 1st | 59,495 | 73.73% | 1st | Won | Hold | |
| 2010 | California State Assembly | 39th | Democratic | 7,828 | 100.00% | 1st | 43,267 | 78.42% | 1st | Won | Hold | |
| 2013 | Los Angeles City Council | 7th | Nonpartisan | 9,912 | 51.38% | 1st | Runoff cancelled | | | Won | N/A | |

| Preceded by Richard Alarcon | Los Angeles City Councilmember, 7th district July 1, 2013 – September 11, 2016 | Succeeded by Monica Rodriguez |
