= We Said Enough =

Nonprofit organization in California against sexual harassment

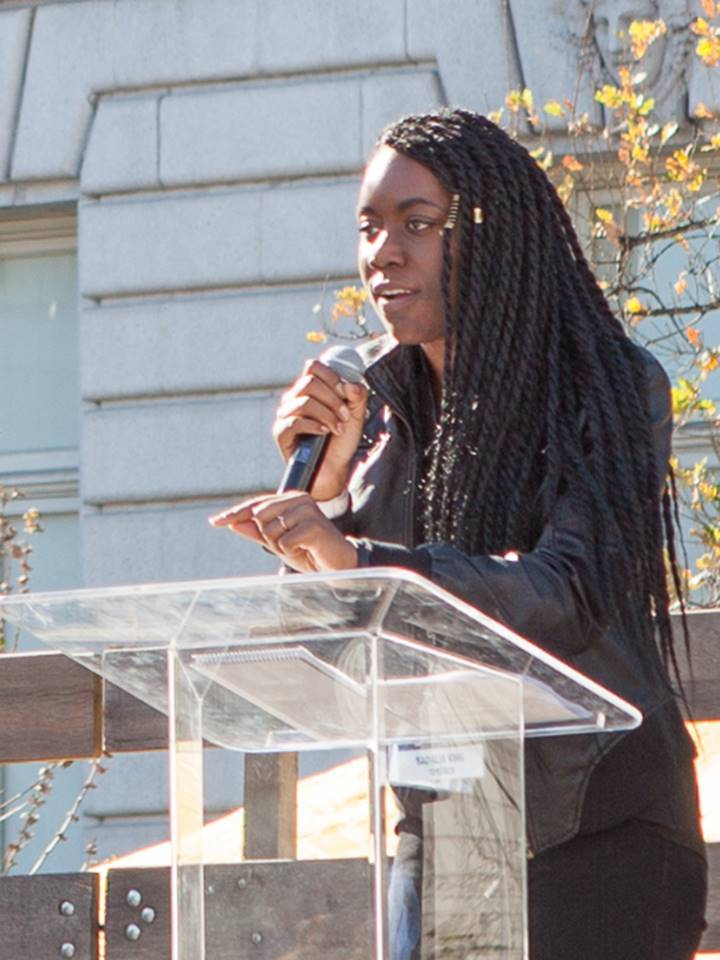
Sadalia King of We Said Enough speaks at the 2018 Women's March San Francisco

We Said Enough or WeSaidEnough is a nonprofit organization that was founded in 2017. It is dedicated to eliminating discrimination, sexual harassment and assault within employment and academic settings. We Said Enough is based in Sacramento, California.

== About ==
In 2017 California lobbyist, Adama Iwu had been in a conversation about sexual harassment and violence with friends who worked in California politics, all of whom had "Me Too" stories to share. Iwu herself had been sexually harassed in front of people at a political event where no one called out the behavior.

Iwu approached her close colleague Samantha Corbin to help pen a bipartisan letter that was published on October 17, 2017 alongside an article in the Los Angeles Times. with over 140 signatories.

The letter was signed by California Capitol staff, legislators, lobbyists, and political consultants. It brought attention to the culture of sexual harassment they faced at work. The We Said Enough letter became the first open statement by women working in politics calling out a pervasive culture of harassment and abuse within a capitol community. During the initial launch of its letter, We Said Enough organizers released a series of stories that victims and survivors of harassment and sexual violence had submitted to the We Said Enough website.

We Said Enough has stated it wants to increase protections for victims and improve due process in order to hold those who harass others in the workplace accountable.

We Said Enough has outlined several reforms to make the California Capitol a safer place to work. This includes asking for a confidential hotline for victims to report abuse and "whistleblower" protections for Capitol employees.

Additionally, We Said Enough has also been asking questions about how the process of investigating sexual harassment are conducted. The group wants an "independent publicly accountable entity to handle investigations for both legislative houses" in the California State Legislature.

== California Assembly Hearings ==
Following the We Said Enough letter and subsequent movement, the California State Assembly convened the first hearing of its newly formed Subcommittee on Harassment, Discrimination, and Retaliation Prevention and Response. We Said Enough Leaders Christine Pelosi, Samantha Corbin, and Alicia Lewis testified on behalf of the organization.

== Time Person of the Year: The Silence Breakers ==
Due to the significant news coverage and attention brought forward by the We Said Enough movement, Adama Iwu was featured on the cover of Time Magazine for its Person of the Year: "The Silence Breakers". Also pictured was strawberry picker Isabel Pascual (pseudonym), actress Ashley Judd, software engineer Susan Fowler, singer-songwriter Taylor Swift, and a sixth woman, a hospital worker who wished to remain anonymous

== Reach and impact ==
The We Said Enough campaign was involved with Assemblyman Raul Bocanegra resigning when allegations of sexual harassment came forward in November. State Senator Tony Mendoza had to step down from his committee chair and came under investigation because of allegations of workplace misconduct. Assemblyman Matt Dababneh resigned after women came forward with allegations of sexual misconduct.

The We Said Enough website collects stories from women across the country.

== Backlash ==
Some women have been shamed for talking about their experiences with sexual harassment and violence in California politics. One lobbyist who signed onto the letter was fired from her job immediately after she notified her employer that she had signed it.

== See also ==
- Me Too (hashtag)
