= Tony Cárdenas =

American politician (born 1963)

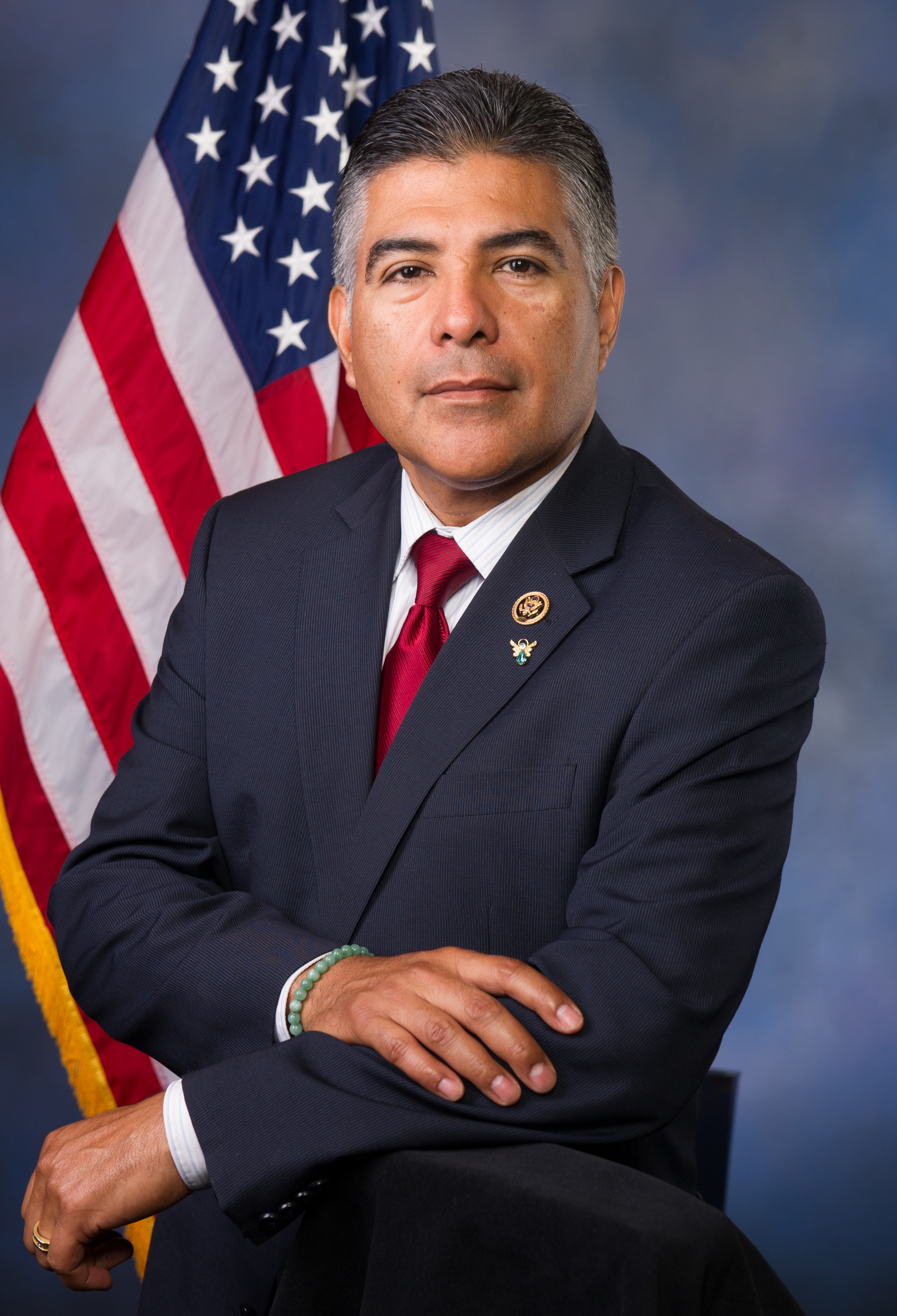
- Official portrait, 2015

Member of the U.S. House of Representatives from California's 29th district
- In office January 3, 2013 – January 3, 2025
- Preceded by: Adam Schiff (redistricted)
- Succeeded by: Luz Rivas

Member of the Los Angeles City Council from the 6th district
- In office July 1, 2003 – January 3, 2013
- Preceded by: Ruth Galanter
- Succeeded by: Nury Martinez

Member of the California State Assembly from the 39th district
- In office December 2, 1996 – November 30, 2002
- Preceded by: Richard Katz
- Succeeded by: Cindy Montañez

Personal details
- Born: Antonio Cárdenas; March 31, 1963 (age 63) Los Angeles, California, U.S.
- Party: Democratic
- Spouse: Norma Rodriguez
- Children: 4
- Education: University of California, Santa Barbara (BS)
- Cárdenas's voice Cárdenas honors Cesar Chavez. Recorded March 30, 2022

Antonio Cárdenas (/ˈkɑːrdəˌnɑːs/ KAR-də-NAHSS; born March 31, 1963) is an American politician who served as the United States representative for California's 29th congressional district from 2013 to 2025.

A member of the Democratic Party, Cárdenas was previously a member of the Los Angeles City Council, representing the Sixth Council District, which covers parts of the northeast San Fernando Valley, including Arleta, Pacoima, Sun Valley, North Hollywood, Panorama City, Van Nuys, and Lake Balboa.

Cárdenas was elected to the California State Assembly for three consecutive terms and chaired the budget committee. He was elected to the Los Angeles City Council in 2003 and reelected in 2007 and 2011. Cárdenas was elected to Congress in 2012 and was re-elected five times. He did not seek re-election in 2024.

== Early life and education ==
Cárdenas was born on March 31, 1963, in Pacoima, Los Angeles. He is one of 11 children of Andrés Cárdenas and María Quezada, who immigrated to the United States shortly after marrying in Jalisco, Mexico, in 1946. Andrés Cárdenas was a farm worker near Stockton, California, before the family relocated to Pacoima in 1954.

Cárdenas graduated from San Fernando High School in the northeast San Fernando Valley. In 1986, he earned a Bachelor of Science degree in electrical engineering from the University of California, Santa Barbara.

== Political career ==
=== California State Assembly ===
==== Elections ====
In 1996, Cárdenas ran for California's 39th State Assembly district after Democratic incumbent Richard Katz decided not to run for reelection. He defeated Republican Ollie McCaulley 72%-28%. In 1998, he was reelected with 87% of the vote. In 2000, he was reelected to a third term with 78% of the vote.

==== Tenure ====
Cárdenas's state reforms brought 78,000 new classroom seats and 15 playgrounds throughout Los Angeles. He also secured more than $650 million for new school construction. He authored legislation that reformed California's gang prevention and intervention programs and teamed up with fellow Democrat Adam Schiff to create the Schiff-Cárdenas Juvenile Justice Crime Prevention Act.

==== Committee assignments ====
- Energy and Commerce

=== Los Angeles City Council ===
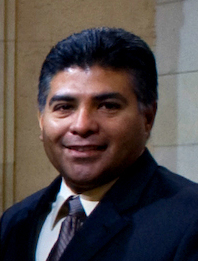
Cárdenas as a member of the Los Angeles City Council in 2008.

==== Elections ====
In 2002, Cárdenas ran for the Los Angeles City Council's 2nd district. Wendy Greuel defeated him 50.4%-49.6%, a difference of 225 votes. In 2003, he ran for the City Council's 6th district. He defeated Jose Roy Garcia 69%-31%. In 2007, he was reelected with 66% of the vote. In 2011, he was reelected to a third term with 58% of the vote. He left this role in 2013.

==== Tenure ====
Cárdenas is an animal rights activist. He authored legislation that created Los Angeles's first Animal Cruelty Task Force, which arrests animal abusers. He supported the city's mandatory spay/neuter ordinance to reduce the number of stray and homeless animals.

Cárdenas strongly supported green energy. He proposed the Renewable Energy Portfolio Standard that established goals for the city's Department of Water and Power to obtain at least 20% of its energy from wind and solar. He also proposed a plan that would convert all of the city's taxis to be fuel-efficient by 2015.

As chair of the city's Ad Hoc Committee on Gang Violence and Youth Development, Cárdenas identified millions of dollars overlooked by the city to help keep kids off the streets and reduce crime while reducing expenditures on crime abatement programs. As vice chair of the city's Public Safety Committee, he spearheaded the country's most comprehensive gang intervention model. The Community-Based Gang Intervention Model standardized and defined the methods used by gang intervention workers to help stop violence in some of Los Angeles's most dangerous neighborhoods.

In 2012, Cárdenas passed amendments to the city's daytime curfew ordinance. The new policy eliminated fines of up to $500 that students were facing. It also reduced court visits for parents and students and allowed students to do community service to eliminate citations.

==== Committee assignments ====
- Business Tax Reform (chair)
- Energy and Natural Resources (chair)
- Gang Violence and Youth Development (chair)
- Budget and Finance
- Housing, Community, and Economic Development

=== U.S. House of Representatives ===
==== Committee assignments ====
For the 118th Congress:

- Committee on Energy and Commerce
  - Subcommittee on Communications and Technology
  - Subcommittee on Energy, Climate, and Grid Security
  - Subcommittee on Health

==== Caucus memberships ====
- New Democrat Coalition
- American Sikh Congressional Caucus
- House Baltic Caucus
- Congressional Arts Caucus
- Congressional Hispanic Caucus
- Congressional Coalition on Adoption
- Rare Disease Caucus

==== Elections ====
In 2012, Cárdenas ran for the newly redrawn California's 29th congressional district after redistricting. He ranked first in the June open primary with 64% of the vote. Independent David Hernandez, president of the San Fernando Chamber of Commerce, ranked second with 22% of the vote, qualifying for the November election. Richard Valdez ranked third with 14% of the vote. In the November general election, Cárdenas defeated Hernandez, 74%-26%.

==== Tenure ====
As of October 2021, Cárdenas had voted in line with Joe Biden's stated position 100% of the time.

On November 20, 2023, it was reported that Cárdenas would not run for re-election in 2024.

=== Political positions ===
==== Abortion ====
Cárdenas opposed the overturning of Roe v. Wade, calling it an "all out assault on autonomy".

==== Big Tech ====
In 2022, Cárdenas was one of 16 Democrats to vote against the Merger Filing Fee Modernization Act of 2022, an antitrust package that would crack down on corporations for anti-competitive behavior.

==== Israel-Palestine ====
Cardenas voted to provide Israel with support following the October 7 attacks.

== Lobbying (PACS) ==
Cardenas received $31,050 from AIPAC Associated individuals. Other contributors were The Society for Vascular Surgery, AT&T Inc, Committee for Hispanic Causes-BOLD PAC, and Abbott Laboratories, excluding AIPAC, the total from contributors was $24,659.

== Personal life ==
Chicano literature author Luis J. Rodriguez is Cárdenas's brother-in-law.

On May 3, 2018, Cárdenas identified himself as the subject of a lawsuit filed in Los Angeles County alleging sexual abuse of a minor in 2007. The lawsuit alleged that a (then unnamed) local politician drugged a 16-year-old girl at the Hillcrest Country Club in Los Angeles and then sexually molested her while driving her to the emergency room after she passed out, though there has been no evidence to link him to such accusations. Cárdenas issued a statement in response to the charges, calling them "100%, categorically untrue".

On July 3, 2019, Angela Chavez, the woman who made the accusations against Cárdenas, dropped the lawsuit. It was also noted that her father, Gus Villela, approached Richard Alarcon, who ran against Cárdenas in 2016, offering to spread negative information about Cárdenas in exchange for a job with Alarcon's congressional campaign. Alarcon said he declined to hire Villela and reported the meeting to the FBI. The case was settled as a resolution, not a settlement, with prejudice, meaning that the lawsuit cannot be refiled.

== See also ==
- List of Hispanic and Latino Americans in the United States Congress

U.S. House of Representatives
Preceded by Adam Schiff	Member of the U.S. House of Representatives from California's 29th congressional district 2013–2025	Succeeded by Luz Rivas
U.S. order of precedence (ceremonial)
Preceded by Brian Bilbray as Former U.S. Representative	Order of precedence of the United States as Former U.S. Representative	Succeeded by Eric Swalwell as Former U.S. Representative
