= Cindy Montañez =

American politician (1974–2023)

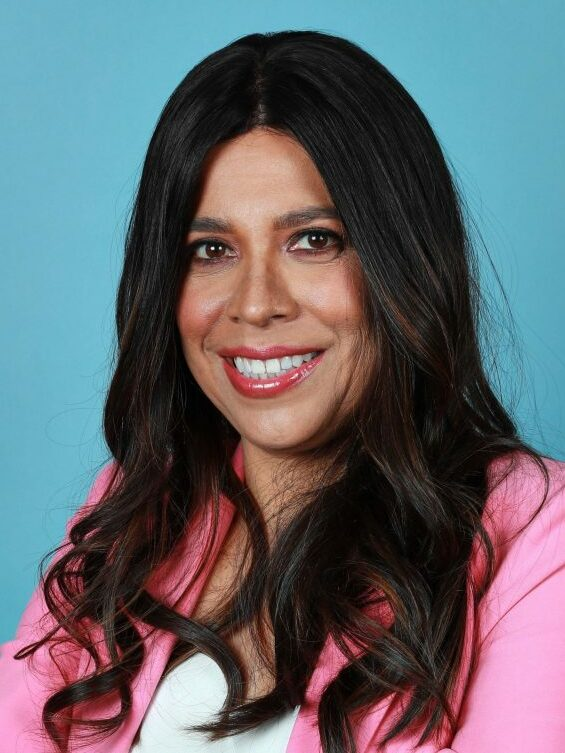
- Montañez c. 2020–2022

Member of the California State Assembly from the 39th district
- In office December 2, 2002 – November 30, 2006
- Preceded by: Tony Cárdenas
- Succeeded by: Richard Alarcon

Member of the San Fernando City Council from the at-large district
- In office December 7, 2020 – October 21, 2023
- Preceded by: Robert C. Gonzales
- Succeeded by: Vacant
- In office 1999 – November 30, 2002

Mayor of San Fernando
- In office April 2001 – November 30, 2002

Personal details
- Born: January 19, 1974 San Fernando, California, U.S.
- Died: October 21, 2023 (aged 49) San Fernando, California, U.S.
- Party: Democratic
- Education: University of California, Los Angeles

Cindy Montañez (January 19, 1974 – October 21, 2023) was an American Democratic politician who was an Assemblywoman from California's 39th State Assembly district, serving for four years, from 2002 until 2006.

== Early life ==
Montañez was born on January 19, 1974, in San Fernando, California, and raised in San Fernando along with her five siblings by parents who were immigrants from Mexico.

== Student activist ==
Montañez attended the University of California, Los Angeles. In the Spring of 1993 she was one of five students to join a hunger strike in protest against UCLA Chancellor Charles E. Young's decision not to create a Chicano Studies program on campus. She collapsed on the fourth day of the strike, requiring medical attention. The hunger strike ended after 14 days with the creation of the César E. Chávez Center for Interdisciplinary Instruction in Chicana and Chicano Studies at UCLA. The center later became known as the César E. Chávez Department of Chicana and Chicano Studies.

== Political career ==
=== San Fernando city council ===
In 1999 Montañez was elected to the San Fernando city council, and in 2001 she and her older sister, Maribel de la Torre, made history as two sisters concurrently serving on the same city council when de la Torre won a seat. Montañez resigned from the San Fernando City Council in late 2002 when she won a seat in the California State Assembly, and de la Torre was recalled in 2012 amid a sex scandal.

In 2020 she returned to the San Fernando city council, after winning an election. She served on the San Fernando city council until her death in October 2023.

=== Assembly tenure ===
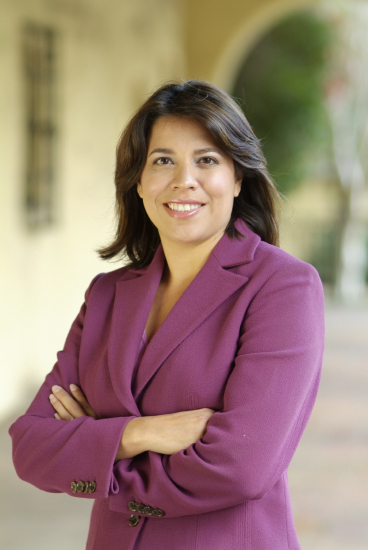
Cindy Montañez during her tenure in the California State Assembly

Montañez was elected to the State Assembly in 2002 and re-elected in 2004. In February 2004, Montañez was named the chairperson of the Assembly Rules Committee. At 30 years old, she was the youngest person to ever chair the powerful committee as well as the first Latina and the first Democratic woman to chair the committee.

Her legislative work focused on issues that were vital to her district. Specific focuses included education, the environment, health care and consumer/worker protection. During her first term, ten of her bills made it out of the legislature and were signed into law. These bills included statutes to improve the management of urban landfills, a law to protect children from a sexually abusive parent and laws to insure the safety of workers. Montanez was the author of the landmark "Car Buyer's Bill of Rights".

=== State Senate ===
In 2006 Montañez stepped down from the Assembly to run for the 20th district state Senate seat. However, she lost that primary to Los Angeles City Councilman Alex Padilla.

=== Los Angeles City Council races ===
Montañez was a candidate in a 2013 special election for the 6th District seat on the Los Angeles City Council, which comprises the neighborhoods of Lake Balboa, Van Nuys, Panorama City, Arleta, Sun Valley and segments of North Hills and North Hollywood. The seat became vacant when Tony Cárdenas was elected to the United States House of Representatives. She lost the run-off election on July 23, 2013 to Nury Martinez by a 45%-55% margin. Martinez had served as Montañez's campaign manager when Montañez first ran for the State Assembly in 2002.

Montañez tried to challenge Martinez in a rematch for the full term on March 3, 2015. Montañez lost the election by a margin of 39% to 61%.

== Other ventures ==
After leaving the Assembly in 2006, Montañez was appointed to the California Unemployment Insurance Appeals Board and the Los Angeles Department of Water and Power. On July 1, 2014, she resigned from her position as an Assistant General Manager for the Los Angeles Department of Water and Power to run for the Los Angeles City Council.

In March 2016 Montañez was chosen to be the CEO of the environmental advocacy organization TreePeople, which is located in Los Angeles at Coldwater Canyon City Park in the eastern Santa Monica Mountains. She remained in that position until her death. Montañez also served as a board member for the UCLA Institute of the Environment and Sustainability as well as a Legislator In-Residence at the USC Jesse M. Unruh Institute of Politics

On January 22, 2020, Cindy was elected as a founding board member of Latinos LEAD. Patrick Salazar, the organization's founder, stated that her unparalleled network and visionary support for the Latinos LEAD concept were crucial to the organization’s successful launch.

== Illness and death ==
On August 31, 2023, Montañez announced that she had been diagnosed with late-stage cancer. She died at her home in San Fernando on October 21, at the age of 49.

== Legacy ==
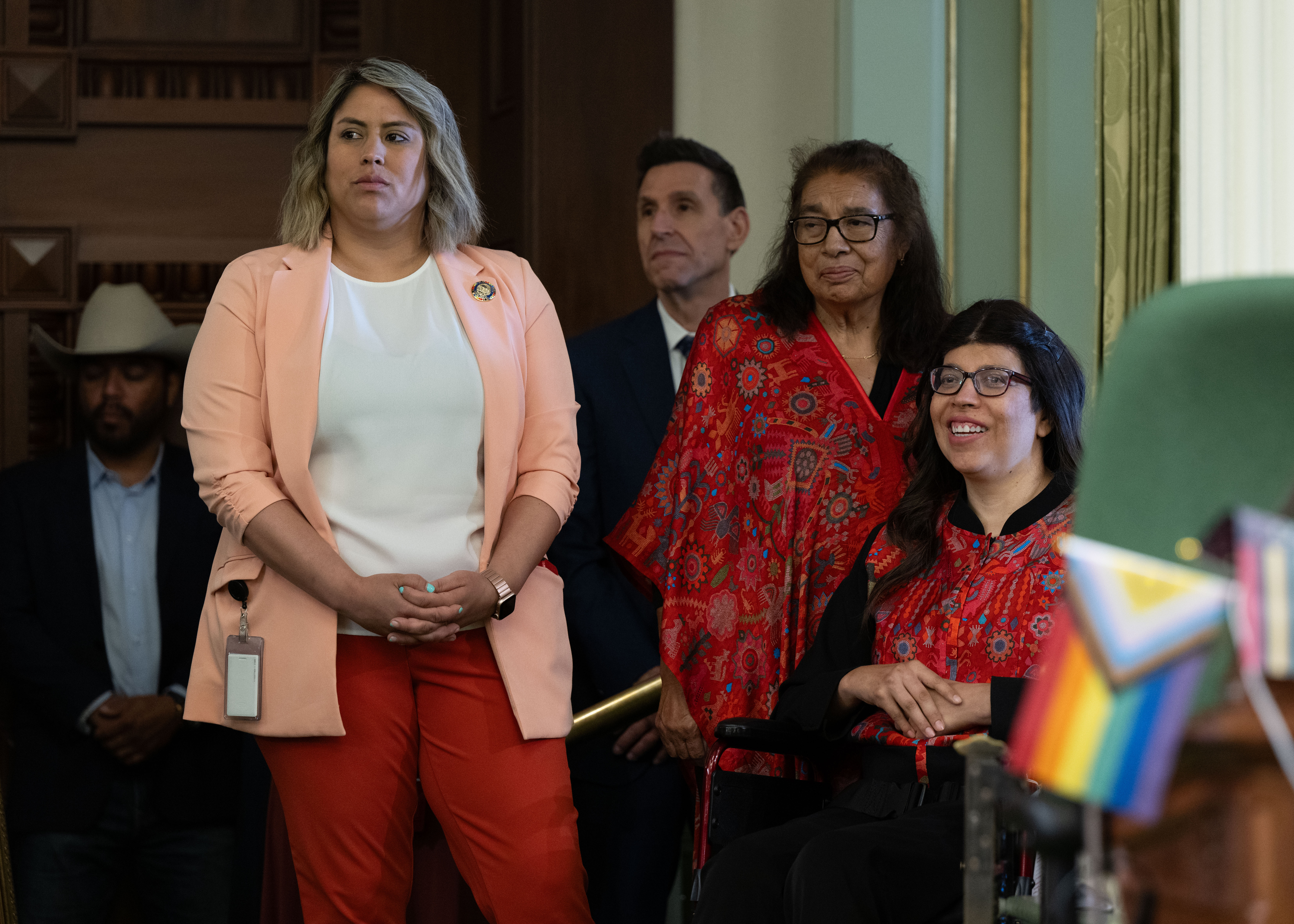
Montañez (right) and her family, along with Caroline Menjivar (left) listen to the declaration of Cindy Montañez Day, August 28, 2023.

On August 28, 2023, the California State Assembly passed a resolution that declared January 19 as Cindy Montañez Day, with the Los Angeles City Council unanimously renaming Pacoima Wash Natural Park to Cindy Montañez Natural Park a day later.

In October 2023, shortly before her death, the Los Angeles Board of Education voted to rename an elementary school in her honor. The school's new name is Gridley-Montañez Dual Language Academy.

California Assembly
Preceded by Tony Cárdenas	Member of the California State Assembly from the 39th district 2002–2006	Succeeded by Richard Alarcon
Preceded by	Chair of the California State Assembly Rules Committee; 2004–2006	Succeeded by Hector De La Torre
