= Raul Bocanegra =

American politician

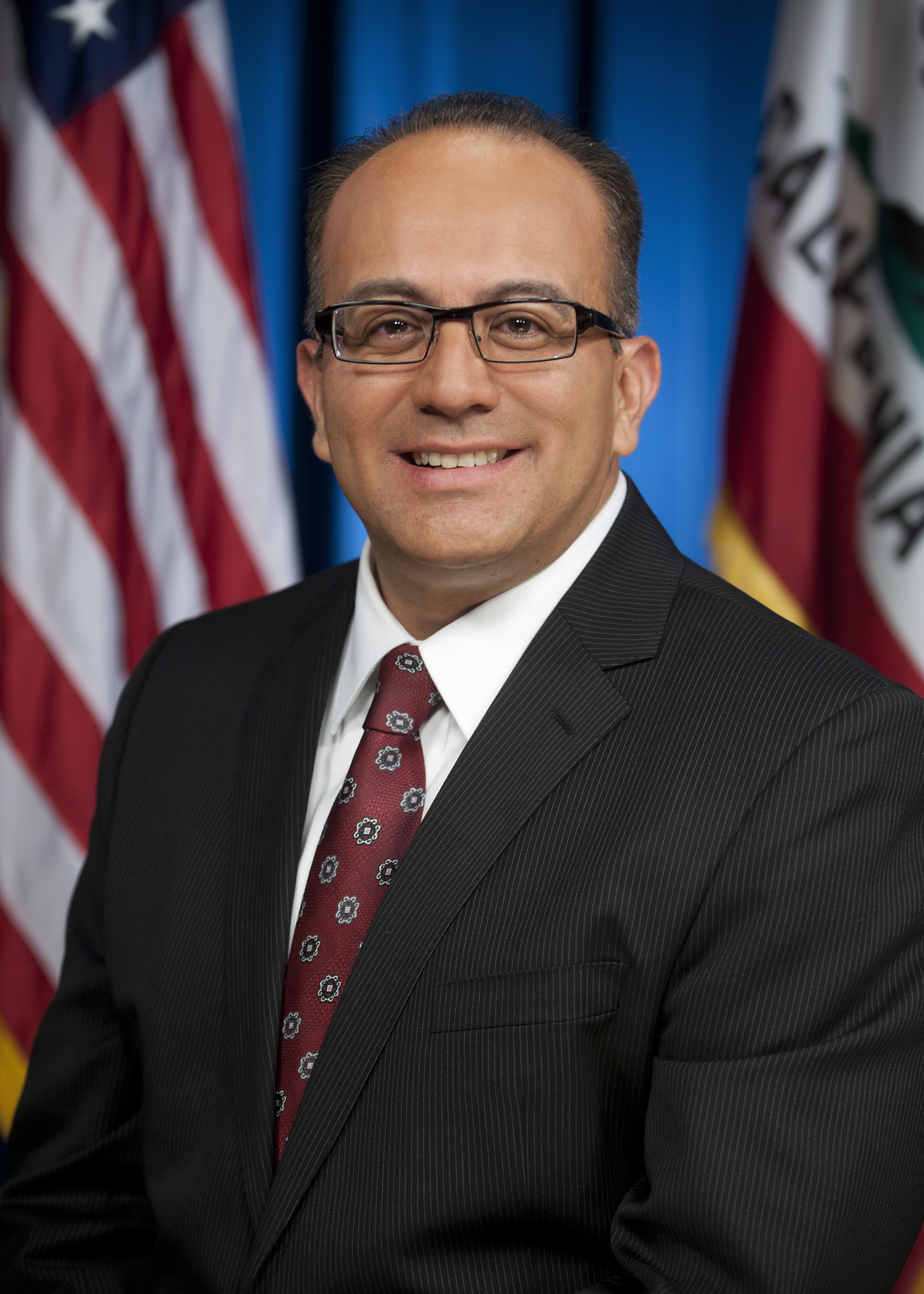

Member of the California State Assembly from the 39th district
- In office December 5, 2016 – November 27, 2017
- Preceded by: Patty López
- Succeeded by: Luz Rivas
- In office December 3, 2012 – November 30, 2014
- Preceded by: Felipe Fuentes
- Succeeded by: Patty López

Personal details
- Born: July 13, 1971 (age 55) Los Angeles, California, U.S.
- Party: Democratic
- Education: University of California, Los Angeles (Bachelors and Masters)
- Occupation: Legislative staffer, college professor

Raul Justo Bocanegra (born July 13, 1971) is an American politician, and a former member of the California State Assembly. He is a Democrat who represented the 39th Assembly District, encompassing northeastern San Fernando Valley.

Bocanegra was first elected to the assembly in 2012, but was narrowly defeated in his 2014 bid for reelection by political outsider and fellow Democrat Patty Lopez. He reclaimed his previous assembly seat after defeating Lopez in 2016. Before being elected to the assembly, he was an urban planner and chief of staff to his predecessor Felipe Fuentes. A native of the San Fernando Valley, he graduated from San Fernando High School.

On November 27, 2017, Bocanegra announced he would resign, effective immediately, as a result of sexual harassment allegations.

== 2009 groping incident ==
In 2009, Bocanegra worked as a staff member for then assembly member Felipe Fuentes.

In October 2017, Elise Flynn Gyore, who worked as a staffer for a state senator at the time, alleged that Bocanegra "put his hands into her blouse" outside of a bathroom at a night club in Sacramento. Flynn Gyore did not know Bocanegra at the time. The next day, she reported the incident to the Senate sergeant who conducted an investigation which concluded that it was "more likely than not that Mr. Bocanegra engaged in [that] behavior that night". In October 2017, Flynn Gyore made her allegation public.

The revelation of the incident prompted the California Legislative Women's Caucus to call upon the legislature to review the incident and "immediately enforce, for once, the bodies’ zero-tolerance policies." An editorial in the Los Angeles Daily News called for Bocanegra's resignation and condemned those who knew about the groping yet helped him rise in his career. The group, We Said Enough, called on him to resign. Local activists, including former assembly member Patty López, who defeated Bocanegra in 2014 and lost to him in 2016, demonstrated outside Bocanegra's district office. Los Angeles Unified School District Board Member Kelly Gonez issued a statement saying "It’s not enough to admonish a staffer or legislator to stay away from his victim," and commending Gyore for speaking out.

== Elections ==
=== 2014 ===
California's 39th State Assembly district election, 2014
Primary election
Party	Candidate	Votes	%
Democratic	Raul Bocanegra (incumbent)	13,069	62.5
Democratic	Patty Lopez	4,940	23.6
Democratic	Kevin J. Suscavage	2,876	13.7
Republican	Michael B. Boyd (write-in candidate)	36	0.2
Total votes		20,921	100.0
General election
Democratic	Patty Lopez	22,750	50.5
Democratic	Raul Bocanegra (incumbent)	22,284	49.5
Total votes		45,034	100.0
Democratic hold			

=== 2016 ===
California's 39th State Assembly district election, 2016
Primary election
Party	Candidate	Votes	%
Democratic	Raul Bocanegra	30,119	44.4
Democratic	Patty López (incumbent)	18,472	27.2
Democratic	Joel Fajardo	6,831	10.1
Democratic	Joanne Fernandez	4,538	6.7
Democratic	Mina Creswell	4,418	6.5
Democratic	Kevin James Suscavage	3,489	5.1
Total votes		67,867	100.0
General election
Democratic	Raul Bocanegra	74,834	60.12
Democratic	Patty López (incumbent)	49,649	39.88
Total votes		124,483	100.0
Democratic hold			
