= Patty López =

American politician (born 1968)

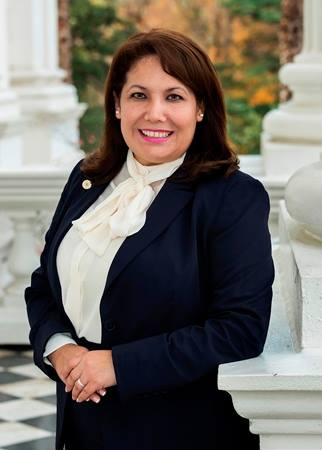
- Official portrait, 2014

Member of the San Fernando City Council
- Incumbent
- Assumed office December 11, 2024
- Preceded by: Celeste Rodriguez

Member of the California State Assembly from the 39th district
- In office December 1, 2014 – November 30, 2016
- Preceded by: Raul Bocanegra
- Succeeded by: Raul Bocanegra

Personal details
- Born: January 15, 1968 (age 58) Michoacán, Mexico
- Party: Democratic
- Spouse: Juan (m. 1986)
- Children: 4
- Occupation: Politician

Patty López (born January 15, 1968) is a Mexican-American politician and member of the San Fernando, California city council. She was a former member of the California State Assembly, representing the 39th district, encompassing parts of the San Fernando Valley. She is a Democrat. Prior to being elected to the Assembly, she was a community representative for the North Valley Occupational Center-Aviation Center. After serving in the Assembly, she ran for a seat on the Los Angeles Unified School District Board of Education, but did not make the run-off election.

== Personal life ==
She arrived in the United States at the age of 12 from Michoacán, Mexico, speaking no English. Her parents did not enroll her in public school. Ultimately, she taught herself how to read and write in English and re-enrolled in adult night school at the age of 18 in order to earn her high school diploma. Having worked since the age of 14, she held various jobs as a housekeeper, children's nanny, fast food worker, factory worker, and educational advocate. Her experience of having to seek out education as an adult instilled a lifelong interest in public education for her. She helped found the Padres Activos of the San Fernando Valley, an organization dedicated to helping immigrant parents secure their children's academic rights in public school.

== Career ==
=== 2014 California State Assembly ===
In 2014, López ran for office for the first time and was elected to the California State Assembly, narrowly defeating the incumbent in an upset. While in the Assembly, López authored several pieces of legislation that have been successfully enacted into law. Her most important piece of legislation was the Right to Dry bill, which prohibits apartment complexes and multiple family residential dwellings from banning individuals who wish to dry their clothing on a clothes line. She also authored legislation to require an independent film maker to sit as a board member on California's Filming Commission. She notably authored a bill to make prosecutorial misconduct a felony offense. Although she was accused of being a secret Republican, Patty López earned a perfect score from the Courage Campaign in their review of her 2015 voting record. She also has led activist rallies in her community in defense of the rights of undocumented immigrants and the rights of transgender individuals.

López has also been known to occasionally give remarks on the State Assembly floor in Spanish, which is her first language. She was one of five Democrats in the State Assembly to vote against the mandatory vaccination bill, SB 277. Additionally, she was a strong proponent of the minimum wage increase to $15 an hour in California, reflecting on the Assembly floor about her own experience as a minimum wage earner.

In 2016, she was honored by the National Women's Political Caucus as the recipient of their annual Leadership award. She was also given the annual Green Leadership Award in 2016.

After her unexpected win, opponents immediately accused her of numerous campaign finance violations, although she was ultimately exonerated of all allegations with the exception of one minor infraction. The accusations included allegations of money laundering, purposefully hiding donors, and secretly arranging independent expenditures to benefit her. Ultimately, after a year-long investigation by the California Fair Political Practices Commission, López was found guilty of only one campaign finance violation: spending approximately $800 in cash raised from selling homemade pupusas and tamales without first depositing the cash into her campaign's bank account.

California's 39th State Assembly district election, 2014
Primary election
| Party | Candidate | Votes | % |
|---|---|---|---|
| Democratic | Raul Bocanegra (incumbent) | 13,069 | 62.5 |
| Democratic | Patty López | 4,940 | 23.6 |
| Democratic | Kevin J. Suscavage | 2,876 | 13.7 |
| Republican | Michael B. Boyd (write-in) | 36 | 0.2 |
| Total votes | | 20,921 | 100.0 |
General election
| Democratic | Patty Lopez | 22,750 | 50.5 |
| Democratic | Raul Bocanegra (incumbent) | 22,284 | 49.5 |
| Total votes | | 45,034 | 100.0 |
| Democratic hold | | | |

=== 2016 California State Assembly ===
She ran for reelection in 2016 and was successful in once again making the top two runoff in June 2016.

López had the endorsement of the California League of Conservation Voters, SEIU United Healthcare Workers West, the California Teachers Association, SEIU State Service Employees Council, SEIU Local 2015, SEIU Local 99, United Teachers of Los Angeles, the California Nurses Association, Consumer Attorneys of California, the Sierra Club, the National Women's Political Caucus, Democrats for Israel, the Faculty Association of California Community Colleges, the Chicano Latino Immigrant Democratic Club of Los Angeles, the Alliance of Californians for Community Empowerment, the California Democratic Legislative Women’s Caucus, and the California Legislative Latino Caucus. She also earned the endorsement of the Los Angeles Daily News.

California's 39th State Assembly district election, 2016
Primary election
| Party | Candidate | Votes | % |
|---|---|---|---|
| Democratic | Raul Bocanegra | 30,119 | 44.4 |
| Democratic | Patty López (incumbent) | 18,472 | 27.2 |
| Democratic | Joel Fajardo | 6,831 | 10.1 |
| Democratic | Joanne Fernandez | 4,538 | 6.7 |
| Democratic | Mina Creswell | 4,418 | 6.5 |
| Democratic | Kevin James Suscavage | 3,489 | 5.1 |
| Total votes | | 67,867 | 100.0 |
General election
| Democratic | Raul Bocanegra | 74,834 | 60.1 |
| Democratic | Patty López (incumbent) | 49,649 | 39.9 |
| Total votes | | 124,483 | 100.0 |
| Democratic hold | | | |

=== 2017 Los Angeles Unified School District Board of Education ===
A week after losing her Assembly seat, the Los Angeles Times reported that López had filed papers to run for an open seat representing Los Angeles Unified School District 6 after incumbent Mónica Ratliff vacated the seat to run for Los Angeles City Council District 7. While López did not report any campaign financing or expenditures, relying on donated signs and volunteers, the California Charter School Association Advocates Independent Expenditure Committee reported spending $89,255.57 in mailings opposing her candidacy, claiming that during her Assembly tenure she voted "with conservatives in Sacramento." López lost the election by finishing in third place behind Kelly Gonez and Imelda Padilla.

=== San Fernando City Council ===
In 2024, she re-entered politics by running for San Fernando City Council. She placed second out of five candidates with 22% of the vote, winning one of the two seats available, and was sworn in December 2024.
