= California Cycleway =

Bike path in Southern California

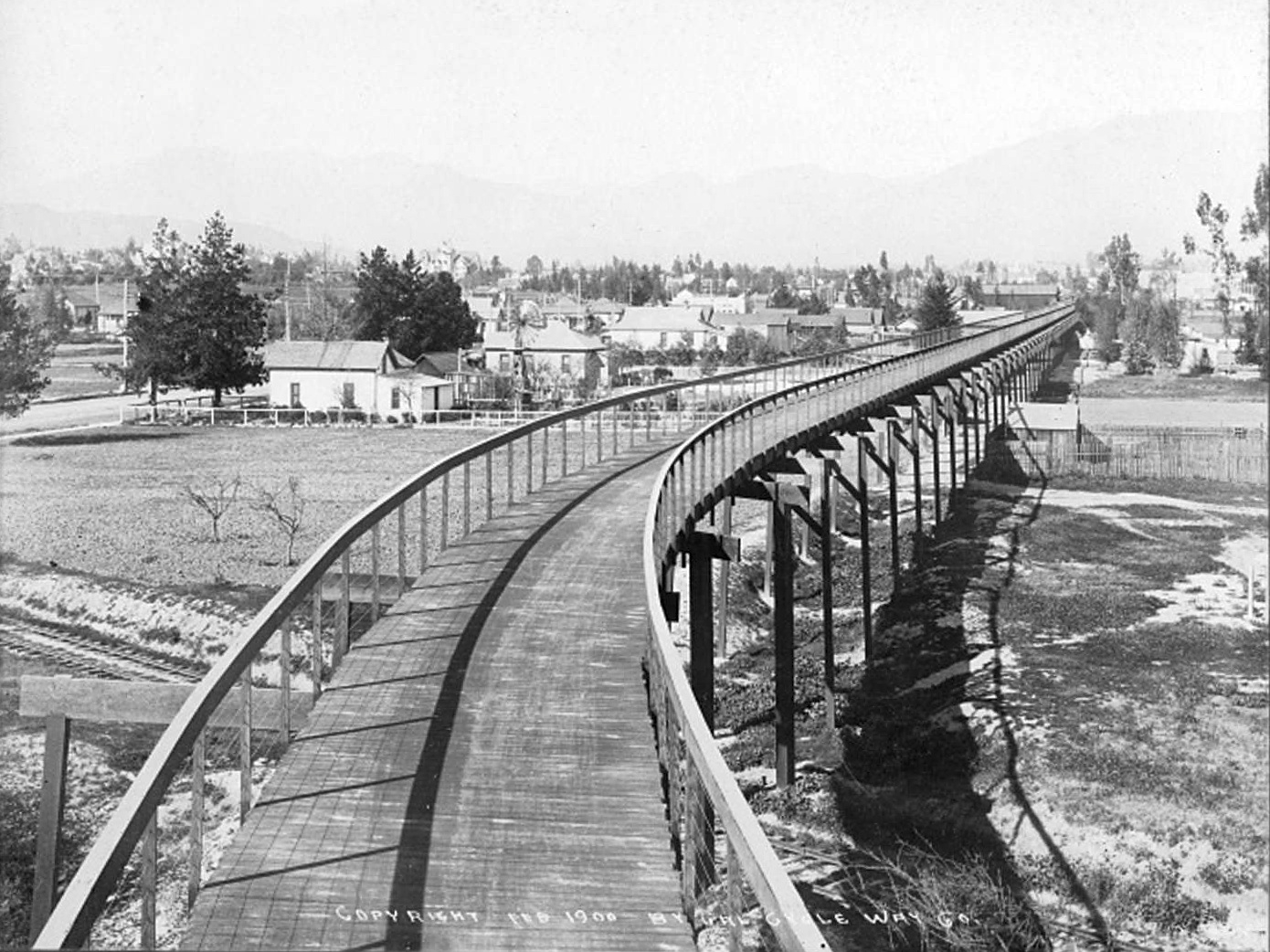
The California Cycleway, 1900

The California Cycleway, opened in 1900, was an approximately 1.3-mile (2.1 km) elevated tollway built specially for bicycle traffic mostly through Pasadena, connecting the Hotel Green in Pasadena with the Raymond Hotel in South Pasadena. The cycleway was intended to connect the cities of Pasadena, South Pasadena, and Los Angeles along the Arroyo Seco in California, United States along a nine-mile (14 km) route; however, it was never fully completed.

== Construction ==
The inventor and promoter of the cycleway was Pasadena resident Horace Dobbins, who attracted ex-California governor Henry Harrison Markham to join him in the venture. Together, the two sought approval from the California State Legislature, which was ultimately granted (after a first attempt was vetoed) in 1897. The California Cycleway Company bought a six-mile (10 km) right-of-way from downtown Pasadena to Avenue 54 in Highland Park, Los Angeles.

The bark Letitia from Puget Sound was the first boat to arrive at San Pedro laden with the first cargo of lumber for the cycleway in late September 1899. Another cargo of lumber arrived on October 15. A third installment of 460,000 feet of lumber arrived at the port in late October. The company obtained a vacant lot near the railroad and put in a siding at Glenarm street to store the lumber. On November 4, a carload of nails arrived at the site for construction of the cycleway. By November 7, 1899, a force of 15 men began work, placing the first concrete piers of the cycleway at Glenarm street near Raymond Hill. The 820,000 feet of lumber was unloaded for construction starting in November 8; a steam sawmill was purchased as well and was set up in Glenarm street within following week. A portable derrick helped build the path at a rate of about 300 feet a day. By the end of November, about half a mile of frame was completed. In early December the whole frame was nearly complete and workers began to lay the floor and on December 9, the railing was being put up. As construction progressed "little snags (between workers and neighboring property owners) [were] encountered now and then, but they [were] overcome."

The first approximately 1.3 miles (2.1 km) of the elevated wooden bikeway, starting at Pasadena's Hotel Green and ending near the site of the first Raymond Hotel, now the area of Raymond Hill, were opened to the public on January 1, 1900, at 8:30 a. m. The first patrons to go down the cycleway were reverend Otis Bedell along with a party of 12 other cyclists. The Los Angeles Herald reported that during the day nearly 1,000 people rode on the path and estimated that 1,500 trips were made without accident or complaint. By October 1900, construction of the Cycleway ceased due to a lack of usage, with Hobbins reporting, "I have concluded that we are a little ahead of time on this cycleway. Wheelmen have not evidenced enough interest in it and so we will lie still for a time and use it for an automobile service. But those vehicles are not yet common or perfect enough to jump into business." The Cycleway closed soon afterwards.

The majority of the completed portion of the route is now Edmondson Alley. A toll booth was located near the north end, in the present Central Park. Had the full route been completed, it would have continued past Highland Park, on through Montecito Heights, crossed the Los Angeles River, passed Elysian Park, and continued to the Plaza in Los Angeles. The full nine-mile run would have had a maximum grade of 3% and an average grade slightly over 1%. At its highest point, the elevation of the roadway was 50 feet (15 m).

The portion built was constructed almost entirely of Oregon pine and was wide enough for four cyclists to ride abreast, with provision for eventual doubling of the width. It was painted dark green and, at night, brightly lit with incandescent lights. The toll was 10 cents one-way, or 15 cents round trip.

The California Cycleway

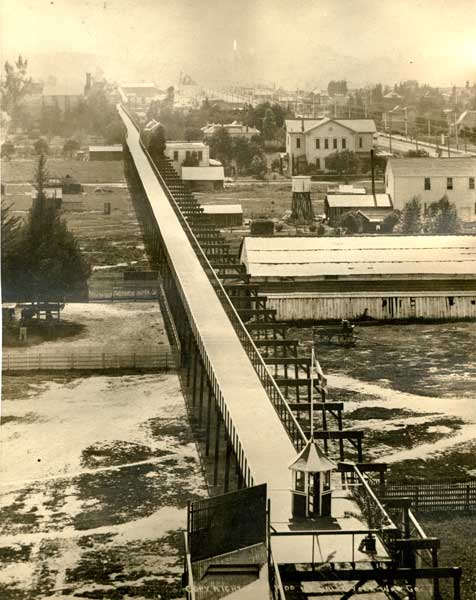
Looking south from Hotel Green, 1900

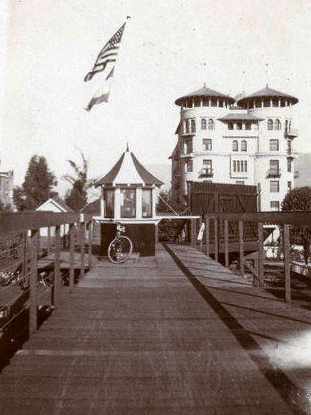
Looking north towards Hotel Green, 1904

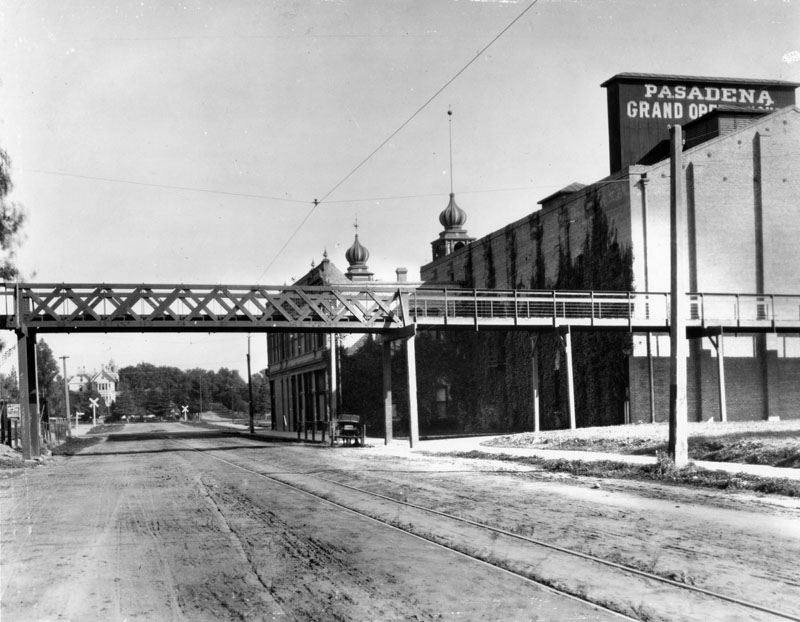
At the Grand Opera House

== Dismantling ==
Due to the end of the bicycle craze of the 1890s and the existing Pacific Electric Railway lines connecting Pasadena to Los Angeles, the cycleway never made a profit, and never extended beyond the Raymond Hotel into the Arroyo Seco. In the first decade of the 20th century, the structure was dismantled, and the wood sold for lumber, and the Pasadena Rapid Transit Company, a failed venture headed by Dobbins to construct a streetcar line, acquired the right-of-way. Later, a small portion of the California Cycleway's unbuilt right-of-way in South Pasadena became part of the Arroyo Seco Parkway (Pasadena Freeway).

== See also ==
- Arroyo Seco Parkway
- West Los Angeles Veloway
- Santa Monica Cycle Path
- San Rafael Hills
- List of Los Angeles Historic-Cultural Monuments on the East and Northeast Sides
