= Grand marshals of the Rose Parade =

Pasadena, California parade officials

Below is a list of grand marshals of the Rose Parade. This is an honorary position selected by the president of the Pasadena Tournament of Roses Association. Many marshals are picked for a relationship to the theme that is also picked by the president. Traditionally, the grand marshal of the Rose Parade also participates in the coin toss during the Rose Bowl Game.

== History ==
The 2022 Rose Parade and Rose Bowl game was led by grand marshal LeVar Burton, while 2023's event was led by former congresswoman Gabrielle Giffords.

2020 featured three grand marshals: legendary Oscar, Emmy, Grammy and Tony Award-winning actress and singer Rita Moreno, Olympic gymnast Laurie Hernández & Firefly star Gina Torres. However, the next year no Rose Parade was held due to the ongoing COVID pandemic. It marked the first time such a thing happened in 130 years.

Ten-time Grammy Award winner Chaka Khan was chosen by Tournament of Roses Association president Gerald Freeny as the grand marshal for the 2019 Rose Parade and Rose Bowl Game.

Actor and humanitarian Gary Sinise was chosen as the 2018 Tournament of Roses grand marshal by its president Lance Tibbet on October 30, 2017. Sinise is known for playing the role of Lt. Dan Taylor in Forrest Gump.

The Disney family is the only family to have more than one member serve as grand marshal: Walt Disney was the 1966 grand marshal, then his nephew Roy E. Disney held the post in 2000. Additionally, Mickey Mouse was the grand marshal for the 2005 parade. A number of years have featured multiple grand marshals, with the most in one parade being 1952, when seven Medal of Honor recipients were the grand marshals. Dr. Francis F. Rowland has been the grand marshal more than any other person – a total of seven times, in 1890, 1892, 1894, 1904, 1905, 1910 (this year sharing this duty with Prof. Charles F. Holder), and 1916. Former child actress Shirley Temple Black holds the runner-up position, having been grand marshal three times in 1939, 1989 and 1999, the latter year where she shared this honor with astronaut Buzz Aldrin, baseball player Jackie Robinson (who was also the first ever posthumous grand marshal) and film producer David L. Wolper.

On May 9, 2014, Louis Zamperini was selected as the grand marshal for the 2015 Tournament of Roses Parade, though he died of pneumonia two months later, and six months before the parade was set to begin. Rather than select a new grand marshal, the tournament announced that it was "committed to honoring him as the Grand Marshal of the 2015 Rose Parade," making him the first posthumous grand marshal since Jackie Robinson in 1999. At the parade, the formal honour was given to his son Luke Zamperini (with his wife Lisa and son Clay) and daughter Cynthia Garris (with her husband Mike).

On November 3, 2016, the 2017 grand marshals were revealed to be three Olympic athletes: Greg Louganis, Janet Evans and Allyson Felix. The Olympians were deliberately chosen to reflect on Los Angeles' bid for the 2024 Summer Olympics. This was the first year with multiple grand marshals since 2003, when Bill Cosby, Art Linkletter and Fred Rogers all shared this duty.

== 1890s ==
- 1890 – Dr. Francis F. Rowland
- 1891 – NONE
- 1892 – Dr. Francis F. Rowland
- 1893 – no grand marshal
- 1894 – Dr. Francis F. Rowland
- 1895 – Dr. Henry H. Sherk
- 1896 & 1897 – Edwin Stearns
- 1898 & 1899 – Martin H. Weight

== 1900s ==
- 1900 & 1901 – Charles Daggett
- 1902 & 1903 – C. C. Reynolds
- 1904 & 1905 – Francis F. Rowland
- 1906 – John B. Miller
- 1907 & 1908 – Dr. Ralph Skillen
- 1909 – Walter S. Wright

== 1910s ==
- 1910 – Dr. Francis F. Rowland & Prof. Charles F. Holder
- 1911 – Dr. Ralph Skillen
- 1912 – E. H. Groenendyke
- 1913 – Leigh Guyer
- 1914 – Charles Daggett
- 1915 – M. S. Pashgian
- 1916 – Dr. Francis F. Rowland
- 1917 – Dr. C. D. Lockwood
- 1918 – Dr. Z. T. Malaby
- 1919 – Frank Hunter

== 1920s ==
- 1920 – Frank G. Hogan
- 1921 – W. A. Boucher
- 1922 – Harold Landreth
- 1923 – H.L. Gianetti
- 1924 – Col. George S. Parker
- 1925 – Lewis H. Turner
- 1926 – Col. L. J. Mygatt
- 1927 – Dr. C.D. Lockwood
- 1928 – John McDonald
- 1929 – Marco Hellman

== 1930s ==
- 1930 – James Rolph
- 1931 – Gen. Charles S. Farnsworth
- 1932 – William May Garland
- 1933 – Mary Pickford
- 1934 – Adm. William Sims
- 1935 – Harold Lloyd
- 1936 – James V. Allred
- 1937 – Eugene Biscailuz
- 1938 – Leo Carrillo
- 1939 – Shirley Temple

== 1940s ==
- 1940 – Edgar Bergen & Charlie McCarthy
- 1941 – E. O. Nay
- 1942 – Kay Kyser
- 1943 – Governor-elect Earl Warren
- 1944 – Amos Alonzo Stagg
- 1945 – Former president Herbert Hoover
- 1946 – Adm. William Halsey
- 1947 – Bob Hope
- 1948 – Gen. Omar Bradley
- 1949 – Perry Brown

== 1950s ==
- 1950 – Paul G. Hoffman
- 1951 – Corporal Robert S. Gray (for General Dwight D. Eisenhower)
- 1952 – Medal of Honor Men: Major Carl Sitter, Captain Lewis Millett, Lieutenant Stanley Adams, Lieutenant Thomas Hudner, Captain Raymond Harvey, Sergeant Ernest Kouma & Sergeant Joseph C. Rodriguez
- 1953 – Senator and Vice President-elect Richard M. Nixon
- 1954 – General William F. Dean
- 1955 – Chief Justice Earl Warren
- 1956 – Charles E. Wilson
- 1957 – Eddie Rickenbacker
- 1958 – Robert Gordon Sproul
- 1959 – E. L. "Bob" Bartlett

== 1960s ==
- 1960 – Vice President Richard M. Nixon
- 1961 – William F. Quinn
- 1962 – Albert D. Rosellini
- 1963 – Dr. William H. Pickering
- 1964 – Former president Dwight D. Eisenhower
- 1965 – Arnold Palmer
- 1966 – Walt Disney
- 1967 – Thanat Khoman
- 1968 – Senator Everett Dirksen
- 1969 – Bob Hope

== 1970s ==
- 1970 – Apollo 12 Astronauts: Alan L. Bean, Charles Conrad Jr. & Richard F. Gordon Jr.
- 1971 – Reverend Billy Graham
- 1972 – Lawrence Welk
- 1973 – John Wayne
- 1974 – Charles M. Schulz
- 1975 – Hank Aaron
- 1976 – Kate Smith
- 1977 – Roy Rogers & Dale Evans
- 1978 – Former president Gerald Ford
- 1979 – Lathrop K. Leishman

== 1980s ==
- 1980 – Frank Sinatra
- 1981 – Lorne Greene
- 1982 – James Stewart
- 1983 – Merlin Olsen
- 1984 – Danny Kaye
- 1985 – Lee A. Iacocca
- 1986 – Erma Bombeck
- 1987 – Pelé
- 1988 – Gregory Peck
- 1989 – Shirley Temple Black

== 1990s ==
- 1990 – Senator John Glenn
- 1991 – Bob Newhart
- 1992 – The Most Excellent Cristóbal Colón de Carvajal y Gorosábel, 18th Duke of Veragua (descendant of Christopher Columbus) & Congressman Ben Nighthorse Campbell
- 1993 – Angela Lansbury
- 1994 – William Shatner
- 1995 – Juan "Chi-Chi" Rodríguez
- 1996 – Kermit the Frog
- 1997 – Carl Lewis & Shannon Miller
- 1998 – Carol Burnett
- 1999 – Buzz Aldrin, Shirley Temple Black, Jackie Robinson (posthumous) & David L. Wolper

== 2000s ==
- 2000 – Roy E. Disney
- 2001 – Tom Brokaw
- 2002 – Regis Philbin
- 2003 – Bill Cosby, Art Linkletter & Fred Rogers
- 2004 – John Williams
- 2005 – Mickey Mouse
- 2006 – Justice Sandra Day O'Connor
- 2007 – George Lucas
- 2008 – Emeril Lagasse
- 2009 – Cloris Leachman

== 2010s ==
- 2010 – Chesley B. "Sully" Sullenberger III
- 2011 – Paula Deen
- 2012 – J. R. Martinez
- 2013 – Jane Goodall
- 2014 – Vin Scully
- 2015 – Louis Zamperini (represented by his family after his death)
- 2016 – Ken Burns
- 2017 – Greg Louganis, Janet Evans and Allyson Felix
- 2018 – Gary Sinise
- 2019 – Chaka Khan

== 2020s ==
- 2020 – Laurie Hernández, Rita Moreno and Gina Torres
- 2021 – NONE (Parade cancelled by COVID-19 pandemic)
- 2022 – LeVar Burton
- 2023 – Gabby Giffords
- 2024 – Audra McDonald
- 2025 – Billie Jean King
- 2026 – Earvin "Magic" Johnson
- 2027 – TBA

== Gallery of recent grand marshals ==
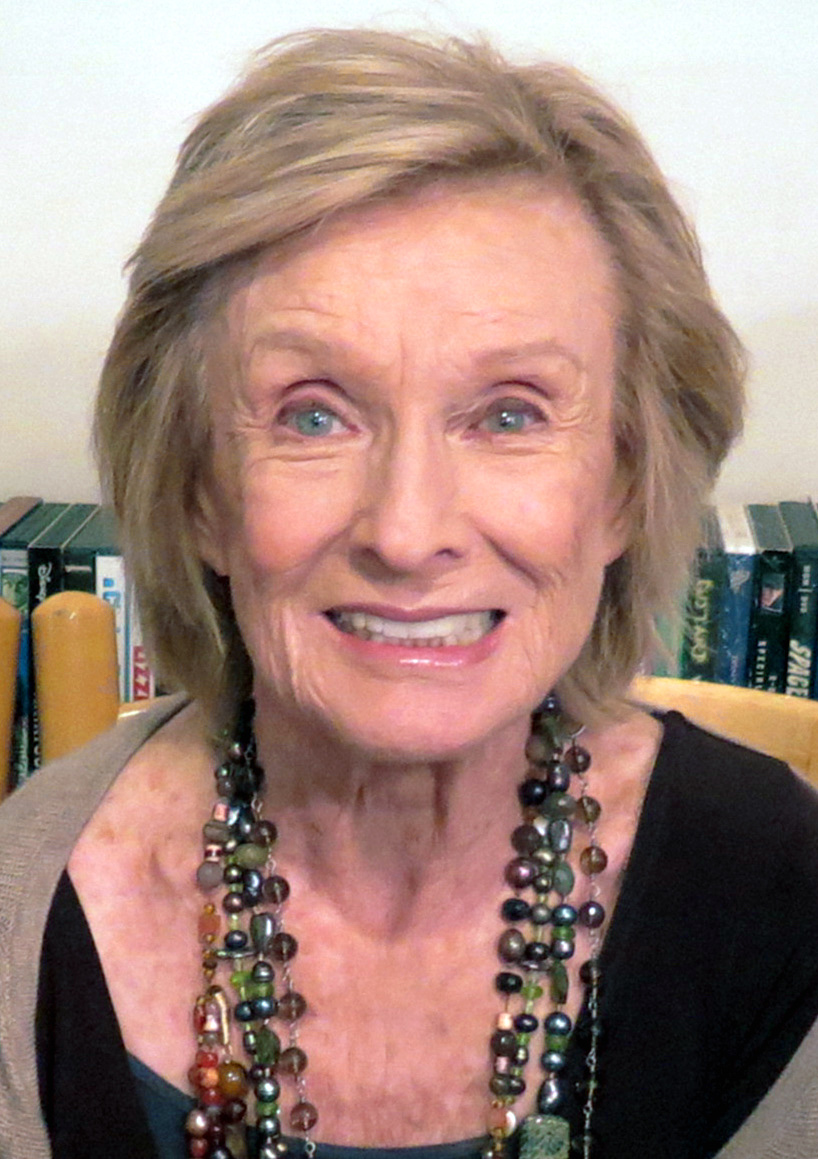
Cloris Leachman, 2009

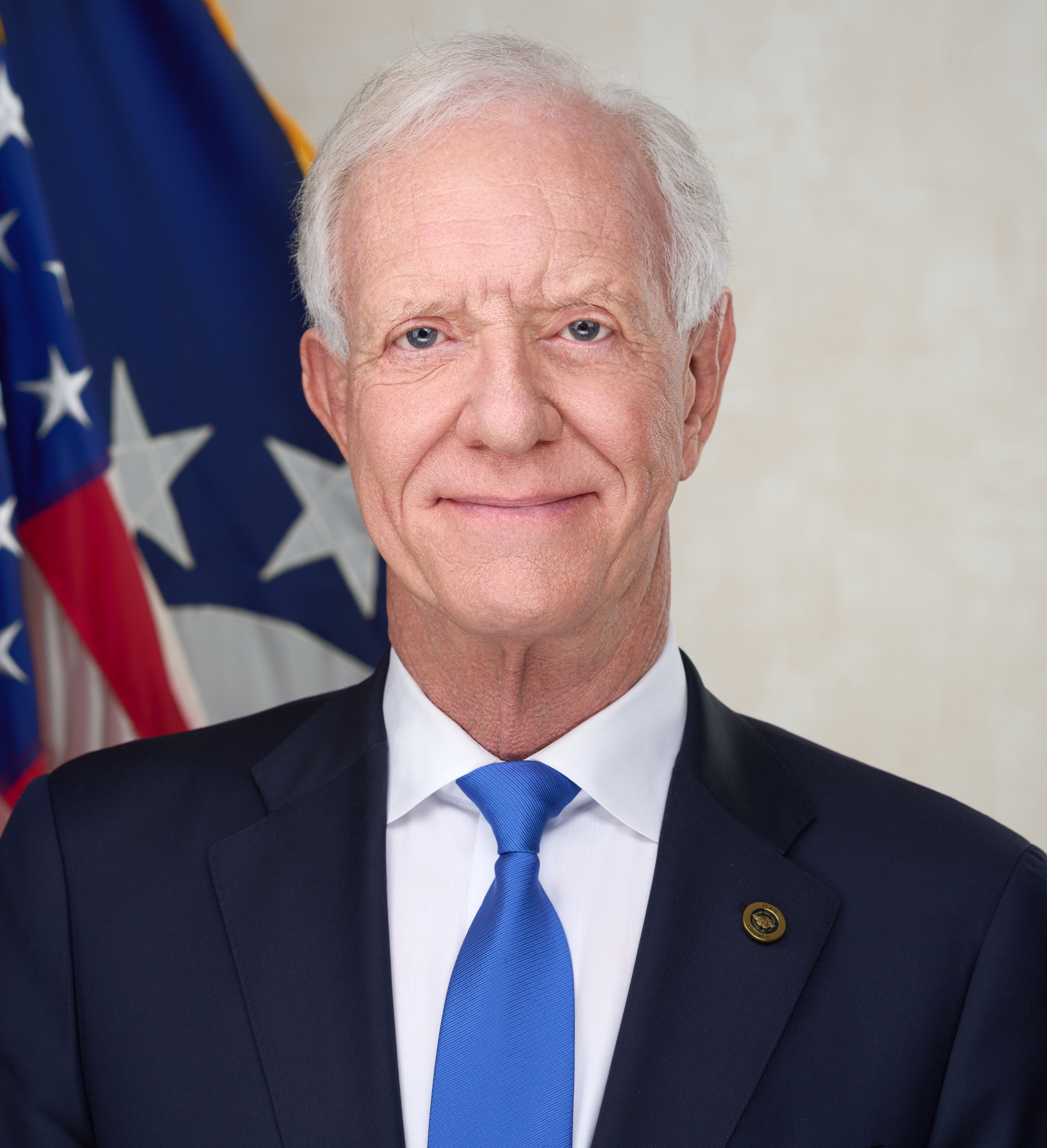
Chesley B. "Sully" Sullenberger III, 2010

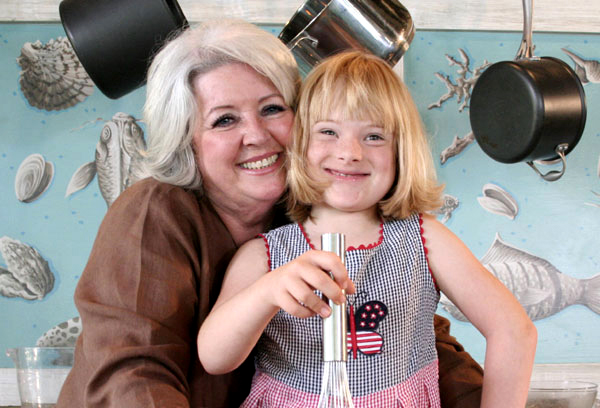
Paula Deen, 2011

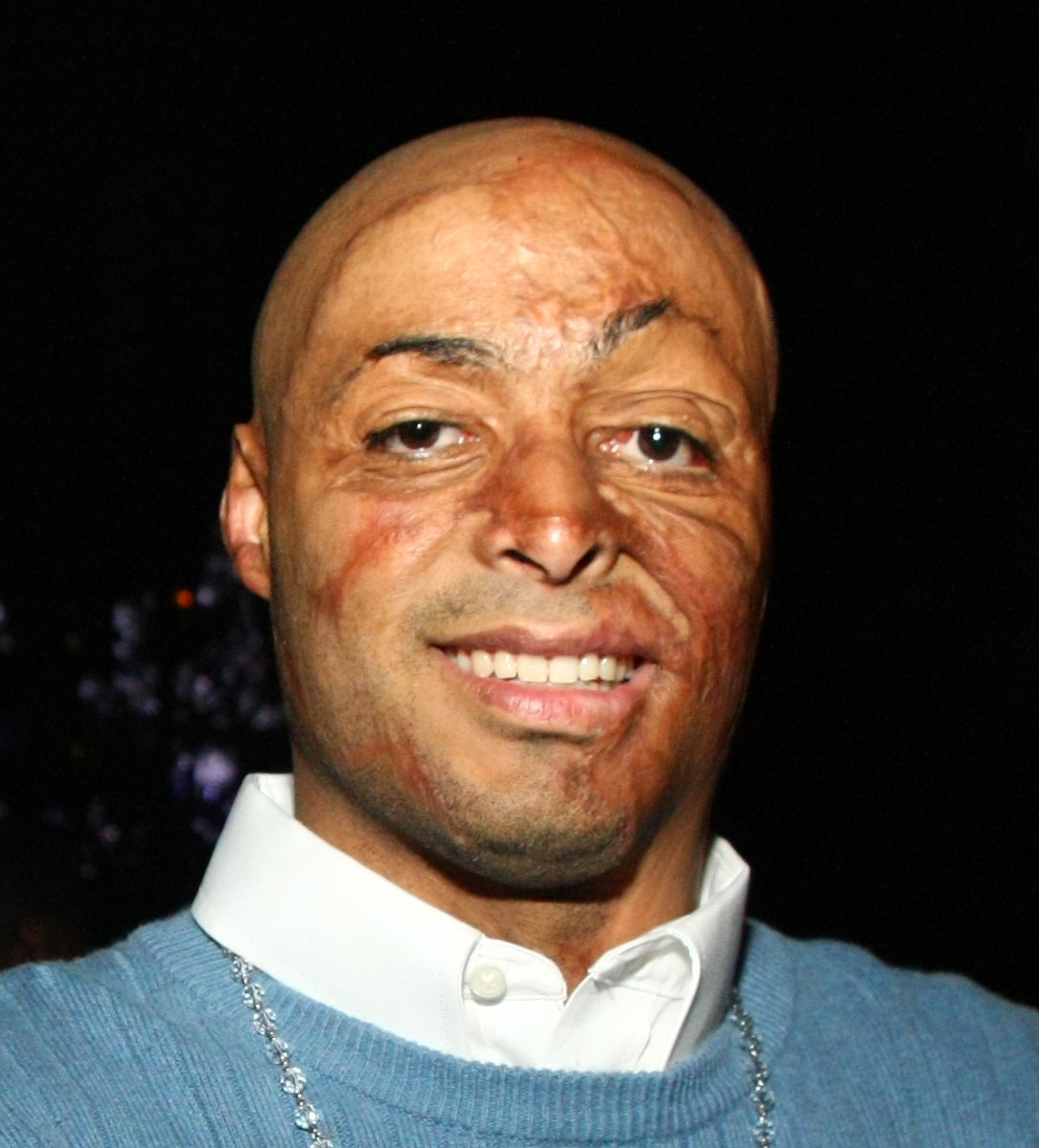
J.R. Martinez, 2012

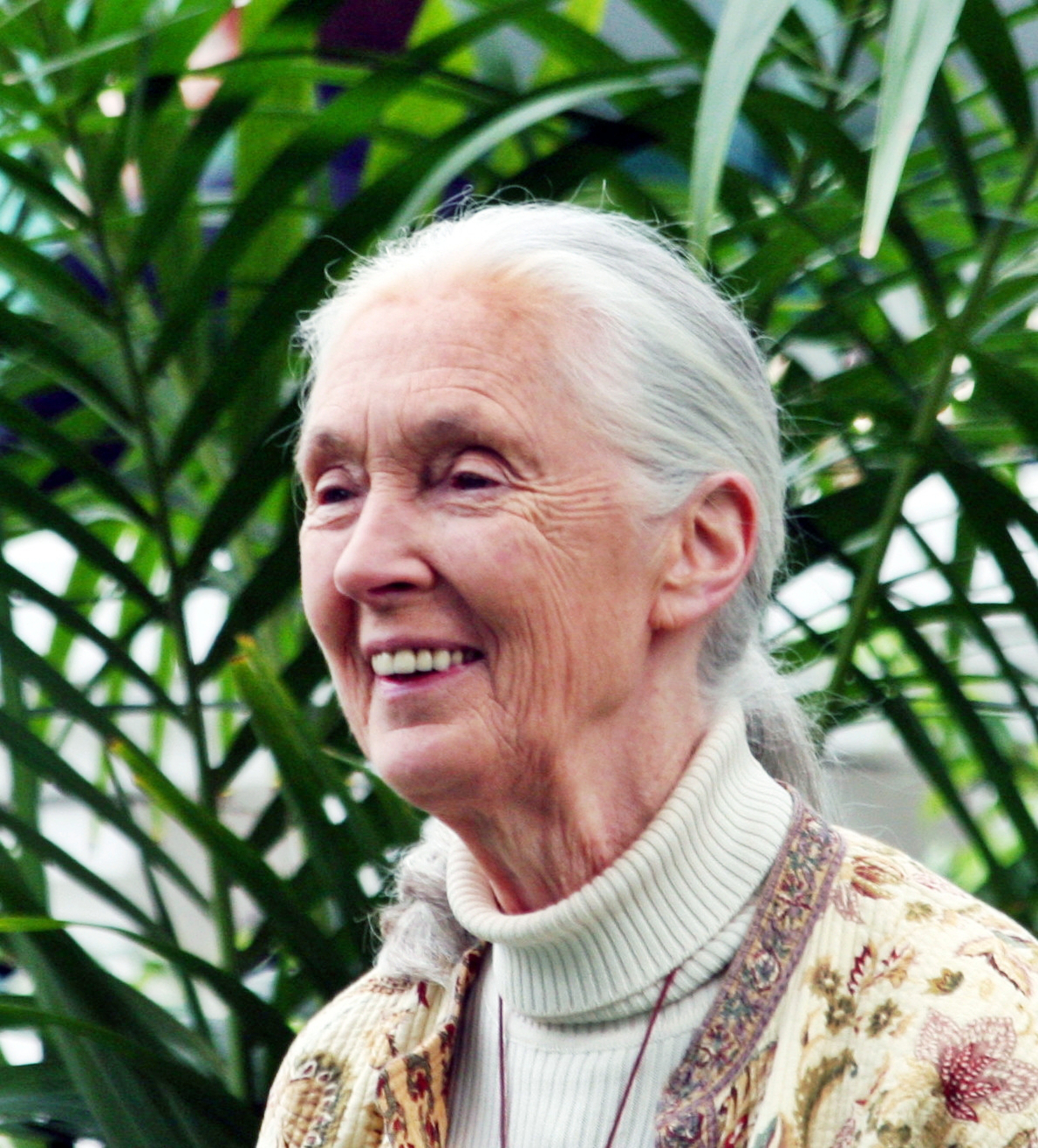
Jane Goodall, 2013

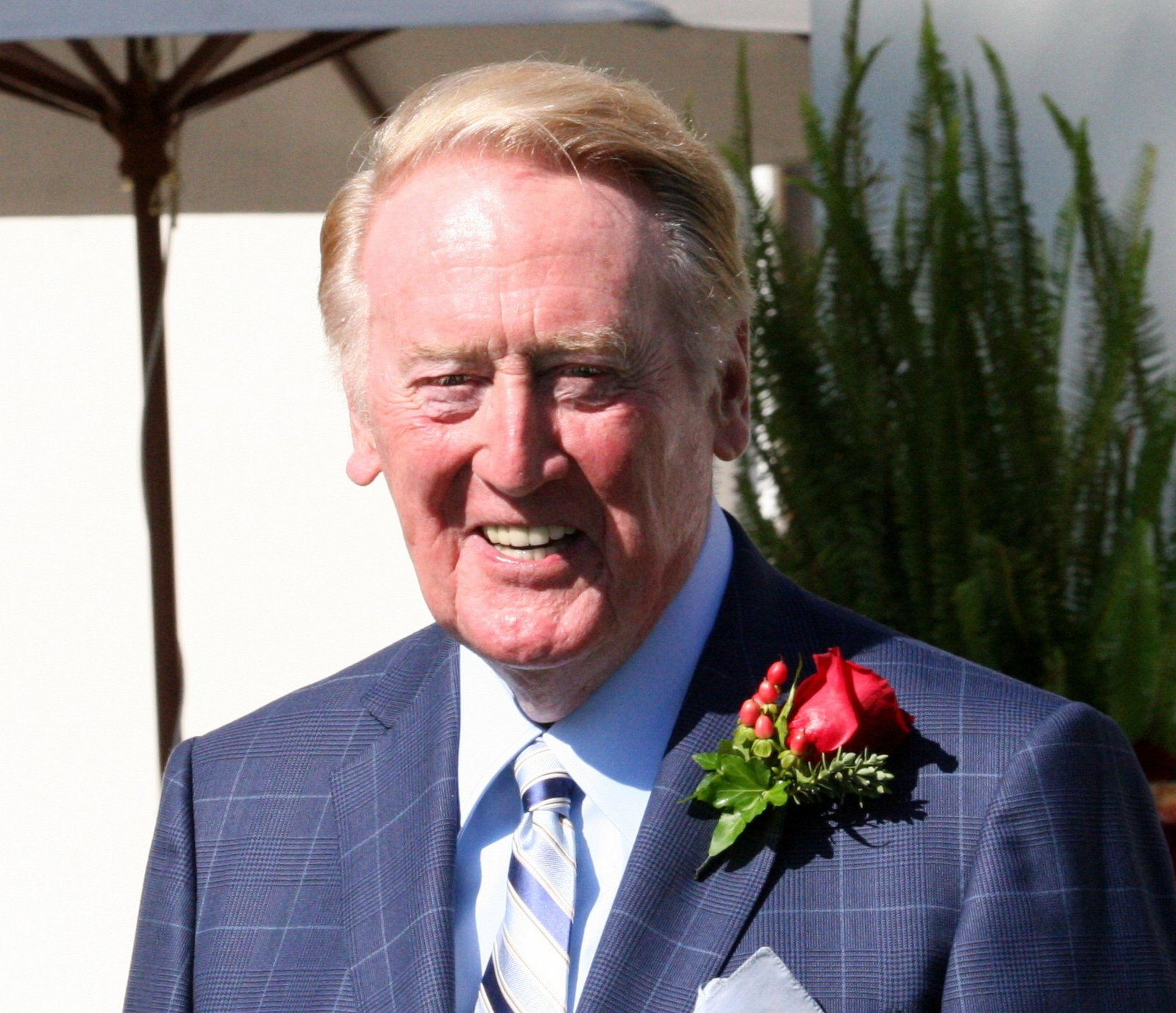
Vin Scully, 2014

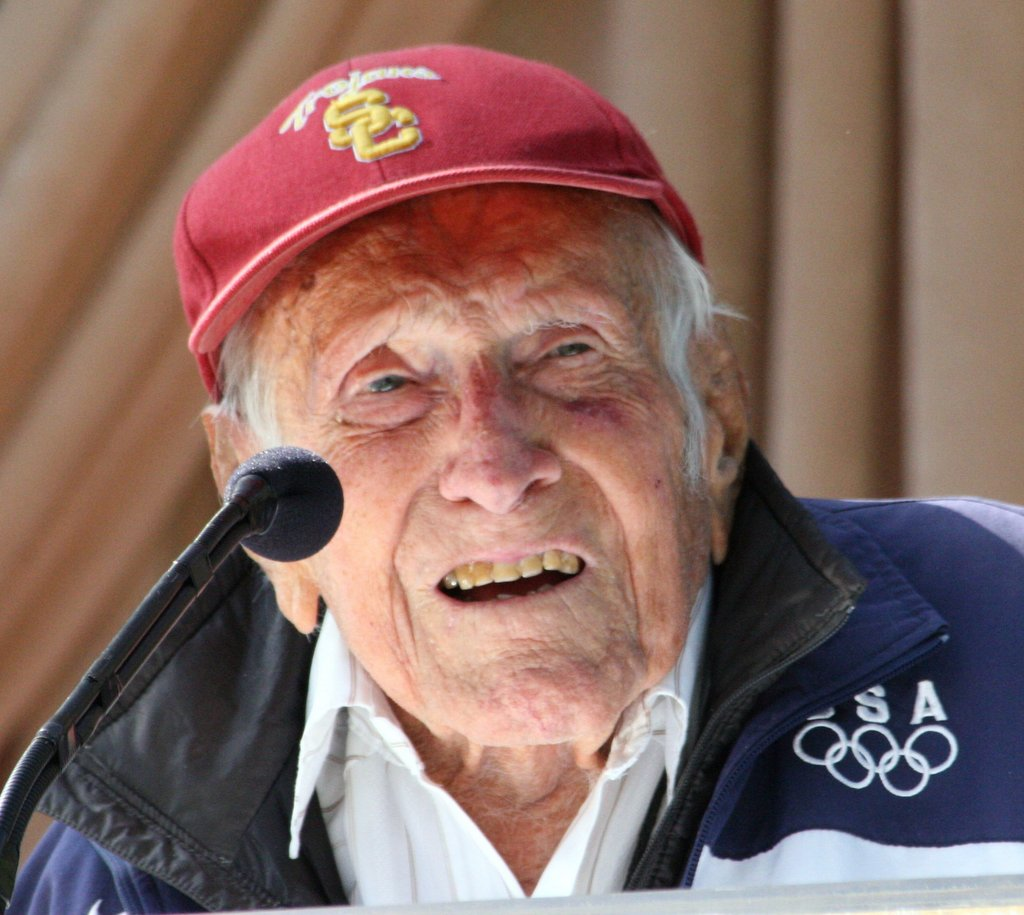
Louis Zamperini, 2015

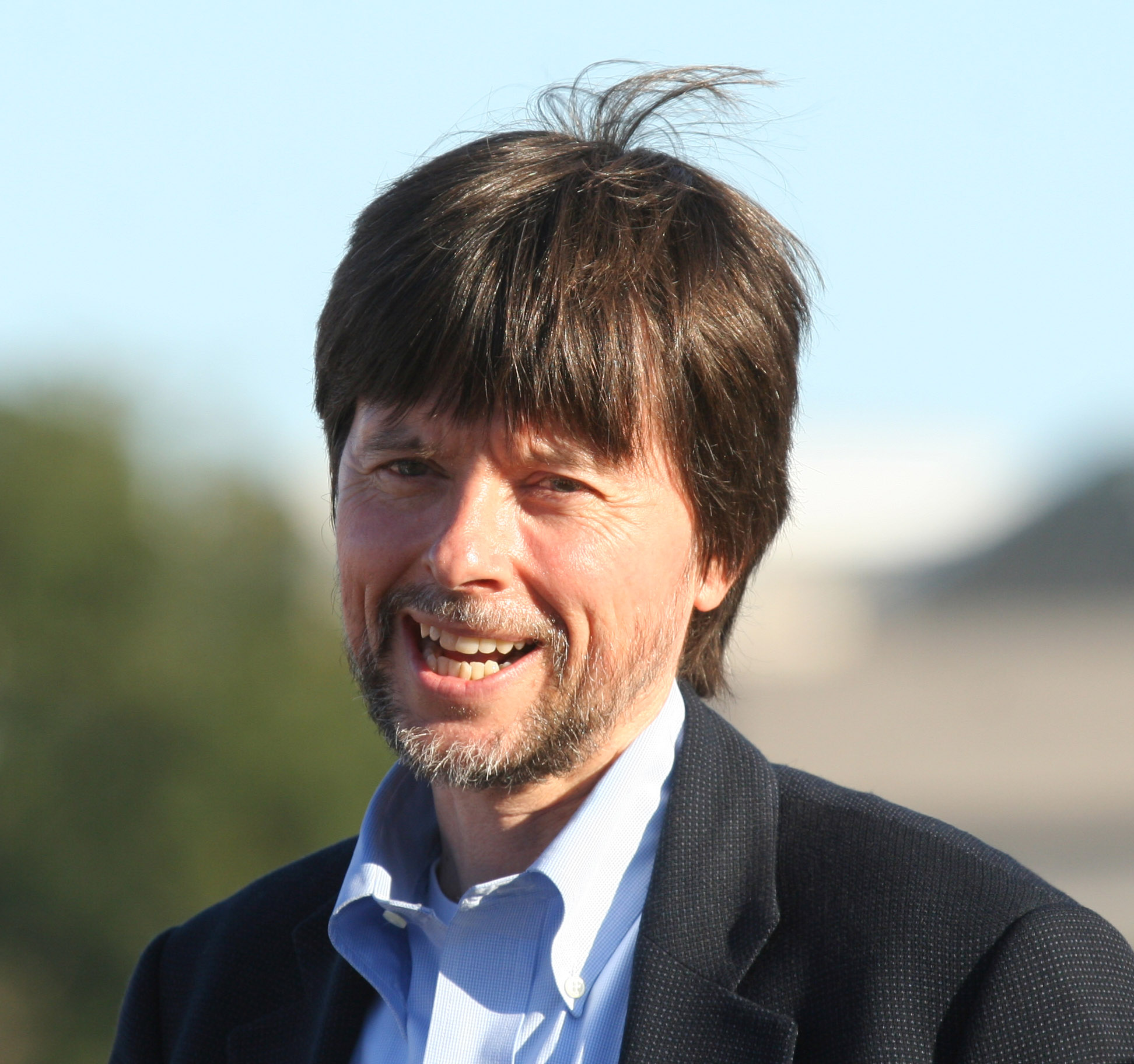
Ken Burns, 2016

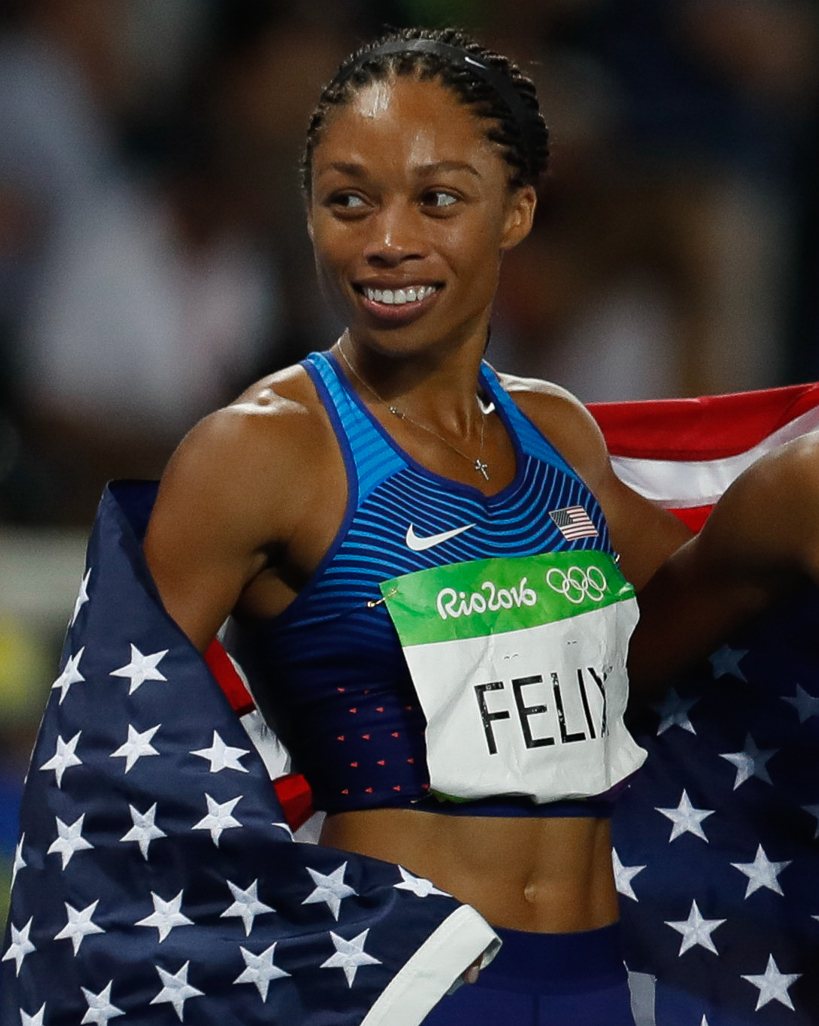
Allyson Felix, 2017

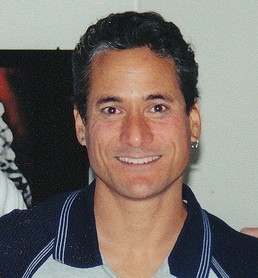
Greg Louganis, 2017

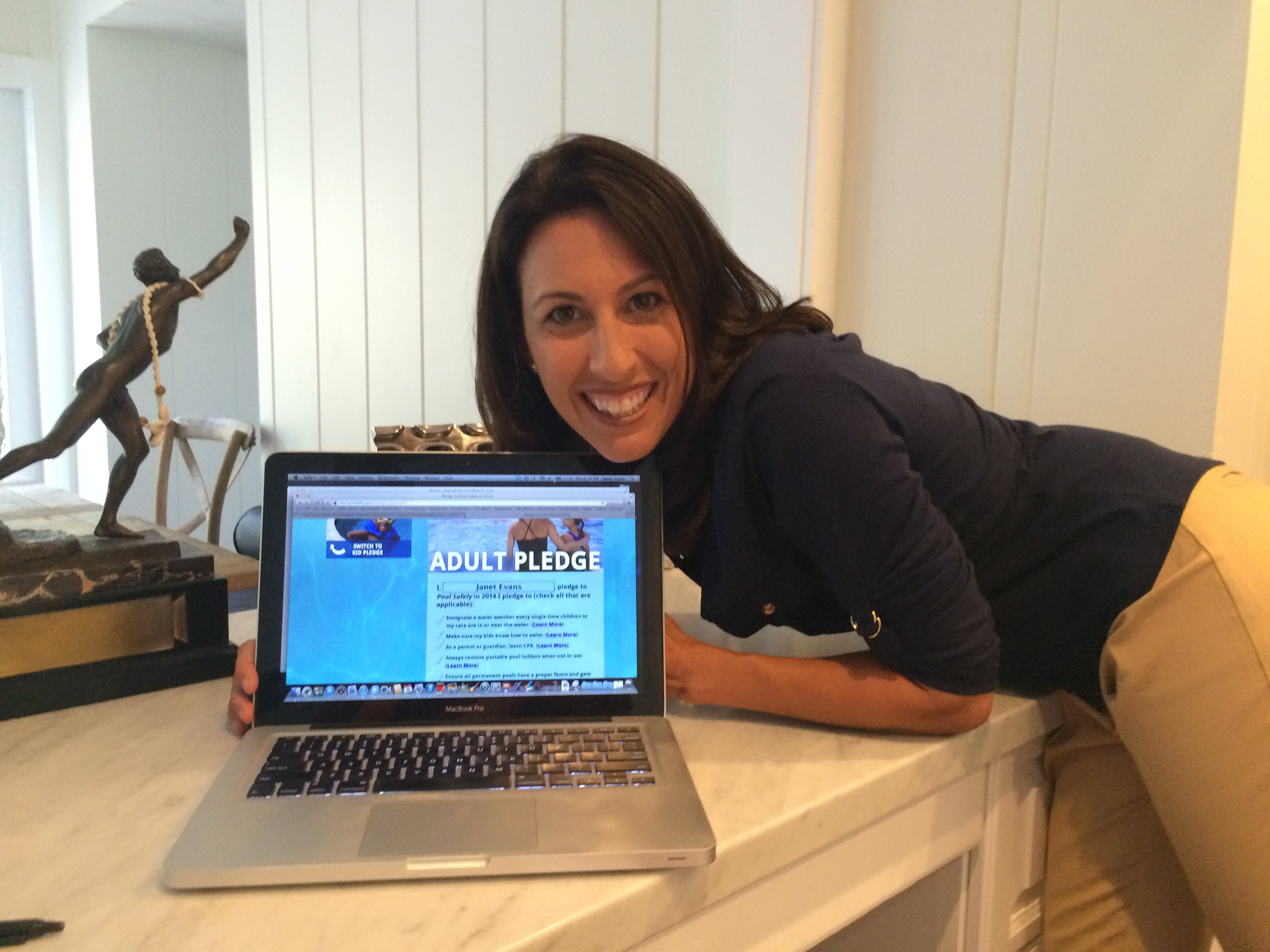
Janet Evans, 2017

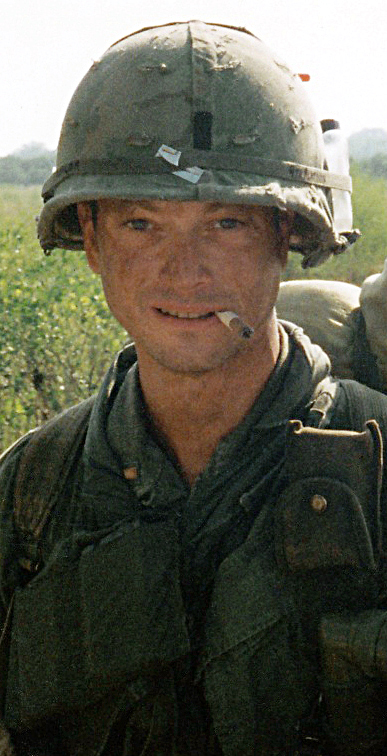
Gary Sinise, 2018

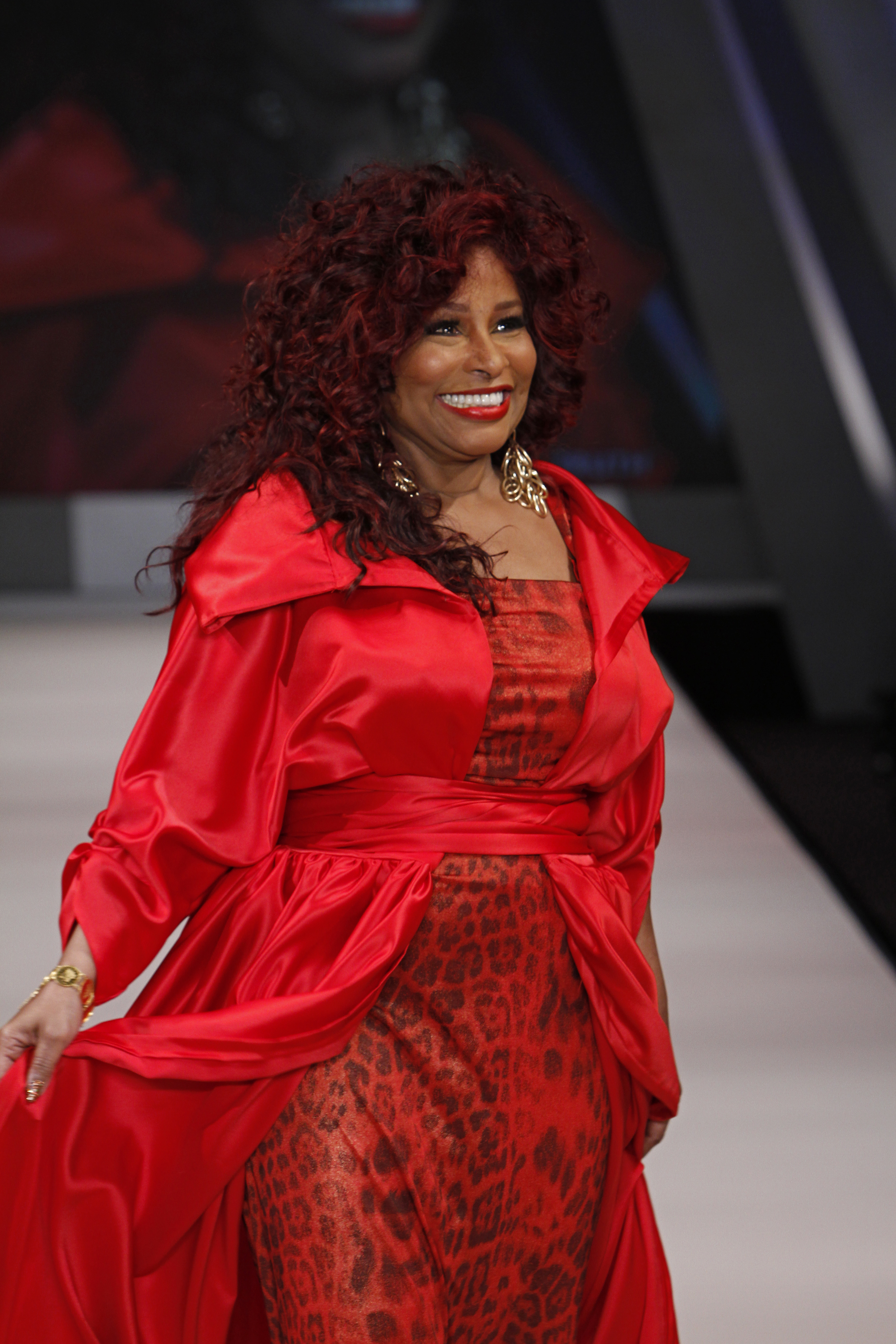
Chaka Khan, 2019

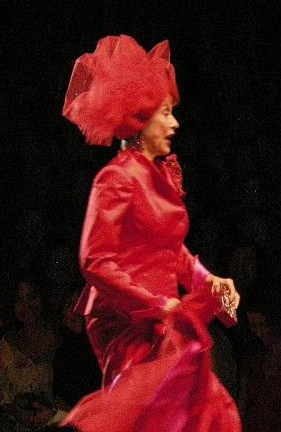
Rita Moreno, 2020

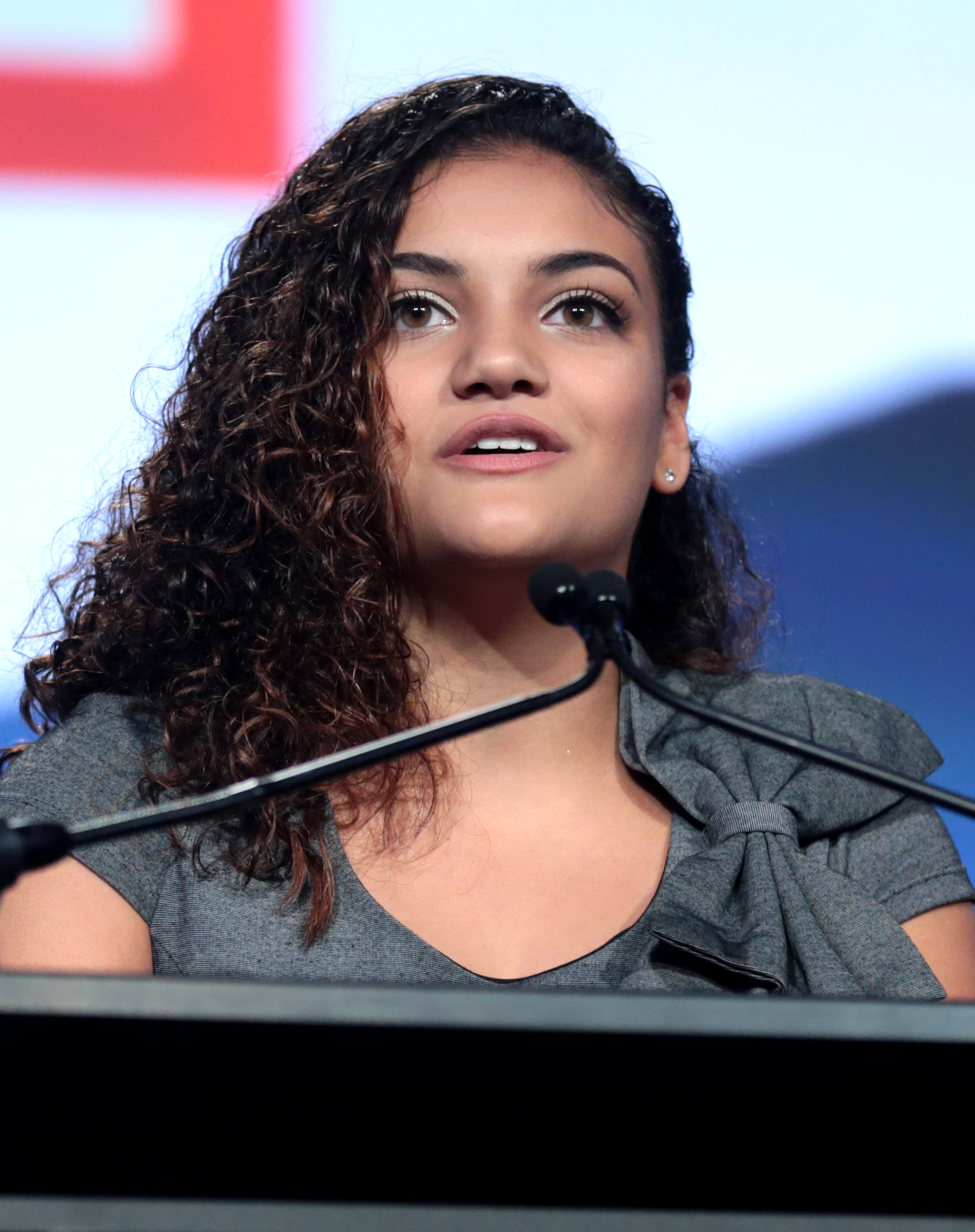
Laurie Hernandez, 2020

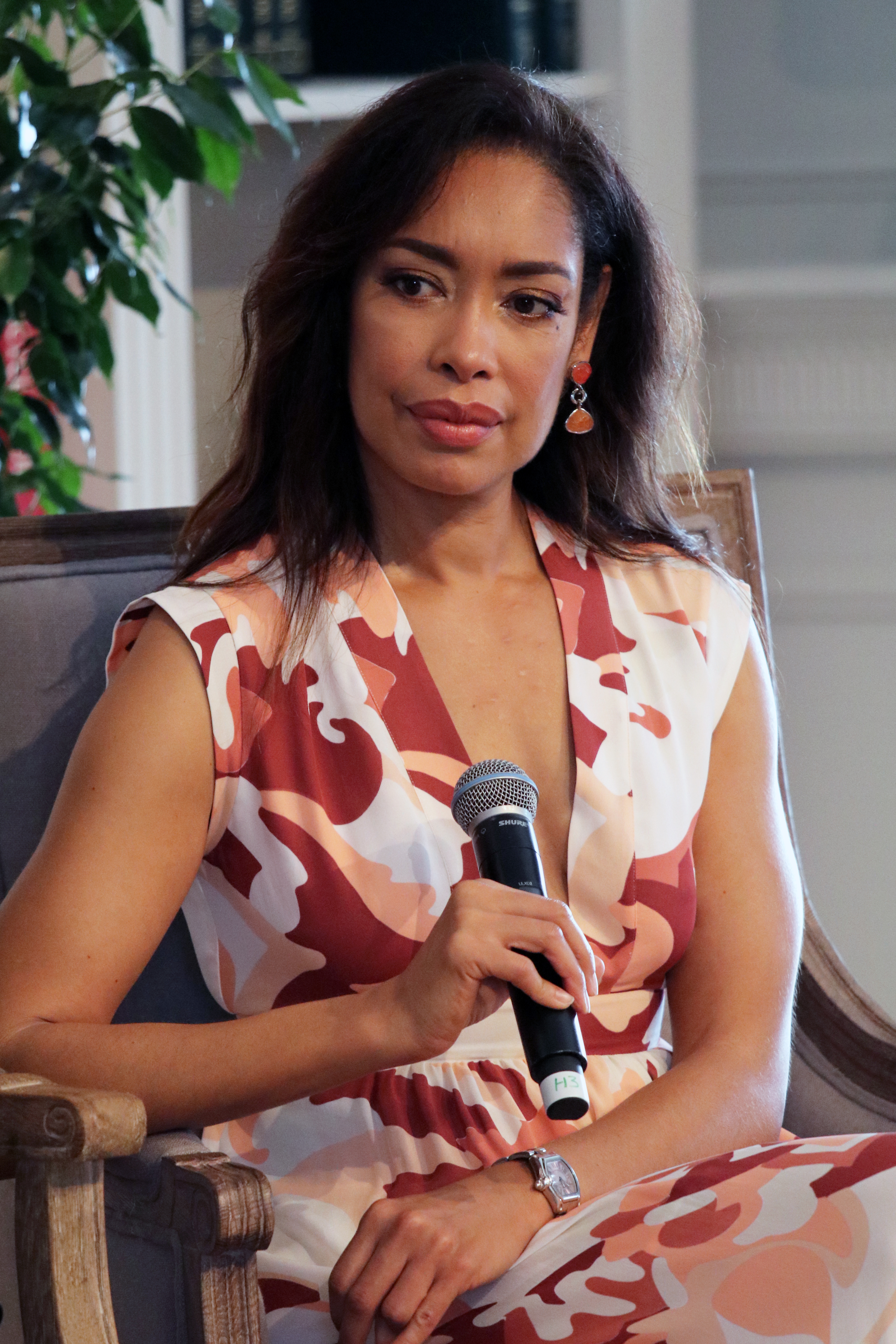
Gina Torres, 2020

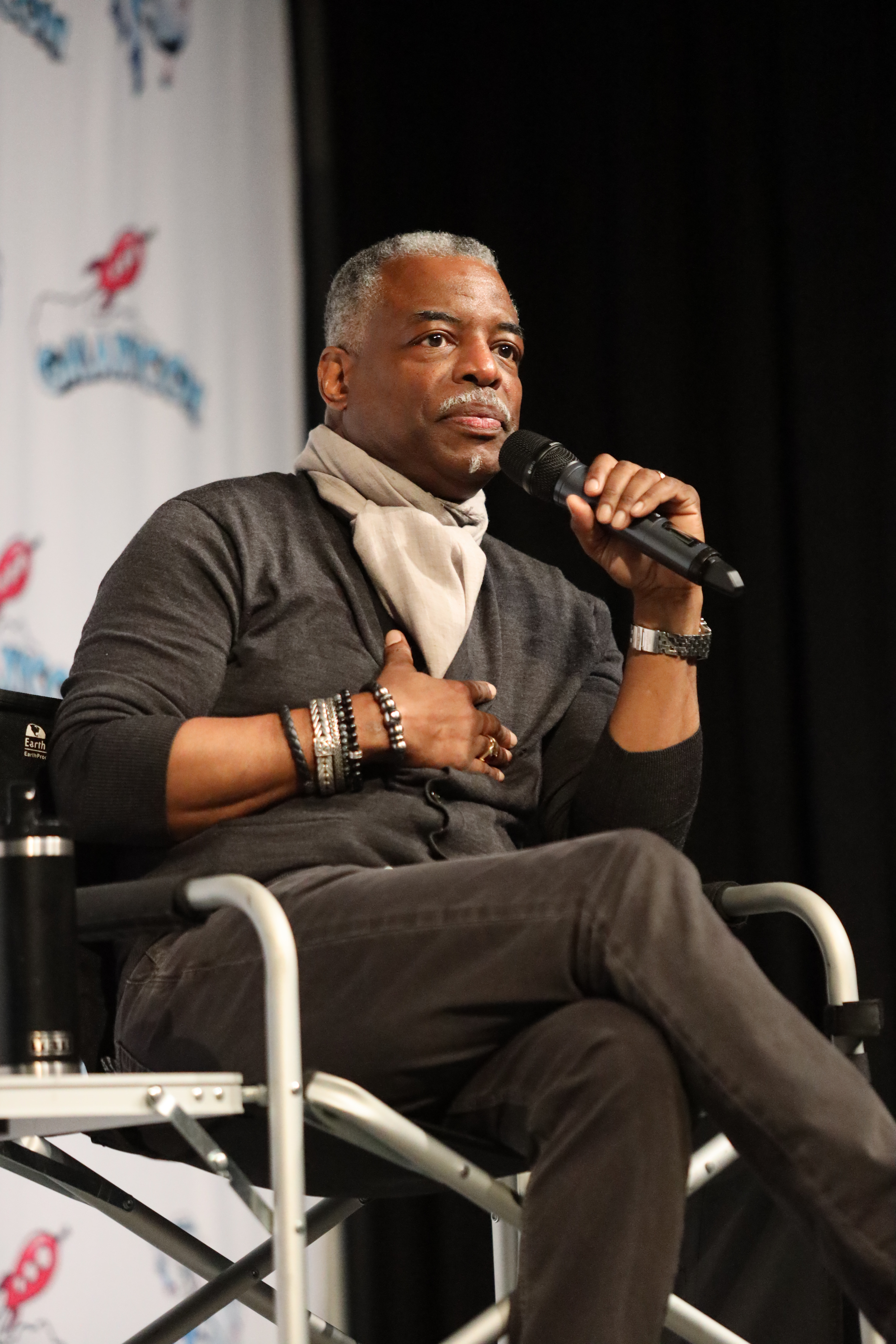
LeVar Burton, 2022

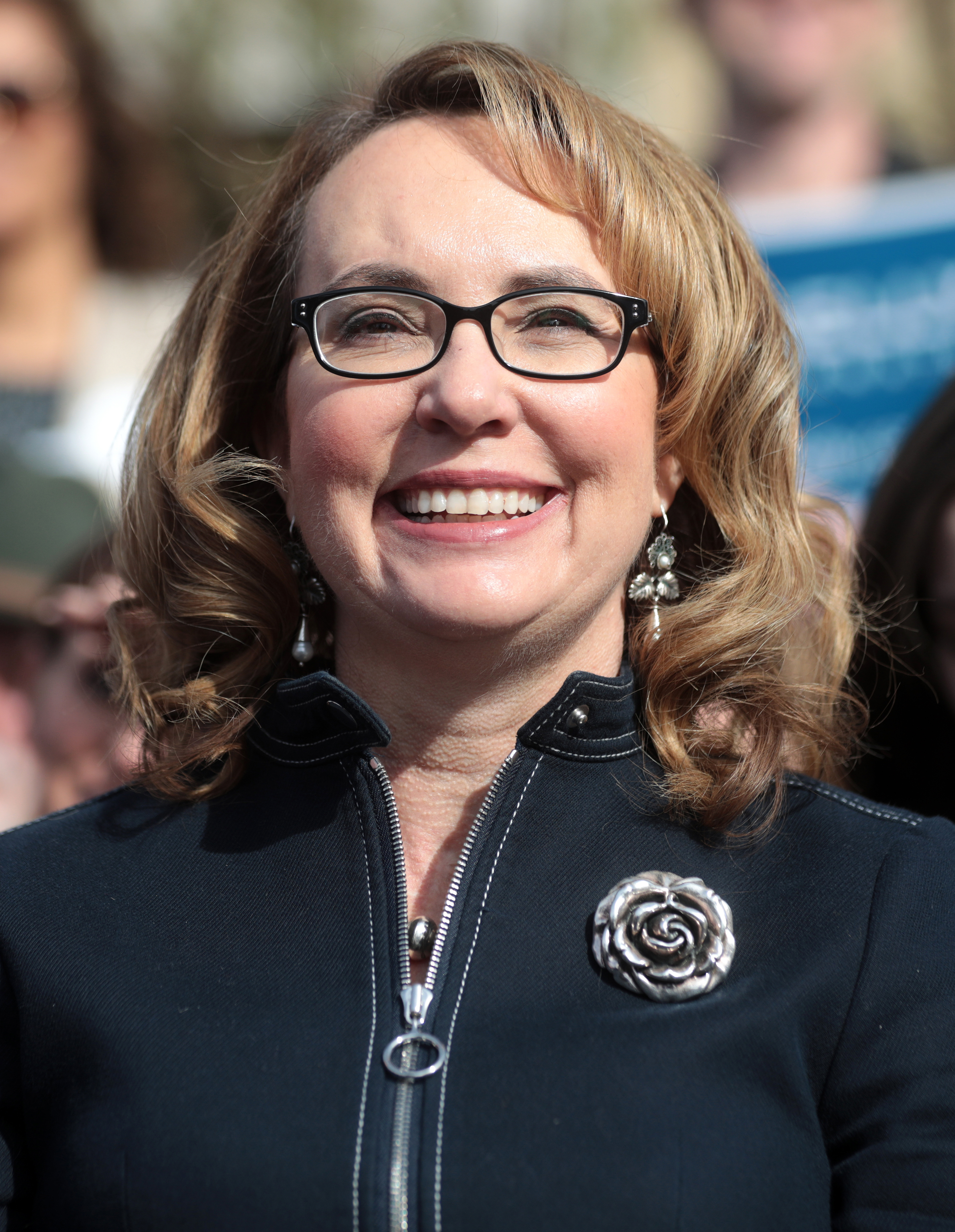
Gabby Giffords, 2023

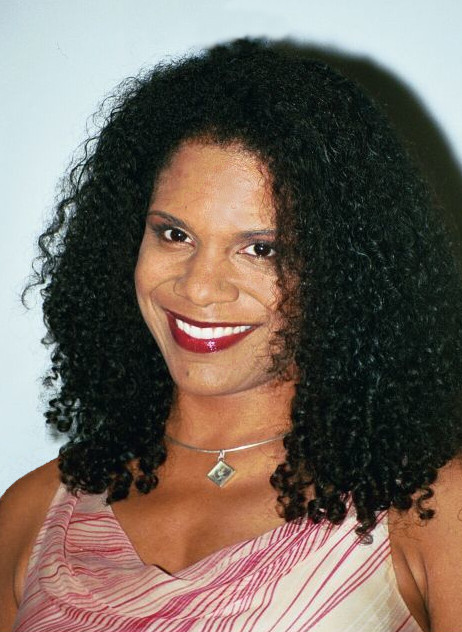
Audra Mcdonald, 2024

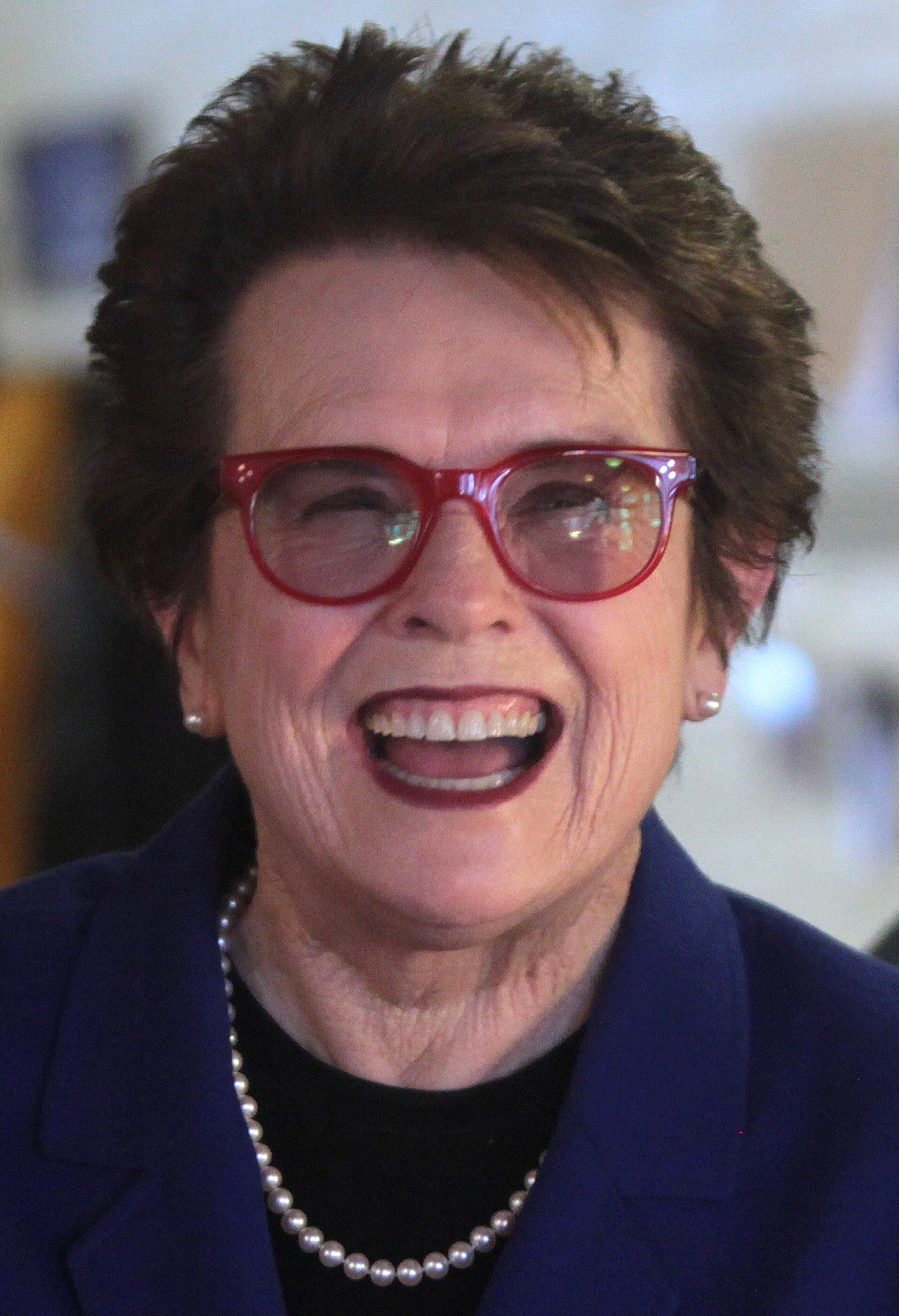
Billie Jean King, 2025

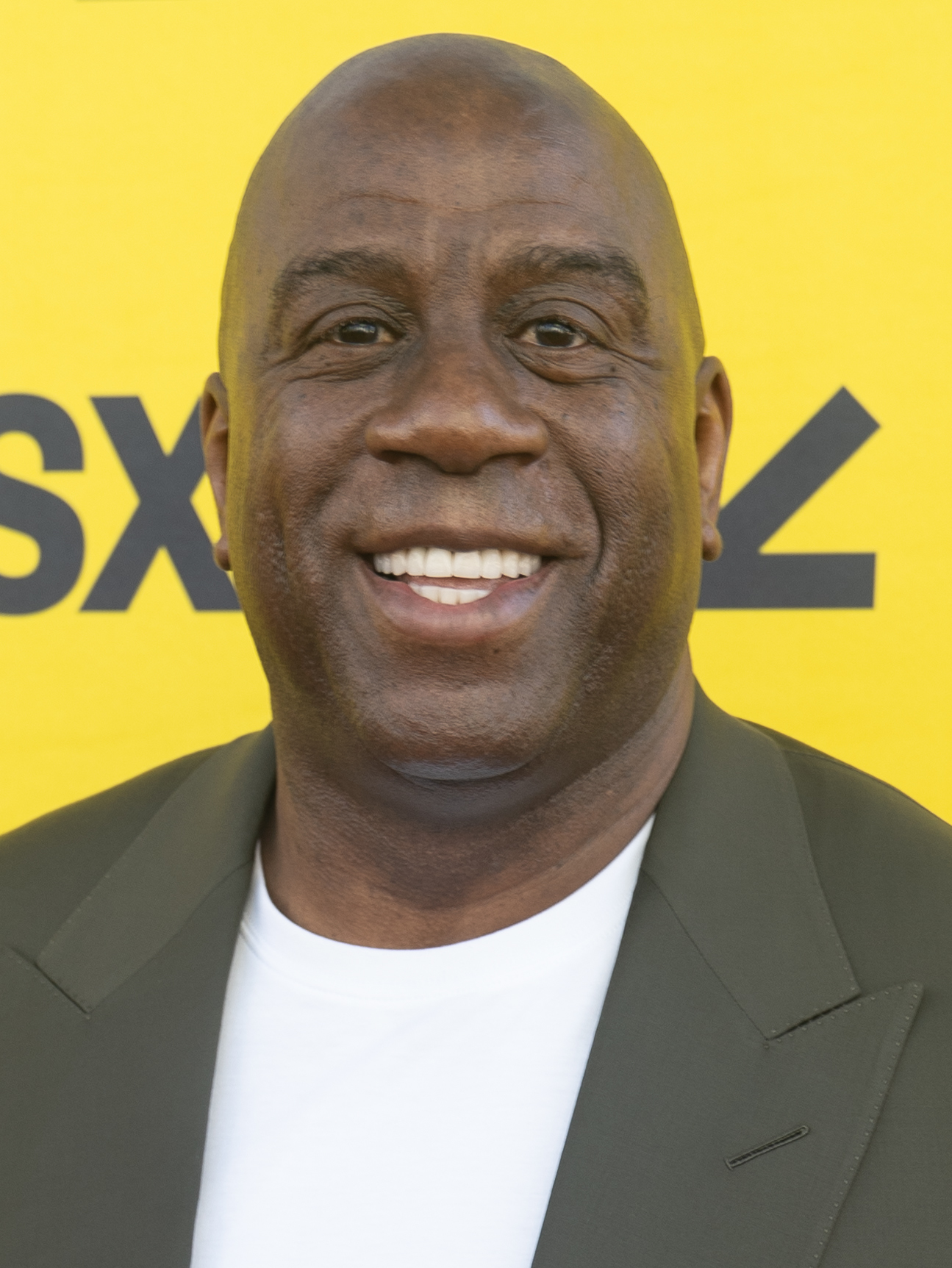
Earvin "Magic" Johnson, 2026
