= Horace Dobbins =

American politician (1868–1962)

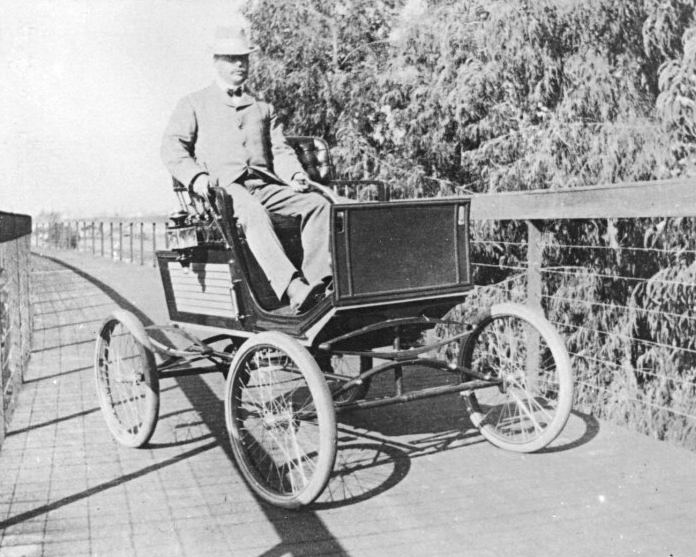
- Dobbins in an automobile, early 1900s

10th Mayor of Pasadena, California
- In office 1900–1901
- Preceded by: George Downing Patten
- Succeeded by: Martin H. Weight

Personal details
- Born: Horace M. Dobbins; August 29, 1868 Philadelphia, Pennsylvania, U.S.
- Died: September 21, 1962 (aged 94)
- Party: Republican
- Occupation: Politician, businessman

Horace M. Dobbins (August 29, 1868 – September 21, 1962) was a Philadelphia-born businessman and politician who served as Mayor of Pasadena, California, United States in 1900–1901.

Horace Dobbins was known for building the California Cycleway from Pasadena to Los Angeles. Horace Dobbins had the exclusive idea of incorporating an elevated tollway for bicycles and other horseless vehicles from the Green Hotel in Pasadena to Los Angeles. This idea was brought to mind on August 23, 1897. Dobbins personally secured the right of way for six miles and the completed route was almost nine miles long. Unfortunately, the project came to a halt with the invention of the automobile. Although the Cycleway stopped being used, its route was transformed into what is now the Arroyo Seco/Pasadena Freeway which now is better known as 110.

Dobbins entered politics very soon after arriving in Pasadena. He was elected a member of the city board of trustees of which he later became president. It was during the cycle craze that Dobbins was elected mayor of Pasadena on April 16, 1900. He served for one year in this position. Following the failure of the Cycleway, Dobbins turned to other pursuits, including the refurbishment of Los Angeles' Agricultural Park (now Exposition Park), the management of the Broadwood hotel in Philadelphia, and the design and sailing of yachts.

Dobbins was also involved with the Americus Club of Pasadena. This club was credited for saving the state for the Republican party in 1896. The idea that Pasadena should organize a marching club was formed on a summer day of 1869. The starters searched for people who were interested and as a result, Dobbins and few more people were invited to a special meeting. There were roles to fill in this organization, so Horace Dobbins served as an adjutant working with many other companies. Later on, after a period of about ten years of continuous active participation in the club, he succeeded Stearns as president.

During this period, before and after he became the mayor of Pasadena, he also had many other activities in addition to the Americus Club of Pasadena. For example, he was also involved with business, the best example being the California Cycleway. Before 1900, he was the vice-president of the El Cajon Valley Company in San Diego county, California. This was a successful company at the time which supported him financially for a few years. After he retired from the office of mayor, he became a member of the Pasadena Board of Trade and the Los Angeles Chamber of Commerce which is now Southern California's dominant business federation. It represents hundreds of thousands business interests in California, making it the largest not for profit business federation in Southern California today.

Apart from business, Dobbins was also very involved in medicine. He had been part of many medical organizations. He served as president of the Pasadena Board of Health. After a few years, he then moved on to Pasadena Hospital Association and again served as its president. Unlike other organizations he had served in, this one still operates today. Nowadays, it is better known as Pasadena's Huntington Memorial Hospital.

In addition to his medical, business, and trade interests, Dobbin also participated in many entertainment organizations. Out of all them, he was especially actively connected with the Pasadena Tournament of Rose Associations. This includes what Pasadena is known for: the Rose Bowl Game, Rose Parades, and Rose Queens.

In his later years, Horace Dobbins became more involved with other activities and non-profit organizations, such as the Pasadena Country Club and the Cumberland Club (which is in Portland, Maine).
