= West Los Angeles Veloway =

Proposed Infrastructure Project

The West Los Angeles Veloway is a bike-bridge project prepared by the Citizens Committee for the West Los Angeles Veloway in 1982-3. The Committee was led by UCLA Faculty David Eisenberg. The planning for the project attracted grant funding. The project also survived for many years as a planning option in the Metro Long Range Transportation Plan. It is also listed in records of the California Transport Commission 1999. It was never constructed. Its aim was to create improved and safer bicycle access to the UCLA campus from the South and the West by protecting cyclists from traffic in the Westwood area. Those involved with the project envisioned it as a spectacular structure, and hoped to complete it for the 1984 Olympics in Los Angeles. The project's name was inspired by the California Cycleway, which was partially built in the late 19th century with the intention of linking Pasadena and Los Angeles before ultimately being dismantled.

The proposed project consisted of an elevated Class 1 bike path starting at Westwood Plaza at UCLA and bifurcating at the southern edge of the Westwood Federal Building into one elevated bike path crossing I-405 and another continuing south along Sepulveda Blvd to Santa Monica Blvd. The elevated path would connect with both new and existing Class II and Class III at-grade bike paths to form a bicycling network linking UCLA and the Westwood area with other Westside communities, including Santa Monica and West Los Angeles.

The West Los Angeles Veloway is not to be confused with a Class 1 bike path which starts at the northeast corner of the Westwood Federal Building in Los Angeles, and runs south from Wilshire Blvd along Veteran Avenue's Western sidewalk. At the southern end of the Federal Building property, it turns west through Westwood Park, crosses Sepulveda Boulevard, runs south along the baseball diamonds, then turns west and runs on the wide sidewalk of Ohio Avenue, under I-405, to Purdue Avenue, where it becomes a Class 3 bike route. The eastbound (southern side) on Ohio Avenue is entirely a Class 2 bike lane between Purdue Ave and Sepulveda Blvd.

While originally envisioned for completion in time for the 1984 Olympics, the project only received grants for exploration, design, and engineering from the Los Angeles County Transportation Committee in 1987 and 1989 along with support from the public agencies possessing much of the land on which the elevated bike path portions would be constructed. However, as early as 1984 the project faced opposition from the Los Angeles Department of Transportation regarding the placement of the piers for the elevated bike path in the center median of Gayley Ave, Sepulveda Blvd, and Weyburn Ave. The City of Los Angeles issued a Notice of Preparation of a Draft Environmental Impact Report on the Veloway to the California Environmental Quality Agency in 1995, but no further development on the project is known to have transpired.

== See also ==
- Santa Monica Cycle Path
- California Cycleway
