= Santa Monica Cycle Path =

Bicycle path in Los Angeles, CA

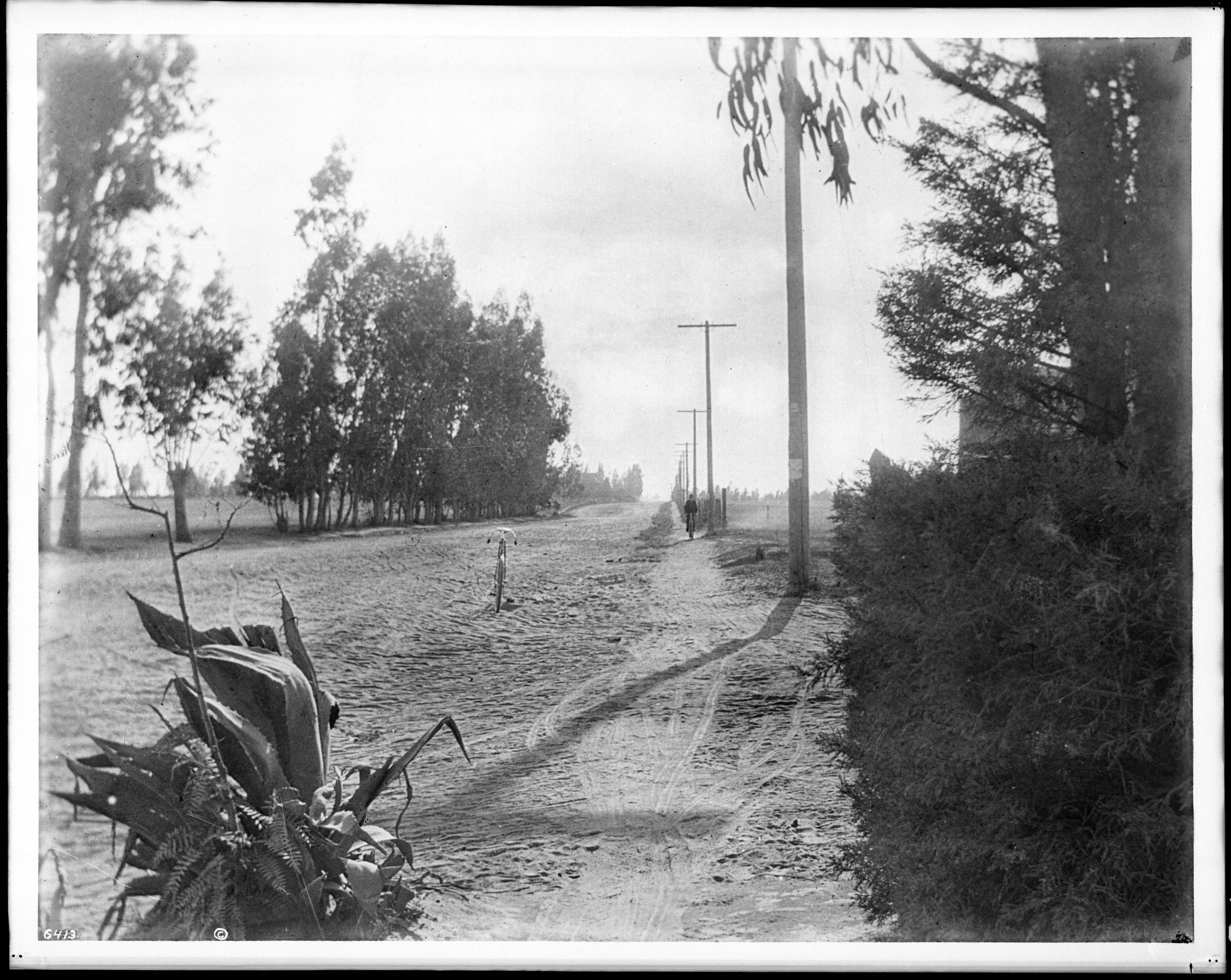
Santa Monica Cycle Path on Washington Boulevard at Western Avenue, looking west, Los Angeles, June 1900

The Santa Monica Cycle Path, opened in 1900, was an 18-mile long, six-foot-wide, gravel bike lane running between the City of Santa Monica, California and downtown Los Angeles. The Santa Monica Cycle Path is referred to as Los Angeles' first bike lane.

== History ==
The effort to fund the Santa Monica Cycle Path began in 1896, organized and built through the efforts of Bob Lennie and Joseph Ostendorff, owners of a bicycle shop located at the corner of Fourth and Main streets.

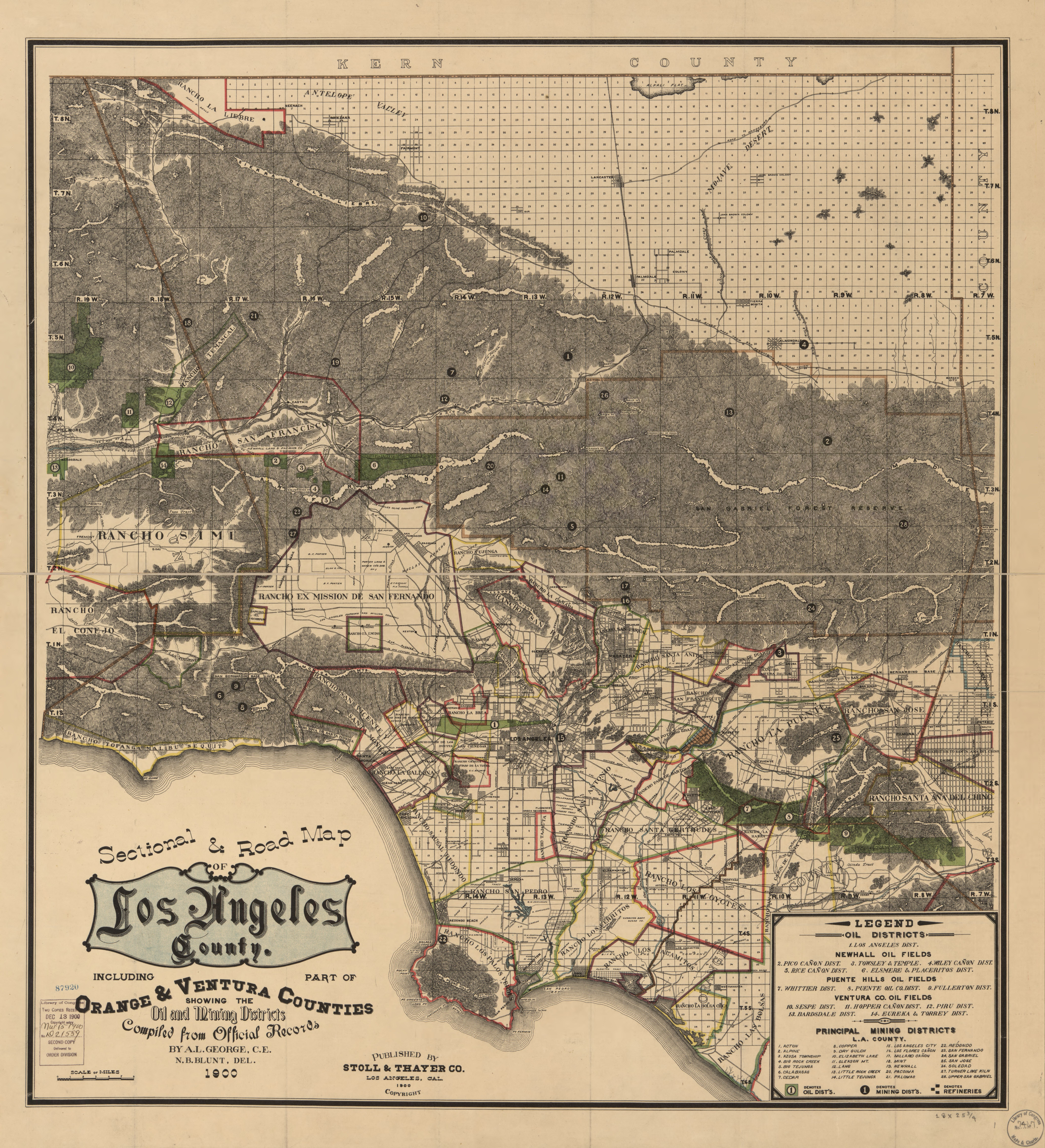
The Santa Monica Cycle Path is visible in this 1900 map of Los Angeles labeled cycle path.

== See also ==
- California Cycleway
- West Los Angeles Veloway
