= Martin H. Weight =

American politician (1855–1920)

Martin Henry Weight
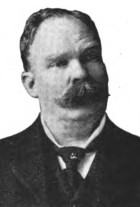

11th Mayor of Pasadena
- In office 1901–1903
- Preceded by: Horace Dobbins
- Succeeded by: William Vedder

Personal details
- Born: April 7, 1855 Salt Lake City, Utah
- Died: July 21, 1920 (aged 65) Pasadena, California
- Party: Republican
- Spouse: Jamina Margaret Jack (1876 - 1920) (his death)
- Children: Erle Martin Weight; Waldo Weight
- Parent(s): Martin Weight, Eliza Fanny Gay
- Profession: Builder

Martin H. Weight (April 7, 1855 – July 21, 1920) was an American politician who was the first mayor of Pasadena, California, elected by popular vote. During his administration, Pasadena's first two parks were established as well as the completion of Pasadena's first City Hall building. Weight ran for re-election in 1903, but lost to William Vedder.

Weight settled in Pasadena in 1875. He served as chair of the Los Angeles County citrus exhibit at the 1893 World's Columbian Exposition in Chicago, Illinois. Weight was the leader of the Pasadena branch of the Benevolent and Protective Order of Elks.
