= Raymond Hotel =

Hotel in South Pasadena, California

Coordinates: 34.1239924°N 118.1481771°W

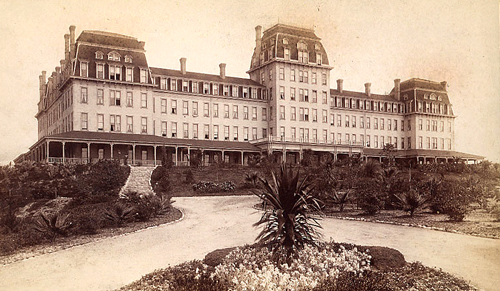
The original Raymond Hotel, built 1886, burned down 1895.

The Raymond Hotel was a hotel in South Pasadena, California, and first major resort hotel of the San Gabriel Valley. Largely a winter residence for wealthy Easterners, it was built by Mr. Walter Raymond of Raymond & Whitcomb Travel Agency of Boston, Massachusetts. The hotel was built atop Bacon Hill which lies between Pasadena and South Pasadena and was renamed Raymond Hill with the opening of the hotel in 1886. The original hotel, a grand and unequivocal Victorian edifice was burned to the ground in 1895. A second building, of a later and more fireproof style, was erected in 1901 and equally replaced the older in grandeur. The hotel was foreclosed following the Great Depression and was razed for commercial development.

== History ==
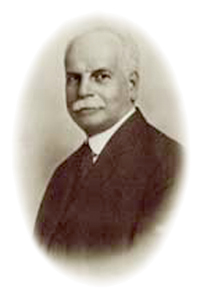
Walter Raymond

=== War Veterans, Health Seekers, and Tourists ===
In 1883, Walter Raymond had ventured west to the young community of Pasadena, California, described as a sleepy village of 1,500 people. Seeking to excite business in the transcontinental tour market, he noticed that the yet unincorporated town had no hotels for visitors. This piqued his interest in establishing one, thereby purchasing a hard granite hilltop called Bacon Hill as the site for his new Raymond Hotel. The dynamiting and grading off of 35 feet (11 m) of the hilltop came to more than twice Raymond's estimates, and he turned to his father Emmons Raymond for assistance. The elder Raymond was president of the Boston & Passumsic Railroad and one of the 40 original stockholders of the Santa Fe Railroad.

Interested in at least surveying the site of the hotel, Emmons arrived in Pasadena during a downpour and sat under an oak tree listening to his son expound over the beauty of the Southern California area. But the rain poured down leaving Walter hopeless in convincing Emmons. When the sun finally did break through the clouded sky it was a sight the old man had never experienced in his life and he agreed to finance the rest of Walter's construction.

=== Royal Raymond - The First Major Resort Hotel in the San Gabriel Valley ===
The new Raymond Hotel opened with a gala ball on November 17, 1886, and enjoyed nine successful seasons (winters). However, the original structure was a wood framed Victorian with a shingled roof boasting some 200 rooms — and 80 chimneys.

=== Easter Sunday fire, 1895 ===
On April 14, 1895, a spark from a chimney set the roof on fire and the hotel and all its contents burned to the ground in 40 minutes. At the time there were 165 guests staying at the hotel, but most were at church on Easter Sunday, and as fortune would have it, no one was hurt though all their possessions were lost.

Walter Raymond was not to be disheartened by this loss. He immediately began promoting the area through publications and authors of publications who could attest to the attractiveness of the area. He attempted to augment the insurance money through a $250,000 bond issue, but there were too few people in the area with enough money to support it. Finally, a good friend and seasonal resident of the hotel, Mr. Richard T. Crane of Crane Plumbing, Chicago, agreed to a $300,000 mortgage, which was applied to the building of a second hotel.

=== Rebuilding ===
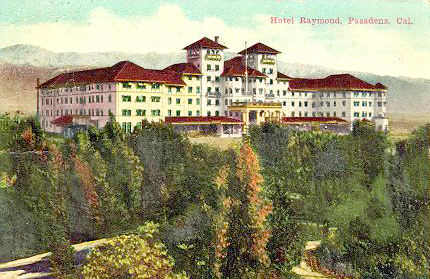
The second Raymond Hotel built 1901, torn down 1934.

The second hotel opened on December 19, 1901, and was met with immediate success especially from those who had lost their winter residence for 6 years. The registry was filled with names of moguls from the East: Pullman, Schwab, Harriman, Swift, Armour, Rockefeller, Morgan, Carnegie, and of course R. T. Crane who spent his remaining winters at the Raymond.

The newer facility had a larger foundation base, was more fireproof, and sported an architectural style more in keeping with the time. It had 300 rooms many with private baths, which was not a feature of the original. Fireplaces gave way to steam heating; the wood exterior was exchanged for concrete and stucco; the roof was tiled, not shingled, and electric lighting came with the plans. The plans also included an abundance of fire doors and extinguishers.

== Guests ==
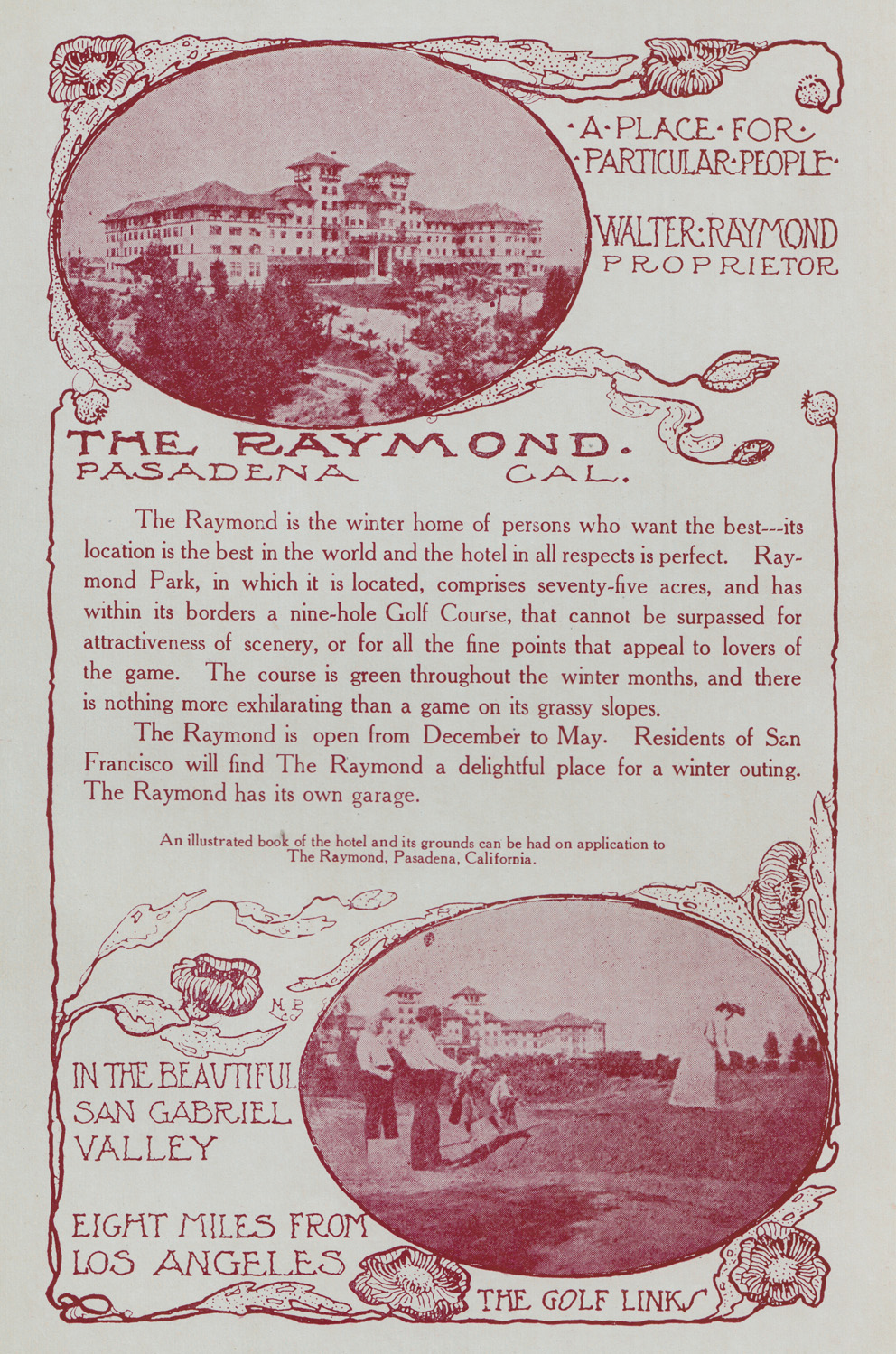
1911 Raymond Hotel ad

Guests invariably arrived by train, the mainline Santa Fe which stopped at Raymond Station at the bottom of the hill. Many had private cars that would park on the side spur near the station. All guests were ferried by a horse-drawn bus to the hotel at the top of the hill. Much to the dismay of many guests, the old station closed down in deference to a newer station built up the tracks closer to downtown Pasadena. Guests were then forced to take an auto bus the extra distance to the hotel.

Part of the success of the Raymond was the transcontinental tours which came through the hotel. The tours were discontinued as the onslaught of newcomers repeatedly bothered the regular guests, who by now were a mainstay of the hotel.

In 1903 President Theodore Roosevelt visited Pasadena and the Raymond on his Panama Canal campaign. However, the crowd was not near the size of the one who came to see Charlie Chaplin as he appeared for lunch with opera singer Nellie Melba.

== Amenities ==
A hotel of this size of course had several amenities and Raymond always set aside profits (or borrowed money) to add something he thought might be important for business. Even though the hotel only opened from December to April (it never opened year round), Raymond kept himself busy over the summer with some sort of improvement. The dining room was the largest room in the house able to seat 400 people. Pasadena City, which boasted of being a “dry” town, had an ordinance disallowing the sales of alcohol — except to the hotel guests.

The hotel had a large nursery operation with 500 American Beauty rose plants, 4 acres (16,000 m^{2}) of carnations and a reported 3,000 pansies. There was a nine-hole golf course on a 50-acre (200,000 m^{2}) lot alongside the hotel, and though it was humble in comparison, it was one of the few good attractions in the area. Much of the landscaping was done by the suggestion of the Mr. Theodore Payne, a famous local horticulturist of the time. The hotel also had card rooms, writing rooms, a reception room, and in the basement was a pool and billiards parlor — with a secret bar.

== Local competition ==
The Raymond Hotel had its steady guests in spite of the fact that it also had competition from other hotels about Pasadena that were opened year round. Even Raymond's own chief lieutenant opened up his own hotel, the Wentworth, which within ten years had become financially distressed and was assumed by the grand estate of Henry E. Huntington, thus named the Huntington Hotel. There were the Hotel Green, a few blocks north on Raymond Avenue, the Vista Del Arroyo which overlooked the Arroyo Seco, and the Maryland Hotel on Colorado Boulevard.

Raymond had reduced the $300,000 mortgage to $75,000, but come the Great Depression (1931) and the large traffic from the east fizzled. The bank which assumed the original loan from Mr. Crane foreclosed on the hotel, and Walter Raymond lost the property. The owner of the Maryland Hotel, Daniel M. Linnard, sought to manage the property for a while, but in 1934, the year of Walter Raymond's death, the hotel was torn down for commercial development.

== Books Available: South Pasadena's Raymond Hotel ==
The book titled "South Pasadena's Raymond Hotel" was published by Arcadia Publishing in Oct. 2008 (127 pages). The author Rick Thomas also devotes Chapter 2 ("The Raymond", pages 19–30) to the Raymond Hotel in his book titled "South Pasadena" published by Arcadia Publishing in 2007.
