= Raymond Hill/Arroyo Del Mar, Pasadena, California =

Industrial-business district

Coordinates: 34.124°N 118.148°W

Raymond Hill is a neighborhood in Pasadena, California. The northern part of the district is sometimes referred to as Arroyo Del Mar. It is an industrial strip about one mile (1.6 km) long and 1/4 mile (0.40 km) wide, bordered by Del Mar Boulevard to the north, South Pasadena to the south, Fair Oaks Avenue to the west, and Marengo Avenue to the east. Despite its name, Raymond Hill itself is a few blocks south of the neighborhood, in South Pasadena.

== Education ==
Raymond Hill is served by McKinley School and Blair High School. Mayfield Junior School is a private school in the area.

== Transportation ==
The Metro A Line operates a station on Fillmore Street, at the neighborhood's center. Raymond Hill is served by Metro Local lines 260 and 261. It is also served by Pasadena Transit routes 20, 51 and 52.
