= LAPD Red Squad raid on John Reed Club art show =

1933 anti-communist attack in California

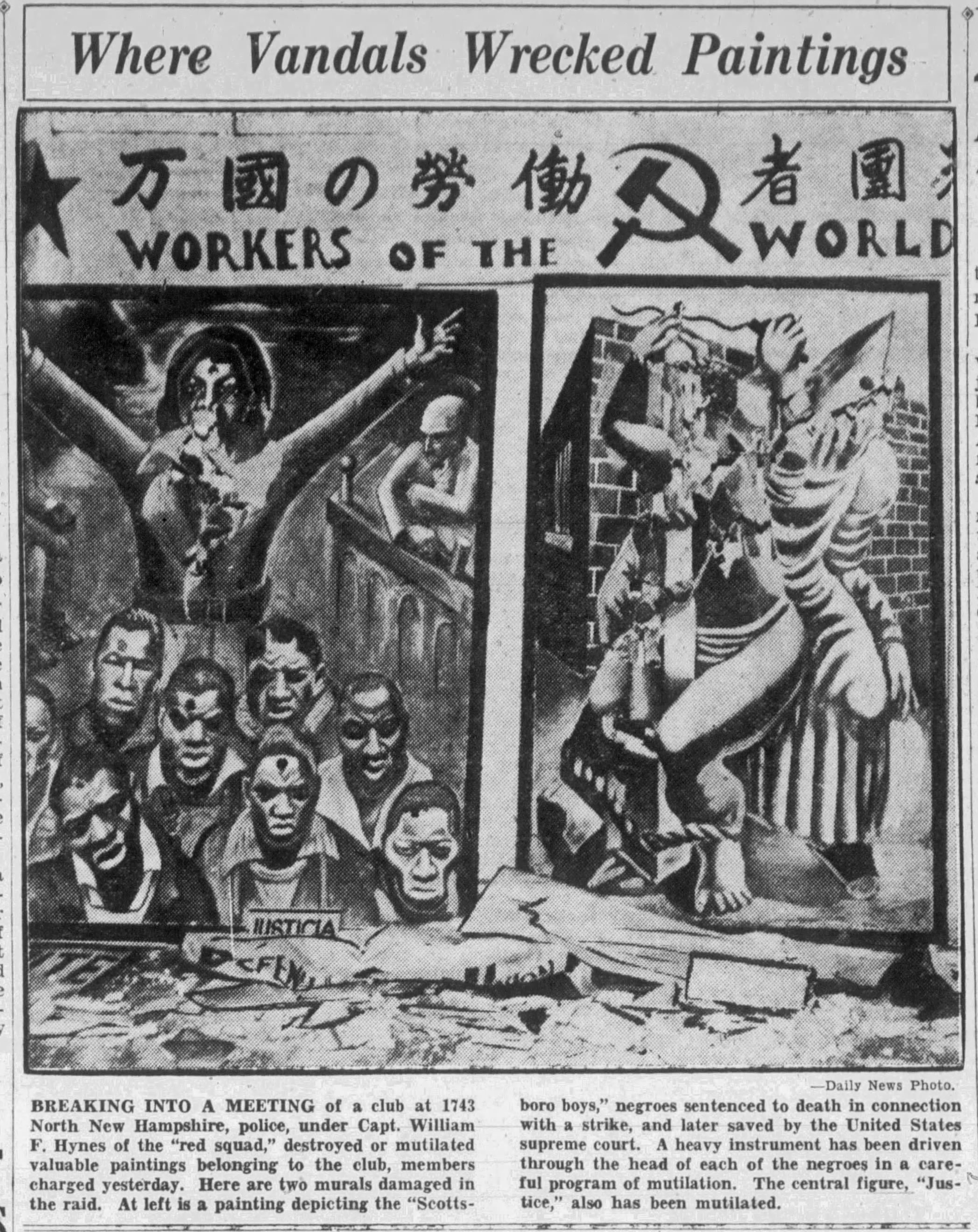
- "Where Vandals Wrecked Paintings"; Illustrated Daily News, February 13, 1933
- Date: February 11, 1933
- Location: John Reed Club (Hollywood), 1743 N. New Hampshire Avenue, Los Angeles, California, U.S.; 34.1032°N 118.2936°W

The LAPD Red Squad raid on the John Reed Club art show raid took place in Los Angeles, California, United States, on Saturday, February 11, 1933. The LAPD Red Squad, the police department's anti-radical unit, crashed a political meeting and art show hosted by a number of leftist organizations. Red Squad members destroyed several works of art in a manner that suggested racial animus as well as an anti-communist motive.

== Art show ==
The event in question was a multiracial affair at which Los Angeles leftists had gathered to publicize the plight of and to express support for the Scottsboro Boys. The sponsors were Puroretaria Geijutsu Kai (Japanese Proletarian Art Club), Rodo Shimbun, and the Horiuchi Tetsuji Japanese branch of the Los Angeles International Labor Defense. The venue was the Communist-affiliated John Reed Club in Hollywood, located at 1743 N. New Hampshire Avenue between Franklin Avenue and Hollywood Boulevard. A handbill later claimed that 450 people were guests at the event. Open Forum, the newsletter of the Los Angeles branch of the American Civil Liberties Union (ACLU), reported that 200 people were present. As the crowd moved from a theater space to an auditorium for a dance, Red Hynes and his Red Squad burst in the building, smashing doors. The police were apparently assisted by civilian gentlemen wearing American Legion caps. Hynes claimed that LAPD officers present had actually "intervened to prevent an attack by American Legionnaires".

The LAPD cleared out the building and arrested Karl Yoneda (then known as Karl Hama), who had been the evening's emcee. Loren Miller, an African-American attorney, was present at the event. According to an article about his lifetime of social activism and communist leanings, "The Club paid for a hall and the audience began to gather, 'when up steps the Red Squad and lets us know that the thing was off.' Miller had a bitter face to face confrontation with a cop afterwards who had told him to leave the scene."

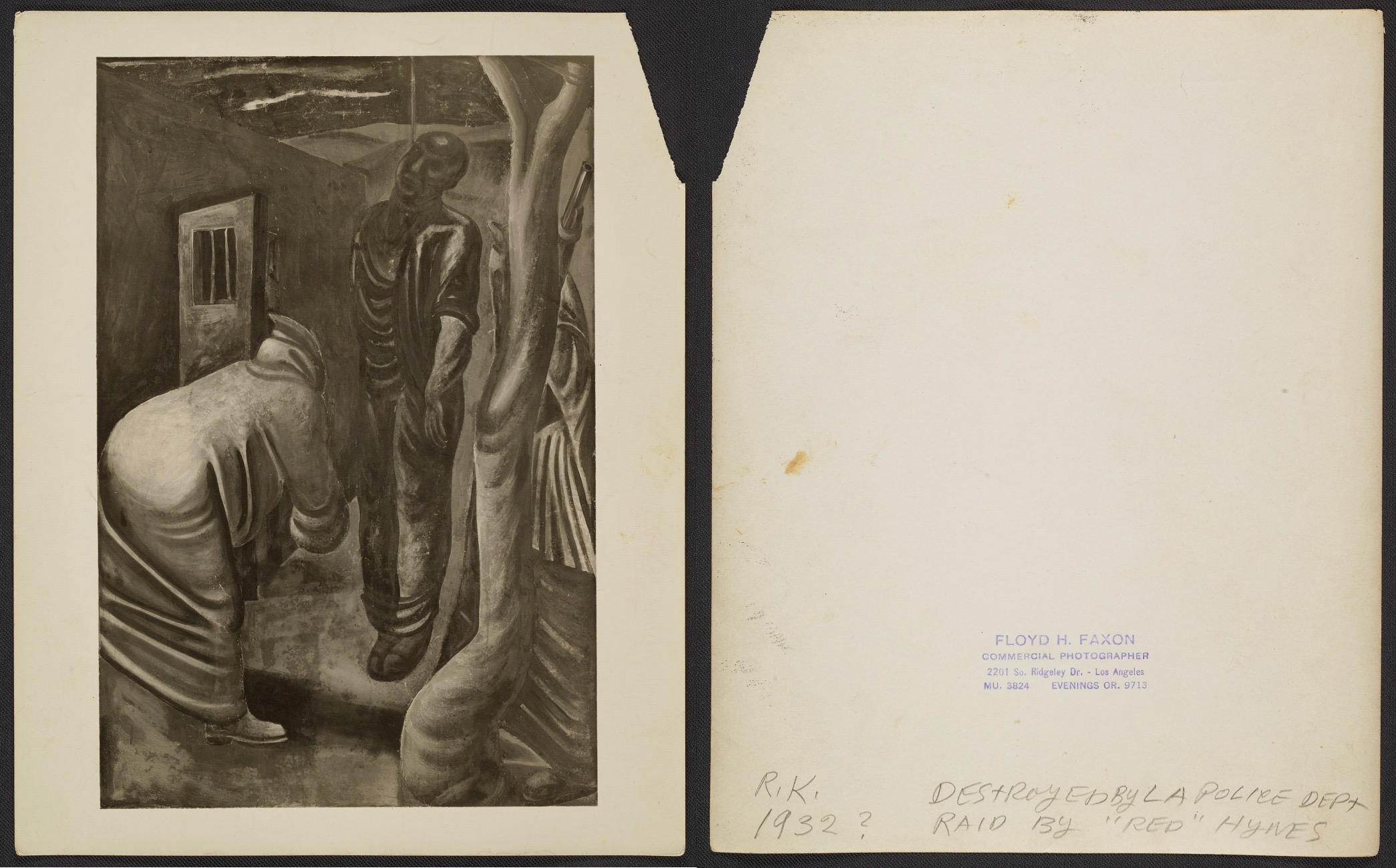
Reproduction of Reuben Kadish mural, note on verso: "R.K. 1932? Destroyed by LA police Dept Raid by 'Red' Hynes" (Smithsonian Archives of American Art 17084)

The Red Squad then turned its attention to portable "frescos on cement" created by Bloc of Painters artists Philip Guston, Reuben Kadish, Harold Lehman, Murray Hantman, and Luis Arenal for the Negro America show, which was intended to highlight the racist railroading of the Scottsboro Boys as well as other racial justice issues in the United States. The paintings were confrontational "if somewhat aesthetically unsophisticated, images deploring the recent increase in the United States of atrocities against African Americans. Among the situations pictured were a black man hanging from a tree, the whipping of an African American by a member of the Ku Klux Klan, and a rapt white audience awaiting the imminent demise of a 'boy' tied to a stake while flames licked at his feet." According to a history of Japanese-American activism during the 1930s, the Red Squad seemed "to have been especially disturbed by a mural painted by the Japanese Proletarian Art Club symbolizing cross-racial solidarity. Underneath a bilingual English-Japanese banner reading 'Workers of the World Unite' was a large painting of the Scottsboro Boys." Eyewitnesses described the Red Squad firing bullets into the foreheads of "each of the nine defendants" depicted in Murray Hantman's mural. Guston described the policemen also aiming for the genitals and eyes of the images of Alabama defendants. All told, a dozen artworks were destroyed.

== Aftermath ==
The artists and attendees were disregarded when they went to the press and the courts about the incident. The media described the Communist and leftist-aligned partygoers as "misguided individuals", and "a reactionary judge dismissed their case" when they tried to sue. When members of the John Reed Club and the Workers Ex-Service Men's League protested the raid in front of the Los Angeles City Council, the Red Squad was there to eject them, along the way taking the time to pummel lawyer Leo Gallagher, "leaving him with broken glasses and two black eyes". For their part, the Red Squad proudly claimed that the raid was a successful attack on "Japanese militarist elements". Hynes, the captain of the Red Squad, released a statement that the "so-called harmless writers and artists club the John Reed club of Hollywood is in reality just another communist tentacle, reaching into the artistic and intellectual life of Los Angeles. The so-called Japanese Press Conference, who were to hold a 'chop suey and social', are, in reality, a group of Japanese communists and the entire event was for the purpose of raising money for the Rodo Shibum, official Japanese communist newspaper published in San Francisco". In 1934, Arthur Millier, the art critic for the arch-conservative Los Angeles Times, which was owned by Harry Chandler, who was all but a personal sponsor of the Red Squad, wrote a column about anti-communist censorship. Millier argued, "There is room and need for legitimate art which shows, in their true proportion to the whole, the imperfections of society. Communist propaganda, however, has no such reasonable aim. It purposely paints a false and exaggerated picture to accomplish one end—the destruction of existing institutions. No matter how brilliant such work may sometimes be, its merit as art is no justification for its preservation."

== See also ==
- California Criminal Syndicalism Act
- América Tropical – 1932 mural by David Siqueiros
- Man at the Crossroads – 1933 mural by Diego Rivera
- Art Students League of Los Angeles
