= Luke Lane =

American municipal police officer (1893–1976)

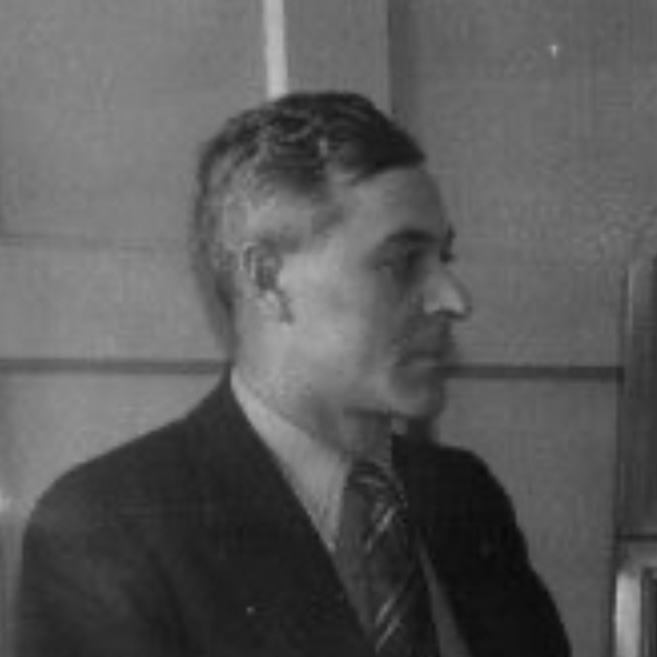
- Luke Lane, 1935, via Los Angeles Public Library
- Born: Luke Mason Lane; June 5, 1893; Maryville, Tennessee, U.S.
- Died: April 30, 1976 (aged 82); Los Angeles, California, U.S.
- Occupation: Police officer

Luke M. Lane (June 5, 1893 – April 30, 1976) was an American municipal police officer. He served on the LAPD Red Squad during the Great Depression, and has been described as having been Red Hynes's "right-hand man".

== Biography ==
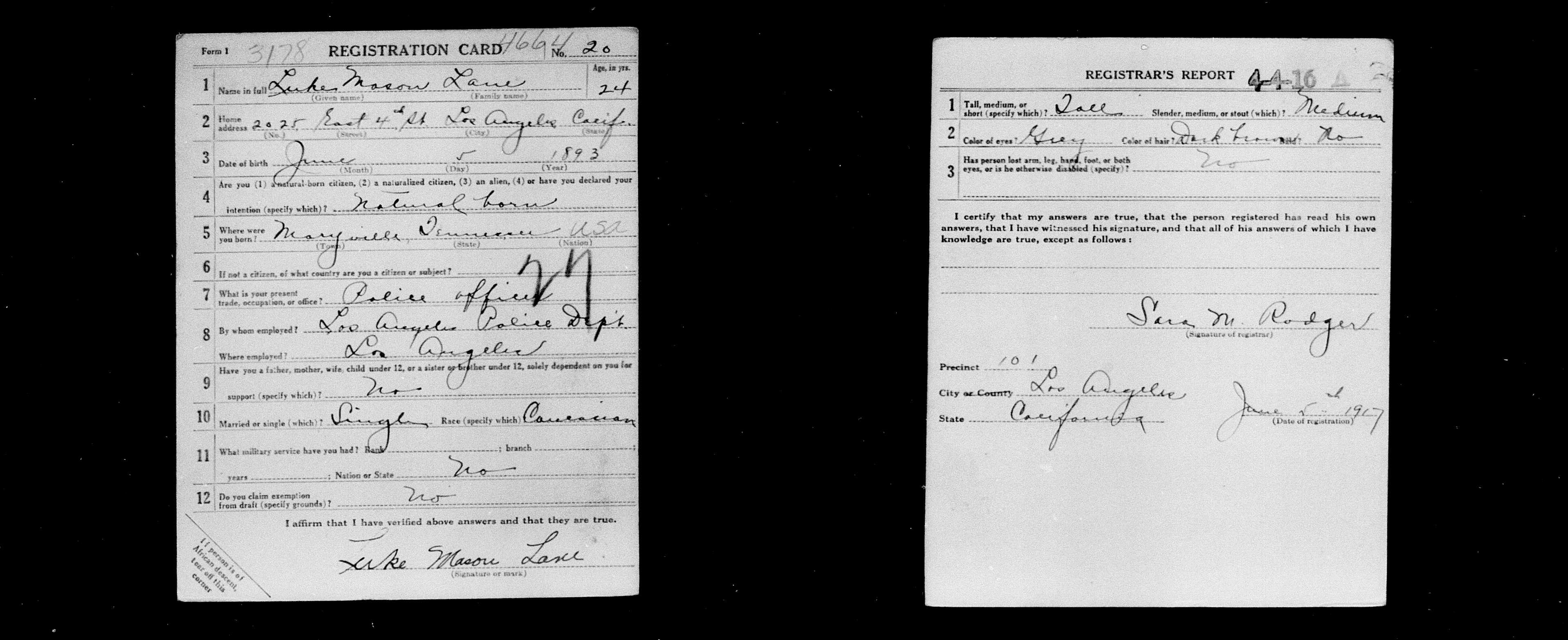
Luke Lane WWI draft registration card (1917)

Lane was born in Maryville, Tennessee. He joined the Los Angeles Police Department some time prior to 1917. Prior to the formation of the LAPD Intelligence Squad in about 1929, in 1922 Lane was involved in mass arrests of IWW union members in the lead up to what became known as the 1923 San Pedro maritime strike. The union members were charged under California's criminal syndicalism law. In December 1922 Lane was appointed commander of the newly formed unit colloquially known as the "Wobbly Squad." By 1924 Lane and William F. "Red" Hynes were authoring weekly intelligence briefs on local "strikers, labour unions, anarchists, communists, syndicalists, socialists, the ACLU, and pacifists". Under LAPD Chief of Police James E. Davis, Lane and Hynes became core members of the Intelligence Division, made up of the Red Squad and the Confidential Squad, and given "the freedom to do just about anything".

=== 1935 student peace rally ===
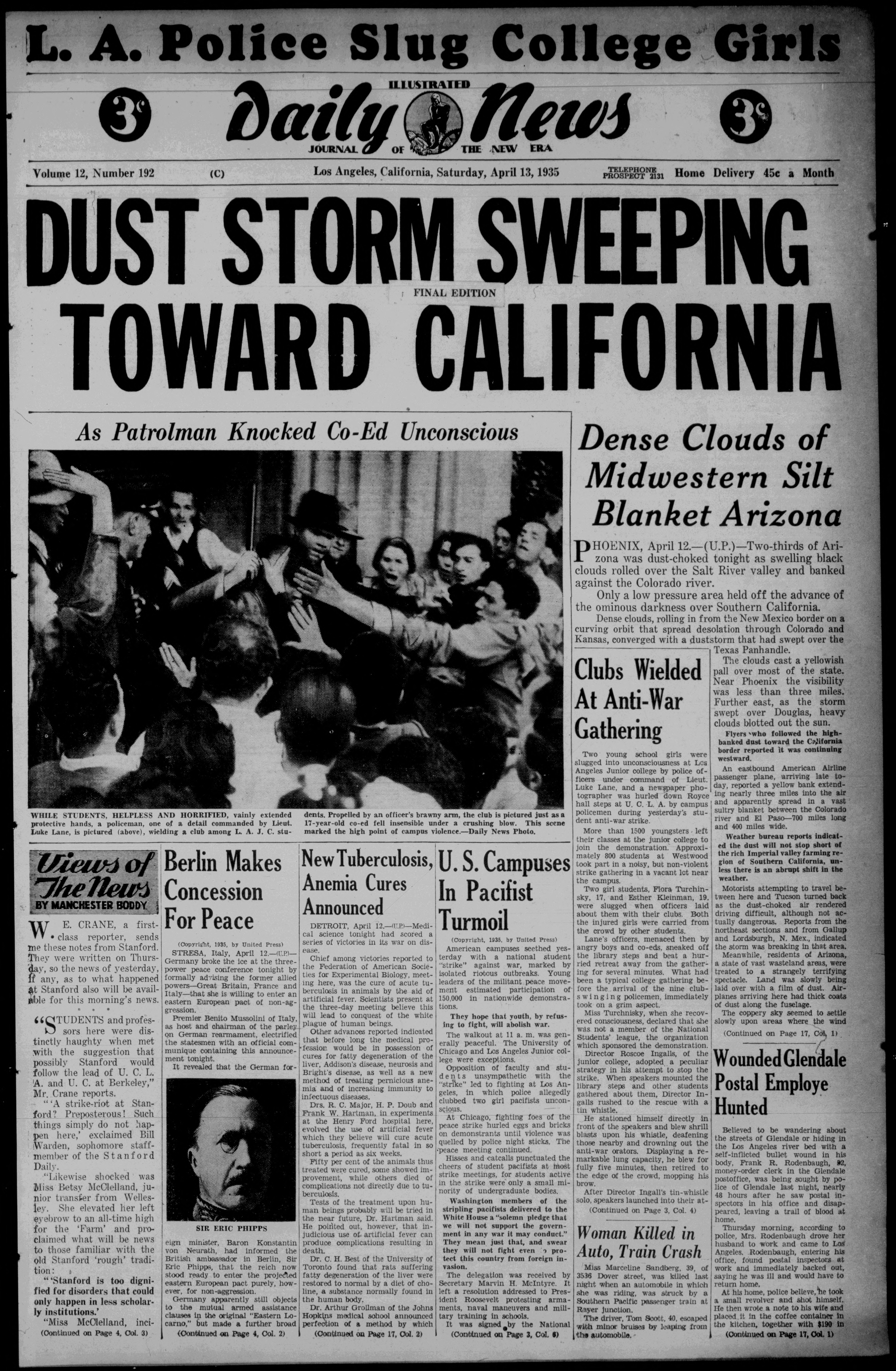
"L.A. Police Slug College Girls" (April 13, 1935)

In 1935, according to a Daily News report made under the cover-page headline "L.A. Police Slug College Girls", Lane was involved in the disruption of an anti-war protest at which "Two young school girls were slugged into unconsciousness at Los Angeles Junior College by police officers under command of Lieut. Luke Lane...Two girl students, Flora Turchinsky, 17, and Esther Kleinman, 19, were slugged when officers laid about them with their clubs...Both the injured girls were carried from the crowd by other students. Lane's officers, menaced then by angry boys and co-eds, sneaked off the library steps and beat a hurried retreat away from the gathering for several minutes. What had been a typical college gathering before the arrival of the nine club-swinging policemen, immediately took on a grim aspect. Miss Turchnisky, when she recovered consciousness, declared that she was not a member of the National Students' League, the organization which sponsored the demonstration." According to one account, she then rubbed her sore head and said, "But I'm going to join now." After the fact, "Frank Faxon, one of the club-swinging officers, said he was sorry if he was too rough; Lieutenant Lane told a newspaperman who asked him for an explanation, to 'go to hell', and Chief Davis declared that he would start an investigation." Later, a campus administrator turned on the lawn sprinklers to disperse the gathering. A long-time police-beat reporter called Norman "Jake" Jacoby told a Los Angeles media historian that when he was a student at Los Angeles Junior College, "Daily News photographer Harry Spang shot a picture of Lane's sap crashing into the girl's head...The Daily News ran the photo across six columns in the afternoon edition, but only the Daily News expressed concern about the beating."

There were a number of peace rallies happening on campuses around the country at that time, an estimated 80,000 students walked out nationwide. Stephen O'Donnell, a columnist for the Los Angeles Evening Post-Record wrote about how Stanford president Ray Lyman Wilbur was responding to similar campus actions up north:

His solution to the student pacifist strike problem will bear examination and imitation. Dr. Ray Lyman Wilbur just invited the boys and girls into the auditorium sat on the platform himself and let the student orators blast away. Some of their subjects might curl your hair, e.g. 'War Is Inherent in Capitalism'. But Dr. Ray Lyman Wilbur apparently took the point of view that this is a democratic and enlightened land and that an institution of higher learning is the proper place to discuss such matters. Clearly, Dr. Ray Lyman Wilbur is a dangerous man. It's a good thing he isn't a 17-year-old girl, or Luke Lane's plug uglies would slug him...It is here I believe that Dr. Ray Lyman Wilbur has cased the situation accurately as the boys would say around First and Hill. He has herded all the demonstrators into an auditorium and let them have their say. They will find that free speech is a hollow gift. It isn't any fun when you have it. It is only fun when you don't have it and when you are out throwing rotten eggs at somebody like Luke Lane and trying to get it."

=== Later career ===
Three months later, Chief Davis nominated "captain-by-courtesy" Lane for a promotion, to either sergeant or lieutenant. The promotion was approved by the Los Angeles Police Commission even though Lane was "at the bottom of a list of seven civil service applicants certified as having passed examinations for the position...with a passing grade of 88". In 1936, Lane told reporters that 15 "Communist colleges" were operating in California. When Hynes took a six-month leave of absence in October 1936, Lane was assigned to replace him as the acting head of the department's "anti-radical" unit. In May 1937, the American Communist newspaper Western Worker reported that Lane claimed police officers had been hired by "studios and film favorites" to escort them through SAG picket lines. Later that year liberal activists complained that their pro-employment demonstration had been disrupted by Lane and company, reporting Mayor Frank L. Shaw that, "On last Monday afternoon in downtown Los Angeles in full view of hundreds of people, Detective Lieutenant Luke Lane and about 10 members of the 'Red Squad' viciously tore the American flag and the California flag from the hands of Los Angeles citizens, ripped the flags from the standards, and crumpled and twisted them."

In October 1937, Lane was appointed to head a new anti-gambling task force. At the time of the formation of the unit, Lane was described as an "old time vice officer." In June 1938, following the conviction of LAPD officers Earl E. Kynette and Roy J. Allen on charges of conspiring to place a bomb in the car of private investigator Harry Raymond, Chief Davis officially disbanded the Intelligence Division, stating, "I have today transferred to other duties the members of the special Intelligence unit. In the future, work of this character necessary to bring about a solution of major crimes, will be supervised by Lieut. Luke Lane of the metropolitan division." A week later, local reformer Robert Noble told the Evening Citizen News that the Red Squad had not, in fact, been disbanded, just diminished, and transferred to the "Metropolitan Division under Det. Lt. Luke Lane, reported only to Chief Davis, and was continuing in their 'nefarious activities'." Six months later, after a new reform-minded mayor fired Chief Davis, there was a department-wide shakeup in which more than 200 officers were reassigned. At the time, the Los Angeles Times reported, "Luke Lane, for years special investigator personally for former Chief James E. Davis, was sent to the 77th division to work in the detective bureau." Lane retired from the force sometime before November 1941, when it was reported that while he was driving an automobile on Venice Blvd. he had hit and killed an 81-year-old man who was attempting to cross the street.

Lane's son, Harold M. Lane, was killed in an aviation accident while serving with the 93rd Bombardment Group during World War II. Luke M. Lane died in Los Angeles, California, in 1976. A California activist named Ben Dobbs was interviewed for an oral history project at UCLA in 1987 and described a man who may be Lane, recalling: "I was the representative of the Young Communist League on the executive committee, and we took part in several very, very important campaigns; the first of which was to change the political climate of Los Angeles. At that time, and for many years preceding 1934, the Los Angeles left was literally terrorized by what was known as the Red Squad. This was headed by a guy by the name of Captain Hynes and his lieutenant, whose name I've forgotten. And again, parenthetically, when I was in jail I met the son of that lieutenant—I'll think of his name sooner or later—and he told us that he brutalized his family in the same way he brutalized the left-wing movement. But anyway, that's the end of that parenthesis."

== See also ==
- LAPD Red Squad raid on John Reed Club art show
- Eva Shafran – American Communist (1906–1944)
- 1938 Los Angeles mayoral recall election
