= Mark A. Pierce =

American businessman (1896–1959)

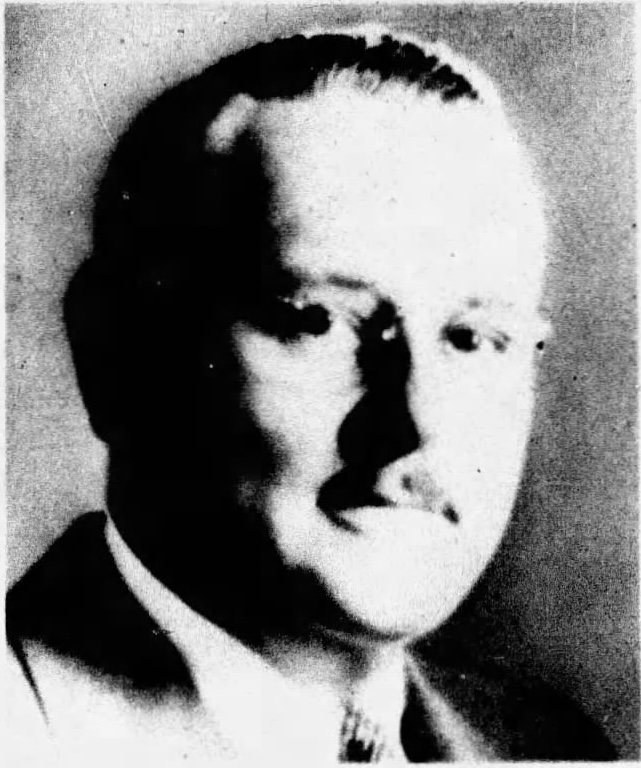
- Pierce in 1937

Member of the California State Assembly from the 75th district
- In office January 5, 1925 – January 3, 1927
- Preceded by: Edwin T. Baker
- Succeeded by: George W. Rochester

Personal details
- Born: March 6, 1896 Los Angeles, California, US
- Died: April 11, 1959 (aged 63) Santa Barbara, California, US
- Party: Republican

Military service
- Branch/service: United States Army
- Battles/wars: World War I

Mark Alfred Pierce (March 6, 1896 – April 11, 1959) was an American business executive who ran his family's company, Pierce Brothers Mortuary Services, for many years. He was also a one-term California State Assemblyman, and one-term Los Angeles Police Commissioner.

== Early life ==
Pierce was the son of Fred E. Pierce, one of the founders of Pierce Brothers Mortuary Services. He served overseas during World War I in the United States Army.

== Political career ==
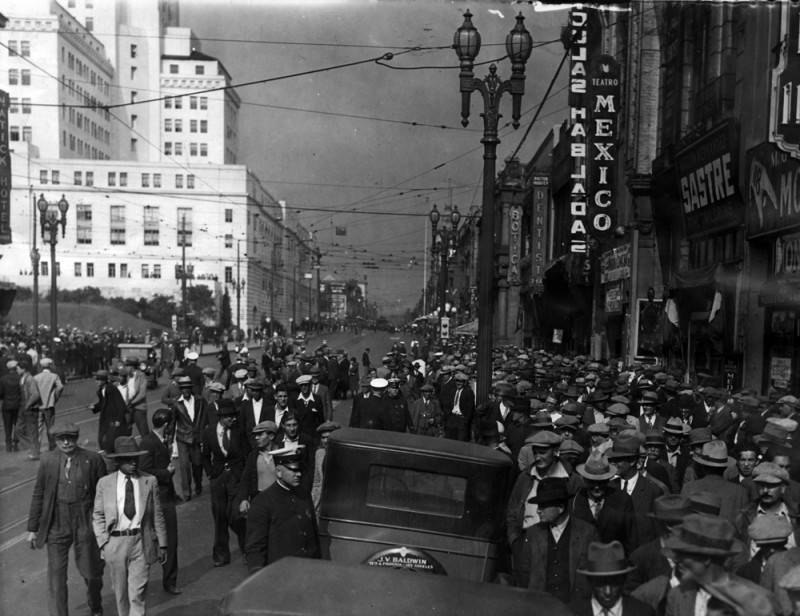
Los Angeles police monitor a crowd at a Communist demonstration on Main Street, 1930

In 1924 Pierce ran for Assembly as a Republican candidate and was endorsed by Ralph V. Blakeslee. Pierce served in the California State Assembly from the 75th district from 1925 to 1927. While in office he earned the ire of the Los Angeles Record editorial board for his vote opposing the metropolitan water district bill. Pierce was defeated for re-election by George W. Rochester.

Pierce was appointed to a seat on the Los Angeles Police Commission in 1928, replacing Harry E. Insley. Pierce resigned in March 1930, and Major Thomas Walkup was appointed as his replacement. A week after he had officially resigned, Pierce attended a police commission meeting regarding LAPD Red Squad raids preceding and following an unemployment protest on March 6, 1930. In the course of the verbal conflict between regional ACLU director Clinton J. Taft, ACLU attorney Leo Gallagher, commissioner Edgar Wehn, commissioner Francis Drake, commissioner Clarence E. Coe, commissioner Willard Thorpe, acting captain Red Hynes, and others, Taft mentioned a raid on a Communist office, at which time Pierce declared:

The more the police beat them up and wreck their headquarters, the better. Communists have no constitutional rights, and I won't listen to anybody who defends them.

This statement, which came with Pierce "patting Hynes jovially on the back," has been repeatedly quoted in histories of the era as a succinct summary of the lawlessness of the Los Angeles ruling class during this era.

== Post-political career ==
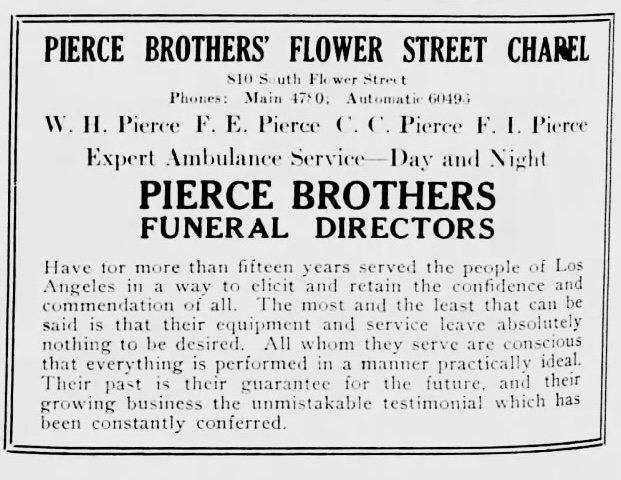
Pierce Brothers Flower Street chapel ad, 1920

In 1935, while on a world tour, he was detained by Japanese authorities for 11 days on suspicion of being a spy, after he photographed a Japanese cruiser and fortified islands in the Strait of Shimonsheki. He was allowed to stay in a hotel and go out for meals but was interrogated via interpreter for hours a day by Kobe police the rest of the time. His stay in Japan was apparently extended because his luggage included evidence that he had been appointed a Kentucky Colonel, which the Japanese presumed to be a legitimate military rank rather than a paper-only honorary title. One columnist commented that the experience must have been "a revealing one" to a former member of the police commission.

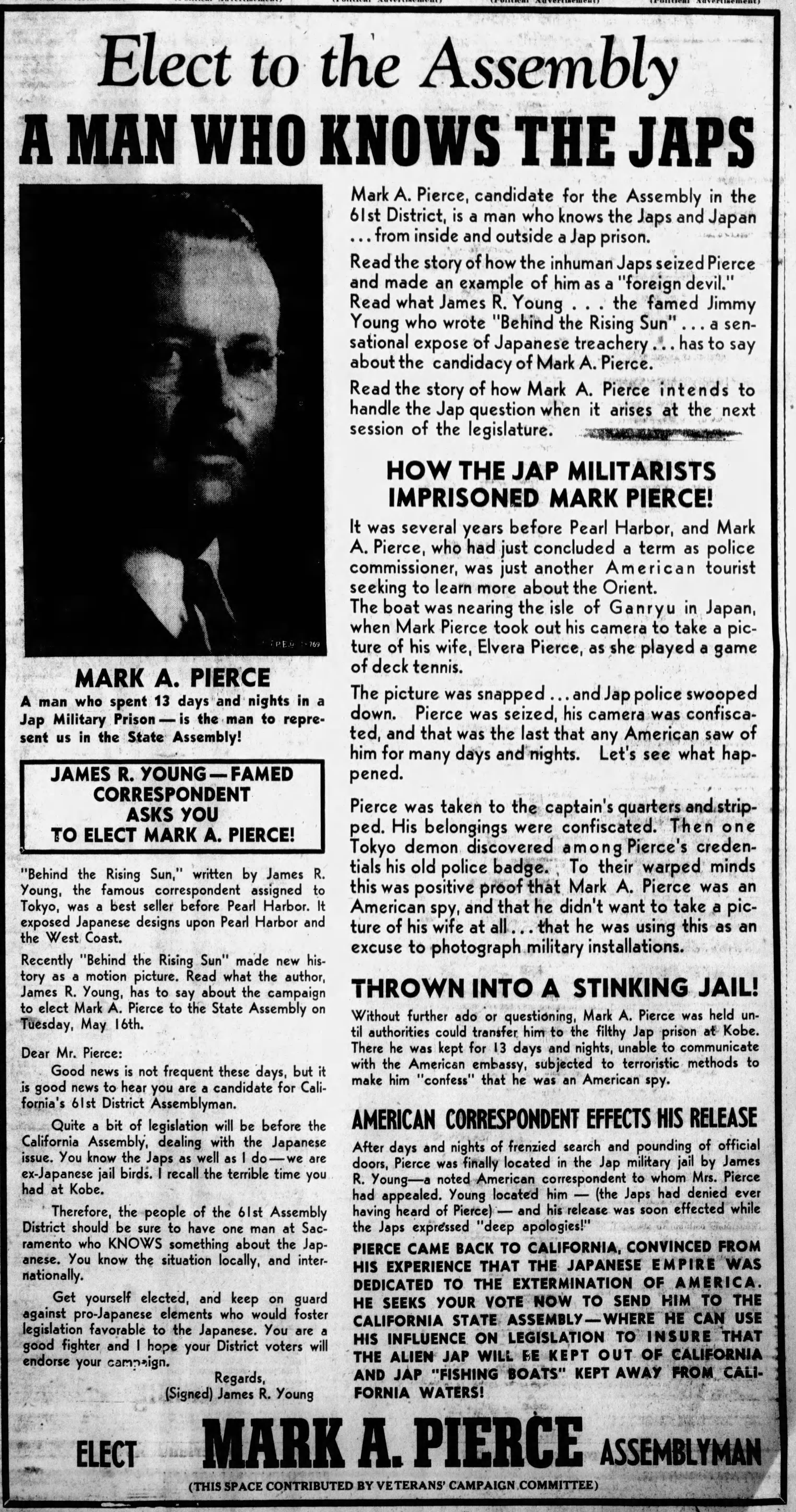
"Elect to the Assembly a Man Who Knows the Japs" Culver City Evening Star-News, May 5, 1944

As of 1938 he was general manager of Pierce Brothers mortuary. In 1940 he was appointed to the board of directors of Chapman College. In 1944 he was again a candidate for State Assembly, this time from the 61st district, Pierce cited his experience being "thrown into a stinking jail" in Japan in 1935 as a qualifying credential for election to office during the Pacific War. In the 1950s, he ended his career as the company's chairman of the board. When Pierce died in Santa Barbara in 1959, he was principal shareholder of Pierce Brothers Mortuary, which had recently been sold, along with three affiliated companies.

== See also ==
- Pierce Brothers Westwood Village Memorial Park and Mortuary
- Pierce Brothers Valhalla Memorial Park Cemetery
