= LAPD Red Squad =

Municipal secret police

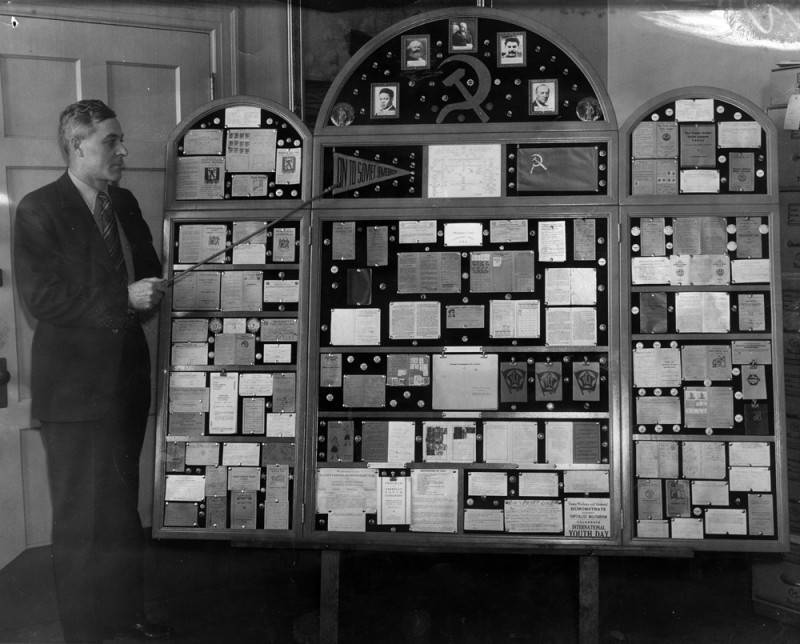
LAPD captain Luke Lane with a board of "communistic literature" seized during Red Squad raids (Los Angeles Herald-Examiner photograph, 1935, via Los Angeles Public Library photo archive)

The LAPD Red Squad is the common name for a division of the municipal Los Angeles Police Department, in California, United States, that was focused on limiting the activities of left-wing individuals and organizations in the city. Over the course of 50 years, LAPD "gathered some 2 million secret files...on all manner of legitimate dissenters."

== 1920s–1930s ==
The immediate predecessor to the Red Squad was the LAPD War Squad, created in 1918. The War Squad was charged with investigating "spies, terrorists, labor disturbers and hostile aliens". The department's first Red Squad, formally the LAPD Intelligence Division, operated from approximately 1929 when it was organized by chief of police Roy E. Steckel, until June 22, 1938, when it was disbanded under chief of police James E. Davis. The "anti-radical" section of the Intelligence division was widely known as the Red Squad, and was one of a number of red squads operating during the interwar period in Canada and the United States. Key figures included Red Hynes, Luke Lane, and Earl E. Kynette, who ran what was considered the "confidential" section of the squad, also known as the "spy squad". As one artist later summarized the organization's actions of the late 1920s and 1930s: "Red Hynes' 'red squads' were running rampant, raiding union headquarters and homes, and creating havoc among the liberals." A succinct summary of the distinction between the two squads: "The department was internationally notorious for its strike-breaking 'Red Squad' and its quasi-KGB 'Confidential Squad'." The LAPD Red Squad was shut down following the convictions of Kynette and Roy Allen for attempting to assassinate a civil reform advocate via a car bomb.

Historian Frank Donner wrote in 1990, "In Los Angeles, however, more than in any other city in the country, the role of the police department and its red squad as clients of business interests in combating dissent and unionism was from the start openly proclaimed and was implemented over the years with only minimal concessions to changes in political climate, accountability requirements, reform movements, recurring corruption scandals, and adverse court decisions...all of the red squads were guided by highly conservative political values, but in Los Angeles right-wing zealotry reigned supreme."

A semi-official departmental history published in the Los Angeles Police Department yearbook of 1984 stated that Red Hynes was one of the "most potent force[s] in the Police Department and city in those years". The Red Squad consistently used physical violence and civil-rights violations to achieve its goals; per LAPD historian Arthur W. Sjoquist, "Today these actions would be reprehensible, but in the 1930s the mood was different...As one [LAPD] Commissioner [Mark A. Pierce] put it, 'The more the police beat them up and wreck their headquarters, the better...Communists have no constitutional rights and I won't listen to anyone who defends them'."

In 2026 a Marxist Library edition of What Is to Be Done? by Vladimir Lenin that had once been in the libraries of LAPD's Public Disorder Intelligence Division and the Anti-Terrorist Division was featured on the Los Angeles Public Library's social media channels.

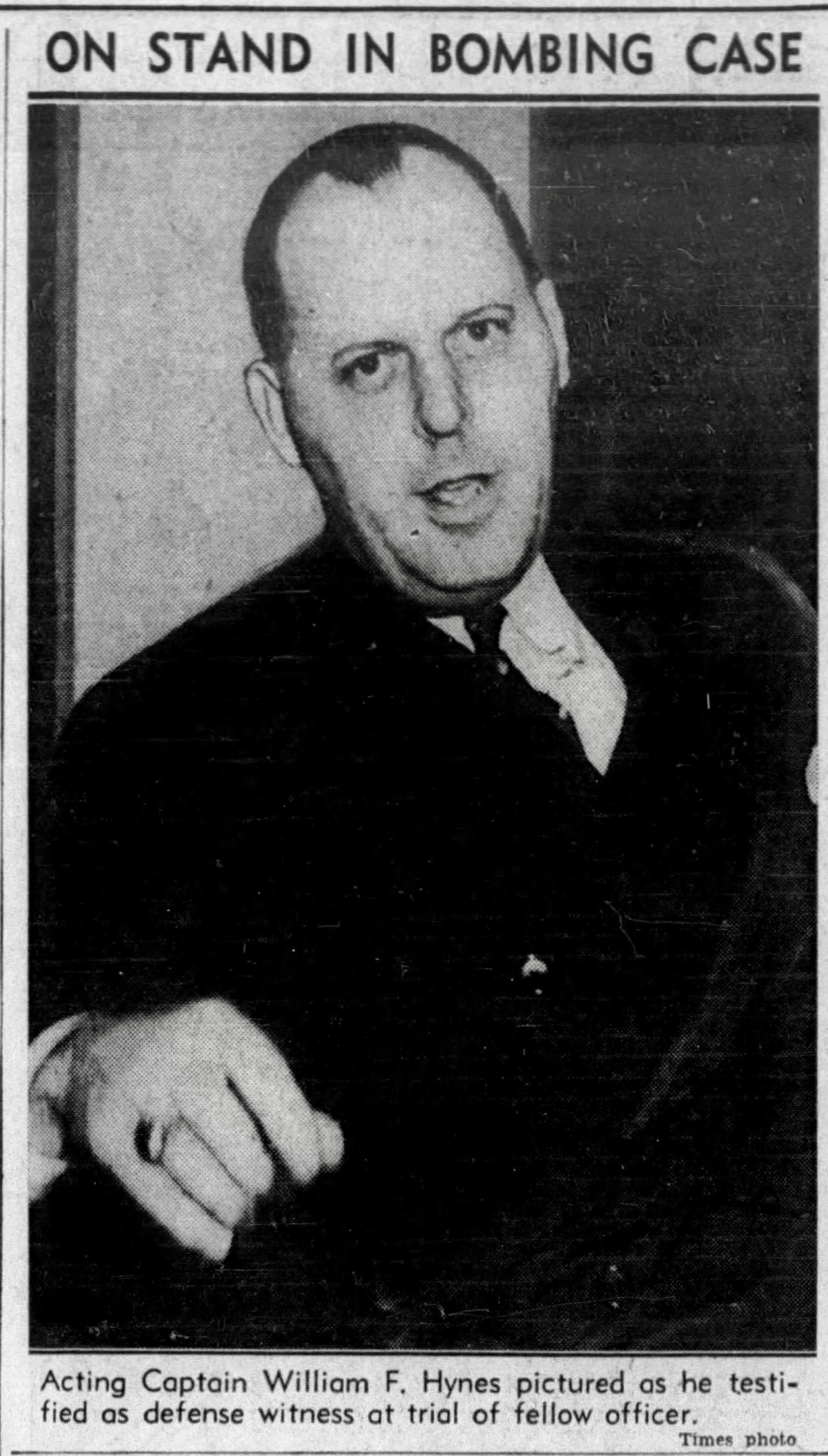
Red Hynes testified for the defense at the criminal trial of fellow Intelligence Squad officers Earl Kynette and Roy Allen, who were charged with conspiracy to plant a bomb in Harry Raymond's car (Los Angeles Times, May 24, 1938)

=== Intelligence collection ===
Chief James E. Davis created a dossier on the Mexican consul, Ricardo Hill, whom city business leaders held responsible for agricultural labor strikes involving Mexican and Mexican-American laborers associated with the union CUCOM (Confederación de Unión Campesinos y Obreros Mexicanos). Davis used material "from the red squad's already extensive file on Hill and added information from the files of the Associated Farmers of Los Angeles and Orange Counties and from the Los Angeles County sheriff's office. He compiled the information into a report, which was included in an official protest from the statewide Associated Farmers' organization to the United States State Department". According to historian Edward J. Escobar, when the Mexican government removed Hill as consul in October 1936, it was not because of the contents of dossier but because the very act of its creation and distribution was evidence of "manifest hostility" from LAPD.

=== Use of violence ===
The LAPD Red Squad of the Great Depression era appears to have routinely used physical violence as a means of intimidation and repression. The Red Squad under Davis and Hynes found that "simple intimidation or a good beating could get the job done" as effectively as arrest, prosecution, and incarceration, without all the time-consuming paperwork and procedure. For instance, during a Los Angeles City Council meeting, the Red Squad attacked leftists present to protest against the LAPD Red Squad raid on the John Reed Club art show, beating ACLU president Clinton J. Taft, two war veterans, and attorney Leo Gallagher, "leaving him with broken glasses and two black eyes". Nieces of Chicano union activist Jesús "Uncle Chuey" Cruz told a historian with the University of Arizona that when their uncle was involved with the California agricultural strikes of 1933, "They hired the Red Squad from Los Angeles to quell that rebellion. They beat the hell out of him. They cracked his head open several times...Boy, they treated him so bad [that] they made a Communist out of him". Communist teacher Eva Shafran was reportedly jumped by one or more members of the Red Squad, knocked unconscious with an automobile crank, kicked in the mouth knocking out her front teeth, and was seriously injured to the point that she was sent to a sanitarium to recover. In 1935, officers under command of Luke Lane used their blackjacks to beat two college students unconscious at a peace rally. According to a group biography of the leftist Brooks family of California held at the Southern California Library for Social Studies and Research, "In 1932, Isador [Brooks] was arrested by...William F. Hynes' Red Squad. He was so severely beaten by them that it permanently affected his health and he died two years later." Socialist organizer and Methodist minister Rev. Ward H. Rodgers sued Red Squad officer Carl Abbott for punching him in the face "without provocation" during the 1936 Venice celery strike.

'Red' squads develop a strong urge to act regardless of the necessity or lack of necessity for action.

— "Trouble Makers" Los Angeles Evening Citizen News, May 4, 1936

== 1960s–1970s ==
In the 1970s the Red Squad was known as the LAPD Public Disorder Intelligence Division. In 1982 the LAPD agreed to pay Seymour Myerson $27,500 to settle a lawsuit charging them with political spying and harassment. As part of a larger reform program, the department agreed to destroy their files on dissenters, except as of 1983, PDID "was still keeping tabs on more than 200 organizations, including the Coalition Against Police Abuse and Citizens Commission on Police Repression."

== See also ==
- History of the Los Angeles Police Department
- LAPD Gangster Squad
- Strikes in the United States in the 1930s
- California Criminal Syndicalism Act
- 1938 Los Angeles mayoral recall election
- Guy McAfee – American businessman (1888–1960)
- Bob Gans – American businessman (1887–1959)
- "The Lid Off Los Angeles"
- Western Goals Foundation
