= Leo Gallagher (lawyer) =

U.S. leftist attorney (1887–1963)

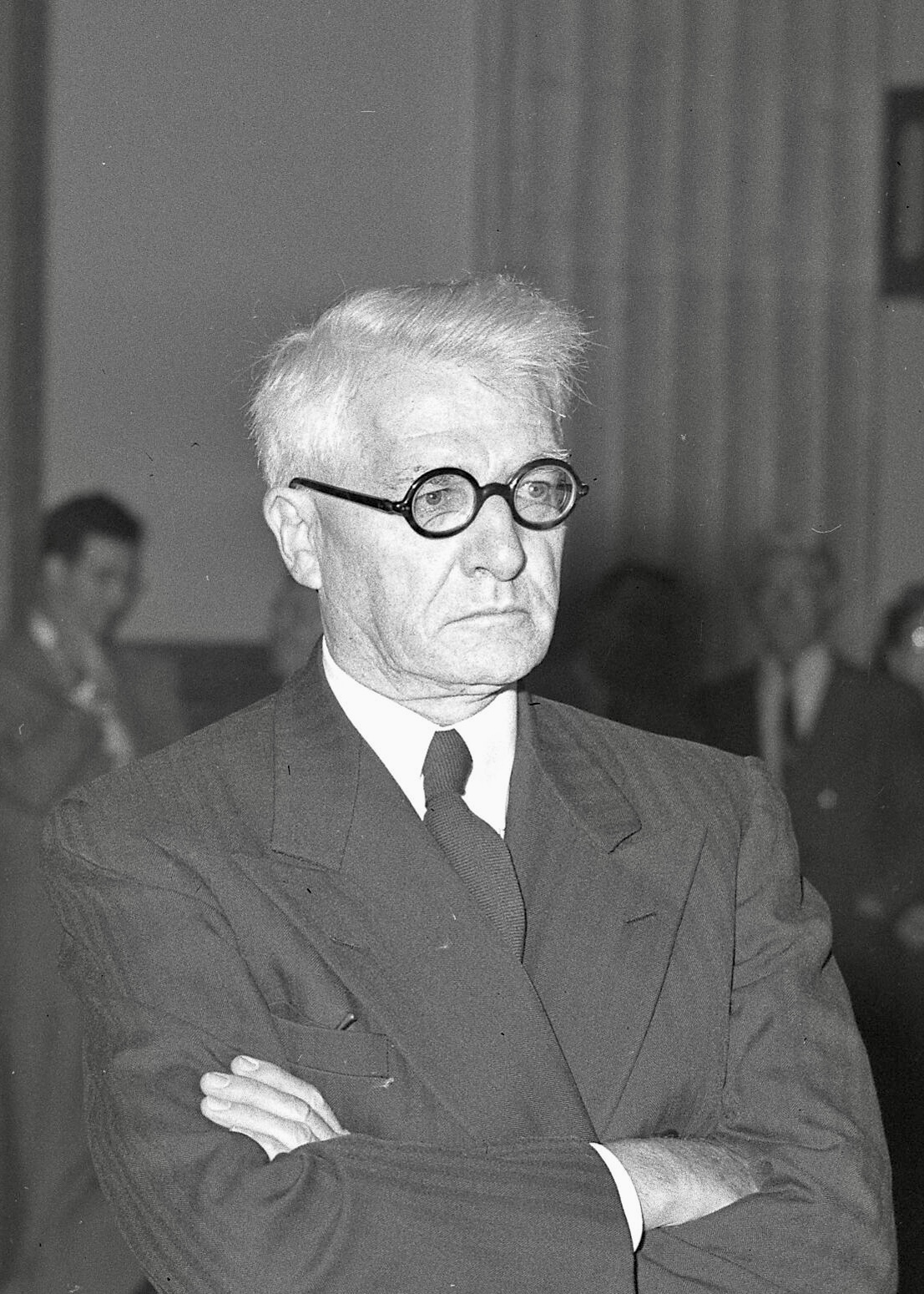
- Born: July 11, 1887; Kansas, U.S.
- Died: September 28, 1963 (aged 76); Norwalk, Los Angeles County, California, U.S.

Leo Gallagher (July 11, 1887 – September 28, 1963) was an American attorney and perennial non-successful leftist candidate for office in California. Gallagher was an important figure in the civil liberties and labor movements in early 20th-century Southern California.

== Biography ==
Gallagher was born in 1887 in Kansas.

According to his obituary in the Los Angeles Times, "He was a member of the staff of lawyers that defended suspects in Germany's famous Reichstag fire in 1933 that boosted Hitler to power." In October 1933, Gallagher, a French lawyer, Willard, and two Bulgarian lawyers, Grigoroff and Detcheff, were removed from the trial and taken to police headquarters in Berlin. In 1934 he criticized California district attorney Neil R. McAllister for releasing "letters seized in a police raid on the apartment of Caroline Decker and Jack Warnick which linked the name of James Cagney to the Communist movement."

He was also a perennial opponent of the LAPD Red Squad. The Red Squad protested his protest, in the Los Angeles City Council chambers, of their vandalistic raid on John Reed Club art show by giving him two black eyes and broken glasses.

He ran for California Secretary of State in 1938 on the Communist Party ticket. His name reportedly came up annually in Un-American Activities Committee reports at the state and federal levels. He was partners at one time with A. L. Wirin, chief counsel of the ACLU.

He was a Democratic hopeful for the U.S. Senate in 1954.

Gallagher died after an illness of 18 months in a hospital in Norwalk, California in 1963.

== See also ==
- Mark A. Pierce – American businessman (1896–1959)

== Sources ==
- Stevens, Errol Wayne (2021). In Pursuit of Utopia: Los Angeles in the Great Depression. Norman, Oklahoma: University of Oklahoma Press. ISBN 978-0-8061-6924-8. LCCN 2020053112. OCLC 1226076500.
