= Marie Waldron =

American politician (born 1960)

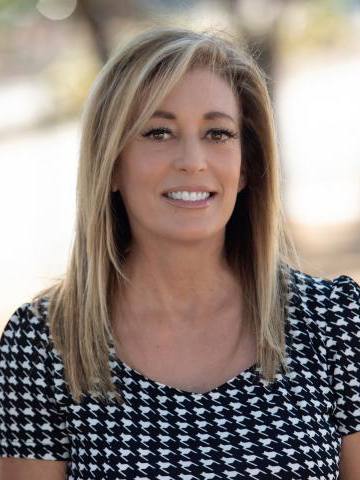
- Official portrait, 2022

Minority Leader of the California Assembly
- In office November 8, 2018 – February 8, 2022
- Preceded by: Brian Dahle
- Succeeded by: James Gallagher

Member of the California State Assembly from the 75th district
- In office December 3, 2012 – November 30, 2024
- Preceded by: Nathan Fletcher
- Succeeded by: Carl DeMaio

Personal details
- Born: Marie P. McGowan; March 28, 1960 (age 66) New York City, New York, U.S.
- Party: Republican
- Children: 1
- Education: St. John's University, New York (BS); San Diego State University; University of California, San Diego (GrCert)

Marie Waldron (born March 28, 1960) is an American politician from California. Waldron was a member of the California State Assembly from 2012 to 2024, and served as the Assembly minority leader from 2018 until 2022. Waldron was a Republican member of the California State Assembly and represented District 75, encompassing parts of inland central and eastern San Diego County, including Ramona, Poway, Santee, and Alpine.

== Early life and education ==
Waldron was born in New York City, New York. She earned a Bachelor of Science degree in Athletic Administration and Communications from St. John's University. Waldron attended San Diego State University and the University of California, San Diego.

== Career ==
A business owner, Waldron owns Waldron Enterprises LLC and Top End Tees Screenprinting & Driving Styles Apparel. Waldron's political career began when she became member of the Escondido City Council. In 2002, Waldron served as a vice mayor until 2005. Waldron served the city council until 2012.

On November 6, 2012, Waldron won the election and became a Republican member of California State Assembly for District 75. Waldron defeated Matthew Herold with 62.7% of the votes. On November 4, 2014, as an incumbent, Waldron won the election and continued serving District 75. Waldron defeated Nicholas Shestople with 69% of the votes. On November 8, 2016, as an incumbent, Waldron won the election and continued serving District 75. Waldron defeated Andrew Masiel Sr. with 62.9% of the votes. On November 6, 2018, as an incumbent, Waldron won the election and continued serving District 75. Waldron defeated Alan Geraci with 56.4% of the votes.

On November 8, 2018, she was elected by her Assembly Republican colleagues to serve as Assembly minority leader.

In 2022, redistricting combined her district with that of fellow Assemblyman Randy Voepel. Waldron won by a wide margin.

Waldron is a founding member of the San Diego chapter of California Women's Leadership Association known as CWLA.

== Election history ==
=== 2014 California State Assembly ===
California's 75th State Assembly district election, 2014
Primary election
Party	Candidate	Votes	%
Republican	Marie Waldron (incumbent)	41,510	99.1
Democratic	Nicholas Shestople (write-in)	375	0.9
Libertarian	Mike Paster (write-in)	14	0.0
Total votes		41,899	100.0
General election
Republican	Marie Waldron (incumbent)	66,152	69.0
Democratic	Nicholas Shestople	29,761	31.0
Total votes		95,913	100.0
Republican hold			

=== 2016 California State Assembly ===
California's 75th State Assembly district election, 2016
Primary election
Party	Candidate	Votes	%
Republican	Marie Waldron (incumbent)	56,407	60.3
Democratic	Andrew Masiel Sr.	37,104	39.7
Total votes		93,511	100.0
General election
Republican	Marie Waldron (incumbent)	111,598	62.9
Democratic	Andrew Masiel Sr.	65,770	37.1
Total votes		177,368	100.0
Republican hold			

=== 2018 California State Assembly ===
California's 75th State Assembly district election, 2018
Primary election
Party	Candidate	Votes	%
Republican	Marie Waldron (incumbent)	56,646	61.6
Democratic	Alan Geraci	35,324	38.4
Total votes		91,970	100.0
General election
Republican	Marie Waldron (incumbent)	95,236	56.4
Democratic	Alan Geraci	73,707	43.6
Total votes		168,943	100.0
Republican hold			

=== 2020 California State Assembly ===
2020 California's 75th State Assembly district election
Primary election
Party	Candidate	Votes	%
Republican	Marie Waldron (incumbent)	71,057	56.3
Democratic	Karen "Kate" Schwartz	47,851	37.9
Democratic	Roger Garcia	7,288	5.8
Total votes		126,196	100.0
General election
Republican	Marie Waldron (incumbent)	128,559	54.5
Democratic	Karen "Kate" Schwartz	107,150	45.5
Total votes		235,709	100.0
Republican hold			

=== 2022 California State Assembly ===
2022 California's 75th State Assembly district election
Primary election
Party	Candidate	Votes	%
Republican	Marie Waldron (incumbent)	59,612	63.5
Republican	Randy Voepel (incumbent)	34,328	36.5
Total votes		93,940	100.0
General election
Republican	Marie Waldron (incumbent)		
Republican	Randy Voepel (incumbent)		
Total votes			
Republican hold			

== Personal life ==
Waldron lives in Valley Center, California.

California Assembly
Preceded by Brian Dahle	Minority Leader of the California Assembly; 2018–2022	Succeeded by Jamie Gallagher
