= Edwin T. Baker =

American politician

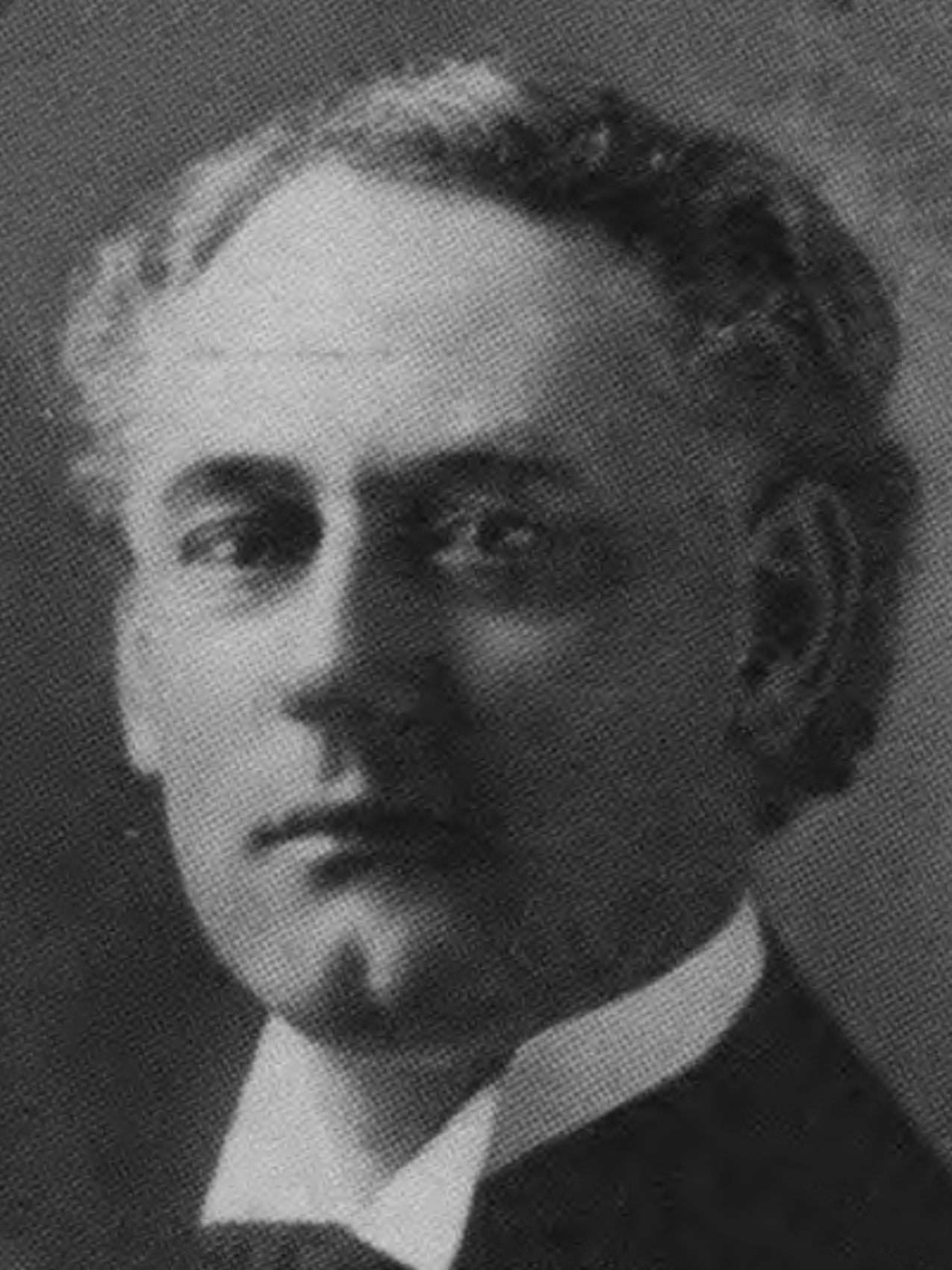

Member of the California State Assembly from the 75th district
- In office January 8, 1917 – January 5, 1925
- Preceded by: James Stuart McKnight
- Succeeded by: Mark A. Pierce

Personal details
- Born: February 11, 1873 Oakland, Maryland, US
- Died: July 22, 1936 (aged 63) Los Angeles, California
- Party: Republican
- Spouse: Henrietta Crawford (m. 1902)
- Children: 1
- Education: Georgetown University; American University

Edwin T. Baker (February 11, 1873 – July 22, 1936) was a tax adviser, a government employee, a member of the California Legislature and of the Los Angeles City Council and he was active in the theater. He was U.S. collector of customs in Nogales, Arizona, from which position he was discharged because of alleged "immorality."

== Personal ==
Baker was born in Oakland, Maryland, on February 11, 1873, the son of William Henry Baker of Virginia. In 1897, Edwin Baker received a Bachelor of Science degree from Georgetown University in Washington, D.C., and later did postgraduate work in tax counseling at American University in that city.

He was married in June 1902 to Henrietta Crawford of Washington, D.C. The family moved to Los Angeles in 1906 or 1908. They had a child, Edwin K. (Eddie) Baker, who became one of the original members of the Keystone Cops.

Baker was for a time the secretary of the California Taxpayers Association. He was a member of the Friday Morning Club and of Al Malaikah Shrine, and in 1909 he was president of the Southwest Improvement Association in the Vermont Square, Los Angeles, neighborhood.

Baker died on July 22, 1936, at the age of 63 in his home at 361 North Croft Avenue in Beverly Grove, Los Angeles, and was buried in Forest Lawn Memorial Park, Glendale, after services at the West Hollywood Baptist Church.

== Vocation ==
Baker worked for the U.S. Pension Office in Washington, D.C., while attending graduate school. In 1905–06 Baker was collector of customs in Nogales, Arizona, where he was noted for helping to forestall the entry into the United States of two young Chinese women who were presumably destined to travel to San Francisco where they would have become prostitutes.

After moving to Los Angeles he was in private business, and he was a California Assembly member from the 75th District for eight years (1921–23); he did not run for reelection. He was a Los Angeles City Council member for two years (1924–26).

Baker worked in both amateur and professional theater. After graduation from college he was in a stock company in New York State, and he was later stage manager for the Pilgrimage Play Theater in the Cahuenga Pass, Los Angeles, for five years.

After he left public service in 1926 he was a realty broker and a tax counselor, but when California adopted a sales tax Governor James Ralph appointed him in 1933 to the sales tax division of the State Board of Equalization, where he served until he died.

== Assembly actions ==
- In 1923 he introduced a constitutional amendment that would have done away with the 30-day recess by the Legislature that marked the midpoint of a legislative session and was supposed to be used for consultation with constituents. Baker said the recess was costly and was "useless" as a precaution against bad legislation.
- He introduced a bill that would redistrict the Legislature to give Southern California more seats in keeping with its increased population during the preceding ten years.
- Baker was the proponent of the publication of a California Blue Book, which contained the names of all state officials and other information about the state and was "similar to blue books issued by other State governments." His first bill was vetoed by Governor William Stephens but a later one was approved by Governor Friend Richardson.

== Suicide of friend ==
Baker was dismissed from his customs position in Nogales, Arizona, as a result of a series of incidents that began in December 1905 with the suicide of a friend, Charles J. Notter, in Los Angeles while Baker was out on a buggy ride with Notter's wife. When they returned, Mrs. Notter found her husband's body, dead, with a bullet in the heart. Baker and Mrs. Notter each told authorities that Notter had "brooded" and killed himself over money worries because he had lost a fortune when they were all living together in Nogales. A Bisbee, Arizona, newspaper reported later that the suicide "is said to be due to Baker's friendship for the wife."

In late January, two "special inspectors" arrived in Nogales to investigate. Baker said he offered his resignation as collector of customs but it was refused, and in early February 1906 it was announced that he had been "summarily removed" from the office on a charge of "immorality." Baker said he "absolutely" denied that his "relations with the family were other than a true friend of both." He said the removal was caused by political enemies who had been after his job.

Two months later, in April 1906, the Los Angeles Times, under a headline that read "Fired for Wearing Mask?" reported from Douglas, Arizona, that:

Sensational in the extreme are the stories current incidental to the removal of Edwin Baker as customs collector at Nogales, whose affairs have been subjected to the scrutiny of Inspector Ayers of the Treasury Department for several days past.

It is alleged that shortly before Baker was succeeded by McCord, a Secret Service man, endeavoring to place his hands on a diamond smuggler, was thunderstruck to tear off a heavy false beard which revealed the wearer to be none other than the collector of customs himself.

It is said that Baker succeeded in dissipating the diamond-smuggling story, but in doing so was also obliged to disclose a house on the Mexican side of the line where he had fitted up a harem after Turkish style. He had three "housekeepers."
