= Emory J. Arnold =

American politician

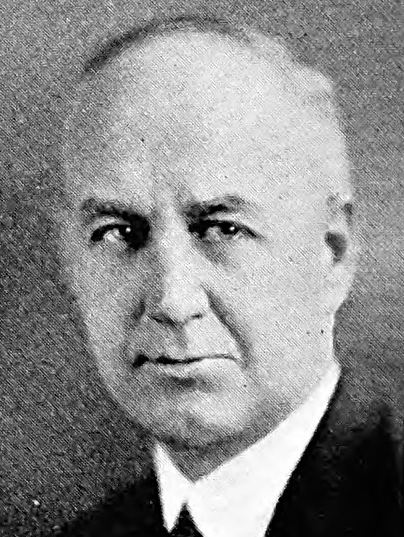

Member of the California State Assembly
- In office January 7, 1929 – January 2, 1933
- Preceded by: George W. Rochester
- Succeeded by: Willard E. Badham
- Constituency: 75th district (1929–1931); 63rd district (1929–1933)

Personal details
- Born: February 15, 1888 Butte, Montana, US
- Died: April 23, 1955 (aged 67) Los Angeles, California, US
- Party: Republican

Military service
- Branch/service: United States Army
- Battles/wars: World War I

Emory J. Arnold (February 15, 1888 – April 23, 1955) was an American politician who served in the California State Assembly for the 75th and 63rd District from 1929 to 1933. During World War I he served in the United States Army.
