= George W. Rochester =

American politician

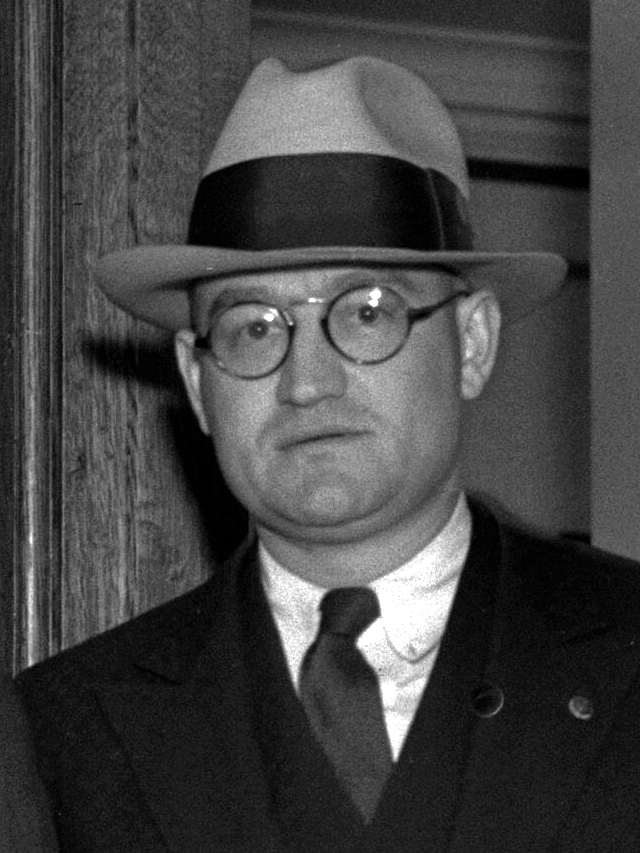
- Rochester in 1931

Member of the California Senate from the 37th district
- In office January 7, 1929 – January 2, 1933
- Preceded by: Newton M. Allen
- Succeeded by: Leonard Joseph Difani

Member of the California State Assembly from the 75th district
- In office January 3, 1927 – January 7, 1929
- Preceded by: Mark A. Pierce
- Succeeded by: Emory J. Arnold

Personal details
- Born: August 28, 1899 Illinois, US
- Died: September 17, 1984 (aged 85)
- Party: Republican
- Spouse: Loie H.

Military service
- Branch/service: United States Navy Reserve
- Battles/wars: World War I

George William Rochester (August 28, 1899 – September 17, 1984) was an American politician who was a member of the California State Assembly for the 75th district from 1927 to 1929 and served in the California State Senate for the 37th district from 1929 to 1933. During World War I he served in the United States Navy Reserve.

He sponsored California's gin marriage law, which passed in 1928.
