= California's 75th State Assembly district =

American legislative district

Current assemblymember
Carl DeMaio; R–San Diego
- Population (2010) • Voting age • Citizen voting age: 465,548; 339,242; 257,429
- Demographics: 51.53% White; 2.72% Black; 35.44% Latino; 7.93% Asian; 1.26% Native American; 0.38% Hawaiian/Pacific Islander; 0.23% other; 0.50% remainder of multiracial
- Registered voters: 271,611
- Registration: 37.64% Republican; 32.03% Democratic; 23.78% No party preference

California's 75th State Assembly district is one of 80 California State Assembly districts. It is currently represented by Republican Carl DeMaio of San Diego.

== District profile ==
The district encompasses inland parts of San Diego County. The area is mountainous, containing most of the county's land area, covering the rural eastern portions of the county. The district includes the communities of Poway, Santee, Lakeside, Fallbrook, Pala, Ramona, Borrego Springs, Julian, Alpine, and Pine Valley.

== Election results from statewide races ==
Year	Office	Results
2024	President	Trump 55.7 – 41.8%
2020	President	Biden 49.8 – 48.2%
2018	Governor	Cox 55.7 – 44.3%
2018	Senator (Note: Because of California's nonpartisan blanket primary system, both candidates were Democrats.)	De Leon 51.5 – 48.5%
2016	President	Trump 50.7 – 43.2%
2016	Senator	Harris 55.6 – 44.4%
2014	Governor	Kashkari 62.2 – 37.8%
2012	President	Romney 58.5 – 39.4%
2012	Senator	Emken 59.5 – 40.5%

== List of assembly members representing the district ==
Due to redistricting, the 75th district has been moved around different parts of the state. The current iteration resulted from the 2021 redistricting by the California Citizens Redistricting Commission.

Member	Party	Years served	Electoral history	Counties represented
R. I. Ashe (Bakersfield)	Democratic	January 5, 1885 – January 3, 1887	Elected in 1884. [data missing]	Kern, Ventura
J. Marion Brooks (Ventura)	Democratic	January 3, 1887 – January 7, 1889	Elected in 1888. [data missing]	Kern, Ventura
G. W. Wear (Bakersfield)	Democratic	January 7, 1889 – January 5, 1891	Elected in 1888. [data missing]	Kern, Ventura
T. A. Rice (Oxnard)	Democratic	January 5, 1891 – January 2, 1893	Elected in 1890. [data missing]	Kern, Ventura
Robert N. Bulla (Los Angeles)	Republican	January 2, 1893 – January 4, 1897	Elected in 1892. Re-elected in 1894. Retired to run for California State Senate.	Los Angeles
John Cross (Los Angeles)	Republican	January 4, 1897 – January 2, 1899	Elected in 1896. [data missing]	Los Angeles
Nathaniel P. Conrey (Los Angeles)	Republican	January 2, 1899 – January 1, 1901	Elected in 1898. Retired after appointment to the Los Angeles County Superior Court.	Los Angeles
Henry E. Carter (Los Angeles)	Republican	January 1, 1901 – January 2, 1905	Elected in 1900. Re-elected in 1902. Retired to run for California State Senate.	Los Angeles
Vacant		January 2, 1905 – January 7, 1907	Assemblymember-elect J. H. Krimminger died December 12, 1904.	Los Angeles
Percy V. Hammon (Los Angeles)	Republican	January 7, 1907 – January 2, 1911	Elected in 1906. Re-elected in 1908. [data missing]	Los Angeles
William A. Lamb (Los Angeles)	Republican	January 2, 1911 – January 6, 1913	Elected in 1910. [data missing]	Los Angeles
Lyman Farwell (Los Angeles)	Republican	January 6, 1913 – January 4, 1915	Redistricted from the 71st district and re-elected in 1912. [data missing]	Los Angeles
James S. McKnight (Los Angeles)	Progressive	January 4, 1915 – January 8, 1917	Elected in 1914. [data missing]	Los Angeles
Edwin T. Baker (Los Angeles)	Republican	January 8, 1917 – January 5, 1925	Elected in 1916. Re-elected in 1918. Re-elected in 1920. Re-elected in 1922. [data missing]	Los Angeles
Mark A. Pierce (Los Angeles)	Republican	January 5, 1925 – January 3, 1927	Elected in 1924. Lost renomination.	Los Angeles
George W. Rochester (Los Angeles)	Republican	January 3, 1927 – January 7, 1929	Elected in 1926. [data missing]	Los Angeles
Emory J. Arnold (Los Angeles)	Republican	January 7, 1929 – January 5, 1931	Elected in 1928. Redistricted to the 63rd district.	Los Angeles
Edward Craig (Brea)	Republican	January 5, 1931 – January 4, 1937	Redistricted from the 76th district and re-elected in 1930. Re-elected in 1932. Re-elected in 1934. [data missing]	Orange
Thomas Kuchel (Anaheim)	Republican	January 4, 1937 – January 6, 1941	Elected in 1936. Re-elected in 1938. Retired to run for California State Senate.	Orange
Sam L. Collins (Fullerton)	Republican	January 6, 1941 – January 5, 1953	Elected in 1940. Re-elected in 1942. Re-elected in 1944. Re-elected in 1946. Re-elected in 1948. Re-elected in 1950. Retired to run for California State Senate.	Orange
LeRoy E. Lyon Jr. (Anaheim)	Republican	January 5, 1953 – June 30, 1955	Elected in 1952. Re-elected in 1954. Resigned.	Orange
Vacant		June 30, 1955 – June 28, 1956		Orange
Richard T. Hanna (Anaheim)	Democratic	June 28, 1956 – January 3, 1963	Elected to finish Lyon Jr.'s term. Re-elected in 1956. Re-elected in 1958. Re-elected in 1960. Resigned after election to the U.S. House of Representatives.	Orange
Vacant		January 3, 1963 – January 7, 1963		Orange
Victor Veysey (Brawley)	Republican	January 7, 1963 – January 3, 1971	Elected in 1962. Re-elected in 1964. Re-elected in 1966. Re-elected in 1968. Retired to run for U.S. House of Representatives.	Imperial
Raymond T. Seeley (Blythe)	Republican	January 4, 1971 – November 30, 1974	Elected in 1970. Re-elected in 1972. Lost re-election.	Imperial, Riverside
Tom Suitt (Palm Springs)	Democratic	December 2, 1974 – November 30, 1978	Elected in 1974. Re-elected in 1976. Lost re-election.	Imperial, Riverside, San Diego
David G. Kelley (Riverside)	Republican	December 4, 1978 – November 30, 1982	Elected in 1978. Re-elected in 1980. Redistricted to the 73rd district.	Imperial, Riverside, San Diego
Joyce Mojonnier (San Diego)	Republican	December 6, 1982 – November 30, 1990	Elected in 1982. Re-elected in 1984. Re-elected in 1986. Re-elected in 1988. Lost re-election.	San Diego
Dede Alpert (San Diego)	Democratic	December 3, 1990 – November 30, 1992	Elected in 1990. Redistricted to the 78th district.	San Diego
Jan Goldsmith (Poway)	Republican	December 7, 1992 – November 30, 1998	Elected in 1992. Re-elected in 1994. Re-elected in 1996. Term-limited and ran for California State Treasurer.	San Diego
Charlene Zettel (San Diego)	Republican	December 7, 1998 – November 30, 2002	Elected in 1998. Re-elected in 2000. Retired to run for California State Senate.	San Diego
George Plescia (San Diego)	Republican	December 2, 2002 – November 30, 2008	Elected in 2002. Re-elected in 2004. Re-elected in 2006. Retired.	San Diego
Nathan Fletcher (San Diego)	Republican	December 1, 2008 – March 27, 2012	Elected in 2008. Re-elected in 2010. Retired to run for mayor of San Diego.	San Diego
Nathan Fletcher (San Diego)	Independent	March 27, 2012 – November 30, 2012	Elected in 2008. Re-elected in 2010. Retired to run for mayor of San Diego.	San Diego
Marie Waldron (Valley Center)	Republican	December 3, 2012 – November 30, 2024	Elected in 2012. Re-elected in 2014. Re-elected in 2016. Re-elected in 2018. Re-elected in 2020. Re-elected in 2022. Term-limited and retired.	San Diego, Riverside
Carl DeMaio (San Diego)	Republican	December 2, 2024 – present	Elected in 2024.	San Diego, Riverside

== Election results (1990–present) ==
=== 2024 ===
2024 California State Assembly 75th district election
Primary election
Party	Candidate	Votes	%
Republican	Carl DeMaio	54,350	42.9
Republican	Andrew Hayes	23,664	18.7
Democratic	Kevin Juza	23,010	18.2
Democratic	Christie Dougherty	12,675	10.0
Democratic	Joy Frew	9,362	7.4
Republican	Jack Fernandes	3,596	2.8
Total votes		126,657	100.0
General election
Republican	Carl DeMaio	121,167	57.0
Republican	Andrew Hayes	91,337	43.0
Total votes		212,504	100.0
Republican hold			

=== 2022 ===
2022 California State Assembly 75th district election
Primary election
Party	Candidate	Votes	%
Republican	Marie Waldron (incumbent)	59,612	63.5
Republican	Randy Voepel (incumbent)	34,328	36.5
Total votes		93,940	100.0
General election
Republican	Marie Waldron (incumbent)	100,950	67.8
Republican	Randy Voepel (incumbent)	47,888	32.2
Total votes		148,838	100.0
Republican hold			

=== 2020 ===
2020 California State Assembly 75th district election
Primary election
Party	Candidate	Votes	%
Republican	Marie Waldron (incumbent)	71,217	56.3
Democratic	Karen "Kate" Schwartz	47,988	37.9
Democratic	Roger Garcia	7,327	5.8
Total votes		126,532	100.0
General election
Republican	Marie Waldron (incumbent)	128,576	54.5
Democratic	Karen "Kate" Schwartz	107,170	45.5
Total votes		235,746	100.0
Republican hold			

=== 2018 ===
2018 California State Assembly 75th district election
Primary election
Party	Candidate	Votes	%
Republican	Marie Waldron (incumbent)	56,646	61.6
Democratic	Alan Geraci	35,324	38.4
Total votes		91,970	100.0
General election
Republican	Marie Waldron (incumbent)	95,236	56.4
Democratic	Alan Geraci	73,707	43.6
Total votes		168,943	100.0
Republican hold			

=== 2016 ===
2016 California State Assembly 75th district election
Primary election
Party	Candidate	Votes	%
Republican	Marie Waldron (incumbent)	56,407	60.3
Democratic	Andrew Masiel Sr.	37,104	39.7
Total votes		93,511	100.0
General election
Republican	Marie Waldron (incumbent)	111,598	62.9
Democratic	Andrew Masiel Sr.	65,770	37.1
Total votes		177,368	100.0
Republican hold			

=== 2014 ===
2014 California State Assembly 75th district election
Primary election
Party	Candidate	Votes	%
Republican	Marie Waldron (incumbent)	41,510	99.1
Democratic	Nicholas Shestople (write-in)	375	0.9
Libertarian	Mike Paster (write-in)	14	0.0
Total votes		41,899	100.0
General election
Republican	Marie Waldron (incumbent)	66,152	69.0
Democratic	Nicholas Shestople	29,761	31.0
Total votes		95,913	100.0
Republican hold			

=== 2012 ===
2012 California State Assembly 75th district election
Primary election
Party	Candidate	Votes	%
Republican	Marie Waldron	44,013	68.6
Democratic	Matthew Herold	20,180	31.4
Total votes		64,193	100.0
General election
Republican	Marie Waldron	98,686	62.7
Democratic	Matthew Herold	58,783	37.3
Total votes		157,469	100.0
Republican hold			

=== 2010 ===
2010 California State Assembly 75th district election
Party	Candidate	Votes	%
Republican	Nathan Fletcher (incumbent)	92,430	60.5
Democratic	Paul R. Garver	54,711	35.8
Libertarian	Christopher Chadwick	5,692	3.7
Total votes		152,833	100.0
Republican hold			

=== 2008 ===
2008 California State Assembly 75th district election
Party	Candidate	Votes	%
Republican	Nathan Fletcher	98,758	52.1
Democratic	Darren Kasai	78,970	41.7
Libertarian	John Murphy	11,731	6.2
Total votes		189,459	100.0
Republican hold			

=== 2006 ===
2006 California State Assembly 75th district election
Party	Candidate	Votes	%
Republican	George Plescia (incumbent)	77,921	57.9
Democratic	Scott Meyer	52,881	39.3
Libertarian	Edward Teyssier	3,856	2.9
Total votes		134,658	100.0
Republican hold			

=== 2004 ===
2004 California State Assembly 75th district election
Party	Candidate	Votes	%
Republican	George A. Plescia (incumbent)	108,728	59.8
Democratic	Karen Heumann	69,017	38.0
Libertarian	Richard J. Senecal	4,005	2.2
Total votes		181,750	100.0
Republican hold			

=== 2002 ===
2002 California State Assembly 75th district election
Party	Candidate	Votes	%
Republican	George A. Plescia	64,452	58.6
Democratic	Connie Witt	42,557	38.6
Libertarian	Richard J. Senecal	3,147	2.8
Total votes		110,156	100.0
Republican hold			

=== 2000 ===
2000 California State Assembly 75th district election
Party	Candidate	Votes	%
Republican	Charlene Zettel (incumbent)	103,545	64.0
Democratic	Judith K. Walters	50,005	30.9
Libertarian	Gary Walter Pietila	8,136	5.0
Total votes		161,686	100.0
Republican hold			

=== 1998 ===
1998 California State Assembly 75th district election
Party	Candidate	Votes	%
Republican	Charlene Zettel	79,365	64.3
Democratic	David Debus	34,407	27.9
Libertarian	Donna Tello	6,017	4.9
Natural Law	William S. Cowling III	3,630	2.9
Total votes		123,419	100.0
Republican hold			

=== 1996 ===
1996 California State Assembly 75th district election
Party	Candidate	Votes	%
Republican	Jan Goldsmith (incumbent)	106,944	71.6
Democratic	Adrian S. Kwiatkowski	35,805	24.0
Natural Law	William S. Cowling III	6,573	4.4
Total votes		149,322	100.0
Republican hold			

=== 1994 ===
1994 California State Assembly 75th district election
Party	Candidate	Votes	%
Republican	Jan Goldsmith (incumbent)	91,109	70.0
Democratic	Katherine Wodehouse	31,145	23.9
Libertarian	J. C. Anderson	4,768	3.7
Peace and Freedom	Ann Archer	3,097	2.4
Total votes		130,119	100.0
Republican hold			

=== 1992 ===
1992 California State Assembly 75th district election
Party	Candidate	Votes	%
Republican	Jan Goldsmith	100,858	64.5
Democratic	Dante Cosentino	42,375	27.1
Libertarian	J. C. Anderson	6,282	4.0
Green	Daniel Ford Tarr	3,899	2.5
Peace and Freedom	Alfredo R. Felix	3,037	1.9
Total votes		156,451	100.0
Republican gain from Democratic			

=== 1990 ===
1990 California State Assembly 75th district election
Party	Candidate	Votes	%
Democratic	Dede Alpert	57,735	45.7
Republican	Joyce Mojonnier (incumbent)	51,821	41.0
Libertarian	John Murphy	13,836	10.9
Peace and Freedom	Vi Phuong Huynh	3,025	2.4
Total votes		126,417	100.0
Democratic gain from Republican			

== See also ==
- California State Assembly
- California State Assembly districts
- Districts in California
