= Gin marriage law =

Laws in several American states in the 1930s

Gin marriage laws were laws passed in several American states in the 1930s that required waiting periods of several days between getting a marriage license and marrying. They were passed as part of a Prohibition-era moral panic over the idea of couples getting married while drunk.

In 1927, The Pittsburgh Press said, "It was believed that a three-day cooling off would temper the ardor of unruly impetuous maids and swains."

== States ==
=== California ===
California passed a gin marriage law in 1928 sponsored by George W. Rochester. It was criticized for decreasing the number of weddings. In the first nine months after the law there were 5786 fewer marriages that the same time the previous year. The Human Betterment Foundation praised the law noting that in 1932 in Los Angeles 569 licenses went unclaimed after the end of the waiting period most of which the HBF said were probably "freak marriages, fraudulent marriages, drunken marriages, runaway marriages and others whose abandonment was a gain to all concerned. There was an attempted repeal in 1935, and again in 1939.

=== Idaho ===
Idaho passed a gin marriage law that went into effect May 5, 1931. This caused many to travel to Washington to get married. It was repealed in 1933 due to exodus of marriages to other states it was causing.

=== New York ===
The New York state law requiring a three-day waiting period was passed in 1936 championed by Jane Hedges Todd.

=== Oregon ===
Oregon passed a gin marriage law in 1933, it required a four-day wait.

=== Washington ===
There was a push for a gin marriage law in Washington in 1939 heavily backed by the Washington State Federation of Women's Clubs. Vice president of the WSFWC Mrs. A. B. Swenssen said "we women feel many divorces are the result of hasty marriages, many of them made while young people are under the influence of liquour".

=== Wyoming ===
Wyoming passed its gin marriage law in 1931. It required a five-day wait. Number of weddings subsequently decreased.
