= Murray Hantman =

American painter, muralist, and teacher

Murray Hantman (1904–1999) was a painter, muralist, and teacher. Over the course of his career Hantman's work progressed from realism to abstraction. Based in New York City, Hantman spent summers on Monhegan Island.

Like many of his generation, Hantman ultimately rejected explicit narrative in his paintings for a more primal expression of experience.
