= Red Hynes =

Los Angeles police officer (1897–1952)

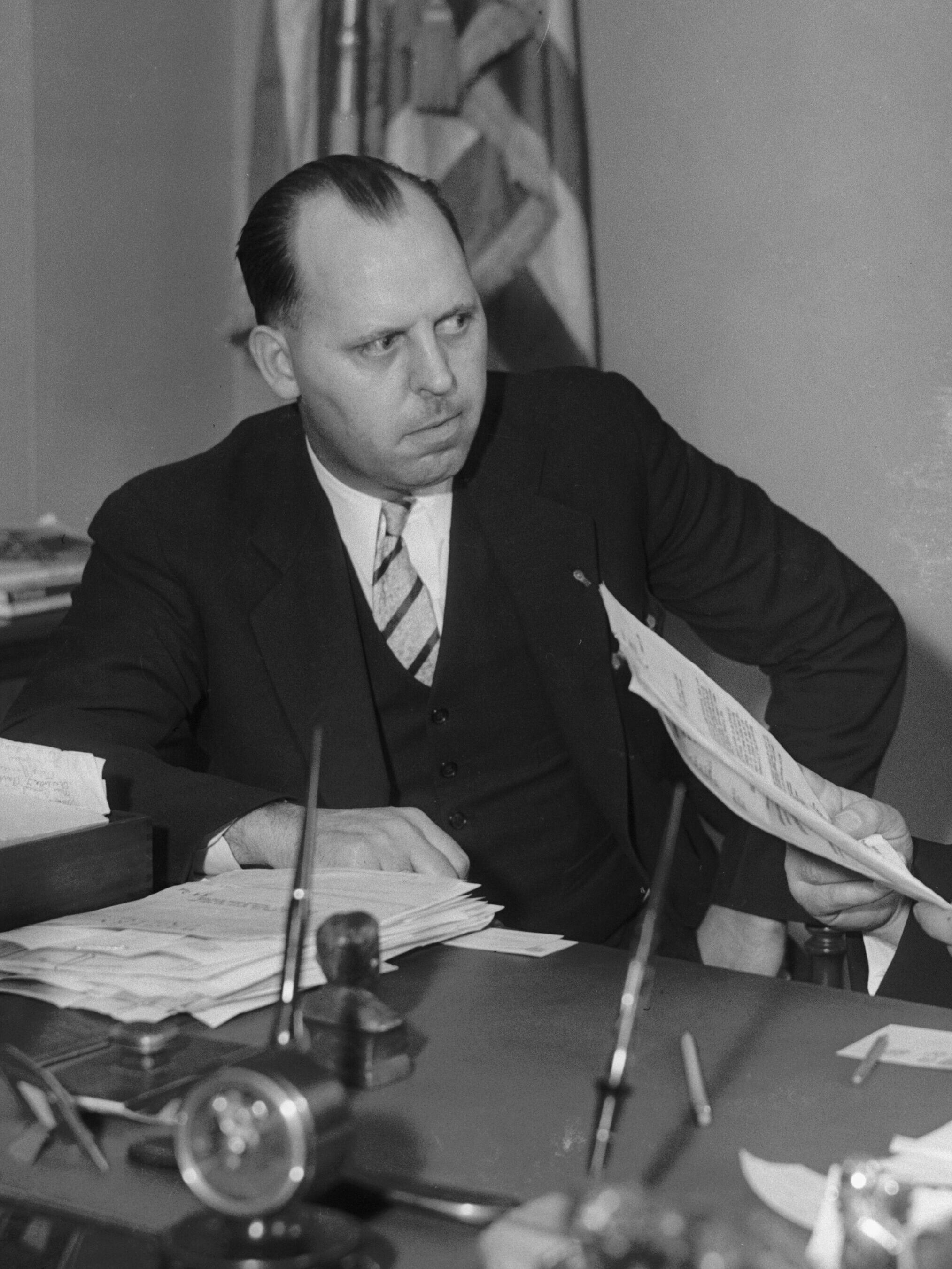
- Hynes c. 1934
- Born: July 30, 1897; St. Louis, Missouri, U.S.
- Died: May 16, 1952 (aged 54); Los Angeles, California, U.S.
- Occupations: Police officer, anti-labor activist

William Francis Hynes (July 30, 1897 – May 16, 1952), known as Red Hynes, was an anti-communist and anti-labor American police officer who led the Los Angeles Police Department "Red Squad" in the 1920s and 1930s. The LAPD Red Squad generally and Hynes specifically were known for both their violence and their corrupt profiteering as enforcers for hire. Hynes personally pioneered a number of "anti-subversive" propaganda techniques and became a nationally recognized expert on anti-communism with a side hustle as a regional strikebreaker.

Hynes was a U.S. Army veteran who first came to public notice when he infiltrated the IWW in San Pedro, California and contributed significantly to disrupting a strike action there in 1923. Hynes was then promoted within LAPD and ultimately given control of the anti-radical half of the department's Intelligence Division, functioning as both a detective and as a police commander. Hynes, who was described as a proto-fascist mercenary by his targets and opponents, was just one element of a larger system wherein LAPD worked not so much for the general public as for a close-knit group of L.A. businessmen. The Red Squad's aggressive investigation, infiltration, and physical attacks on liberal groups and labor organizers in the Greater Los Angeles area successfully protected the area's "open shop" system and suppressed the labor movement and left-wing political organizations in Southern California during the Great Depression.

In 1938, when a new reform-minded chief of police came to power, Hynes was demoted from acting captain back to patrolman and spent the remaining years of his LAPD career as a local beat cop. Hynes died of hepatoma in 1952. Evidence collected by Hynes was still being cited in Congressional anti-communist hearings in 1957. The long shadow cast by the Red Squad continued to influence popular perception of the municipal police in Los Angeles until at least the 1960s if not until the 1992 Los Angeles riots and beyond.

== Life and work ==
Red Hynes, who worked for the LAPD under Chief James Davis and Mayor Frank Shaw, was "notorious for his sometimes violent, legally questionable pursuit of suspected Communists, and he was believed sympathetic toward far-right extremists." During his time on the public payroll in Los Angeles, Hynes was perhaps the "most potent force in the Police Department and city" and "one of the first crusaders against the 'evils of communism'." According to Davis in the 1933 LAPD annual report, the Red Squad's "primary function was the 'investigation and control of radical activities, strikes, and riots'. These duties included raids on 'radical' headquarters, prevention of open discussion in public parks and streets (violation of city ordinance), denial of permits for protest marches, and any other activities which would help to disrupt communists." Davis was authoritarian by temperament and "As the Record put it after a lengthy interview: 'Davis quite honestly and sincerely believes that the country would be much better off if the whole question of constitutional rights was forgotten, and everything left to the discretion of the police...It is an axiom with Davis that constitutional rights are of benefit to nobody but crooks and criminals, and that no perfectly law-abiding citizen ever has any cause to insist upon 'constitutional rights.'" Hynes and the Red Squad were symptomatic of a broader "surge in hyperpatriotic and antiunion thinking among the state's business interests" in the aftermath of World War I. California business interests, through the state Republican Party, also promoted high tariffs and exclusion of Japanese migrants to the United States.

The Red Squad was really two separate entities, albeit Hynes had a hand in both: the Red Squad was the muscle that focused on suppressing "enemies" of the city power structure, while the Intelligence Squad did the legwork "to spy on, compromise, and intimidate critics and foes of the department and the mayor" and keep the whole operation afloat. The Intelligence Squad was reportedly staffed with 19 men. Davis' key enforcers included Hynes, Luke Lane, and Max Berenzweig, a vice squad commander who was never able to pass the civil service exam. Another key figure in the Intelligence Squad was Earl Kynette.

According to an investigator of police corruption under the Hoover administration, Hynes and Davis participated in a not-uncommon system of corruption: "I asked a Western detective what drew young men into police work. He answered without hesitation: 'Adventure'; then after a pause, added 'and graft.'" According to a history of Red Squads in the U.S., these institutions were anti-subversive and anti-communist in part as a grift run by police departments against corporate interests; promoting capitalist fear of workers and unions created an income stream for police officers willing to use violence for a modest payoff. Countersubversive units like Hynes' Red Squad also served as a sort of municipal secret police, creating dossiers on the citizenry under the guise of public safety but ultimately for the benefit of private entities and Hynes himself. Hynes made a name for himself testifying before various government subcommittees about alleged communist infiltration of American institutions, presenting the materials accumulated by the Red Squad intelligence network as evidence.

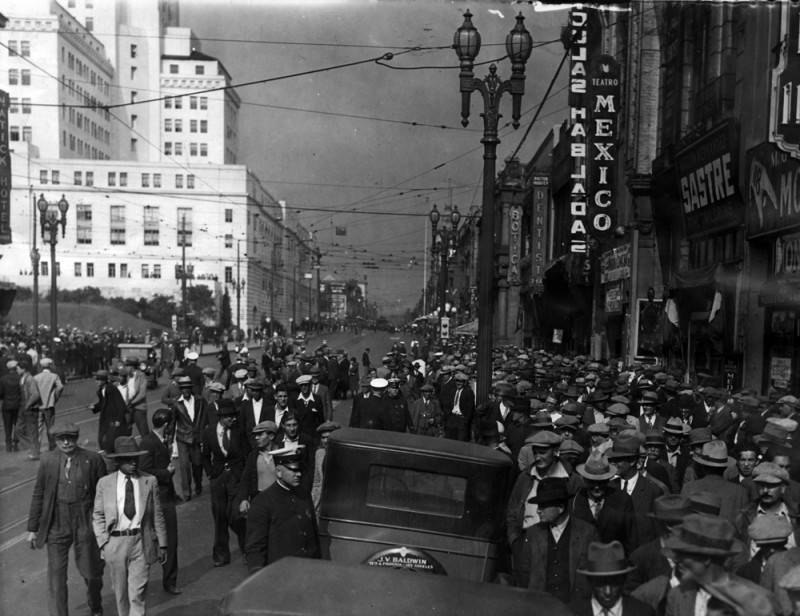
Police monitor a crowd at a Communist demonstration on Main Street March 8, 1930

Hynes joined the department in 1921 or 1922. Hynes in particular did lots of anti-labor work, hiring men to work undercover within businesses that might have a union-curious workforce; his "customers," as it were, were "Los Angeles area business owners concerned about a rising tide of unionization in the 1930s, and who were willing to pay to prevent or disrupt it." The LAPD Red Squad made arrests on criminal syndicalism charges in some cases but also found that "simple intimidation or a good beating could get the job done just as effectively." After starting out in labor suppression by infiltrating the IWW, Hynes worked regular crime for a while in the middle of the 1920s, but returned to the Red Squad in 1927, "this time as the acting-Lieutenant in charge of the unit; he would not leave the unit again until its dissolution in 1939." Hynes' Red Squad had separate offices in the Los Angeles Chamber of Commerce building, and he had a side hustle consulting for private companies on effective labor suppression.

Intimidation tactics under Hynes were described by the journalist Carey McWilliams: "Typical of these years is a little boxed story that appeared in the Los Angeles press: 'This will be a 'shove Tuesday' for the Los Angeles police. The communists plan to stage another demonstration today, according to Capt. Wm. Hynes, which means that 500 police will be held in readiness. If the communists demonstrate, the police will shove and keep on shoving until the parade is disrupted.' The 'shove days' were of regular occurrence in Los Angeles."

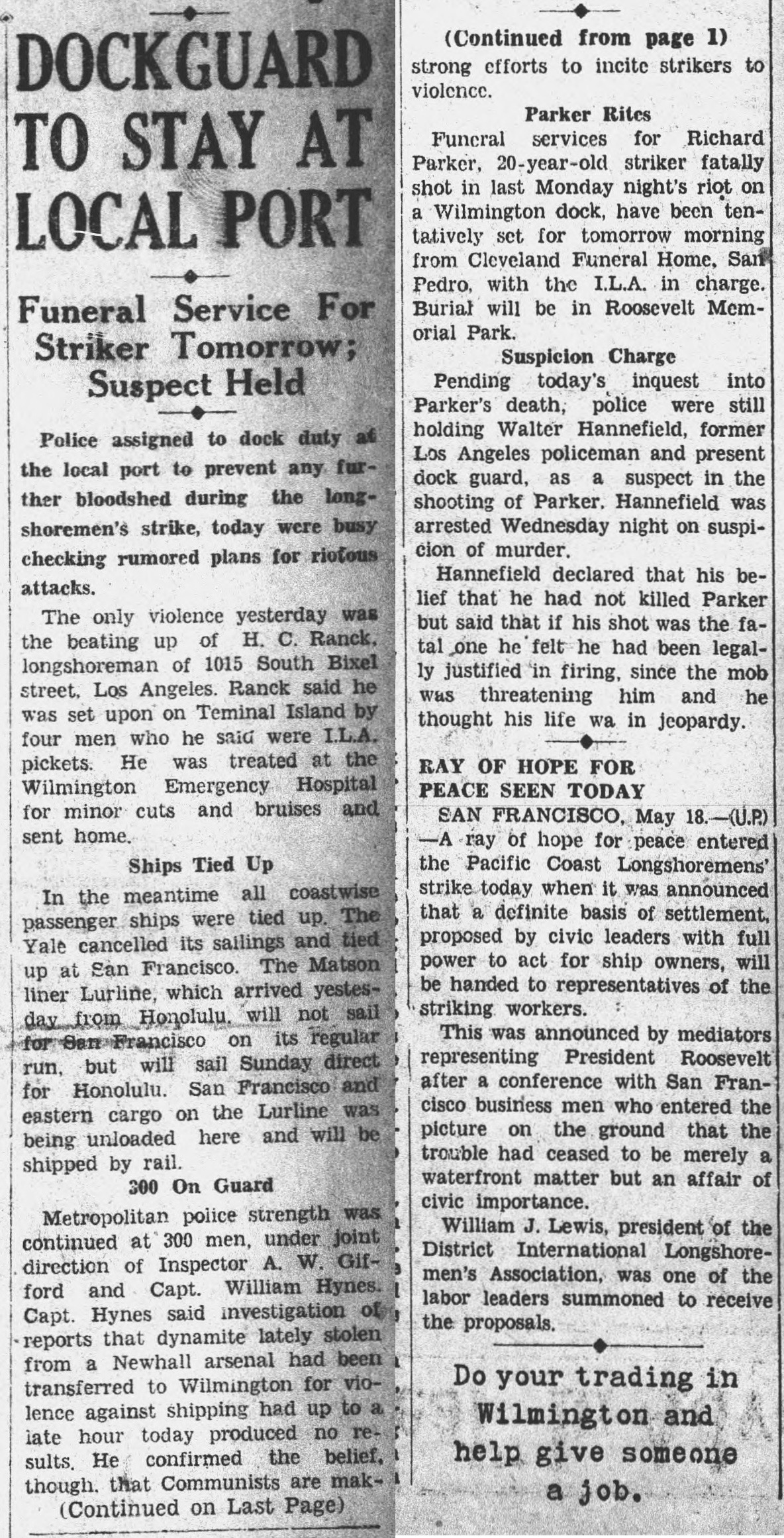
Wilmington News Journal article from May 18, 1834, about 1934 West Coast waterfront strike

The Red Squad disrupted the screening of films it considered subversive with Hynes shrugging to a Congressional committee in 1930 that they did so under "no particular law." They also spied on "Industrial Workers of the World; Italian anarchists; Mexican Obreros Libres (Free Workers); ACLU members; pacifists; radical intellectuals; the local branch of the Universal Negro Improvement Association; radical churches and women's clubs; and a veritable host of trade and labor union locals, including carpenters, painters, butchers, and bakers." Hynes also surveilled local Nazi-aligned groups using funds provided by the Jewish Federation of Los Angeles. In 1939 Marxist muckraker John L. Spivak alleged that both the Italian and Japanese intelligence services had paid Hynes for reports on assorted California communists and trade-unionists. The Communist Party was always a weak entity in Southern California and it stayed such under Hynes' effective attacks on meetings and assemblies. Infiltrating workers' groups at oil refineries and factories was also part of the Red Squad's bread and butter. During the social upheaval of the Great Depression, even meetings of the jobless were targeted: "a group of the unemployed, under the auspices of the National Federation of Unemployed Workers League of America, arranged a demonstration in honor of President Roosevelt's inauguration, but the police, led by Captain William F. Hynes, were present to disband the participants."

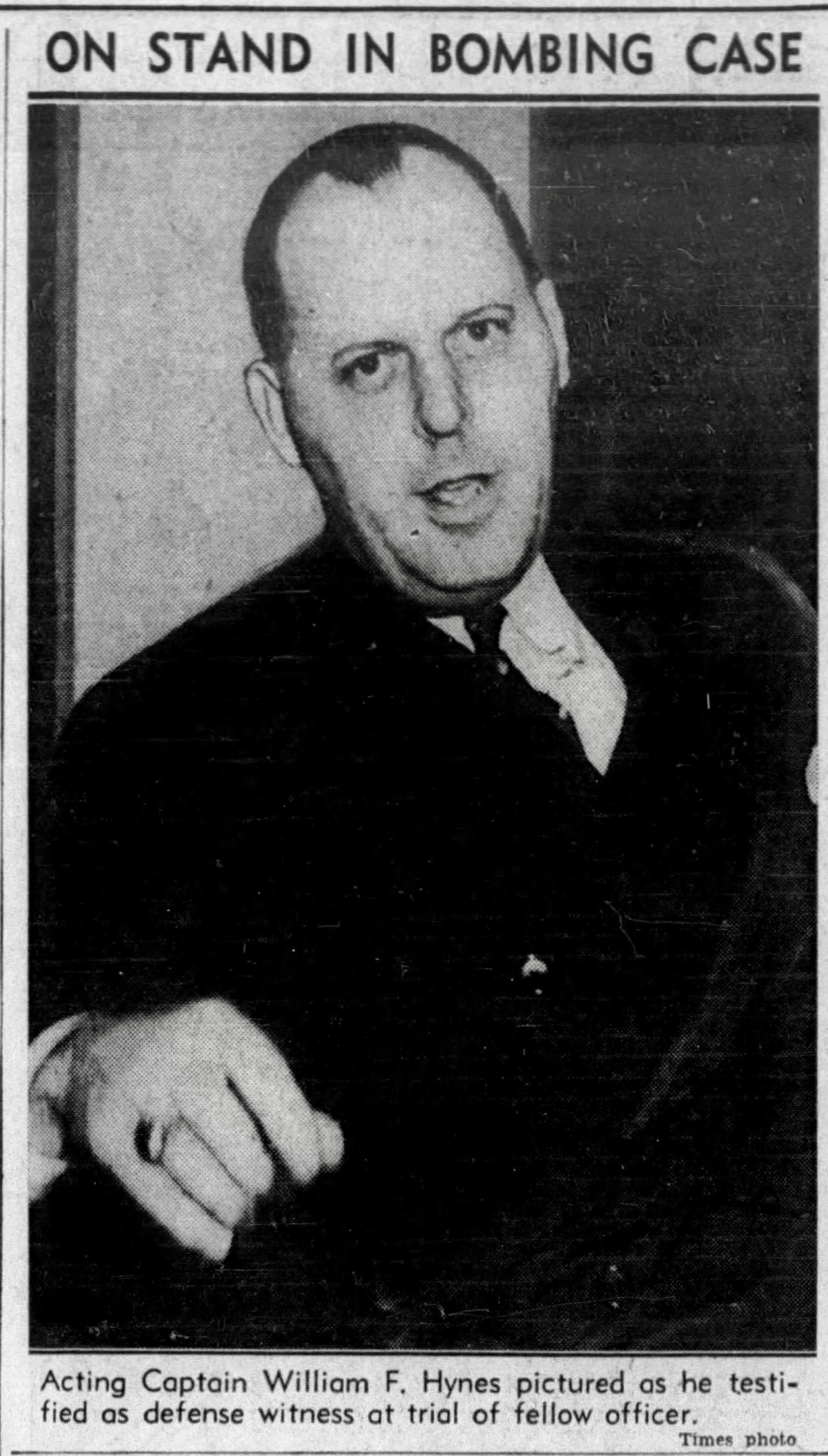
Acting Captain William F. Hynes pictured as he testified as defense witness at trial of fellow officer (Los Angeles Times, May 24, 1938)

The LAPD Red Squad was finally shut down following the convictions of Earl Kynette and Roy Allen for conspiring to plant a bomb in the car of a civil reform advocate, and more broadly "by World War II, the scattered, sometimes competing, sometimes amateurish anticommunist efforts of the American Legion, red squads, the National Guard, MID, and INS during the 1930s had all largely given way to the programs of the FBI-which were typically more centralized, better funded, and often more professional." An obituary for Hynes published in The Nation in 1952 recognized him as "one of the first of the mercenaries in the crusade against 'communism'".

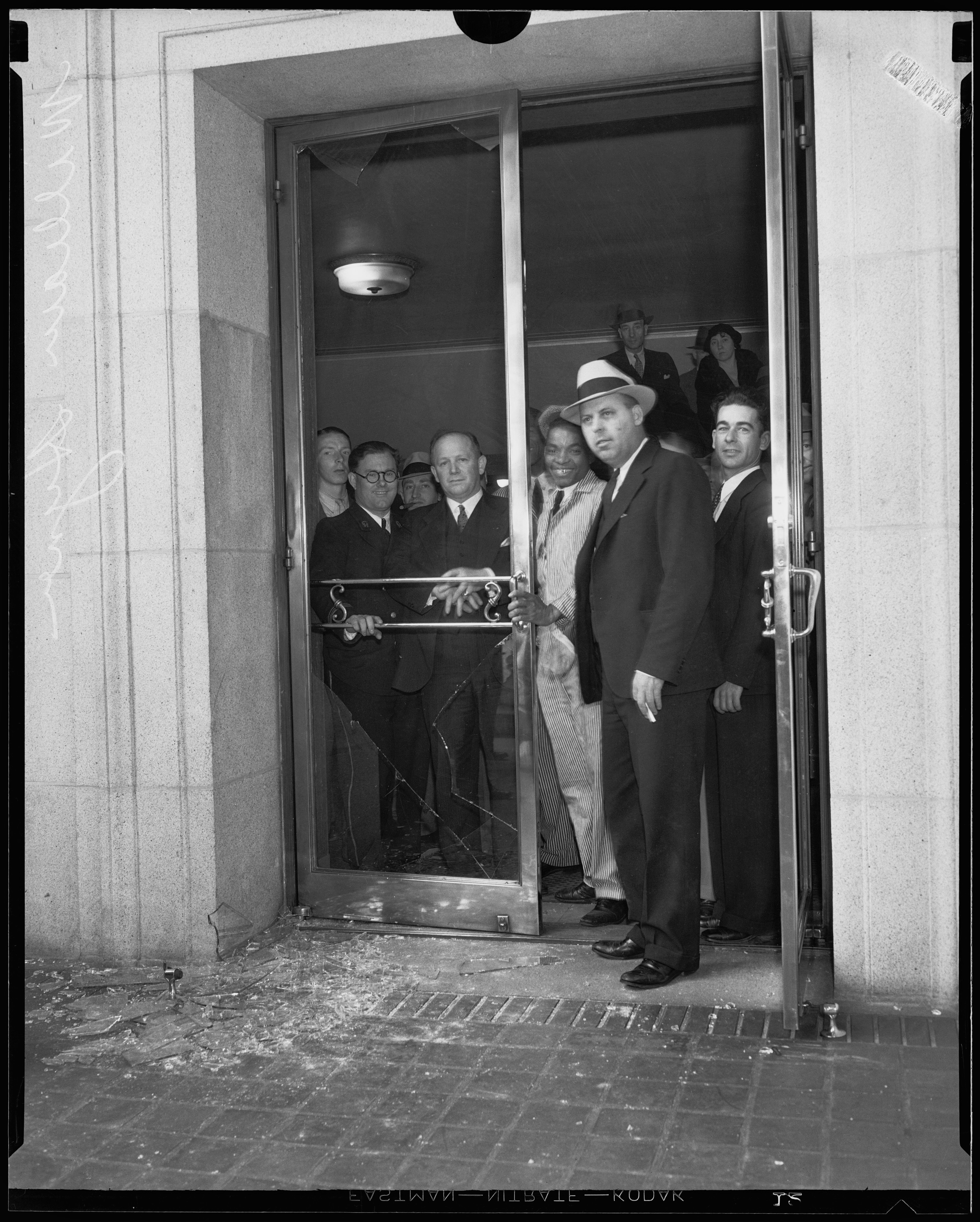
Officer William Hynes stands before broken glass door, Los Angeles, 1933 (LAT via UCLA Digital)

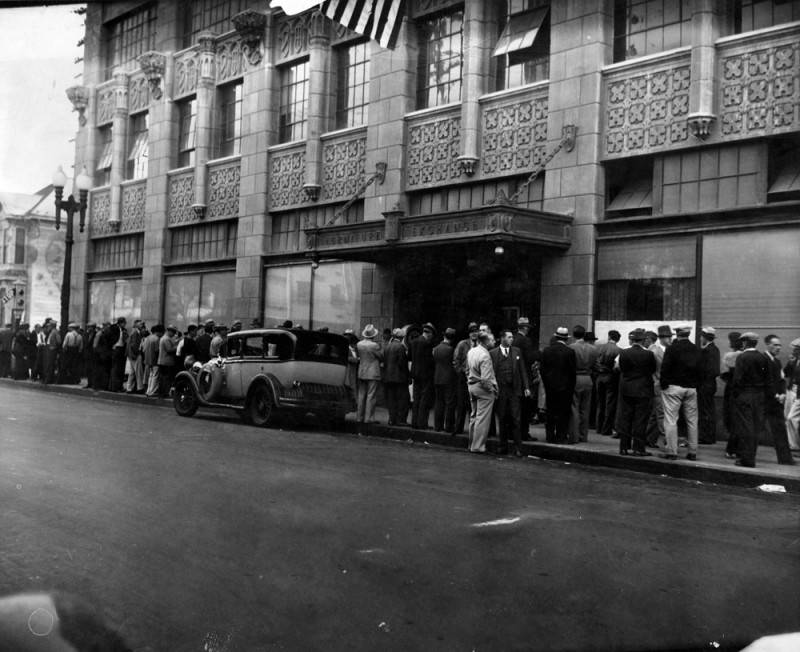
Red squad watches "jobless crowd" at WPA building 1935 (HE Sep. 28, 1935 via LAPL)

== Influence ==
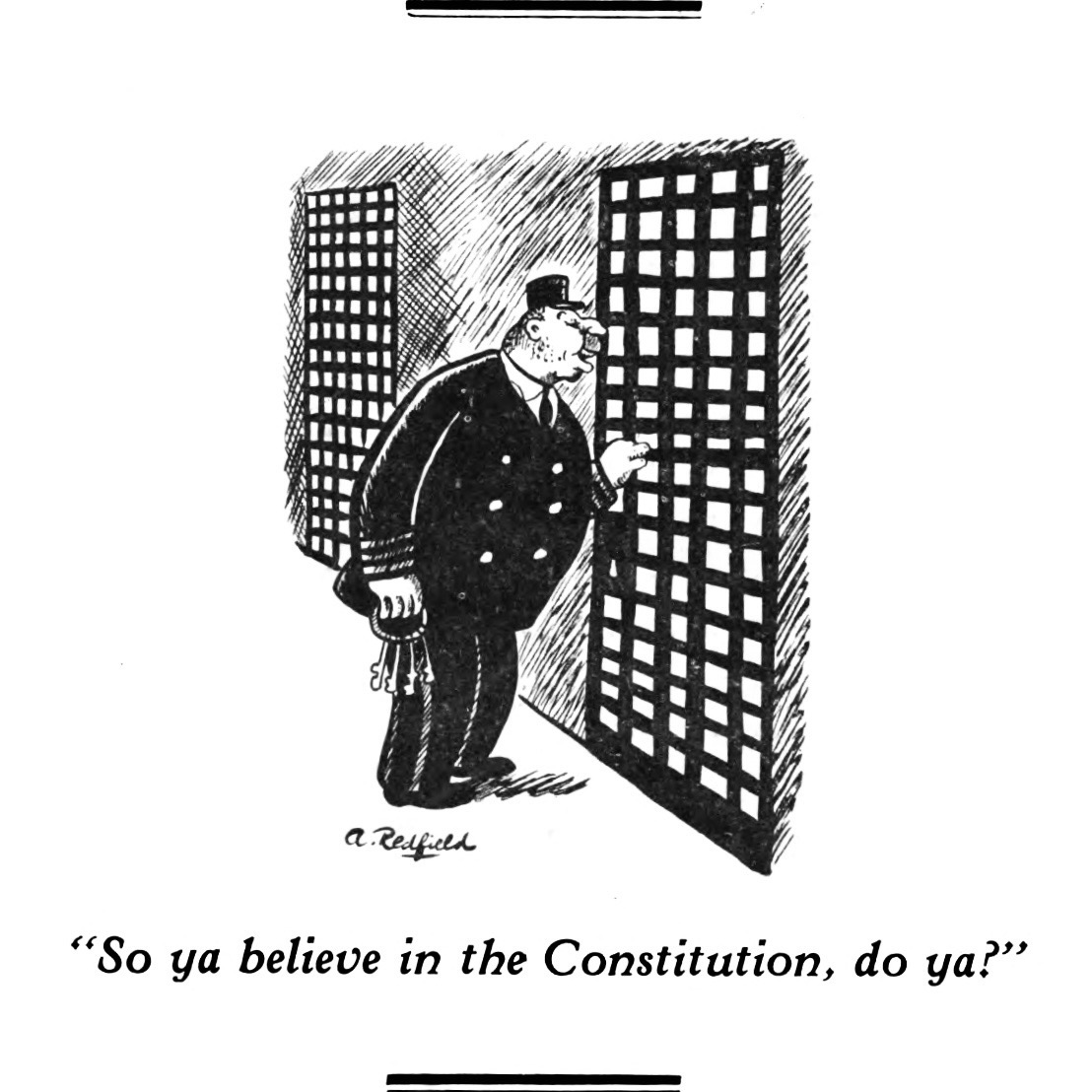
June 1935 cartoon by A. Redfield (pen name of Syd Hoff) published as title page illustration of an ACLU annual report

By the end of the 1930s, "the LAPD would become far less a policy arm of the city's business establishment and the mayor than it had been before. But the tradition within the department of intolerance of political dissent, and of spying and keeping dossiers on anyone who criticized the status quo, would remain an integral part of the department's culture, one that would rise up again and again." Meanwhile, according to writer Carey McWilliams, "'Red' Hynes made a dozen radicals in Los Angeles for every arrest he ever made." A Mexican immigrant who worked in the orange groves said as much: "They hired the Red Squad from Los Angeles to quell that rebellion. They beat the hell out of him. They cracked his head open several times.... Boy, they treated him so bad [that] they made a Communist out of him."

== Personal life ==
Hynes' father worked as a saloon keeper at the time of the 1910 U.S. census. Hynes served in the U.S. Army in from April 6, 1917, to April 2, 1919, as a second lieutenant in the quartermaster corps. Hynes was married in Los Angeles County in 1923 to Mary E. Bullock. When Hynes' son was born the following year, Hynes occupation was listed as detective on the birth certificate. His nickname was a reference to his "anti-communist activities" not his hair color. According to his World War II draft record, Hynes was 5 ft 11 in (1.80 m) and had "thumb off left hand." In 1938 his son ran away from home with plans to be a horse jockey. Hynes died on May 16, 1952, at Good Samaritan Hospital in Los Angeles of "hepatoma, primary."

== In popular culture ==
Red Hynes was the subject of a 2013 experimental documentary by Travis Wilkerson called Los Angeles Red Squad: The Communist Situation in California. According to Sight & Sound magazine, in the "stripped-down, essayistic" film Wilkerson characterizes Hynes' organization (and the 1920s–30s LAPD generally) as a "paid political militia, systematically breaking up left-wing meetings". Manohla Dargis described it as a "restrained if outraged" examination of how "explores how business interests and the police wielded power like a cudgel to prevent ordinary working people from congregating, organizing and speaking up".

== See also ==
- "The Lid Off Los Angeles"
- History of the Los Angeles Police Department
- Los Angeles in the 1920s
- End Poverty in California
- Ham and Eggs Movement
- Strikes in the United States in the 1930s
- History of the socialist movement in the United States
- First Red Scare
- House Un-American Activities Committee § Dies Committee (1938–1944)
- Freedom of assembly
- Freedom of association
- L.A. Confidential (film)

== Sources ==
=== Books ===
- Buelna, Enrique M. (2019). Chicano Communists and the Struggle for Social Justice. Tucson: The University of Arizona Press. doi:10.2307/j.ctvdjrpsm. ISBN 978-0-8165-4066-2. JSTOR j.ctvdjrpsm. LCCN 2018037379. OCLC 1091696572. Project MUSE book 64267.
- Cherny, Robert W. (2008). "Anti-Communist Networks and Labor: The Pacific Coast in the 1930s". In Stromquist, Shelton (ed.). Labor's Cold War: Local Politics in a Global Context. The Working Class in American History. Champaign and Chicago: University of Illinois Press. pp. 17–48. ISBN 978-0-252-03222-6. LCCN 2007020854. OCLC 137325093.
- Domanick, Joe (1994). To Protect and To Serve: The LAPD's Century of War in the City of Dreams. New York: Pocket Books (Simon & Schuster). ISBN 978-0-671-75111-1. LCCN 94019984. OCLC 30510259.
- Donner, Frank (1990). Protectors of Privilege: Red Squads and Police Repression in Urban America. Berkeley: University of California Press. doi:10.1525/9780520343139. ISBN 978-0-520-34313-9. LCCN 89020290. OCLC 20318551.
- Escobar, Edward J. (1999). "Chapter 5: The LAPD and Mexican American Workers, 1920–1940". Race, Police, and the Making of a Political Identity: Mexican Americans and the Los Angeles Police Department, 1900–1945. Latinos in American Society and Culture, Latin American Studies Center, UCLA. Berkeley, California: University of California Press. doi:10.1525/9780520920781. ISBN 978-0-520-92078-1. LCCN 98023322. OCLC 44965755.
- Felker-Kantor, Max (2018). Policing Los Angeles: Race, Resistance, and the Rise of the LAPD. Chapel Hill: University of North Carolina Press. doi:10.5149/northcarolina/9781469646831.001.0001. ISBN 978-1-4696-4683-1. JSTOR 10.5149/9781469646855_felker-kantor. LCCN 2018010264. OCLC 1054642945.
- Hopkins, Eugene Jerome (1931). Our Lawless Police: A Study of the Unlawful Enforcement of the Law. New York: Viking Press. LCCN 31031818. OCLC 1634083.
- Janiewski, Dolores E. (2017). "Chapter 5. Through a Glass, Darkly: The NLRB, Employer Counteroffensives, Investigative Committees, and the CIO". In Feurer, Rosemary; Pearson, Chad (eds.). Against Labor: How U.S. Employers Organized to Defeat Union Activism. The Working Class in American History. Urbana: University of Illinois Press. ISBN 9780252099311. OCLC 983465792. Project MUSE book 51849.
- Janiewski, Dolores; Judkins, Simon (2020). "Chapter 12. Fluid Boundaries: The Evolution of a Private-Public Security Network in California, 1917–1952" (PDF). In Churchill, David; Janiewski, Dolores; Leloup, Pieter (eds.). Private Security and the Modern State: Historical and Comparative Perspectives. Routledge SOLON Explorations in Crime and Criminal Justice Histories. Abingdon, Oxfordshire, UK: Routledge. doi:10.4324/9780429060991. ISBN 9780429060991. OCLC 1139023394.
- Kurashige, Scott (2009). "Chapter 9. Organizing from the Margins: Communists in Los Angeles During the Great Depression". In Koditschek, Theodore; Cha-Jua, Sundiata Keita; Neville, Helen A. (eds.). Race Struggles. Urbana: University of Illinois Press. pp. 211–230. ISBN 978-0-252-03449-7. OCLC 317922889.
- Lascher, Bill (2022). The Golden Fortress: California's Border War on Dust Bowl Refugees. Chicago, Illinois: Chicago Review Press. ISBN 978-1-64160-565-6. LCCN 2022937148. OCLC 1340958868. ProQuest 7072562.
- Laslett, John H. M. (2012). Sunshine Was Never Enough: Los Angeles Workers, 1880–2010. University of California Press. doi:10.1525/9780520953871. ISBN 978-0-520-95387-1. JSTOR 10.1525/j.ctt1ppwgj.
- McWilliams, Carey (2000) [1939]. Factories in the Field: The Story of Migratory Farm Labor in California. [Original publication in Boston by Little, Brown & Co.] (Paperback reprint ed.). Berkeley: University of California Press. ISBN 978-0-520-22413-1.
- ——— (1973) [1946]. "Chapter XIV. The Politics of Utopia". Southern California Country: An Island on the Land. American Folkways Series (Reprint ed.). Salt Lake City, Utah: Peregrine Smith Books. ISBN 0-87905-007-1. LCCN 73077787.
- Olmsted, Kathryn S. (2015). Right Out of California: The 1930s and the Big Business Roots of Modern Conservatism. New York & London: The New Press. ISBN 978-1-62097-096-6. LCCN 2015013928.
- Perry, Louis B.; Perry, Richard S. (1963). A History of the Los Angeles Labor Movement, 1911–1941. University of California Institute of Industrial Relations. Berkeley: University of California Press. LCCN 63020884. OCLC 1419722079.
- Reppetto, Thomas A. (1978). "Chapter 7. California: The New Breed (1901–1942)". The Blue Parade: The Turbulent Story of Policing in America. New York: The Free Press (Macmillan). pp. 224–254. ISBN 9780029263600. OCLC 3844146.
- Ross, Steven J. (2021) [1998]. Working-Class Hollywood: Silent Film and the Shaping of Class in America. Princeton, New Jersey: Princeton University Press. doi:10.1515/9780691214641. ISBN 9780691214641. JSTOR stable/j.ctv10vm23h. LCCN 97008462. OCLC 1241099369. OL 662951M. Project MUSE book 76618.
- Roth, Mitchel P. (2000). Historical Dictionary of Law Enforcement. Westport, Connecticut: Greenwood Press. ISBN 9780313305603. OCLC 43397170.
- Sbardellati, John (2012). "Chapter 1. A Movie Problem". J. Edgar Hoover Goes to the Movies: The FBI and the Origins of Hollywood's Cold War. Ithaca, New York: Cornell University Press. pp. 9–40. doi:10.7591/cornell/9780801450082.003.0001. ISBN 978-0-8014-5008-2. JSTOR 10.7591/j.ctt7zg7w. LCCN 2011038590. OCLC 753351179. OL 25033623M. Project MUSE book 24141.
- Sitton, Tom (2005). Los Angeles Transformed: Fletcher Bowron's Urban Reform Revival, 1938–1953. Albuquerque: University of New Mexico Press. ISBN 978-0-8263-3527-2. LCCN 2004026472. OCLC 57004063.
- Sjoquist, Arthur W. (1984). History of the Los Angeles Police Department. Los Angeles Police Revolver and Athletic Club.
- Smith, Robert Michael (2003). From Blackjacks to Briefcases: A History of Commercialized Strikebreaking and Unionbusting in the United States. Athens: Ohio University Press. ISBN 978-0-8214-1465-1.
- Stevens, Errol Wayne (2009). Radical L.A.: from Coxey's Army to the Watts Riots, 1894–1965. Norman: University of Oklahoma Press. ISBN 9780806186481. LCCN 2008035615. OCLC 680758071. OL 17100593M.
- ——— (2021). In Pursuit of Utopia: Los Angeles in the Great Depression. Norman: University of Oklahoma Press. ISBN 978-0-8061-6924-8. LCCN 2020053112. OCLC 1226076500.
- Wagner, Rob Leicester (2000). Red Ink, White Lies: The Rise and Fall of Los Angeles Newspapers, 1920–1962. Upland, California: Dragonflyer Press. ISBN 978-0-944933-80-0. LCCN 0944933807. OCLC 44654778.

=== Articles ===
- Auerbach, Jerold S. (December 1964). "The La Follette Committee: Labor and Civil Liberties in the New Deal". The Journal of American History. 51 (3): 435–459. doi:10.2307/1894895. ISSN 0021-8723. JSTOR 1894895.
- Babcock, John R. (May 12, 1989). "When Los Angeles Was a World-Class City of Corruption" (PDF). Los Angeles Herald-Examiner. p. A-19 – via Los Angeles Public Library California Index DB.
- Bernstein, Irving (February 1965). "Labor Relations in Los Angeles". Industrial Relations: A Journal of Economy and Society. 4 (2): 8–26. doi:10.1111/j.1468-232X.1965.tb00916.x. ISSN 0019-8676.
- Carney, Francis M. (May 1964). "The Decentralized Politics of Los Angeles". The Annals of the American Academy of Political and Social Science. 353 (1): 107–121. doi:10.1177/000271626435300111. ISSN 0002-7162.
- Cherry, Herman (March 1956). "Los Angeles Revisited". Arts. 30 (6). Arts Communications Group. ISSN 0277-9021 – via Internet Archive.
- Fuentes, Ed (May 3, 2012). "Spring Rise and Autumn Exit: David Alfaro Siqueiros in Los Angeles". PBS SoCal.
- Furmanovsky, Michael (1984). ""Cocktail Picket Party": The Hollywood Citizen-News Strike, The Newspaper Guild, and the Popularization of the "Democratic Front" in Los Angeles". UCLA Historical Journal. 5: 24–49. ISSN 0276-864X.
- Gordon, Walter Lear III (Fall 2012). "Loren Miller: The Red and The Black, A Political Portrait". Black Renaissance/Renaissance Noire. 12 (1). Institute of African-American Affairs (IAAA): no pag. ISSN 1089-3148.
- Hurewitz, Daniel (November 2006). "Goody-Goodies, Sissies, and Long-Hairs: The Dangerous Figures in 1930s Los Angeles Political Culture". Journal of Urban History. 33 (1): 26–50. doi:10.1177/0096144206291106. ISSN 0096-1442.
- Judkins, Simon J. (2016). "Citizen Surveillance: CIVIC and the Investigation of Vice in the City of Los Angeles, 1935–1938". California History. 93 (3): 75–91. doi:10.1525/ch.2016.93.3.75. ISSN 0162-2897. JSTOR 26412674.
- Landau, Ellen G. (March 2007). "Double Consciousness in Mexico: How Philip Guston and Reuben Kadish Painted a Morelian Mural". American Art. 21 (1): 74–97. doi:10.1086/518295. ISSN 1073-9300.
- Nel, Philip (February 2, 2011). "Syd Hoff's Teeth: The Leftist Satire of A. Redfield". philnel.com.
- Rosenzweig, Laura B. (August 16, 2017). "This Undercover Operation Helped Foil a Nazi Plot in 1930s Los Angeles". LA Weekly.
- Sanchez, Dave (Summer 1991). "Protectors of Privilege: Red Squads and Police Repression in Urban America". Recent Publications. Harvard Civil Rights–Civil Liberties Law Review. 26 (2): 658–664. ISSN 0017-8039 – via HeinOnline.
- Sullivan, J. Casey (October 2014). "Way before the Storm: California, the Republican Party, and a New Conservatism, 1900–1930". Journal of Policy History. 26 (4): 568–594. doi:10.1017/S0898030614000268. ISSN 0898-0306.
- Van Valen, Nelson (July 1, 1984). ""Cleaning Up the Harbor": The Suppression of the I.W.W. at San Pedro, 1922–1925". Southern California Quarterly. 66 (2): 147–172. doi:10.2307/41171096. ISSN 0038-3929. JSTOR 41171096.
- Viehe, F. W. (December 1, 1980). "The Recall of Mayor Frank L. Shaw: A Revision". California History. 59 (4): 290–305. ISSN 0162-2897. JSTOR 25158002.
- Young, Neil (December 2015). "Left to His Own Devices". Sight & Sound. Vol. 25, no. 12. pp. 48–49. ISSN 0037-4806.
- Zanger, Martin (November 1, 1969). "Politics of Confrontation: Upton Sinclair and the Launching of the ACLU in Southern California". Pacific Historical Review. 38 (4): 383–406. doi:10.2307/3637621. ISSN 0030-8684. JSTOR 3637621.

=== Government reports ===
- Nicolaides, Becky (October 2017). Los Angeles Citywide Historic Context Statement: Labor History, 1870–1980 (PDF) (Report). Los Angeles City Planning Department, Office of Historic Resources.
- United States Senate Committee on Education and Labor (1941). Violations of free speech and rights of labor: Report of the Committee on education and labor pursuant to S. Res. 266 (74th Congress) a resolution to investigate violations of the right of free speech and assembly and interference with the right of labor to organize and bargain collectively (Report). [Commonly known as the La Follette Committee Report]. Washington, D.C.: U.S. Government Printing Office. LCCN 41007073. OL 13510038M – via HathiTrust.
  - U.S. Senate Committee on Education and Labor (1971) [1940]. Documents relating to intelligence bureau or red squad of Los Angeles police department. Police in America. New York: Arno Press and The New York Times – via HathiTrust.

=== Theses ===
- Judkins, Simon James (2014). Under Prying Eyes: Repression, Surveillance and Exposure in California, 1918–1939 (PDF) (M.A. thesis). Victoria University of Wellington Library. doi:10.26686/wgtn.17007901.v1.
- McClellan, Scott Allen (2011). Policing the Red Scare: The Los Angeles Police Department's Red Squad and the Repression of Labor Activism in Los Angeles, 1900–1940 (Ph.D. thesis). University of California, Irvine. OCLC 837684679. ProQuest 3442998.
- Sjoquist, Arthur W. (August 1972). "[selected chapters]". From Posses to Professionals: A History of the Los Angeles Police Department (M.S. thesis). School of Police Science, California State University at Los Angeles – via Internet Archive.
- Thacker, Ernest W. (1952). The Methodist Church in Southern California in Relation to the "Social Gospel", 1928 through 1941 (Thesis). USC. doi:10.25549/usctheses-c36-667820.

=== Primary sources ===
- ACLU. "Land of the free: the story of the fight for civil liberty, 1934–35". HathiTrust. hdl:2027/osu.32435060090164.

=== News reports ===
- n.a. (December 3, 1931). "Bar and Pulpit Protest Acts of Police Red Squad". Illustrated Daily News. Vol. 9, no. 79. Los Angeles. p. 16. LCCN sn92055173. OCLC 26716041 – via California Digital Newspaper Collection.
- n.a. (February 13, 1933). "Where Vandals Wrecked Paintings". Illustrated Daily News. Photos by Daily News staff. Los Angeles. p. 3. LCCN sn92055173. OCLC 26716041 – via California Digital Newspaper Collection.
- n.a. (August 9, 1934). "Hollywood Stars Said to Back Reds; Los Angeles Police Captain, a Congressional Inquiry Witness, Makes Charge. Hearing Held in Secret 'International Complications' Feared as Result of 'Poisonous Testimony' Offered". The New York Times. Associated Press. ISSN 0362-4331.
- n.a. (October 15, 1936). "Black Legion Scare Is Dubbed a Publicity Hoax". The Modesto Bee. United Press. p. 1.
- n.a. (December 17, 1936). "Capt. Hynes' Wife 'Undivorced' in Legal Battle". Illustrated Daily News. Vol. 14, no. 91. Los Angeles. p. 7. LCCN sn92055173. OCLC 26716041 – via California Digital Newspaper Collection.
- n.a. (December 10, 1938). Taft, Clinton J. (ed.). "Red Hynes, Former Leader of Red Squad, Sent to Sticks". Open Forum: Newsletter of the ACLU of Southern California. Vol. 15, no. 50. Los Angeles. pp. 1–2. ISSN 0030-3429. OCLC 4098587. ACLUS_0734 – via California Historical Society Digital Library.
- n.a. (May 24, 1938). "Hynes Tells Ouster Plot [part 1 of 2]". The Los Angeles Times. p. 19. & "Plan to Oust Davis Aires - Hynes, Kynette Trial Witnesses - On Stand in Bombing Case [part 2 of 2]". The Los Angeles Times. p. 21.
- n.a. (December 2, 1943). "Capt. Hynes, Foe of Radicalism, to Retire Dec. 15". Section II. The Los Angeles Times. Vol. LXII. p. 18. ISSN 0458-3035.
- n.a. (May 18, 1952). "W. F. Hynes, Noted Foe of Reds, Dies: Long Undercover War Against Communism Waged by Police Captain Before Retirement". Section I. The Los Angeles Times. Vol. LXXI (Final ed.). p. 37. ISSN 0458-3035.
- n.a. (May 22, 1952). "W. F. Hynes Funeral Held in Los Angeles". Section A. St. Louis Globe-Democrat. Vol. 77, no. 346. p. 11. ISSN 2574-6642.
- Bloom, Hannah (August 2, 1952). "The Passing of "Red" Hynes". The Nation. Vol. 175, no. 5. pp. 91–92 – via Internet Archive.
- Boyarsky, Bill (January 20, 1991). "Big Brother in Blue". Book Reviews. The Los Angeles Times. ISSN 0458-3035.
- Dargis, Manohla; Scott, A. O. (October 2, 2013). "Scrutinizing Nature, Sorrow and Oneself With a Subjective Lens". Section C. The New York Times. p. 7. ISSN 0362-4331.
- Morrison, Patt (May 23, 2023). "How anti-union was L.A.? The LAPD once arrested a famous author for reading the 1st Amendment". California: Columns. latimes.com. ISSN 2165-1736.
