= Eva Shafran =

American Communist (1906–1944)

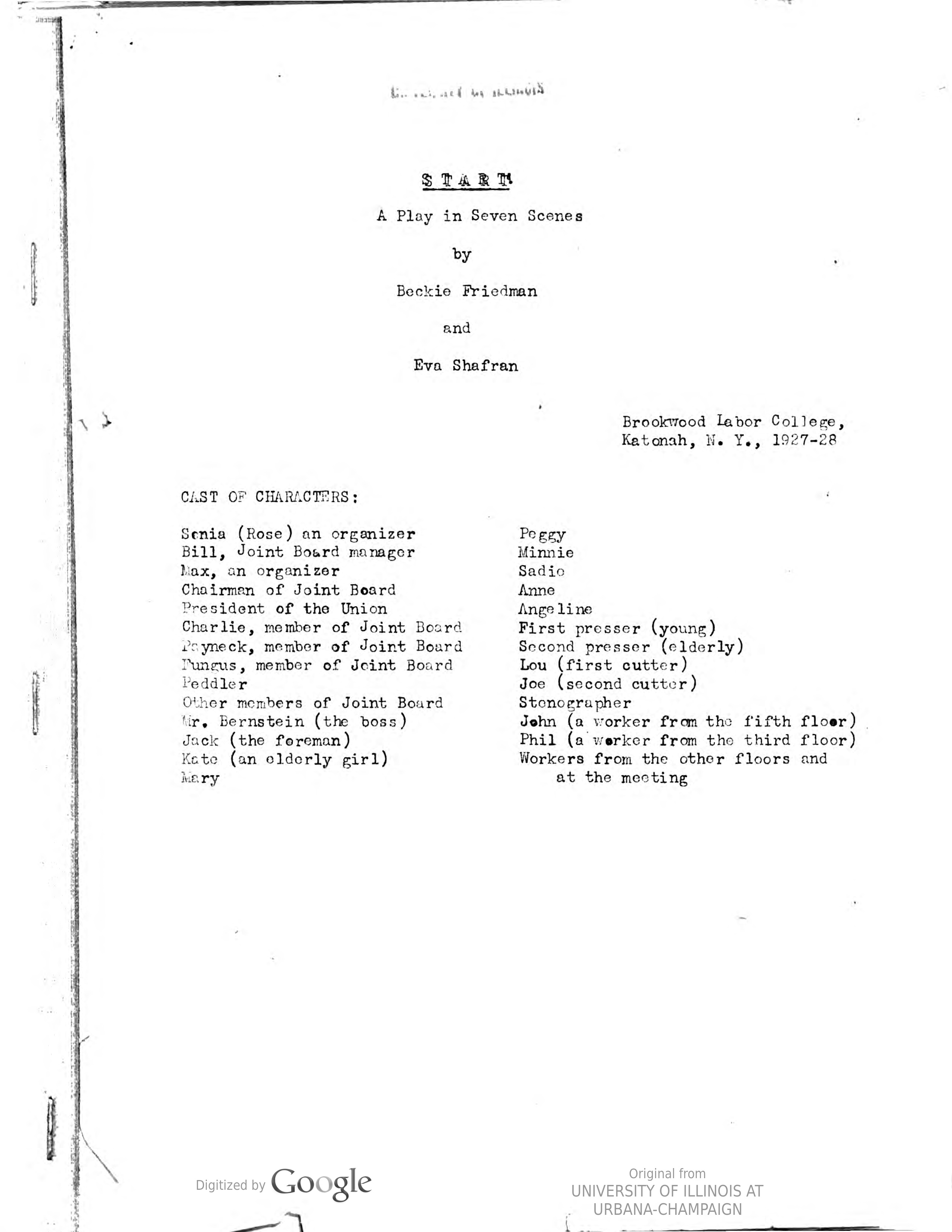
- First page of Start: a Play In Seven Scenes by Beckie Friedman and Eva Shafran at Brookwood Labor College, 1928 (University of Illinois at Urbana-Champaign Libraries)
- Born: September 6, 1906
- Died: November 17, 1944 (aged 38); Los Angeles County, California, U.S.
- Burial place: Mount Carmel Cemetery, City of Commerce, California, U.S.

Eva Shafran Burton (September 6, 1906 – November 17, 1944) was a Communist Party promoter who worked in New York and California in the early 20th century. She was known for her expertise in Marxist theory.

== Biography ==
Shafran was born in Poland or Russia in 1906. She immigrated to the United States in around 1915, when she was about nine years old. At the time of the 1925 New York State census she lived in the Bronx and worked as a bookkeeper. Shafran was naturalized a citizen of the United States at the District Court for the Eastern District of New York at Brooklyn on August 25, 1925. According to her passport she was 5 ft 2 in (1.57 m) with brown hair and brown eyes.

In February 1931 she was picked up by the LAPD Red Squad as she left the CPUSA offices and "was beaten so severely by the police officers that she was admitted to a local sanitarium". She was reportedly hit over the head "with an automobile crank". According to the Chicago Daily Worker, "A couple of weeks ago she spoke at a meeting of Trade Union Unity League metal workers, and, returning home alone, was suddenly attacked by one of the patriotic thugs of that city. The gangster leaped from an automobile, struck her down with a club, and, while she was lying in the street, kicked her in the mouth and knocked out all of her front teeth. She was in a hospital for ten days, but is now improved." In 1938 she worked as a millinery worker in Los Angeles and lived with her brother, Abe Shafran, a furrier, and his wife on Cummings Street. All three were registered to vote Communist Party.

A California state legislature investigation into Communism in California, published in 1945, put a spotlight on Shafran's biography:

"Eva Shafran merits particular notice in this report. For some time she was the active organizer of the Communist Party in Los Angeles County. She was registered as a Communist in Los Angeles County in June of 1940. She wrote for the Western Worker, West Coast Communist predecessor to the Communist publication, The People's Daily World. In October, 1936, she wrote an article for the Western Worker entitled 'The Socialist Party and Trotskyites.' In December of 1936 she wrote an article for the Western Worker entitled 'Unity of Negro and White Urgent in Maritime Strike.' Eva Shafran is known among Communists as an outstanding Marxist. For many years she has taught advanced classes on Marxism-Leninism in the Communist Workers' School in Los Angeles. According to the testimony of John Leech, former Secretary of the Communist Party in Los Angeles County (before the Los Angeles Grand Jury, 94369-8-15-40) Eva Shafran was transferred to Los Angeles by the Communist Party from the New York Workers' School in 1935 or early in 1936. She was immediately assigned to the California State Committee of the Communist Party and has devoted herself to the task of raising the political level of Communists in Los Angeles. Her name is variably spelled Shafran, Shaffron, and Shiffman."

California Communist Dorothy Ray Healey recalled in the 1970s, "I became a part of what in the post-Browder period was derisively called the Gods' Committee. That was the Communists who were in the top leadership of the CIO, who had a group together; it was mainly a class, as a matter of fact, taught by a woman by the name of Eva Shafran who died in '45. Really a wonderful woman, the only woman I've ever known who could take a current question and relate it back to Marxist classics."

Shafran was struck and killed by a streetcar in November 1944. At the time of her death her husband Don A. Burton was serving as a sergeant in the U.S. armed forces in China. Her friends organized a memorial in her honor.
