= Red Squad =

US police intelligence units

In the United States and Canada, Red Squads were police intelligence units that specialized in infiltrating, conducting counter-measures and gathering intelligence on political and social groups during the 20th century. Dating as far back as the Haymarket Riot in 1886, Red Squads became common in larger cities such as Chicago, New York, and Los Angeles during the First Red Scare of the 1920s. They were set up as specialized units of city police departments, as a weapon against labor unions, communists, socialists, and other dissidents.

== History ==
In New York, former City Police Commissioner Patrick Murphy traced their origin there to an "Italian Squad" formed in 1904 to monitor a group of Italian immigrants under suspicion. However, it is their association with fighting communism and socialism which provides the basis for the name "Red Squad." They became more commonplace in the 1930s, often conceived of as a countermeasure to Communist organizers who were charged with executing a policy of dual unionism—namely, building a revolutionary movement in parallel with membership in above-ground labor organizations. Similar units were established in Canada in this period, although only the Toronto police under Chief Dennis Draper used the name.

After the civil unrest during Johnson's administration, Watergate during Nixon's administration, and the public exposure of COINTELPRO by a dissident organization in 1971, widespread criticism of the Red Squads for illegal and undemocratic tactics emerged. In 1975, in the wake of both the Watergate scandal and the exposure of COINTELPRO, the Church Committee was formed to investigate overstepping on the part of federal law enforcement and intelligence gathering agencies. Following the recommendations of that committee, the U.S. Congress passed Foreign Intelligence Surveillance Act (FISA) in 1978, placing limits on the power of police and Federal agencies. This ended the official use of Red Squads.

Since 1978, the term "Red Squad" has resurfaced repeatedly to describe any action by police or Federal agencies that is deemed to be oppressive to a social or political group.

The term "Red Squad" has been used to describe New York City Police Department infiltration of liberal groups, first in preparation for the 2004 Republican National Convention and then continuing until today.

== In popular culture ==
The TV series Aquarius fictionalizes activities of the Los Angeles Red Squad concerning the Black Panthers and the Manson Family in the late 1960s.

On the NBC drama series Law & Order: Special Victims Unit, during the fourteenth episode of season two, titled “Paranoia,” Det. John Munch (Richard Belzer) mentions the NYPD Red Squad during one of his conspiracy theory rants.

In Martin Cruz Smith's novel Gorky Park, NYPD Detective William Kirwell is a member of the Red Squad.

== See also ==
- Domestic Security Enhancement Act of 2003
- LAPD Red Squad
- Patriot Act
- Surveillance abuse
- Will v. Michigan Dept. of State Police, 491 U.S. 58 (1989)
