= 1949 Los Angeles mayoral election =

- April 5, 1949 and May 31, 1949
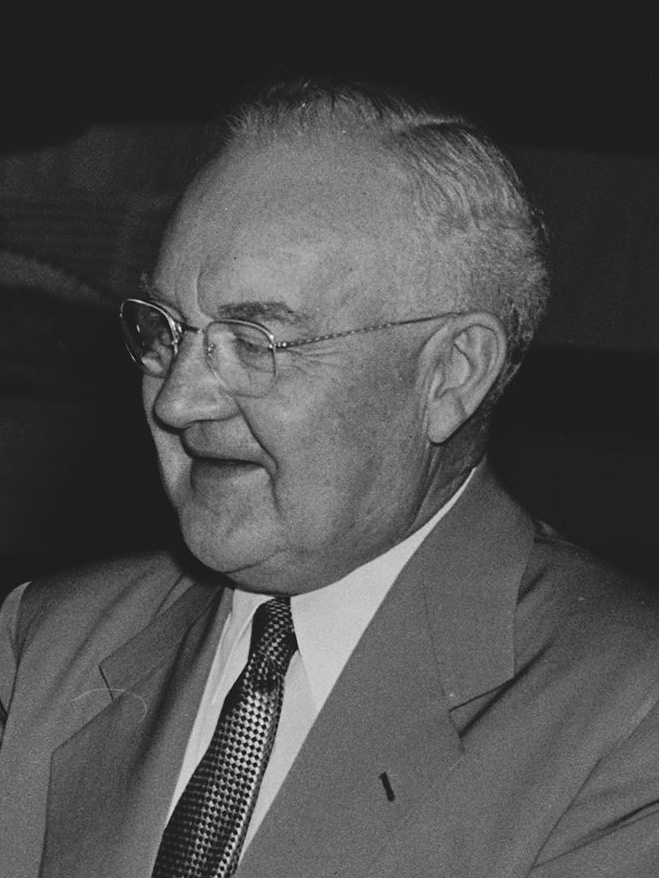

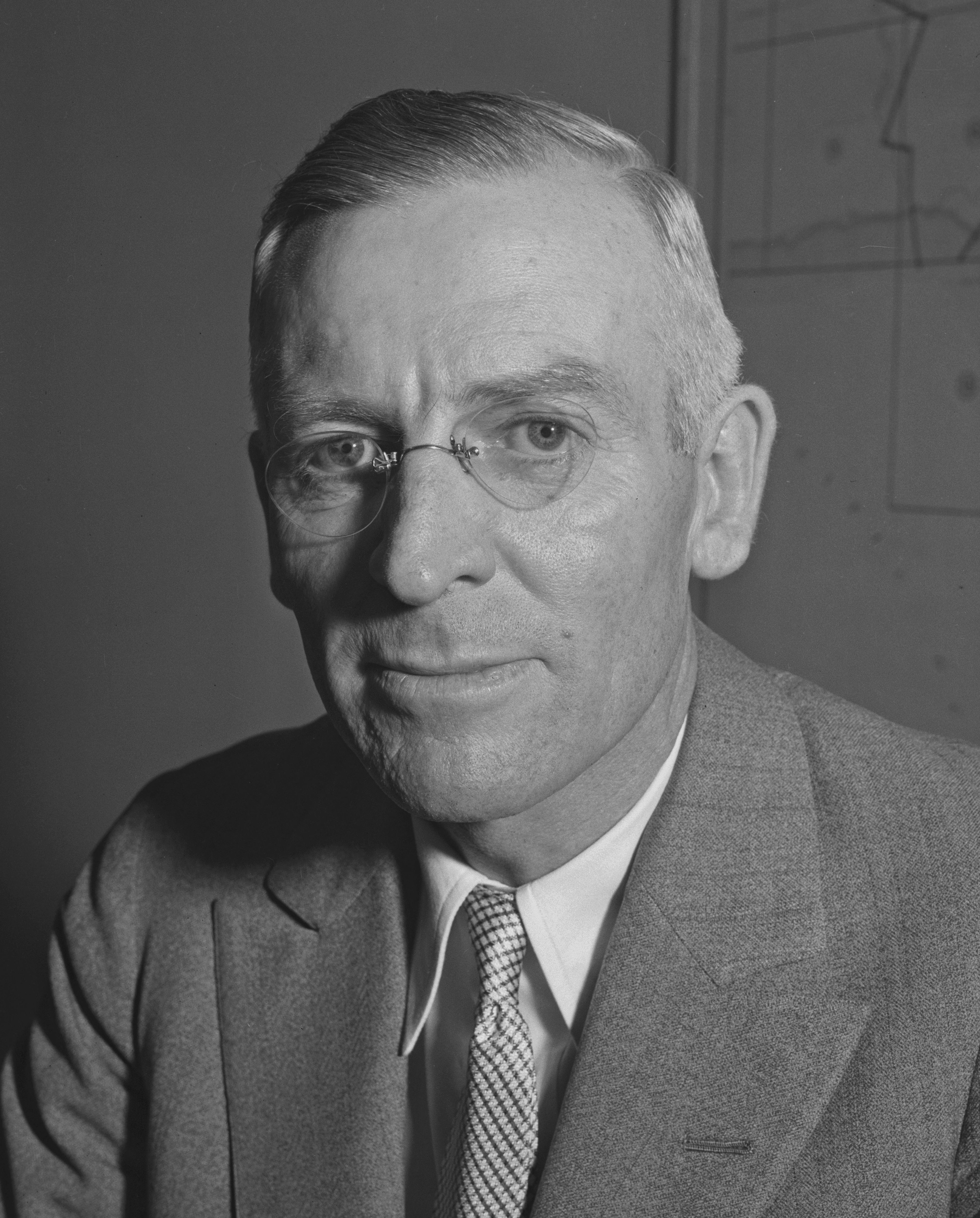

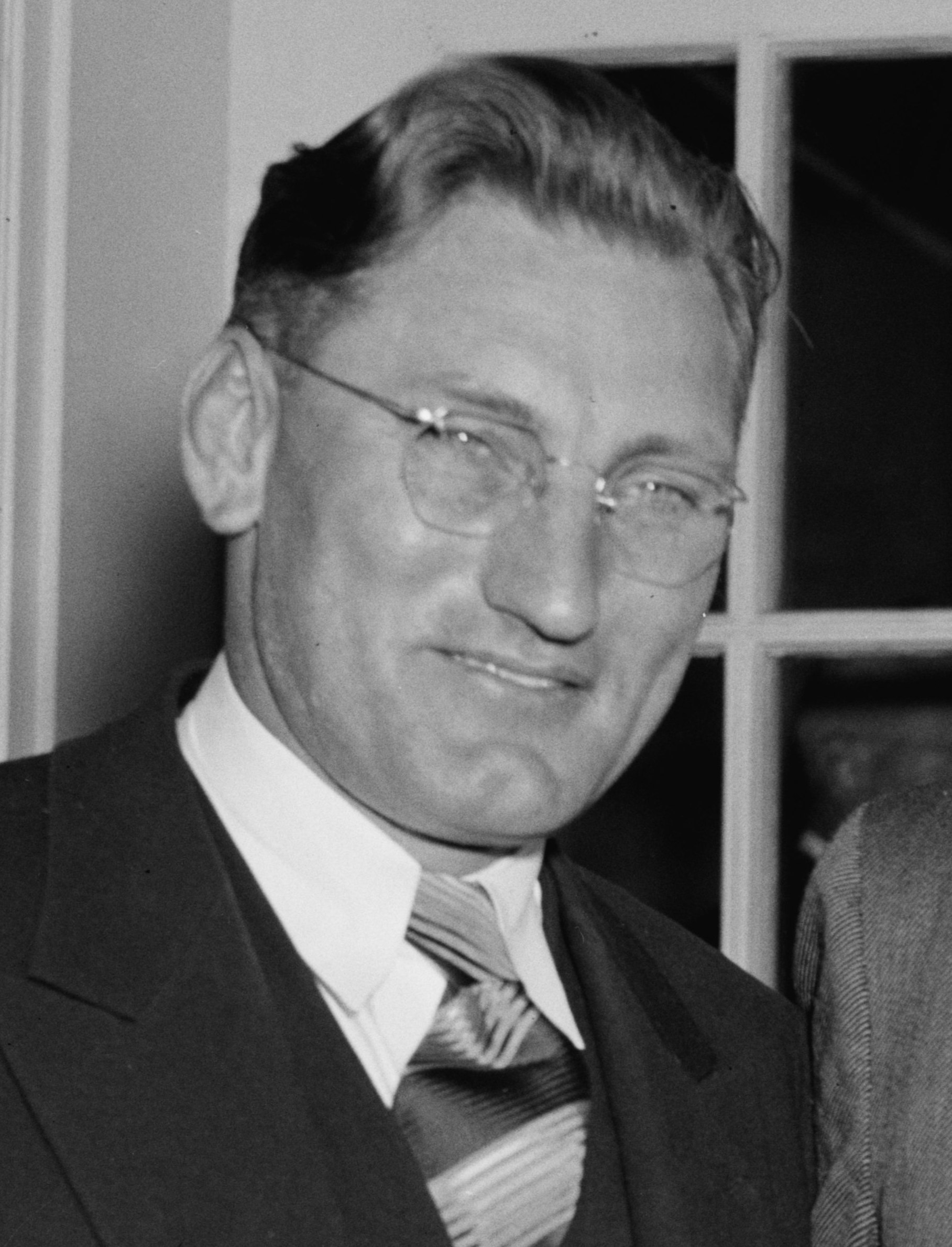

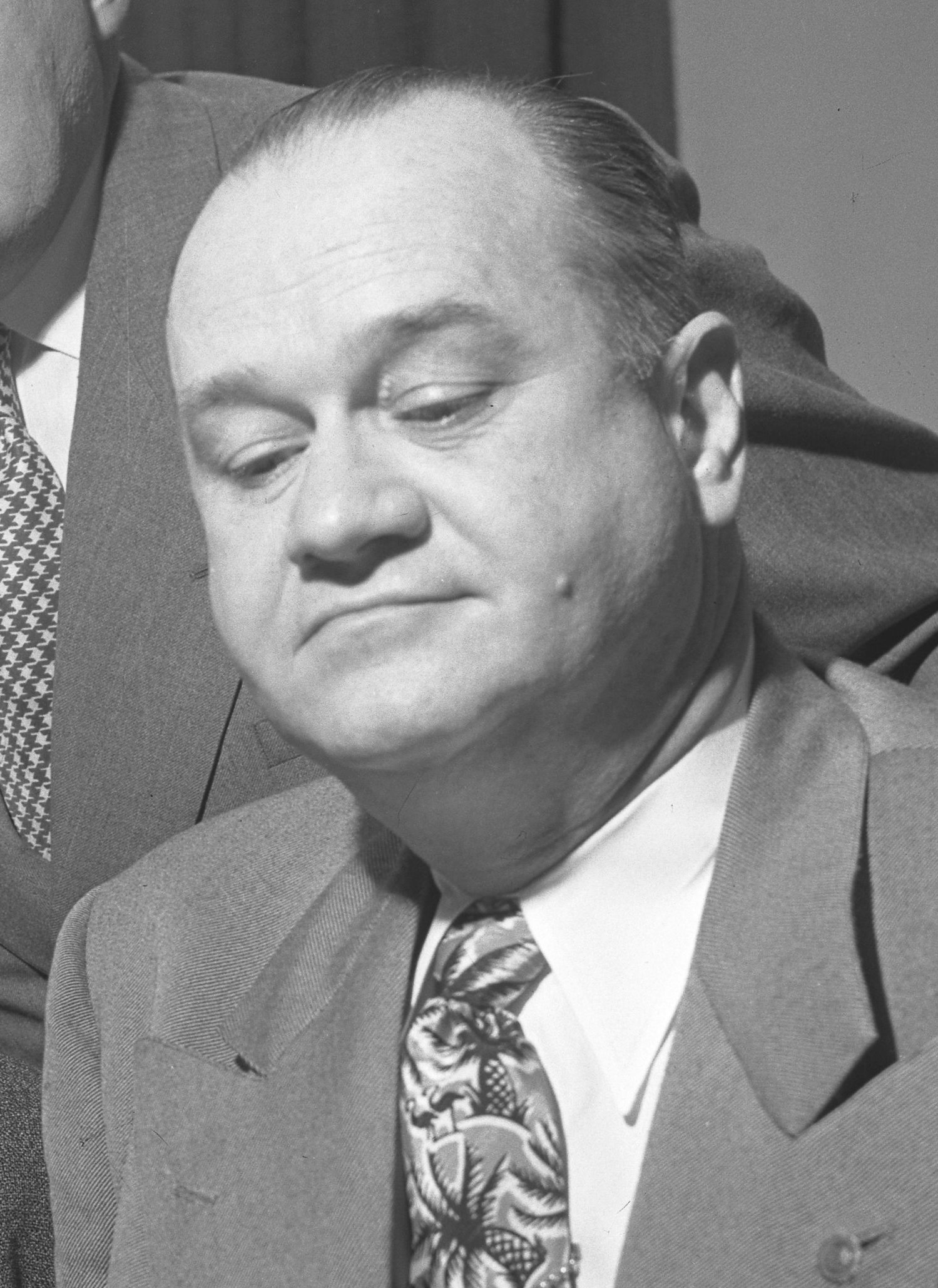
Candidate	Fletcher Bowron	Lloyd Aldrich
First round	179,929; 44.99%	87,766; 21.95%
Runoff	238,190; 53.48%	207,211; 46.52%
Candidate	Ellis E. Patterson	Jack Tenney
First round	57,286; 14.33%	48,162; 12.04%
Runoff	Eliminated	Eliminated
Mayor before election
Fletcher Bowron
Elected Mayor
Fletcher Bowron

The 1949 Los Angeles mayoral election took place on April 5, 1949, with a run-off election on May 31, 1949. Incumbent Fletcher Bowron was re-elected.

Municipal elections in California, including Mayor of Los Angeles, are officially nonpartisan; candidates' party affiliations do not appear on the ballot.

== Candidates ==
- Lloyd Aldrich, former chief engineer for the Los Angeles transit system
- William N. Attaway
- Fletcher Bowron, incumbent mayor since 1938
- Olin E. Darby
- Ellis E. Patterson, former U.S. representative and lieutenant governor of California
- Joseph E. Shaw, brother and personal secretary of former mayor Frank L. Shaw
- Jack Tenney, member of the California State Senate
- Joseph H. Thayer
- Myra Tanner Weiss, Trotskyist activist and candidate for mayor in 1945

== Election ==
Bowron announced his candidacy for a fourth full term in office, with State Senator Jack Tenney, City Engineer Lloyd Aldrich, and Board of Education member Olin Darby also announcing their intentions to run against Bowron. In the primary, Bowron and Aldritch advanced to the general runoff election. Tenney, the head of the House Un-American Activities Committee, was opposed by the AFL Central Labor Council and came in third. In the runoff election, Bowron defeated Aldritch by a smaller margin, with Bowron calling the election the "dirtiest in [his] experience," due to him and Aldrich being political enemies.

== Results ==
=== Primary election ===
Los Angeles mayoral primary election, April 5, 1949
Candidate	Votes	%
Fletcher Bowron (incumbent)	179,929	44.99
Lloyd Aldrich	87,766	21.95
Ellis E. Patterson	57,286	14.33
Jack Tenney	48,162	12.04
Olin E. Darby	18,806	4.70
Joseph E. Shaw	2,716	0.68
William N. Attaway	2,647	0.66
Myra Tanner Weiss	1,506	0.38
Joseph H. Thayer	1,085	0.27
Total votes	399,903	100.00

=== General election ===
Los Angeles mayoral general election, May 31, 1949
Candidate	Votes	%
Fletcher Bowron (incumbent)	238,190	53.48
Lloyd Aldrich	207,211	46.52
Total votes	445,401	100.00
