= Maryland Commission on Subversive Activities =

1948 investigative committee of the Maryland Legislature

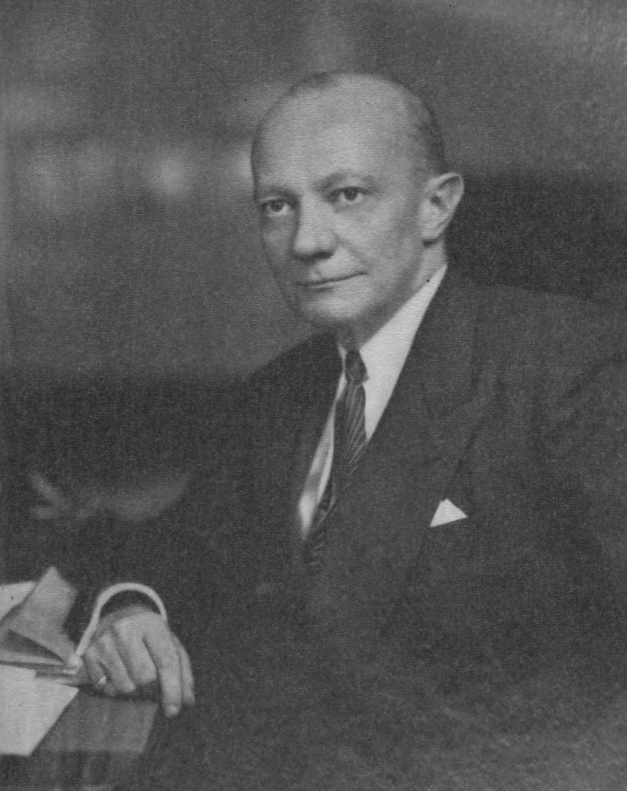
Maryland governor William Preston Lane circa 1950

The Maryland Commission on Subversive Activities worked in 1948 and issued a 1949 report to Governor William Preston Lane Jr. and the Maryland General Assembly. This work helped lead to passage of the Maryland Subversive Activities Act (also "Ober Law" and "Ober Act") on March 31, 1949, which went into effect on June 1, 1949.

== History ==
During its hearings, according to the Exploring History Podcast, the Ober Commission heard testimony from the FBI, from which it concluded that "2,700 Communist Party members resided in Maryland and that this dictated 'drastic measures'." The commission heard no testimony from the Communist Party USA or the Progressive Party.

On May 4, 1949, commission chair Frank B. Ober went on WQXR radio program "What's On Your Mind?" and argued for outlawing the Communist Party USA should be outlawed. He characterized the Party as not traditionally political but rather conspiratorial, with foreign links. Louis Waldman, a socialist labor union lawyer, supported legislation compelling Party members register. Paul J. Kern, a former president of the Municipal Civil Service Commission, declared the Party was no threat and supported free speech. Moderating was Delbert Clark of the New York Times.

The Explaining History Podcast calls the Ober Act "ruthless" and "a blueprint for repression." It argues that it served as "a model for other states eager to implement their own anti-communist measures." It sought to define and ban "subversive" organizations legally. O. Bowie Duckett, a Maryland special assistant attorney general, helped identify suspects for grand jury investigation. The act empowered Maryland to dissolve, seize records, and confiscate property for any group found subversive. It penalized members of groups found subversive with $5,000 fines and five years in prison. It penalized leaders of groups found subversive with $20,000 fines and 20 years in prison, which, the podcast noted, was four times penalties in the Smith Act.

== Reports ==
(These may well be the same publication, given their similar names; their content is disallowed to appear online.)

- "Report of Commission on Subversive Activities to Governor Wm. Preston Lane, Jr. and The Maryland General Assembly / Frank B. Ober, chairman" (1949)
- "Report to Governor Wm. Preston Lane and the Maryland General Assembly" (1949)

== Impact ==
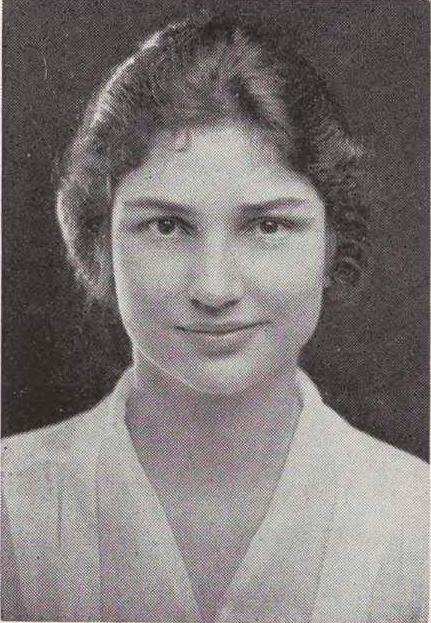
Miriam Esther Brailey circa 1922

In 1949, after the Maryland Subversive Activities Act went into effect, Miriam Esther Brailey, an American physician and epidemiologist at the Department of Pediatrics in the School of Medicine and in the Department of Epidemiology in the School of Hygiene and Public Health, refused to sign a loyalty oath. In March 1950, she lost her job.

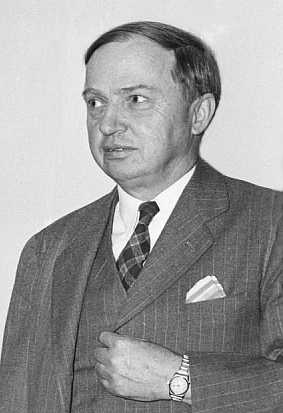
Harlow Shapley circa 1947

In 1950, Ober, a Harvard Law School alumnus, engaged in a public debate with the Harvard president James Conant over "academic freedom" when announced he would not donate to the Harvard Law School Fund. He cited Harlow Shapley, director of Harvard's Observatory, and John Ciardi, English professor because they had been "giving aid and comfort to Communism." As Harvard's The Crimson pointed outn, "Shapley had headed the World Peace Conference in New York and Ciardi had participated in Progressive Party opposition to the Maryland legislation." Conant replied and added a long defense from Grenville Clark, another prominent Harvard alumnus and member of the Harvard Corporation.

On September 14, 1950, candidates of the Maryland branch of the 1948 Progressive Party filed a petition for writ of mandamus against Maryland's Secretary of State. They were: Louis Shub for governor, Sam Fox for the US Senate, Marshall Jones for US House of Representatives (Fourth District), and Thelma Gerende, for US House of Representatives (Second District). They claimed their certificates of nomination had been rejected because none of them had filed affidavits per Sec. 15 of Article 85A of Maryland code under the Subversive Activities Act of 1949 also known as the "Ober Act." They claimed the provisions of the Ober law were invalid. Ogle Marbury, Chief Judge, delivered the opinion of the Maryland Court of Appeals, "It appears, therefore, upon reasoning and authority, that a state cannot in any manner impose additional qualifications upon a candidate for representative in Congress, but that any one who is qualified under the United States Constitution may become a candidate, subject, of course, to reasonable provisions of time and method of getting his name upon the ballot." Further, "Only the Supreme Court can authoritatively decide these federal questions." He concluded "The judgment should have been reversed as to both Shub and Gerende." (Marbury was first cousin once removed of William L. Marbury Jr., a prominent Baltimore attorney and lifelong friend of Alger Hiss).

== Context ==
Members of the New York Teachers Union noted in 1948:

Not the least dangerous aspect of the effect of the Un-American Committee is the pattern it has set for similar committees in various states. State legislatures in Illinois, Indiana, Michigan, Washington, California and elsewhere have set up similar committees. The most notorious of these committees is the Tenney Committee in California. It has sought to enad fifteen bills Interfering with the freedom of teachers and students, among them a proposal to ban from the curriculum all "politically controversial subjects." The Callahan Committee In Michigan has terrorized students and teachers. A good commentary on the thinking of some of our investigators is furnished In this Incident related by a Michigan student.

United States committees that investigated people for treason between World War II and the start of the Cold War have included:

State Committees;

- "Tenney Committee" or California Senate Factfinding Subcommittee on Un-American Activities (CUAC) (1941–1947)
- "Callahan Committee" or Michigan Legislature Committee on Un-American Activities (1947)
- Canwell Committee or Washington state Interim Committee on Un-American Activities or Joint Legislative Fact-Finding Committee on Un-American Activities (1947–1949)
- "Ober Committee" or "Ober Commission" or Maryland Commission on Subversive Activities (1948)

Federal Committees;

- "Dies Committee" or Special Committee on Un-American Activities (1938–1944)
- HUAC or Standing House Committee on Un-American Activities (1945–1975)

== External sources ==
- MD Information on S104-1 - (Subversive Activities File) - Maryland archives
- Maryland Commission on Subversive Activities, 1949 - J.B. Matthews Papers at Duke University
- Communism -- Maryland (2 committee reports) - University of Pennsylvania
- Maryland Commission on Subversive Activities report, 1949 – Romerstein (Herbert) collection, 1864-2011
