= Joseph E. Shaw (California) =

American political figure (1889–1965)

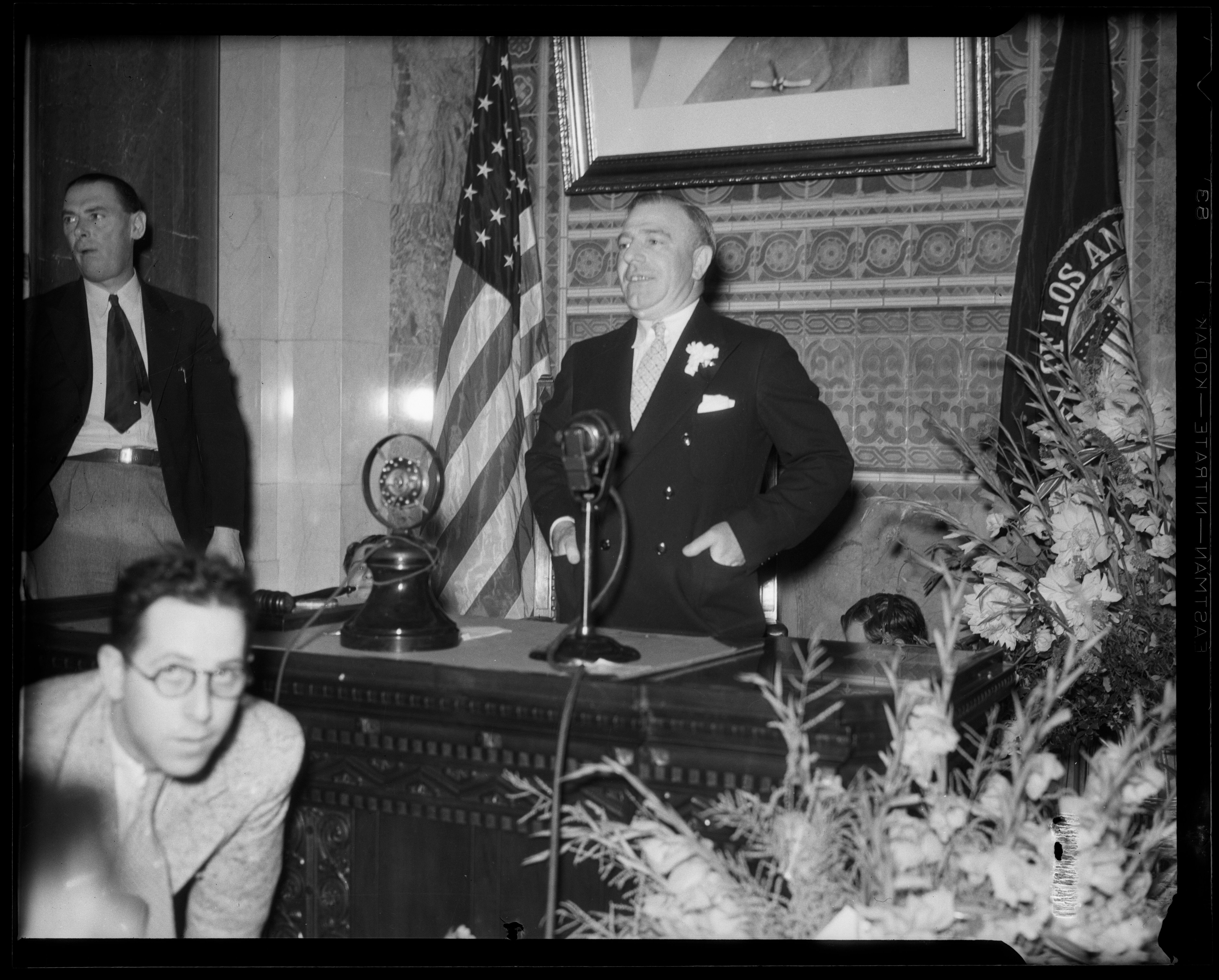
Joseph Shaw, personal secretary and brother of Los Angeles mayor Frank L. Shaw (Los Angeles Times photo via UCLA Digital)

Joseph Edward Shaw (February 25, 1889 – July 28, 1965) was an American political figure and U.S. Navy officer. He served during the World War I era and rose to the rank of lieutenant. His brother, Frank L. Shaw, was mayor of Los Angeles from 1933 to 1938. Joe Shaw worked as his brother's secretary and chief of staff during this period and "acted as the liaison with less savory elements of the alliance" that had elected his brother. In 1939, following the 1938 Los Angeles mayoral recall election that removed Frank Shaw from office, Joseph E. Shaw was "indicted and later convicted on 63 counts of selling civil service appointments and promotions. Joe Shaw served no time".

"The Lid Off Los Angeles," an influential series of articles published 1939 in Liberty magazine mentioned Joseph Shaw in its description of the city under the Shaw administration:

This, then, was Los Angeles in the years of Our Lord 1933 to 1937—a fantastic land of golden opportunity in which the underworld raked toward its vest the blue chips of gambling and prostitution while the Mayor's brother, boss of an administration supported by that underworld, figuratively stood on the steps of City Hall auctioning off everything but his own underpants. And if you didn't like it, he had a Spy Squad, headed by Captain Kynette, that would kick your teeth in.

Shaw was himself a candidate in the 1949 Los Angeles mayoral election; the Los Angeles Evening Citizen News reported that he sought to "revive the administration of the late Mayor Shaw in which he played a vital part". Shaw placed sixth in the primary and failed to advance to the general election. Shaw died in 1965 and was buried at Los Angeles National Cemetery.
