= 1953 Los Angeles mayoral election =

- April 7, 1953 and May 26, 1953
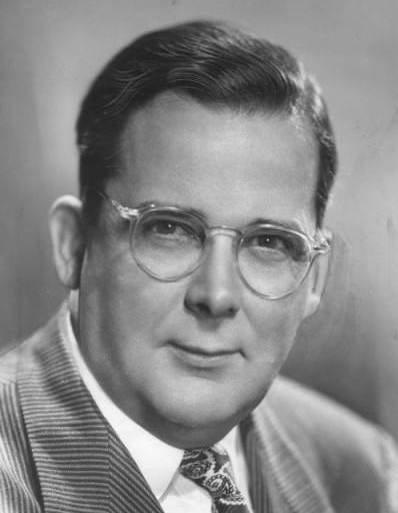

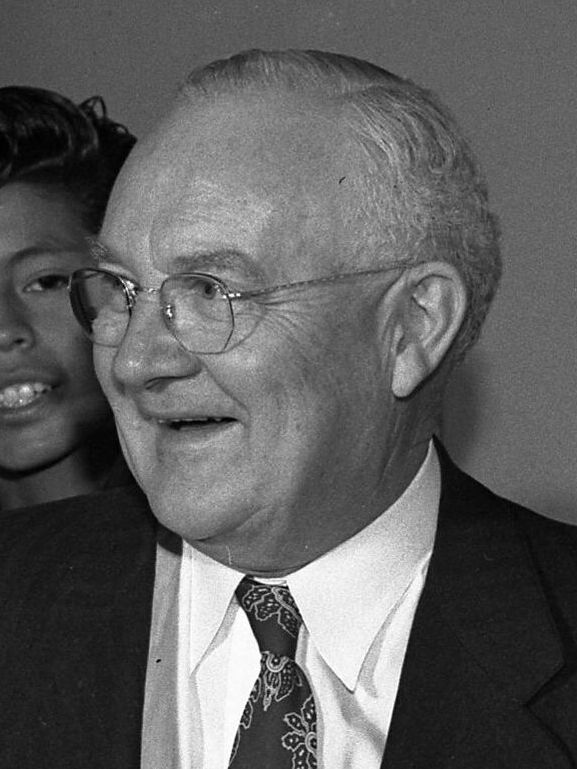

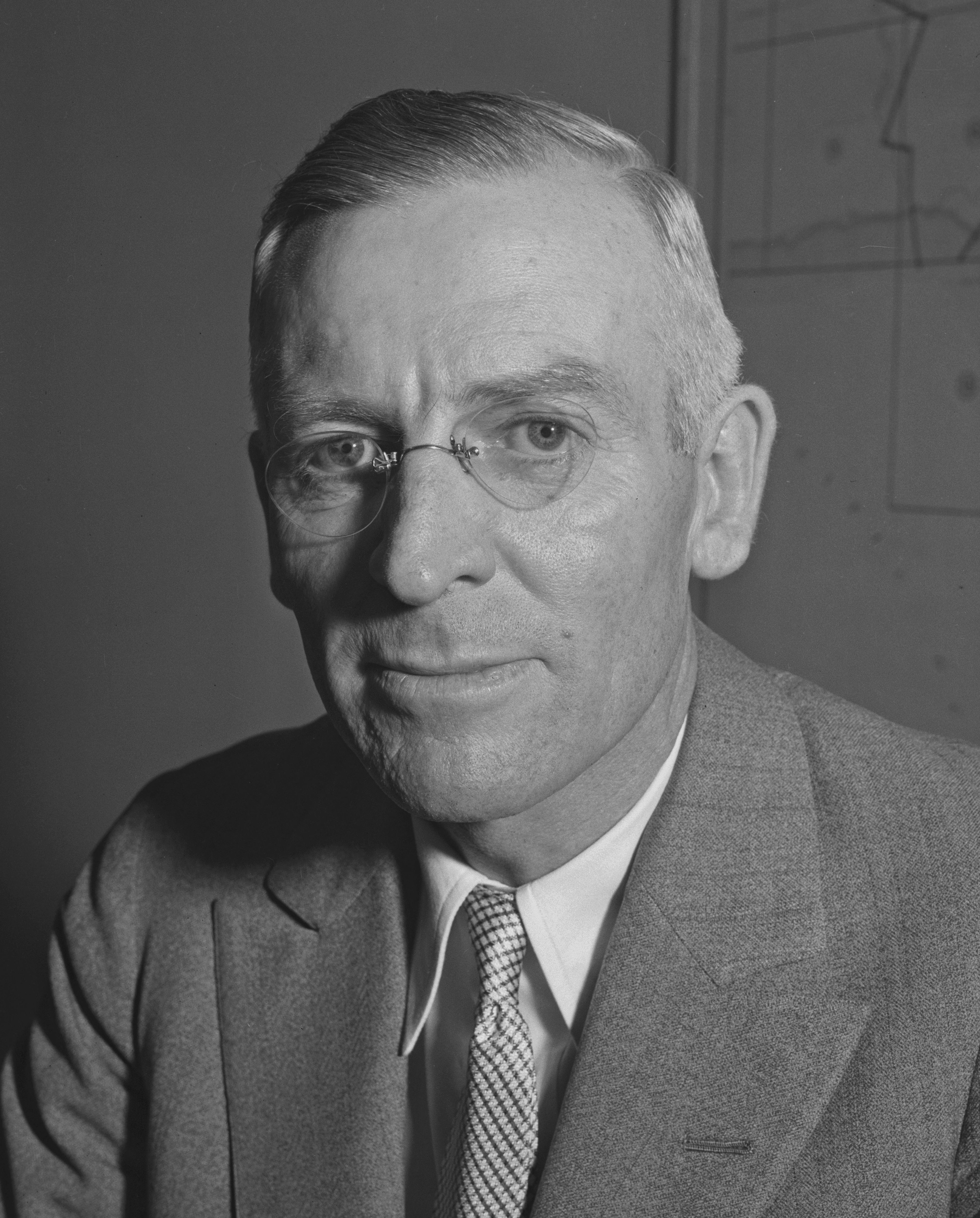
Candidate	Norris Poulson	Fletcher Bowron	Lloyd Aldrich
First round vote	212,668; 44.06%	179,205; 37.13%	70,823; 14.67%
First round percentage	287,619; 53.23%	252,721; 46.77%	Eliminated
Mayor before election
Fletcher Bowron
Elected Mayor
Norris Poulson

The 1953 Los Angeles mayoral election took place on April 7, 1953, with a run-off election on May 26, 1953. Incumbent Fletcher Bowron was defeated by Norris Poulson, a U.S. Representative.

Municipal elections in California, including Mayor of Los Angeles, are officially nonpartisan; candidates' party affiliations do not appear on the ballot.

== Candidates ==
- Paul Burke
- Lloyd Aldrich, former chief engineer for the Los Angeles transit system and candidate for mayor in 1949
- Fletcher Bowron, incumbent mayor since 1938
- Norris Poulson, U.S. representative and former state assemblyman
- Myra Tanner Weiss, Trotskyist activist and candidate for mayor in 1945 and 1949

== Campaign ==
Bowron had been the subject of various failed recall elections against him, including one in 1950 that said that Bowron was "guilty of 'false' representations or was 'grossly negligent' in his assurances [...] that he had rid the city of official corruption and organized crime." Along with Poulson, three other candidates joined to challenge Bowron, including Lloyd Aldrich who failed to win the runoff against Bowron in the previous election. In the primary, Poulson and Bowron advanced to the runoff election, with Poulson gaining more votes than Bowron.

In the runoff election, Poulson defeated Bowron to become Mayor, ending Bowron's tenure of fourteen years.

== Results ==
=== Primary election ===
Los Angeles mayoral primary election, April 7, 1953
Candidate	Votes	%
Norris Poulson	212,668	44.06
Fletcher Bowron (incumbent)	179,205	37.13
Lloyd Aldrich	70,823	14.67
Paul Burke	16,455	3.41
Myra Tanner Weiss	3,541	0.73
Total votes	482,692	100.00

=== General election ===
Los Angeles mayoral general election, May 26, 1953
Candidate	Votes	%
Norris Poulson	287,619	53.23
Fletcher Bowron (incumbent)	252,721	46.77
Total votes	540,340	100.00
