= The Lid Off Los Angeles =

1939 U.S. magazine article

"The Lid Off Los Angeles" was a 1939 six-part series of newsmagazine articles that ran in Liberty, an American general interest magazine. The series, written by Dwight F. McKinney and Fred Allhoff, asserted that the Los Angeles Police Department, in cooperation with officials in municipal government, had partnered with organized crime figures in the city for mutual financial benefit but to the detriment of the body politic. The article alleged police protection of gambling, alcohol smuggling, and bordello prostitution in exchange for payoffs by crime bosses, as well bribery, intimidation, spying, dirty tricks, ratfucking, and ultimately violence on the part of the corrupt LAPD to protect gambling-prostitute-bootlegging revenue for crime bosses over a 20-year period, ending under the administrations of Chief of Police James E. Davis and Los Angeles mayor Frank L. Shaw. Frank L. Shaw, who had been removed from Los Angeles City Hall and replaced with Fletcher Bowron by the 1938 Los Angeles mayoral recall election, sued the authors for libel, sued again for a different article in another magazine, and was later countersued by civic reformer Clifford Clinton for making false allegations. A jury in the first lawsuit was unable to reach a verdict. After lengthy court proceedings over several years, all parties settled out of court in 1943. The articles are considered very influential in the history of Los Angeles, and the title has been continuously reused in reference to crime and problems generally in Los Angeles. The title of the series comes from a statement made by Clinton in the wake of the car bomb that almost killed private investigator Harry J. Raymond; he announced he had information about the involvement of elected officials that would "blow the lid off of Los Angeles".

== Libel suit ==
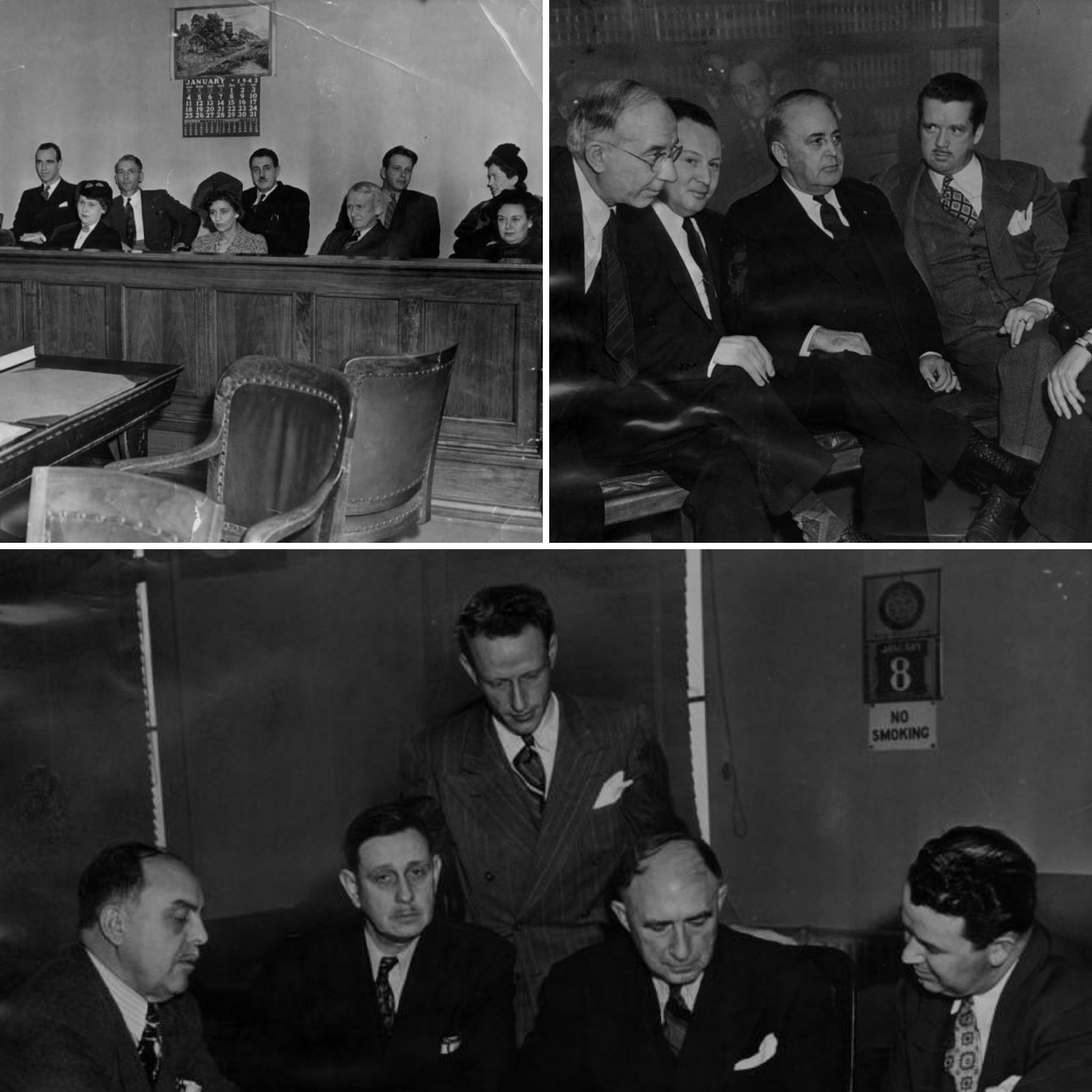
Los Angeles Herald Examiner photos of the 1942 libel trial; top left, the jury; top right, Shaw at center with his attorneys; bottom, defendant Dwight McKinney, second from left, surrounded by attorneys (Los Angeles Public Library photo collection)

Shaw filed a lawsuit in 1940 claiming he'd been libeled by the authors, and the publisher, and seeking upward of $650,000 in damages. In March 1941 Shaw added a suit against the "sequel" article Shaw files against "My Husband's Death Struggle Against L.A.'s Vice Czars" article in True Story.

The trial began in January 1942, Superior Court judge Charles Haas presiding. Among other things, Shaw's attorneys attempted to prove that civic reformer Clifford Clinton had had a major hand in writing the articles. Testimony about whether or not Shaw specifically or the Los Angeles city government generally was corrupt came from figures like Ann Forrester, a convicted brothel operator who was deposed from Tehachapi prison, and testified about the system by which she paid off Los Angeles police officers while in the company of Guy McAfee. Other testimony concerned whether or not Clinton was in cahoots with gambling-syndicate attorney Charles Cradick and bookmaker Jimmy Utley. After a total of 12 weeks of testimony, the case went to the 11-person jury in March 1942, the 12th juror having been lost to illness and personal issue. After four days of deliberation the foreman told the judge they were hopelessly deadlocked 5-6 (leaning in favor of the magazine) and had been since the beginning with no hope of resolution. The judge then dismissed the hung jury.

Clinton later countersued Shaw for making false allegations that he had been taking payoffs too; all parties settled out of court in April 1943.

== Series and successors ==
Sequence	Article Title	Subhed	Date
1a	Part One—A Dictatorship of Crime	Beginning an astounding story of corruption and vice in a great city—and a stirring battle against them	November 11, 1939
1b	Part Two—The Passing of "Good-Time Charlie"	More astounding revelations in an astounding study of corruption and vice in a great American city—and of a gallant battle against them	November 18, 1939
1c	Part Three—The Spy Squad That Floored Uncle Sam	Corruption, vice, a hidden dictatorship! Dramatically, a startling saga unfolds	November 25, 1939
1d	Part Four—Chief Davis Pulls a Boner	A new startling chapter in an amazing chronicle of crime and corruption in a great American city	December 2, 1939
1e	Part Five—The Fight...and the Stakes	Dramatic, sinister, heart-warming! A saga of crime and courageous men	December 9, 1939
1f	Part Six—Conclusion	The story of a gallant fight ends with a question—Will the job be finished?	December 16, 1939
2	Buron Fitts Defends Los Angeles	Liberty gives both sides! Without comment, here's a reply to "The Lid Off Los Angeles"—by the county's famous District Attorney	March 16, 1940
3	"My husband's death struggle with the vice czars of Los Angeles"	Nelda M. Clinton as told to Pauline Swanson in True Story magazine	January–February 1941

== Authors ==
=== Fred Allhoff ===
Fred Allhoff (1904–1988) was a magazine writer best known for his Liberty pieces. In addition to "The Lid Off Los Angeles" one of his articles was adapted into an Edward G. Robinson film, and his serial Lightning in the Night is considered an important piece of speculative fiction in the hypothetical Axis victory in World War II subgenre.

=== Dwight F. McKinney ===
Dwight F. McKinney
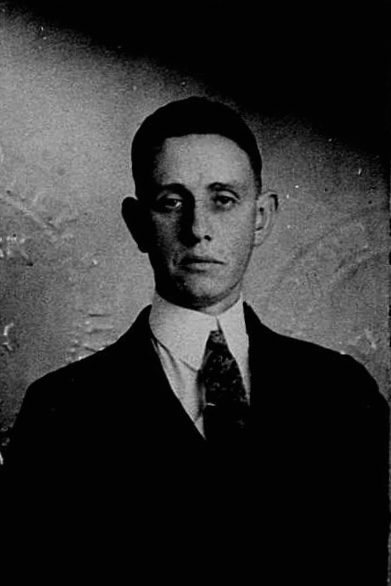
- Passport photo (1923)
- Born: Dwight Faber McKinney; April 2, 1889; Ottawa, Kansas, United States
- Died: November 5, 1979 (aged 90); Newport Beach, California, United States

Dwight F. McKinney was born in Ottawa, Kansas in 1889, as the youngest son of a Presbyterian minister and his wife. The family lived in Indiana for a time before they moved to California around 1898 for the father.

At the time of the 1910 U.S. census, McKinney worked as a salesman for a newspaper. McKinney may have begun traveling internationally on a sustained basis around 1915. In 1917, he was self-employed as a publisher in Los Angeles. McKinney served in the U.S. military from May 1918 until February 1919, as "Sgt 2 Cas Co". In August 1919, when he was involved in rescuing a baby from a house that had exploded, McKinney was described as a publisher with offices at Wayside Press . (Note: The explosion was the result of a bomb intended for former U.S. Attorney for the Southern District of California Oscar Lawler.) He wrote at least two humorous travelogues, Henery in the Orient and Seeing California with Henery. In 1922 he seems to have joined a research expedition to Baja California. According to the Los Angeles Evening Express, the expedition found four paintings that were supposedly buried around 1700 by missionaries, and "in an entirely separate cache of a dozen ancient coins of the time of Carolus IV and Philip V of Spain were discovered. Like the paintings they were thickly wrapped with cowhide. With them was a turquoise rosary, the medal carrying the image of a saint obsolete for such use in the Catholic church for centuries. This smaller cache is supposed to represent the private treasure of a fleeing priest." At the same time, the group filmed a colony of sea elephants on Guadalupe Island. The film was exhibited at the Pantages Vaudeville theater at 7th Street and Hill in downtown Los Angeles. Advertisements for the show promised "First and Exclusive Showing - Robt. M. Connell and Dwight F. McKinney's "SEA ELEPHANT EXPEDITION" Men Risked Life to Secure These Marvelous Pictures." A newspaper blurb that was published about the same time, about the fishing off Cedros Island, described McKinney as an associate of the Southwest Museum.

In 1930 he spoke to a community group in Santa Barbara about his recent visit to the Soviet Union and his observations of Communist system there. During the rest of the 1930s McKinney was a resident of Fresno, California, and worked at the Bankruptcy Referee office. As of 1942, his occupation was "writer - on his own". In 1957 he was scheduled to speak the California Cultural Club in Los Angeles about his "travels to trouble spots in the world". Circa 1970, McKinney lived in San Francisco. McKinney died in 1979, at age 90, in Orange County, California.

== Reception ==
The Los Angeles Times previewed the series on the front page of section two, commending the magazine for amply setting the stage with the historical background for the then-recent events like the Kynette trial, and commented, "Unlike Look and Collier's, which were satisfied with a once-over-lightly treatment of the sadder aspects of our citizenry, Liberty is digging in for a long winter of flamboyant and grating adjectives to describe our sin...the tempo of their piece is set early in the article, to-wit: 'To those who look shudderingly upon the terroristic activities of the secret police of Germany and Russia and ask whether such things can happen here, the answer is yes'." The articles were described by a business school professor in 1940 as "a fairly reliable account of corruption and the civic crusade which resulted in the recall of the mayor". A 2023 dissertation on the labor market in Los Angeles from the time of the stock market crash to the beginning of World War II called "The Lid Off Los Angeles" a "fascinating albeit sensational telling" of the events leading to Shaw's recall.

The articles made an "enormous impact," and the title has been continuously reused in reference to crime and problems generally in Los Angeles.
