= Mexicali Rose (song) =

1923 song by Jack Tenney and Helen Stone

Single by Gene Autry
- B-side: "You're the Only Star in My Blue Heaven"
- Published: March 10, 1923 W.A. Quincke & Co., Los Angeles, assigned to M. M. Cole Publishing Co., Chicago.
- Released: April 1936
- Recorded: December 24, 1935
- Studio: American Furniture Mart ARC Studio, 666 N Lake Shore Drive, 21st Floor, Chicago
- Genre: Hillbilly, Western
- Length: 3:07
- Label: Melotone 6-05-59
- Composer: Jack B. Tenney
- Lyricist: Helen Stone

"Mexicali Rose" is a popular song composed by bandleader and pianist Jack Breckenridge Tenney in the early 1920s, when he and his seven piece orchestra played the hotels and clubs of the Calexico and Mexicali border. The song became a hit in the mid-1930s, thanks to Gene Autry and Bing Crosby, around the same time that Tenney became a lawyer and was elected to the California State Assembly. Tenney was later appointed to head of the California Senate Factfinding Subcommittee on Un-American Activities.

== Background ==
Born in St. Louis, Tenney arrived in Los Angeles as a boy of ten in 1908 with his parents. During World War I, he fought with the American Expeditionary Force in France. Upon his return, he married Leda Westrem, a 16-year-old stenographer, and they had a baby while living at 3764 South Main street, Los Angeles. Marital problems ensued when Tenney became a professional musician in 1919, forming the Majestic Orchestra. He spent 1920 to 1923 playing dance halls and hotels in Calexico and Mexicali. Leda filed for separation on the grounds of desertion and non-support in July 1920, and was awarded custody and support. However, she was killed in an automobile accident in January 1921.

When bookings in the better Calexico places were full, the Majestic played less-desirable clubs in Mexicali. When the distraught widower was offered a steady job (now called a residency) at the Imperial Cabaret, Tenney accepted, and started writing his famous melody, which he initially called "The Waltz", then eventually "Mexicali Rose". People came to believe that the song had been named after one of the dance hall girls with a dubious reputation, called Rose Erskine. However, Tenney always denied this assumption.

Later in his career, he commented on the naming of the song: "There was an old lady who ran a boarding house in Brawley. Every 30 days when the railroad men were paid, she came to Mexicali. We'd play the waltz for her, and she'd sit around drinking and crying. She must have been 50 or 60 years old and weighed 200 pounds. I don't know what her name was but Jack Hazelip, my saxophone player called her 'Mexicali Rose.' I already had the tune and we started fiddling around with the words as a result of watching her cry."

The song was first played by Jack Tenney and the Majestic Orchestra in 1922, with Helen Stone on vocals, but there is no evidence of a recording being made. According to Tenney, "Helen Stone, the singer, liked the song so much that she put up the money for the first publication. I gave her half interest, and put her name on the number as the writer of the lyrics. It was a fine investment as we are still deriving royalties." After the song was published on March 10, 1923, it was recorded as an instrumental, "Rosa de Mexicali", by the International Novelty Orchestra on September 6, 1923, in New York. It was issued for the Mexican market on Victor 77255 in March 1924, with the band under the name Orquesta Internacional. It sold 13,936 copies.

Lewis James also recorded the song in September 1923 for Okeh Records. Tenney, however, turned his energies towards night law school, and moved back to Los Angeles in 1928. The 1929 sound film, Mexicali Rose, starring Barbara Stanwyck, came and went. He reportedly sold his interest in "Mexicali Rose" for two to three thousand dollars to the M.M. Cole Company of Chicago.

In December 1932, Tenney was elected to the lucrative post of president of Local 47 of the American Federation of Musicians. In October 1935, he passed the California State Bar examination and became successful in practice. He went on to be elected to the California State Assembly and Senate on multiple occasions.

== Gene Autry version ==
Good fortune came to the song over a decade after it was first published, when the publisher suggested that another client record it late in 1935. Gene Autry, rising star of Hillbilly radio and more recently, Cowboy westerns, had branched out into a third career as a recording artist. This had yielded little until a re-release of 1931's "That Silver Haired Daddy of Mine" became successful after Autry performed the song in two 1935 films (the science-fiction/western 12-part serial The Phantom Empire in February and Tumbling Tumbleweeds in September). Discovering a formula that would lead to many future successes, the song his partner and business manager Jimmy Long had penned in 1930 sold a reported five million copies by the decade's end.

Autry recorded "Mexicali Rose" on December 24, 1935 at the American Furniture Mart ARC Studios, 666 N Lake Shore Drive, 21st Floor, Chicago. Autry was still considered a hillbilly or folk artist, and his recordings were released on ARC's discount labels: these were Melotone 6-05-59 and Perfect 6-05-59 in April 1936, and later that year on Conqueror 8629 and Vocalion 3097. The song was included in the 1939 film Mexicali Rose starring Autry.

As with most of his early hits, Autry re-recorded it for Columbia Records on the 10-inch LP Gene Autry's Western Classics, released on February 3, 1947. Amongst several obvious differences, the latter version runs six seconds shorter than the original. The 1947 version was released on Columbia 37185 and Columbia 20086.

Due to popular demand, the original recording was also re-released in 1940 on Okeh 03097, in 1946 on Columbia 37002, and in 1948 on Columbia 20028.

"Mexicali Rose"

Single by Bing Crosby

from the album In An Album Of Cowboy Songs 1939
- B-side: "Silver On the Sage"
- Released: September 1938
- Recorded: July 11, 1938
- Studio: Decca Studios, 5505 Melrose Avenue, Los Angeles
- Genre: Traditional pop
- Length: 2:46
- Label: Decca 2001
- Composer: Jack B. Tenney
- Lyricist: Helen Stone

== Bing Crosby version ==
The song's greatest commercial success came in 1938, due to the airing and recording of a version by Bing Crosby. One report said, "Mexicali was around 10th among the best sellers and the recording was among the first four or five on the Decca sales list."

Between the 1923 publishing and the mid-1930s revival of "Mexicali Rose", composer Jack Tenney and publisher W. A. Quincke of Los Angeles transferred their interests to the M.M. Cole Company of Chicago. Crosby had performed the song on his Kraft Music Hall radio show on March 31, 1938. He recorded the song for Decca Records on July 11, 1938, and his version achieved success the same year. Crosby recorded the song again for his 1954 album Bing: A Musical Autobiography.

== Later versions ==
The song has been recorded by many artists, including The Lennon Sisters (1960) (Sing Twelve Great Hits, Dot Records DLP 3292), Sammy Kaye (1939), Ambrose Orchestra (1939), Wayne King Orchestra (1946), Burl Ives (1961), Teresa Brewer (1959), The Mills Brothers (1957), Jerry Lee Lewis,(1974) Deke Dickerson and the Echophonics(1998)
