= 1938 Los Angeles mayoral recall election =

- September 16, 1938
- Vote on recall

Results
Choice	Votes	%
Yes	235,395	64.65%
No	128,727	35.35%
Valid votes	364,122	100.00%
Invalid or blank votes	0	0.00%
Total votes	364,122	100.00%
- Mayoral election
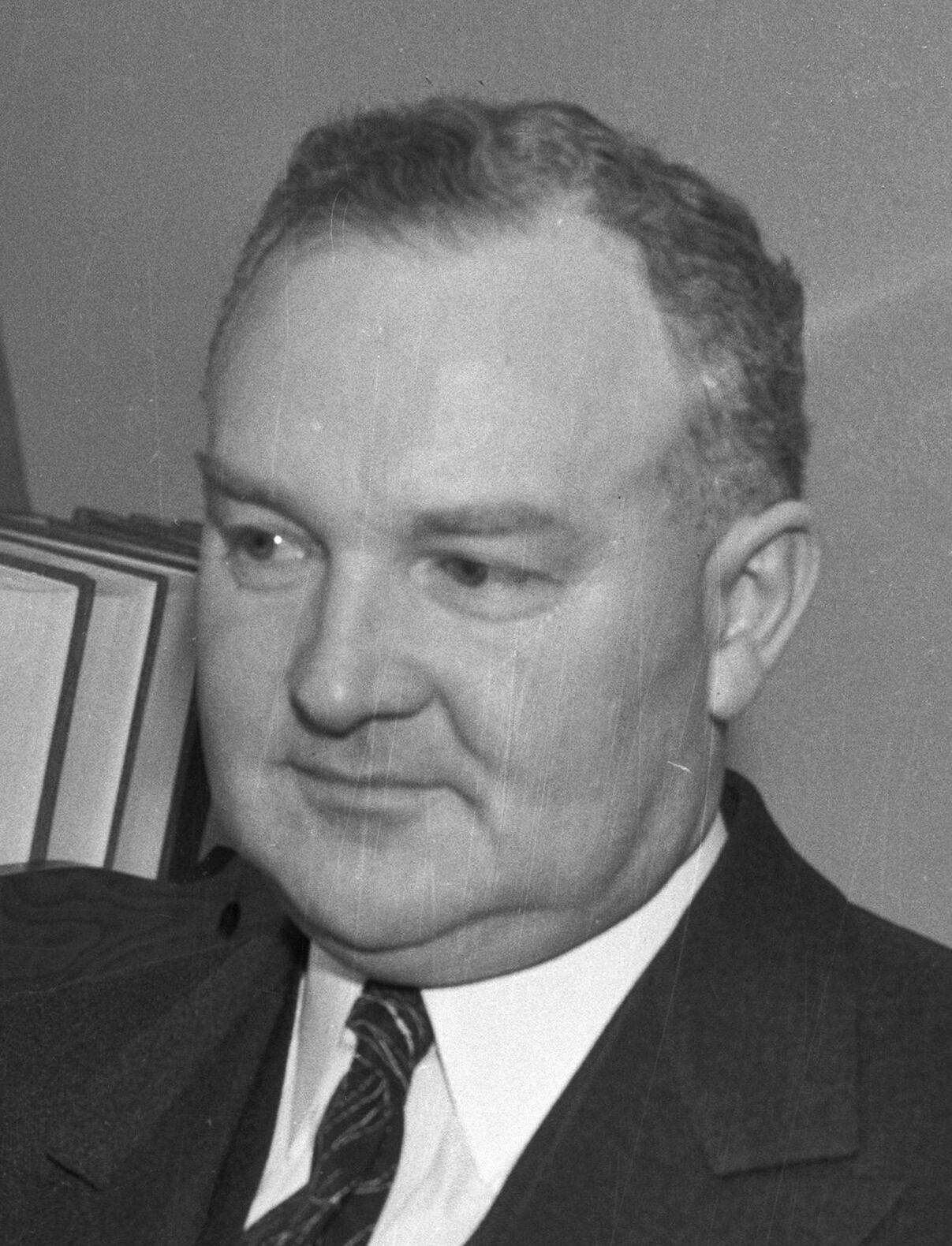

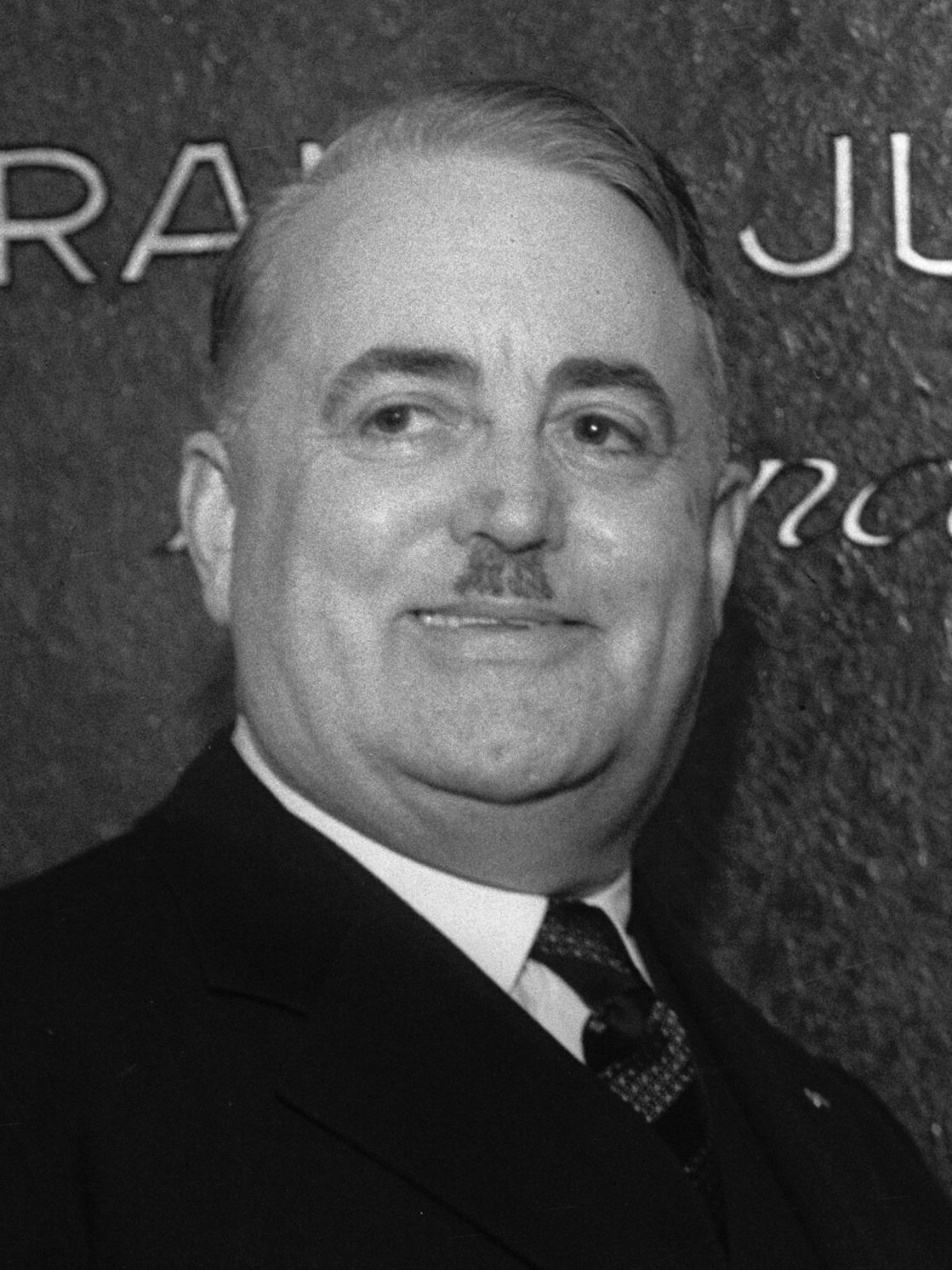
Candidate	Fletcher Bowron	Frank L. Shaw
Popular vote	233,427	122,692
Percentage	64.33%	33.81%
Mayor before election
Frank L. Shaw
Elected Mayor
Fletcher Bowron

The 1938 Los Angeles mayoral recall election took place on September 16, 1938, following the recall of incumbent Frank L. Shaw. Shaw was defeated by Fletcher Bowron in the election, making him the first recalled mayor in American history.

Municipal elections in California, including Mayor of Los Angeles, are officially nonpartisan; candidates' party affiliations do not appear on the ballot.

== Election ==
Shaw had been accused of corruption in City Hall which led to a recall movement against him and his close associates. Reformers who opposed Shaw and the Los Angeles Times both agreed that Shaw was "building the largest machine in the city's history," choosing Fletcher Bowron, a Judge of the Los Angeles County Superior Court, to run against Shaw. The reformers campaigned for Shaw's recall saying that he did not do enough to stop crime and that he had supposedly committed various crimes during his tenure. The recall was approved by voters by a large margin, and Bowron defeated Shaw by a landslide.

== Results ==
Los Angeles mayoral recall election, September 16, 1938
Choice	Votes	%
For	235,395	64.65
Against	128,727	35.35
Total	364,122	100.00

Los Angeles mayoral recall election, September 16, 1938
Candidate	Votes	%
Fletcher Bowron	233,427	64.33
Frank L. Shaw (incumbent)	122,692	33.81
Alonzo J. Riggs	4,050	1.12
Albert F. Osterloh	2,706	0.75
Total votes	362,875	100.00

== See also ==
- LAPD Red Squad
- Clifford Clinton
- "The Lid Off Los Angeles"
