= Fred Allhoff =

American magazine writer (1904–1988)

- Born: Christopher Frederick Allhoff; June 11, 1904; Dayton, Ohio, United States
- Died: November 11, 1988 (aged 84); Dade County, Florida, U.S.

Fred Allhoff (June 11, 1904 – November 11, 1988) was an American magazine writer best known for his Liberty pieces in the 1930s and 1940s. The corruption exposé "The Lid Off Los Angeles" (1939) is considered influential in the history of that city, another crime series was adapted into an Edward G. Robinson film, and his speculative fiction serial Lightning in the Night (1940) is considered a significant and early example of the hypothetical Axis victory in World War II subgenre.

== Biography ==
Allhoff was born Charles Frederick Allhoff in Dayton, Ohio in 1904. He was an only child, his father was a bookkeeper for a printing company, and then an insurance agent. His mother died when he was young and his maternal aunt moved in to help raise him. In 1930, at age 25, Fred Allhoff was employed as a newspaper reporter in Dayton and/or Cleveland, Ohio. Allhoff got married in 1931 in New York City. A 1936 article series for Liberty called "Tracking New York's Crime Barons" became the 1938 Edward G. Robinson picture I Am the Law. In 1939 he cowrote the six-part corruption exposé "The Lid Off Los Angeles" and in 1940 he wrote the 13-part "What if Hitler won?" series "Lightning in the Night", both for Liberty. "The Lid Off Los Angeles" triggered a libel lawsuit that was settled out of court in 1943.

Allhoff and his wife lived on Long Island in 1940; his work was "writer". Allhoff's wife Pauline died of illness in New York in 1944. Allhoff moved to Coral Gables, Florida in 1945, where he continued to work as a writer. Around 1948, Allhoff and his new wife bought 16 acres near the Caloosahatchee River. In 1950, he was living in Lee, Florida, with his second wife, and working as a fiction writer. He may have gone into the real estate business in Miami in the 1960s. Lightning in the Night was republished in book form in 1979. Allhoff died in Florida in 1988.
