= California Senate Factfinding Subcommittee on Un-American Activities =

20th-century body of the California State Legislature

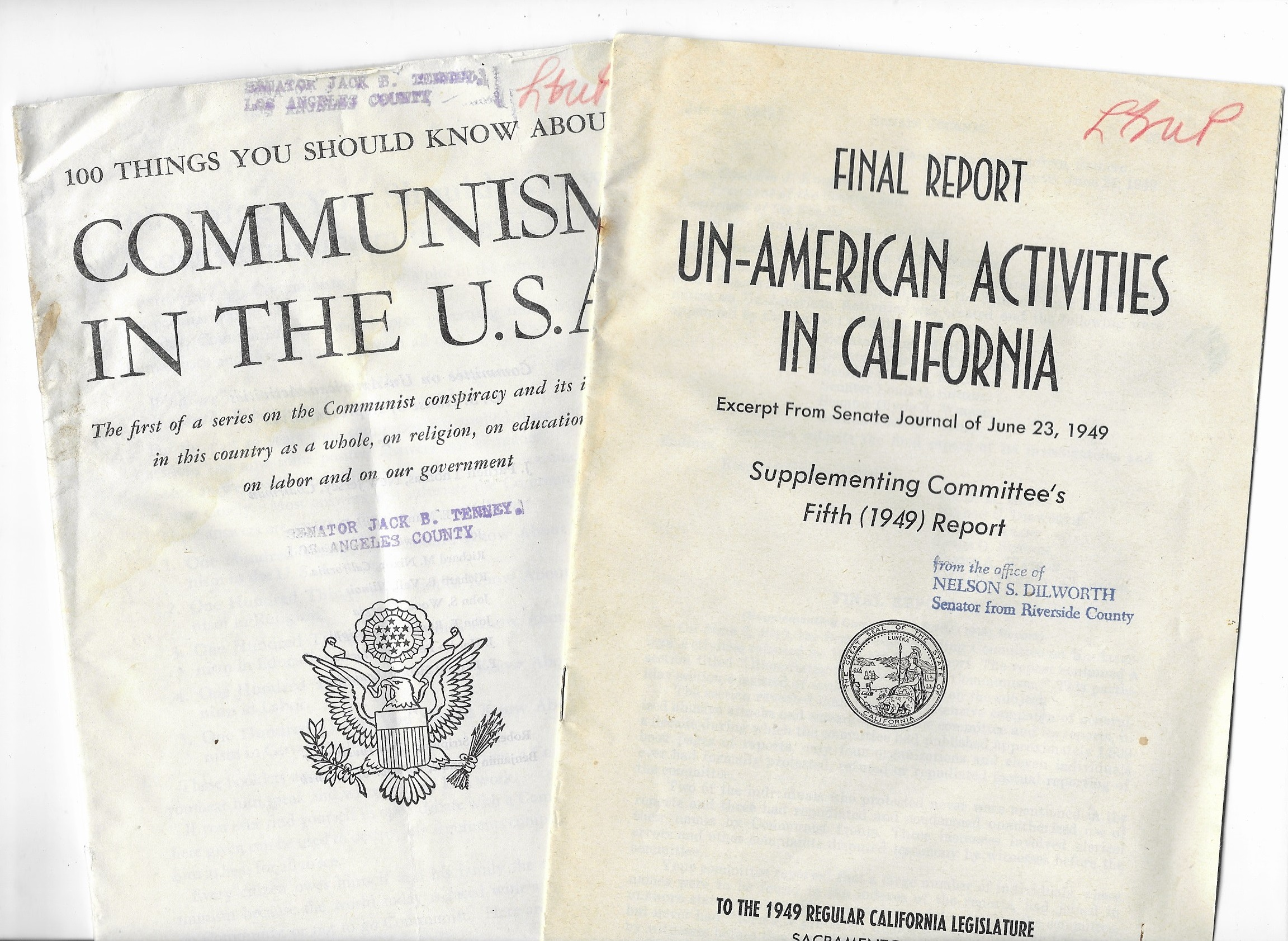
The covers of reports by the U.S. House UnAmerican Activities Committee and the California UnAmerican Activities Committee.

California Senate Factfinding Subcommittee on Un-American Activities (CUAC) was established by the California State Legislature in 1941 as the Joint Fact-Finding Committee on UnAmerican Activities. The creation of the new joint committee (with members from both the State Senate and State Assembly) followed the publication of reports from two legislative committees that had investigated allegations about the administration of programs at the California State Relief Administration.

In 1947, the California State Assembly ended its participation and the committee was reorganized by the California State Senate under authority of the Rules Committee of the State Senate as a subcommittee of the General Research Committee. CUAC was the California equivalent of the House Committee on Un-American Activities.

The Committee operated until 1970, publishing a total of 15 reports (called "Red Books" within state government) on a variety of topics including Nazi attempts to infiltrate California industry, alleged Communist front organizations, the John Birch Society, the Black Panthers, Cesar Chavez, and 1960s student protests.

== History ==
From 1941 through 1949 the committee was known commonly as the Tenney Committee for its chairman, Senator Jack Tenney, who was notable for his vigorous investigations of Communists. In 1951, Tenney and the other members of the committee were sued by William Patrick Brandhove who alleged that they had violated his civil rights after he was charged with contempt after refusing to testify under oath at a hearing. Brandhove claimed that the hearing "was not held for a legislative purpose," but was instead conducted "to intimidate and silence" him. The case, Tenney v. Brandhove 341 U.S. 367 (1951), was heard by the US Supreme Court which found that under the circumstances of the case, the committee and its individual members were acting in the sphere of legitimate legislative activities in calling the plaintiff before it and examining him and the civil rights statute did not create a civil liability for such conduct.

In March 1943, the report of the committee deals extensively with the activities of "enemy aliens", and was supportive of their internment.

The 12th report of the Subcommittee was published in 1963, and included investigation of the Communist Party, the Constitutional Liberties Information Center, so-called Front groups and Black Muslims. The committee conducted an investigation of the John Birch Society, examining its literature, sent investigators to talk with supporters and critics, examined press accounts and worked for two years. On June 12, 1963, the subcommittee filed its 62-page report and released copies to the press.

The 13th Report Supplement of the Subcommittee appeared in 1966 with information gathered on the Kerr Analysis of the situation on the UC Berkeley campus; on Martin Kamen; Chancellor Edward W. Strong; The Filthy Speech Movement; Clara Ontell; Virginia Taylor Norris; Campus Speakers; Margaret Gelders Frantz; The Young People's Socialist League; Sam Kagel; Present Kerr and the Regents; and had chapter headings such as; "Radical Groups Capitalize on Rule Weaknesses"; "Pious Disclaimers'; "Half-Truths and Distortions"; "Telescoping of Time"; Leon Wofsy; Douglas Wachter; The Element of Time; "Guilt by Juxtaposition"; Developments since July, 1965; The Vietnam Day Committee; Old Leaders - New Cause; Teach-In at Berkeley, May, 1965; Demonstrations on October 15 and 16, 1965; Demonstration on November 20, 1965; Berkeley Campus Softened Up; Comfort for the Enemy; Vietnam Propaganda at Garfield Junior High School; Chancellor Heyns Discusses the Demonstrations; International Control and Collaboration; The San Francisco Mime Troupe; Vietnam Day Committee Dance March 25, 1966; Homosexuality; The Eli Katz Case.

The 14th report of the committee was published in 1967 and although it claimed to deal with the Delano grape strike, it was an anti-communist and anti-"subversive" effort on behalf of state government. While the committee reports stated that no inference of subversive activity should be construed by mention of a person or organization in their reports, the result was less circumspect. The report of 1967 claimed that agricultural labor had been a target of Communist infiltration for thirty years due to the migratory and deprived state of agricultural workers. Chapters included the Delano Grape Strike, Spring Mobilization, The Community for New Politics, Responses from Virginia Norris Taylor and other exhibits.

Documents in the Committee files (today held by the California State Archives) span the period from 1932 to 1971. A large directory (24 cubic feet) of names is on index cards for the paper files and a separate name indexes for hearings and targeted organizations. 28 cubic feet of filed records include newspaper clippings, publications (booklets, circulars, posters, etc.), membership lists, lists of license plates (names, auto type/year) of cars parked near suspicious meetings (including May Day events), subscriptions to publications, organizations (peace, churches, student, youth, foreigners, union/labor, etc.), anonymous reports, meetings/lectures, photos, handwritten notes, phone messages, etc.

== Context ==
United States committees that investigated people for treason between World War II and the start of the Cold War have included:

State Committees;

- Tenney Committee or California Senate Factfinding Subcommittee on Un-American Activities (CUAC) (1941-1947)
- Michigan Legislature Committee on Un-American Activities (1947)
- Canwell Committee or Washington state Interim Committee on Un-American Activities or Joint Legislative Fact-Finding Committee on Un-American Activities (1947-1949)
- Maryland Commission on Subversive Activities (1948)

Federal Committees;

- Dies Committee or Special Committee on Un-American Activities (1938–1944)
- HUAC or Standing House Committee on Un-American Activities (1945–1975)

== See also ==
- Lusk Committee
- Mundt–Ferguson Communist Registration Bill
