= Jack Tenney =

American politician (1898–1970)

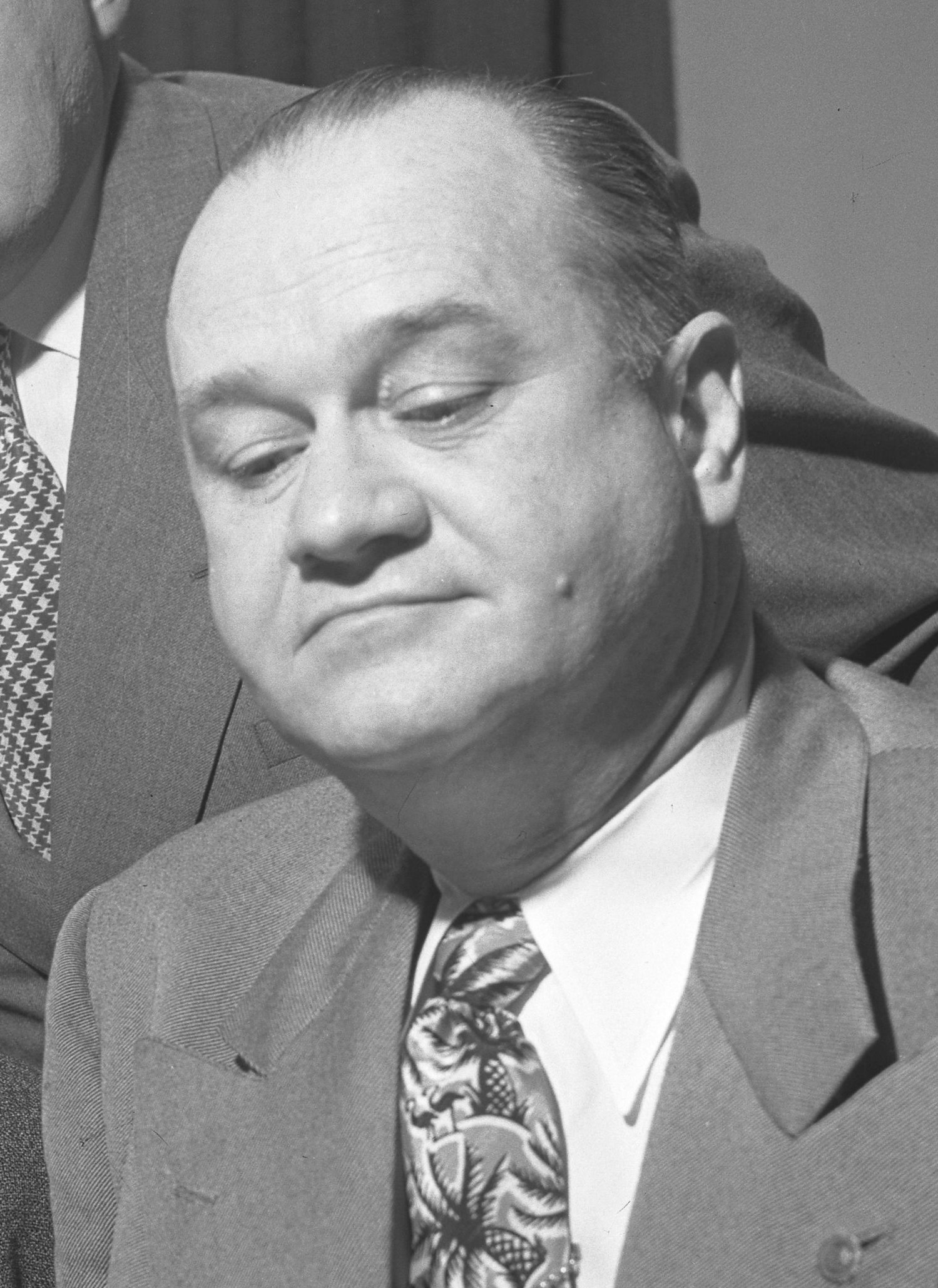
- Tenney, circa 1947

Member of the California Senate from the 38th district
- In office January 4, 1943 – January 3, 1955
- Preceded by: Robert W. Kenny
- Succeeded by: Richard B. Richards

Member of the California State Assembly from the 46th district
- In office January 4, 1937 – January 4, 1943
- Preceded by: Ralph W. Evans
- Succeeded by: Glenn M. Anderson

Personal details
- Born: April 1, 1898 St. Louis, Missouri, US
- Died: November 4, 1970 (aged 72) Glendale, California, US
- Party: Republican (after 1944); Democratic (before 1944)
- Spouse(s): Leda Westrem; Florence Gruber; Linnie G. Wymore
- Children: 2

Military service
- Branch/service: United States Army
- Battles/wars: World War I

Jack Breckinridge Tenney (April 1, 1898 – November 4, 1970) was an American politician who was noted for leading anti-communist investigations in California in the 1940s and early 1950s as head of the California Senate Factfinding Subcommittee on Un-American Activities ("Tenney Committee"); earlier, he was a song-composer, best known for "Mexicali Rose".

== Early life ==
Jack Breckinridge Tenney was born on April 1, 1898, in St. Louis, Missouri and moved to California in 1908. During World War I, he fought with the American Expeditionary Force in France. Upon his return, he married Leda Westrem, a 16 year-old stenographer, and they had a baby while living at 3764 South Main street, Los Angeles. Marital problems ensued when Tenney became a professional musician in 1919, formed the Majestic Orchestra and spent 1920 to 1923 playing dance halls and hotels in Calexico and Mexicali. Leda filed for separation on the grounds of desertion and non-support in July 1920, and was awarded custody and support. She was killed in an automobile accident in January 1921.

== Career ==
While he was a bandleader and professional musician 1919-1933 in Calexico, California and Mexicali, Mexico, he composed the popular "standard" "Mexicali Rose". In 1922, he wrote the lyrics, putting them under the name "Helen Stone", a singer who put up the money for the first publication, by W.A. Quincke & Co., Los Angeles, on March 10, 1923.

However, Tenney turned his energies towards night law school, and moved back to Los Angeles in 1928. The 1929 sound film Mexicali Rose, starring Barbara Stanwyck, came and went. He reportedly sold his interest in "Mexicali Rose" for two to three thousand dollars to M.M. Cole Company of Chicago. In December 1932 Tenney was elected to the lucrative post of president of Local 47 of the American Federation of Musicians. In 1935, he passed the California State Bar examination and became successful in practice.

=== California State Assembly ===
Tenney ran for the California State Assembly in 1936 as a Democrat and won. During his tenure, he gained a reputation as a progressive and was even charged with being a member of the Communist Party. In 1940, he served as one of California's electors, casting his vote for Franklin D. Roosevelt. In 1942, Tenney ran for the State Senate as a Republican, serving three four-year terms there.

=== Tenney Committee ===
Tenney made his name in the State Senate as a foe of Communism, and was chair of the California State Senate Committee on Un-American Activities from 1941 to 1949. He stated, "You can no more coexist with communism than you can coexist with a nest of rattlesnakes." As the chairman of the California Senate Factfinding Subcommittee on Un-American Activities, which investigated alleged communists in California, Tenney "vigorously attacked everyone he believed to be a Communist or to have Communist sympathies".

Those investigated by Tenney's committee included:

- Paul Robeson: singer, actor and activist
- Carey McWilliams: writer (with other members of the Sleepy Lagoon Defense Committee)
- Catherine Bauer Wurster: housing expert who successfully defended herself and her husband William Wurster
- Luisa Moreno: Guatemalan-born labor organizer
- Edward G. Robinson: Hollywood actor whom Tenney denounced in 1949 as "frequently involved in Communist fronts and causes"
- Ben Rosenthal: Los Angeles Municipal Judge and Tenney's former friend and colleague in the State Legislature
- Frank Sinatra: singer and actor

=== Early blacklist ===
In 1941, producer Walt Disney took out an ad in Variety, the industry trade magazine, declaring his conviction that "Communist agitation" was behind a cartoonists and animators' strike. According to historians Larry Ceplair and Steven Englund, "In actuality, the strike had resulted from Disney's overbearing paternalism, high-handedness, and insensitivity." Inspired by Disney, California State Senator Tenney, chairman of the state legislature's California Senate Factfinding Subcommittee on Un-American Activities, launched an investigation of "Reds in movies". The probe fell flat, and was mocked in several Variety headlines.

=== Book banning ===
In 1941, John D. Henderson, President of the California Library Association (CLA), predicted that in the 1940s librarians would experience a "war on books and ideas." In response to this climate, CLA formed a "Committee on Intellectual Freedom to Safeguard the Rights of Library Users to Freedom of Inquiry." At the same time, Tenney was appointed the chair of a legislative Fact-Finding Committee on Un American Activities in California, which was charged with investigating "all facts ... rendering the people of the State ... less fit physically, mentally, morally, economically, or socially." The Tenney Committee began to investigate any textbooks associated with suspected subversives, such as Carey McWilliams or Langston Hughes. A multi-volume series of textbooks called the Building America Series, which had been used in classrooms for over a decade, came under the scrutiny of Tenney's Committee. Committee member Richard E. Combs argued that the series put "undue emphasis on slums, discrimination, unfair labor practices, ... and a great many other elements that comprise the seedy side of life." Miriam Matthews wrote an article detailing CLA's work fighting censorship for the American Library Association's Library Journal in which she argued that, if successful, the Tenney Committee's legislative efforts would "prohibit instruction in controversial subjects."

=== Zoot Suit Riots ===
On June 21, 1943, the State Un-American Activities Committee, under state senator Tenney, arrived in Los Angeles with orders to "determine whether the present Zoot Suit Riots were sponsored by Nazi agencies attempting to spread disunity between the United States and Latin-American countries." Although Tenney claimed he had evidence the riots were "[A]xis-sponsored", no evidence was ever presented to support this claim. Japanese propaganda broadcasts accused the U.S. government of ignoring the brutality of U.S. Marines toward Mexicans. In late 1944, ignoring the findings of the McGucken committee and the unanimous reversal of the convictions by the appeals court in the Sleepy Lagoon case on October 4, the Tenney Committee announced that the National Lawyers Guild was an "effective communist front."

=== Loyalty oath ===
Tenney was instrumental in forcing the University of California to implement loyalty oaths on its faculty when he introduced legislation requiring such oaths. In 1949, as the head of the Un-American Activities, Tenney drafted legislation that would introduce a constitutional amendment to be placed on the state ballot that would give the state legislature authority over the university in matters of loyalty. Tenney's Senate Bill 130 would have forbidden the teaching of un-American subjects in the public schools of California, which would be required to teach "Americanism."

The University's representative at the legislature, Controller James H. Corley, who served as the University's chief lobbyist, was alarmed as he felt that Tenney represented a political movement that was bound to succeed. After Corley consulted with Tenney, the loyalty oath program was implemented without recourse to the ballot, apparently without consulting with University chancellor Robert Gordon Sproul. Ironically, Corley overestimated Tenney's power. He was ousted as the chair of the Un-American Activities Committee that year.

In 1950, Sproul supported passage of a similar Levering Act.

=== Campaigns ===
Tenney ran unsuccessfully for the Republican nomination for the U.S. Senate in 1944, and in 1949, the year he was removed from the chairmanship of his committee, he ran in the Los Angeles mayoral election, placing fifth. The conduct of the hearings, by a later account, "egregiously violated due process", and of the hundreds of people subpoenaed and interrogated in its eight years, not a single one had been indicted, much less convicted, of any sort of subversion.

=== America First Party and antisemitism ===
In 1952, Tenney sought to move to the United States House of Representatives, accepting the help of anti-Semite Gerald L. K. Smith of the America First Party. Tenney lost to Joseph F. Holt, who won the general election.

Tenney produced a number of antisemitic books, which "stressed invidious interpretations of Talmudic passages", including Anti-Gentile Activity in America, Zion's Fifth Column (1952), Zionist Network (1953), and Zion's Trojan (with an introduction by John O. Beaty). Tenney ran for Vice President on the 1952 Christian National Party ticket headed by Douglas MacArthur. MacArthur had been "drafted" by the CNP (as well as the America First Party) without his consent, and the CNP ticket gained few votes. In 1954, the head of the state Republican committee pointed to this race as a reason to oppose Tenney for renomination.

In an April 1954 debate with Mildred Younger, who was challenging him for the Republican nomination for the 38th Senate District (which comprised Los Angeles County), Tenney denied under direct questioning from Younger that he had any knowledge of Smith, despite his having run as Vice President for Smith's party and appeared on the cover of Smith's The Cross and the Flag the month before the debate. Younger beat Tenney, but lost the general election to the Democratic candidate. The New York Times saw his defeat as part of the ending for McCarthyism.

Tenney moved to Banning, California, in 1959, and worked as a part-time city attorney in nearby Cabazon, California. He ran unsuccessfully for Congress in 1962.

== Personal life ==
In 1921 Tenney married Florence. They had one daughter, Leila. In 1945, Tenney and Florence Tenney were divorced. One of Tenney's daughters is Leila Florence Donegan, a former mayor of Monterey Park, California. Tenney had an older daughter from a previous relationship, Virginia Woodward.

Tenney died in 1970, aged 72.

== Awards ==
- 1953: Honorary degree Doctor of Humane Letters from unaccredited degree mill Sequoia University

Tenney also gave the commencement address there that year.

== Works ==
- Zion's Trojan Horse (1953)

== See also ==
- Members of the California State Legislature
