= Michigan Legislature Committee on Un-American Activities =

1947 investigative committee of the Michigan Legislature

The Michigan Legislature Committee on Un-American Activities, also known as the Callahan Committee was a United States state-level investigative body formed in 1947 and associated with the 1947 Callahan Act.

== History ==
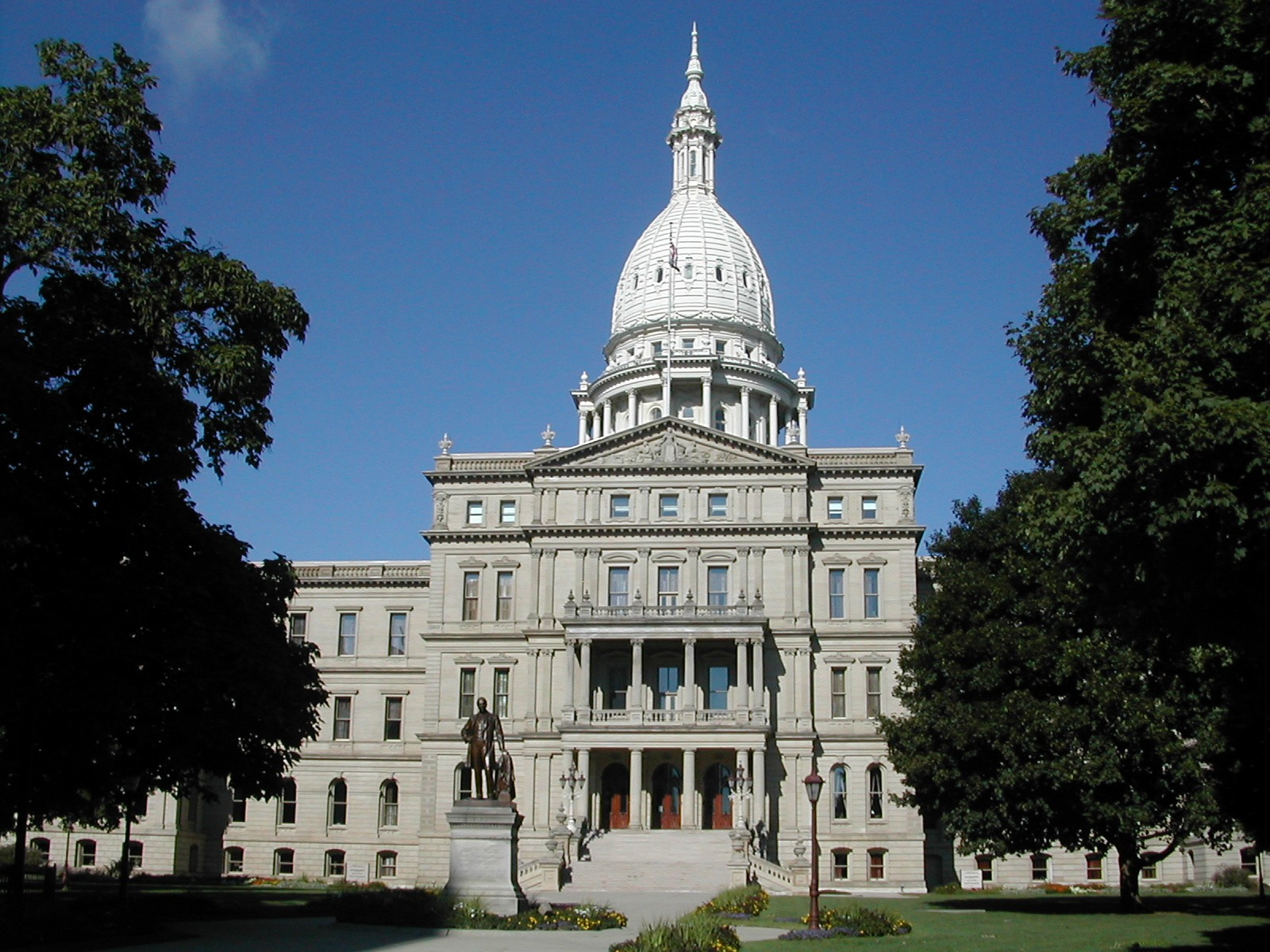
Michigan's state capitol building, home of the Michigan Legislature circa 2006

In 1947, the Michigan legislature created its own Un-American Activities Committee in parallel to the House Committee on Un-American Activities or "HUAC". Its head was Matthew F. Callahan.

According to the New York Teachers Union:

In Michigan the attack on the American Youth for Democracy was accompanied by investigations, by threats, by the calling out of the state police, by a spectacular flight of Governor Sigler to confer with the Federal Bureau of Investigation (FBI). It culminated in the Callahan Act, directed not only at students and teachers, but at the radio, publishing firms, political organizations, and trade unions.

On June 6, 1947, the Callahan Act passed the Michigan Legislature.

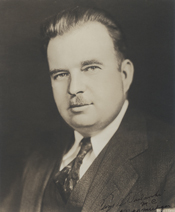
US Representative George G. Sadowski opposed the Callahan Act before the US House of Representatives

In May 1948, US Representative George G. Sadowski told the US House of Representatives:

We in Michigan know the full meaning of the Mundt bill, which would create a police state in America, and would make out of the Attorney General the chief gauleiter. This Mundt bill has a counterpart in Michigan known as the Callahan bill. It was passed last year by a Republican legislature. In a few days, over 115,000 aroused and indignant Michigan citizens signed a referendum petition to repeal the Callahan Act. A Michigan attorney general later declared it to be unconstitutional. The Callahan bill, like the Mundt bill, was intended to intimidate our citizens and to frighten them into abject servitude. But the people of Michigan were not to be bulldozed and rose in all their might and fury, and the Callahan bill is now a dead duck.

In 1953, the University of Chicago Law Review noted that a Michigan attorney general considered the Callahan Act "an unconstitutional invasion by the state of powers exclusively held by Congress"."

== Impact ==
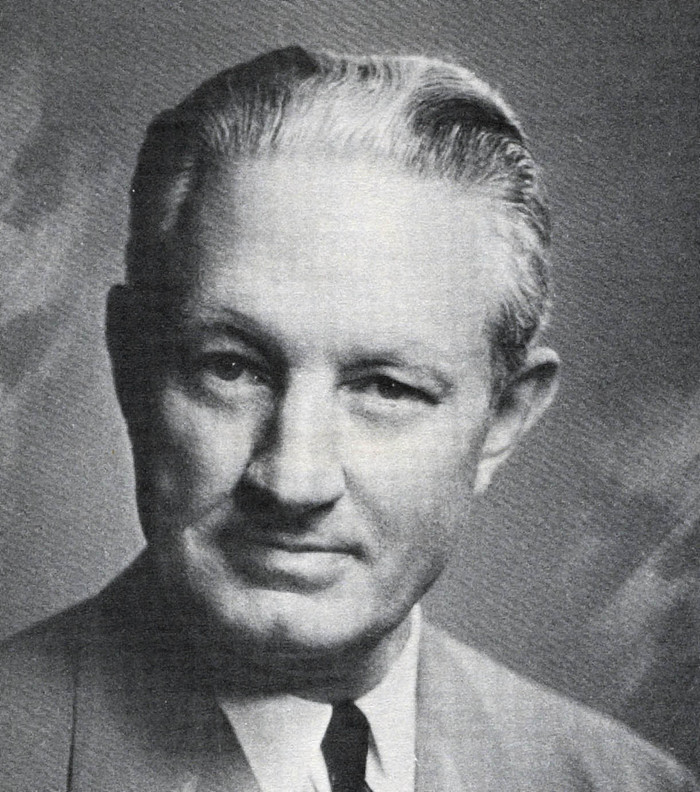
Michigan governor Kim Sigler circa 1948

The Teachers Union characterized it as follows:

The most sweeping attempt to legislate loyalty is contained in the Callahan Act passed by the Michigan legislature on June 6, 1947, after Governor Sigler and Assemblyman Callahan had terrorized the schools and universities of the state. It provides that any agency (including political and other organizattons – publishing enterprises, radio stations, labor unions) which "pursues the objects of a foreign power or powers and has been or may be declared subversive by the Congress of the United States of America or the Attorney-General of the United States of America, or the Attorney-General of Michigan" shall be required to register with the Attorney-General "information concerning membership status, activities, income and expenditures and other particulars as may be required by the Secretary of State." The Attorney-General is empowered to make, amend, or rescind any rules and regulations he may consider necessary to carry out this law. Penalty for violation Is $3,000 flne, 5 years in prison, or both.

In the Spring of 1949, James Zarichny, a student at Michigan State University, refused to answer the committee whether he was a Communist Party USA member, he found himself convicted of contempt of the legislature, and sentenced to one day in jail (suspended).

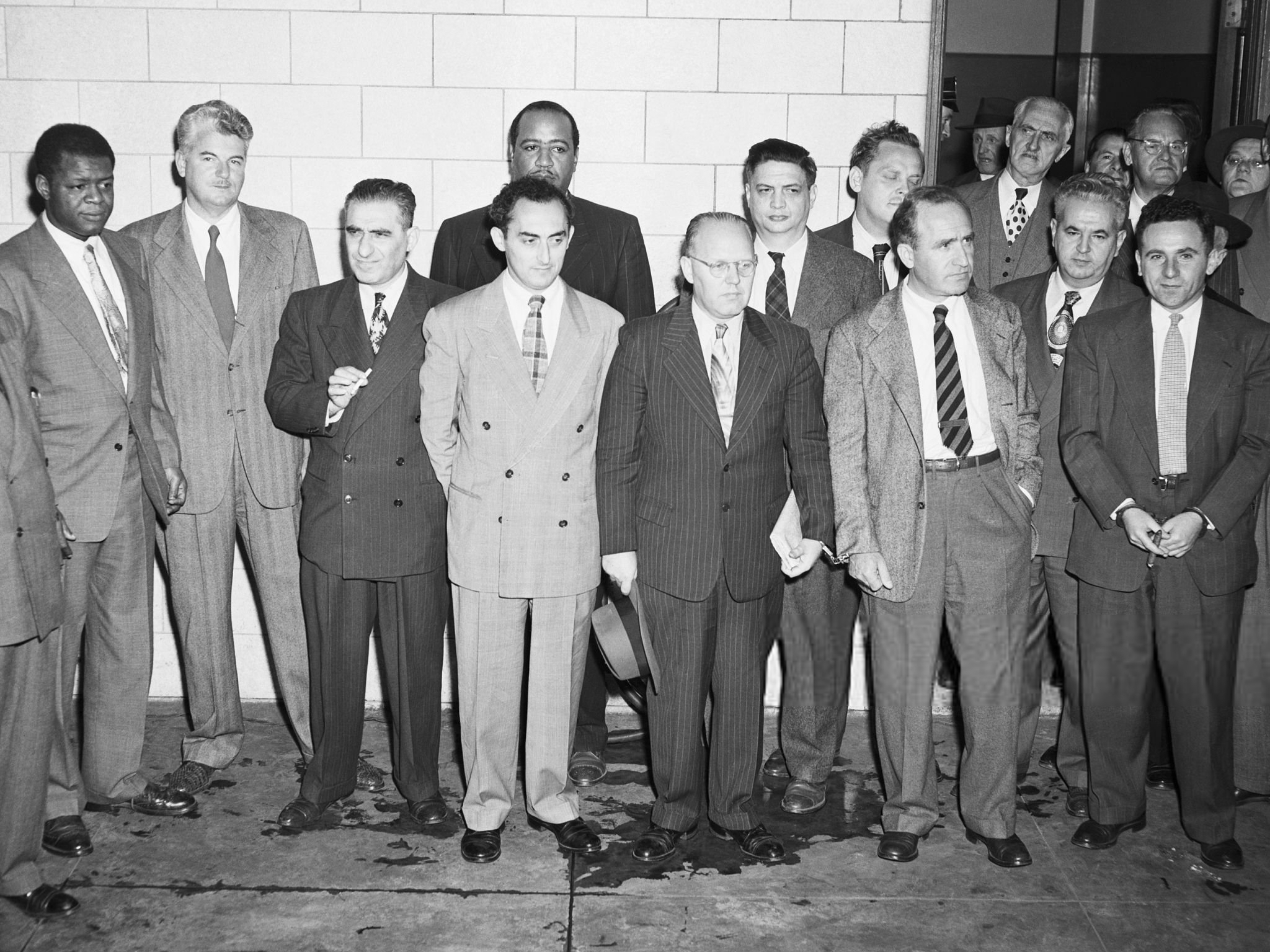
Carl Winter with 11 other top leaders of the CPUSA circa 1949

In reaction, the CPUSA organized a campaign to repeal the Callahan Act. Carl Winter, chair of the CPUSA's Michigan District, organized briefings for Party members on the Act, which he characterized as "the establishment of one-man rule in the person of the Attorney General with full powers to dictate the degree to which the citizens of Michigan may exercise their American rights and constitutionally guaranteed freedoms of speech, assembly, press and religion." The Party then kept close watch on the Michigan Civil Rights Congress, the Michigan Committee for the Repeal of the Callahan, the Civil Rights Congress, a Jewish American congress, and the American Slav Congress (ASC) among others. (On July 20, 1948, Winter was indicted along with eleven other members of the Communist Party's national board and charged under the Smith Act with advocating for "the overthrow and destruction of the Government".)

== Context ==
The Teachers Union noted in 1948:

Not the least dangerous aspect of the effect of the Un-American Committee is the pattern it has set for similar committees in various states. State legislatures in Illinois, Indiana, Michigan, Washington, California and elsewhere have set up similar committees. The most notorious of these committees is the Tenney Committee in California. It has sought to enad fifteen bills Interfering with the freedom of teachers and students, among them a proposal to ban from the curriculum all "politically controversial subjects." The Callahan Committee In Michigan has terrorized students and teachers. A good commentary on the thinking of some of our investigators is furnished In this Incident related by a Michigan student.

United States committees that investigated people for treason between World War II and the start of the Cold War have included:

State Committees;

- "Tenney Committee" or California Senate Factfinding Subcommittee on Un-American Activities (CUAC) (1941–1947)
- "Callahan Committee" or Michigan Legislature Committee on Un-American Activities (1947)
- "Canwell Committee" or Washington state Interim Committee on Un-American Activities or Joint Legislative Fact-Finding Committee on Un-American Activities (1947–1949)
- "Ober Committee" or "Ober Commission" or Maryland Commission on Subversive Activities (1948)

Federal Committees;

- "Dies Committee" or Special Committee on Un-American Activities (1938–1944)
- HUAC or Standing House Committee on Un-American Activities (1945–1975)

== See also ==
- Mundt-Nixon Bill

== External sources ==
- Michigan Constitutional Amendment; Subversion, 1950 at Wayne State University
- The Civil Rights Congress of Michigan collection 1933–1963 at Wayne State University
- Guide to the National Lawyers Guild Records TAM.191 at Tamiment Library of New York University
