= John Clinton Porter =

American politician (1871-1959)

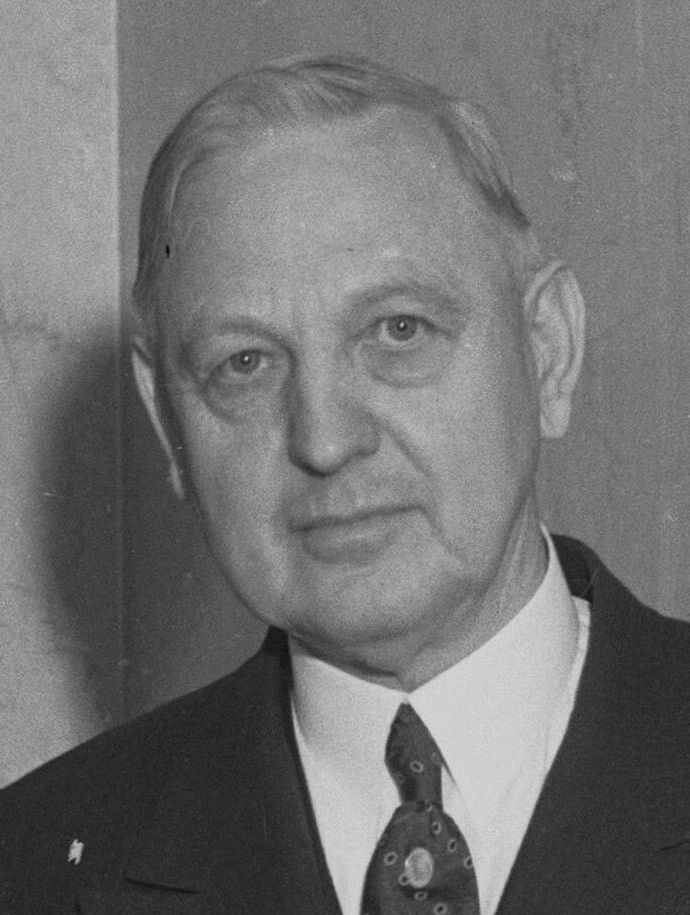
- Porter in 1933

33rd Mayor of Los Angeles
- In office July 1, 1929 – July 1, 1933
- Preceded by: George E. Cryer
- Succeeded by: Frank L. Shaw

Personal details
- Born: April 4, 1871 Leon, Iowa, U.S.
- Died: May 27, 1959 (aged 88) Los Angeles, California, U.S.
- Resting place: Forest Lawn Memorial Park, Hollywood Hills
- Party: Democratic

John Clinton Porter (April 4, 1871 – May 27, 1959) was a U.S. political figure. The Los Angeles Times wrote that he represented a "unique mixture of reform politics and xenophobic Protestant populism [that] took him quite literally from the junk yard to City Hall." Porter was a member of the Ku Klux Klan during its popular resurgence in the early 1920s.

== Biography ==
He was born on April 4, 1871, in Leon, Iowa to Reverend Josephus Clinton Porter and Mathilda Catherine Gardner. He grew up in Artesia, California.

He served as the 33rd mayor of Los Angeles between 1929 and 1933 when he replaced George Edward Cryer. He survived a recall election in 1932.

He ran for re-election twice more but was defeated in 1933 by Frank L. Shaw and in 1941 by Fletcher Bowron.

He died of a heart and lung condition in Los Angeles, California on May 27, 1959. He was buried at Forest Lawn Memorial Park in Hollywood Hills.
