= I Am the Law (1938 film) =

1938 film by Alexander Hall

- 1938 Theatrical Poster
- Directed by: Alexander Hall
- Written by: Jo Swerling
- Starring: Edward G. Robinson
- Cinematography: Henry Freulich
- Edited by: Viola Lawrence
- Music by: George Parrish
- Distributed by: Columbia Pictures
- Release date: August 25, 1938
- Running time: 83 minutes
- Country: United States
- Language: English

I Am the Law (1938) is a crime drama directed by Alexander Hall and starring Edward G. Robinson. The film, one in a wave of films of the time with anti-criminal themes, represents a departure from Robinson's screen image as a gangster. The picture was based on Fred Allhoff's 1936 series of articles for Liberty magazine called "Tracking New York's Crime Barons".

== Plot ==
New York law professor John Lindsay, due for a year-long sabbatical, is asked by Eugene Ferguson, a member of the governor's civic committee, to become a special prosecutor to fight protection rackets in the city, leading a legal staff that includes Ferguson's promising lawyer son Paul. Lindsay does not know that Ferguson is secretly involved with the racketeers. Ferguson, hoping to use Lindsay to remove some of his criminal competitors, arranges for Lindsay to meet alluring blonde Frankie Ballou, who takes Lindsay on the town for a night of dancing.

Lindsay's supportive wife Jerry visits the wife of milkman J. W. Butler, a victim of the rackets, pleading with her to convince Butler to testify against the racketeers. Butler volunteers to testify but is kidnapped and murdered. Realizing that there must be a mole among his staff who had informed the criminals about Butler's intention to testify, Lindsay reacts by firing nearly his entire staff. Lindsay is pressured to resign in the wake of Butler's murder but vows to continue the fight as a private citizen.

When Lindsay learns that Ferguson owns 90% of the insurance outfit behind the protection racket under a false name, he knows of Ferguson's secret involvement with the racketeers. To prove that the racketeers have no courage and to rally the public to his crusade, Lindsay fights and badly bruises several of the criminals in the presence of the district attorney and the press, which results in a front-page newspaper story featuring before-and-after photos of the battered men. He unleashes a furious campaign to arrest every known criminal, despite the district attorney's admonishment that doing so may be an illegal violation of due process that could land both men in prison.

Lindsay, who had placed Ferguson and his collaborators under surveillance, confronts Ferguson and Frankie with indisputable filmed evidence of Ferguson's guilt and Frankie's murder of racketeer Moss Kitchell. Lindsay orders Frankie to write a story about how she had left a career in journalism to join the mob by promising to spare her from a death sentence. He also forces Ferguson to sign a will decreeing his fortune to continue the investigation efforts and to create a trust fund for Butler's family. Knowing that Lindsay's car is rigged with a bomb, Ferguson asks to borrow the car and is killed when he turns the ignition. Lindsay comforts Paul with the knowledge that his father displayed courage by his act of suicide, as Ferguson knew that Paul's career aspirations would be hampered with a convicted felon for a father.

== Cast ==
- Edward G. Robinson as John Lindsay
- Barbara O'Neil as Jerry Lindsay
- John Beal as Paul Ferguson
- Wendy Barrie as Frankie Ballou
- Otto Kruger as Eugene Ferguson
- Arthur Loft as Tom Ross
- Marc Lawrence as Eddie Girard
- Douglas Wood as D.A. Bert Beery
- Robert Middlemass as Moss Kitchell
- Ivan Miller as Inspector Gleason
- Charles Halton as George Leander
- Louis Jean Heydt as J. W. Butler
- Fay Helm as Mrs. Butler
- Emory Parnell as Detective Brophy

== Reception ==
In a contemporary review for The New York Times, critic Bosley Crowther called I Am the Law "the liveliest melodrama in town" but felt that Robinson "seems slightly miscast" and that the absent-minded gentle professor's transformation into a ruthless crime fighter "strains the imagination a little". Crowther noted the film's violence, writing: "Into its yawning hopper, Columbia Pictures has poured all of its vast resources of experience in the knock-down-and-drag-out school of cinema production. Extroverts will be glad to hear that in 'I Am the Law' somebody is kayoed, arrested, rubbed out, or blown up, during every five or ten minutes of the action, and anybody who can sit through a series of such incidents without a sphygmometric reaction—even if it IS only a movie—is just abnormal. We recommend it as a practically sure cure for low blood pressure."
