= James Conant =

James Conant is the name of:

- James B. Conant (1893–1978), American chemist and educational administrator
  - James B. Conant High School, a public high school in Hoffman Estates, Illinois named after James B. Conant
- James F. Conant (born 1958), American philosopher
- James Wallace Conant (1862–1906), American amusement manager for Schenley Park Casino and Duquesne Gardens
