= Constitutional Liberties Information Center =

The Constitutional Liberties Information Center was an advocacy group created by the Communist Party in California in 1961. This communist front organization was established to help stir up support for the Communist Party leadership, whose appeal of 1960 Internal Security Act convictions were going to be considered by the Supreme Court.
