= Lightning in the Night =

1940 speculative fiction

Lighting in the Night
- Author: Fred Allhoff
- Genre: Speculative fiction
- Published: 1940, 1979
- Publisher: Prentice-Hall, Liberty Library Corp.
- ISBN: 9780135365571
- OCLC: 4493849
- Dewey Decimal: 813/.5/4
- LC Class: 78023538

Lightning in the Night is a speculative fiction story about Nazi Germany invading the United States. First published in 13 installments in 1940, the story was a commission written by Fred Allhoff and published serially in the general interest magazine Liberty. The series was collected and republished in book form in 1979.

== History ==
Lightning in the Night is described as a "sensational serial" about "Hitler's invasion of the United States". The title is a fragment of a statement made by Adolf Hitler to the German Girl's League: "Unlike Mussolini, I would spring like lightning in the night and hurl myself on the enemy."

The work was commissioned, and came about, while Liberty magazine was "sponsoring a national contest" to find what became the official Air Force song. Cultural historian H. Bruce Franklin commented on Lightning in the Night in his 1988 book War Stars: The Superweapon and the American Imagination, noting that Liberty boasted that Allhoff had consulted with experts like Robert Lee Bullard, Yates Stirling Jr., and George Sokolsky on the piece. Lightning in the Night appeared in 13 parts published between August 24, 1940, and November 16, 1940. Accompanying illustrations depicted skyscraper towers collapsing in Manhattan, Wehrmacht troops capturing Independence Hall, and Hitler paying a visit to Abraham Lincoln inside the Lincoln Memorial. The first installment was released the same night that Edward R. Murrow began narrating "London After Dark" live from the Blitz. As the series unfolded over the next several weeks, according to Terry Miller, "The impact was overwhelming...A fictional blitz of New York seemed more real in light of the bombing London. After [the U.S.] Navy's fate was published, its vulnerability to attack became clear. Allhoff's use of Hitler as a character was innovative and startling. Liberty sales reached an all-time high. Whether in praise or opposition, everyone had his own, strongly held opinion of the book. The series was significant enough that the Nazis broadcast a five-minute commentary in response, calling the premise and plot an "outlandish exaggeration".

The final product of Lightning in the Night almost entirely anticipated the then-forthcoming global air war of World War II, and attempt to beat the Nazis to the atomic bomb with the Manhattan Project, "Thus the millions of readers of Liberty in 1940 were confronted with a picture of the future that lies in wait for them if the United States does not build a separate air force capable of strategic bombardment and does not win a nuclear arms race with the Nazis. One wonders whether this effort to build popular support for financing the atomic weapons research that was already under way might have had some tacit semiofficial sponsorship." The conclusion also presaged several aspects of the Cold War. Lightning in the Night was republished in book form in 1979. Terry Miller wrote the introduction to the 1979 printing, recapitulating America's isolationist politics of the 1930s and commending Allhoff for his "lamentably accurate long-range prophecies".

== Plot ==
The main characters of Lightning in the Night are a young U.S. Navy intelligence officer, Lt. Douglas Norton, and his love interest, Peggy O'Liam. In Allhoff's scenario, set five years in the future in an alternate 1945, the "Greater United German Reich which has consumed all Europe and its colonies and has established puppet governments in Latin America. Japan and Russia have split up the rest of the world, and the United States is desperately trying to develop adequate defenses for the attack which seems certain to come." The first attack on the U.S. comes at Pearl Harbor, anticipating by a year the day that would live in infamy in U.S. history.

== Chapters ==
- Prologue (written by Edward Hope; "future newspaper clippings" set the stage for Allhoff's narrative set in 1945)
- 1. The Prisoner of Corvo
- 2. The Enemy Strikes
- 3. Hitler Speaks—and America Answers
- 4. The Girl Who Saved the Fleet
- 5. The Siege of Seattle
- 6. Madness Over Manhattan
- 7. The Bombing of New York
- 8. The Fall of Baltimore
- 9. A Hazardous Enterprise
- 10. The Battle of Chesapeake Bay
- 11. Der Führer Delivers an Ultimatum
- 12. Conclusion: The Treaty of Cincinnati

== Reception ==
One 1979 reviewer said the magazine series "helped psychologically swing America away from a decade of pacifism that had unintentionally aided Hitler's war machine" but found the "flat characters, relentless plot and contrived denouement" tiresome. Another found the romantic subplot "refreshingly typical 1940s vintage."

== See also ==
- Timeline of science fiction § 1940s
- Hypothetical Axis victory in World War II
- The Man in the High Castle – 1962 novel by Philip K. Dick
- SS-GB – 1978 alternative history by Len Deighton
- Bernarr McFadden

== Sources ==
- Allhoff, Fred; Miller, Terry (1979). Lightning in the Night. Introduction by Terry Miller. Englewood Cliffs, N.J: Prentice-Hall. ISBN 978-0-13-536557-1. LCCN 78023538.
- Franklin, H. Bruce (1988). "Don't worry it's only science fiction". War Stars: The Superweapon and the American Imagination. New York: Oxford University Press. ISBN 978-0-19-505295-4. LCCN 87034734. OCLC 276803031.
