= Miriam Esther Brailey =

American physician and epidemiologist

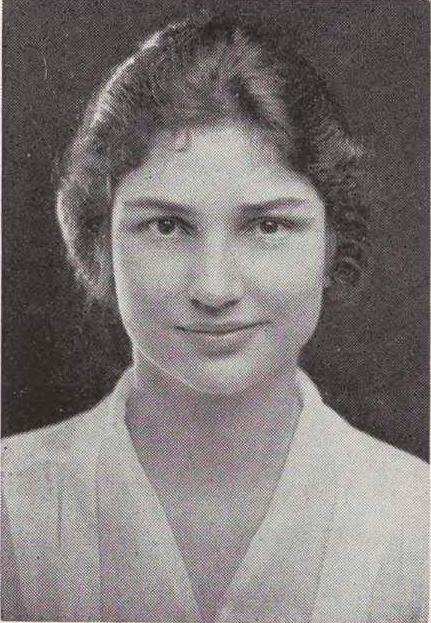
- Brailey in 1922
- Born: January 28, 1900; East Barnard, Vermont
- Died: April 8, 1976 (aged 76)
- Education: Mount Holyoke College Johns Hopkins School of Hygiene and Public Health Johns Hopkins School of Medicine
- Occupations: physician and epidemiologist

Miriam Esther Brailey (January 28, 1900 – April 8, 1976) was an American physician and epidemiologist.

== Biography ==
Brailey was born in East Barnard, Vermont. In 1922 she graduated from Mount Holyoke College with a major in zoology. She went on to study at the Johns Hopkins School of Hygiene and Public Health and Johns Hopkins School of Medicine. While there, she studied with Wade Hampton Frost, working on his tuberculosis studies. Much of their data came from the Harriet Lane Children's Home on the grounds of the Johns Hopkins Hospital, where she later served as director. Her thesis titled "A preliminary analysis of certain records of the tuberculosis clinic of the Harriet Lane Home: I. Tuberculosis infection in children of tuberculous families; II. The history to adolescence of children shown to be tuberculous during infancy " was unpublished.

During the 1930s, Brailey became an instructor in both the Department of Pediatrics in the School of Medicine and in the Department of Epidemiology in the School of Hygiene and Public Health (their first female faculty member).

Maryland passed the Subversive Activities Act (also known as the Ober Act) in 1949 which "called for state and city employees to sign an oath of loyalty stating that they were not and had never been involved in subversive activities." At that time, Brailey was working for the Health Department. Rather than sign the paperwork, she and two other Quakers refused. She stated that her "conscience would be very uneasy if I purchased the continuation of my job at the price of cooperating with legislation which I think is dangerous and undemocratic and will accomplish nothing." In March 1950, she was terminated from her position.

She was named assistant professor in epidemiology in February 1951, shortly before being appointed assistant professor in pediatrics and medicine and director of the tuberculosis section of the Chest Clinic at the Johns Hopkins Hospital.

Brailey died of pneumonia near Kingston, New York.

== Publications ==
- Tuberculosis in White and Negro Children, Volume 2 Commonwealth Fund, 1958
