= Lloyd Aldrich =

American politician (1886–1967)

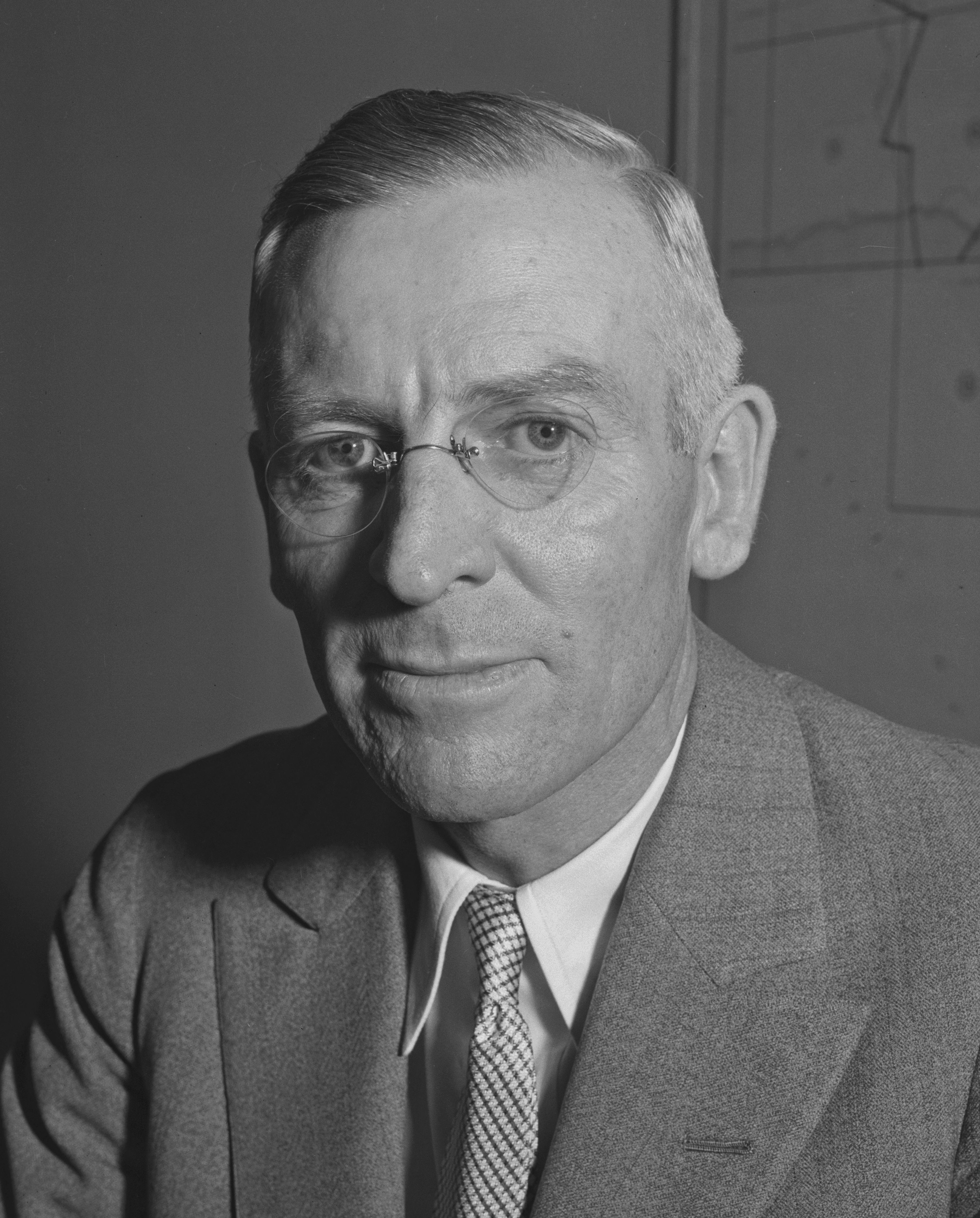
Aldrich in 1933.

Lloyd Aldrich was an American civil engineer from Los Angeles who ran against Fletcher Bowron in 1949 for Los Angeles mayor.

== Personal information ==
Lloyd Aldrich was born in Marion, Kansas on July 1, 1886. When Aldrich was three months old, his parents moved to Los Angeles, California and when he was 12 he was orphaned and ended up living with his older brother in Colorado.

== Education ==
Aldrich graduated from the University of Illinois at Urbana–Champaign.

== Early career ==
As a college graduate, he traveled west to work on engineering projects in Colorado and California. Aldrich was fortunate enough to be one of President Teddy Roosevelt's hunting partners.

In the late 1930s, the Government in the city of Los Angeles undertook a regional transportation planning effort, forming the basis for the first and largest freeway system build in the United States. Lloyd Aldrich was the chief engineer for this project, and had a plan to create a wide expressway and transit system to link downtown Los Angeles with the suburbs. His plan was thoughtful, and it was indicative of using the ideas of the people in an effort to involve them in the very infrastructure they were using. However, his plan was quickly halted because there wasn't enough funding. As a result, the government overtook the project.

== Retirement ==
Once Aldrich was retired, in 1955, he took part in private consulting work.

== Death ==
Lloyd Aldrich died at age 81 on July 21, 1967.
