= Frank L. Shaw =

American politician (1877–1958)

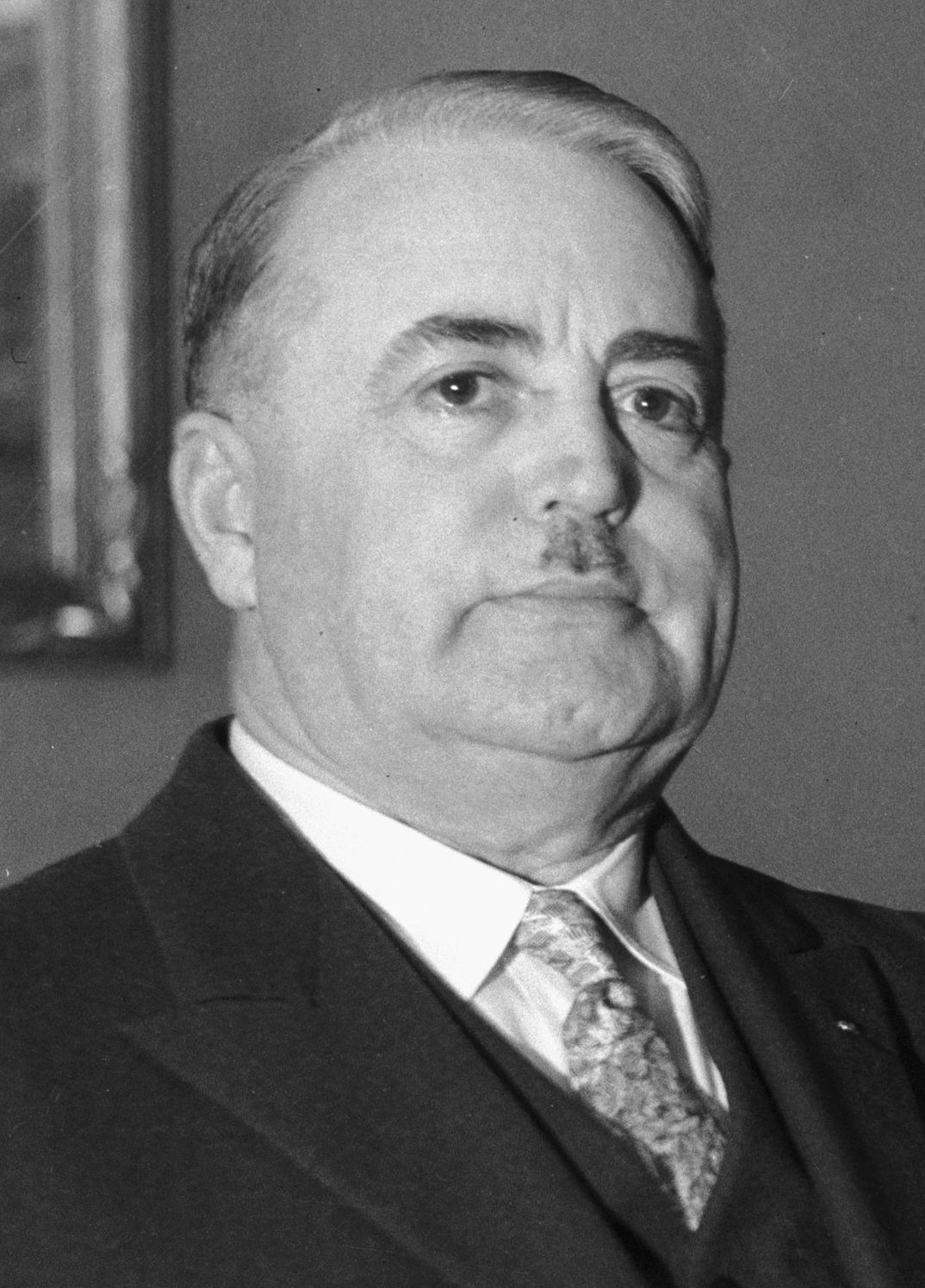
- Shaw in 1935

Chair of Los Angeles County
- In office December 6, 1932 – June 26, 1933
- Preceded by: Henry W. Wright
- Succeeded by: Herbert C. Legg

34th Mayor of Los Angeles
- In office July 1, 1933 – September 16, 1938
- Preceded by: John C. Porter
- Succeeded by: Fletcher Bowron

Member of the Los Angeles County Board of Supervisors from the 2nd District
- In office November 28, 1928 – June 26, 1933
- Preceded by: J. H. Bean
- Succeeded by: Gordon L. McDonough

Member of the Los Angeles City Council from the 8th district
- In office July 1, 1925 – November 28, 1928
- Preceded by: Office established
- Succeeded by: Evan Lewis

Personal details
- Born: Frank Lawrence Shaw; February 1, 1877 Warwick, Ontario, Canada
- Died: January 24, 1958 (aged 80)
- Resting place: Inglewood Park Cemetery
- Party: Republican
- Spouse(s): Cora H. Shires; Dortha Sheehan
- Relatives: Joe Shaw (brother)

Frank Lawrence Shaw (February 1, 1877 – January 24, 1958) was an American politician who served as mayor of Los Angeles, California, from 1933 until 1938. He was recalled from office in 1938, becoming the first mayor of a major American city to be recalled. He was also a member of the Los Angeles City Council and then the Los Angeles County Board of Supervisors. His administration was seen as one of the most corrupt in Los Angeles history, although he had some defenders and was never charged officially with any crime.

== Biography ==
Shaw, the son of John D. Shaw and Katherine Roche, was born on February 1, 1877, in or near Warwick, Ontario. He had a brother, Joseph. The family moved to Detroit, Michigan, then Colorado in the late 1880s and Kansas, before settling in Missouri. He went to public schools in Denver and in Joplin, Missouri. He studied business and then began clerking in a country store in Joplin and soon became a salesman with the Campbell-Redell Wholesale Grocery Company. He remained in the grocery business for thirty years, except when he was briefly with the Ozark Coal and Railroad Company at Fort Smith, Arkansas. As a representative of the Cudahy Packing Company, Shaw moved to Los Angeles in 1909. In 1919 he joined the Haas-Baruch Company in Los Angeles and left it when he was elected to the city council. Shaw's childhood affliction with polio left him with a noticeable limp for the rest of his life.

He was married to Cora H. Shires on February 5, 1905, in Fort Smith, Arkansas, and in 1909 the couple moved to Los Angeles. They had no children. She died in 1951 at the age of 68. At age 76, Frank Shaw was secretly married in Tijuana, Mexico, to Dortha Sheehan, age 22, and revealed the fact three years later, in January 1956.

Shaw was a member of the Los Angeles Chamber of Commerce, the United Commercial Travelers of America, the Los Angeles Athletic and Jonathan clubs, the Presbyterian Church, Masonic Temple 320, the Shriners and the Elks, Moose, Eagles and Maccabee lodges.

After Shaw's death, a will leaving all of his estate to Dortha Shaw was contested in court by a group of the former mayor's relatives, led by Shaw's niece, Frances S. Lawrence, and his brother, Joe Shaw. A jury sided with the Lawrence claim that Shaw had been unduly influenced by his new wife, but the verdict was not put into effect because all of the parties later agreed to a settlement.

== Public life ==
=== City Council ===
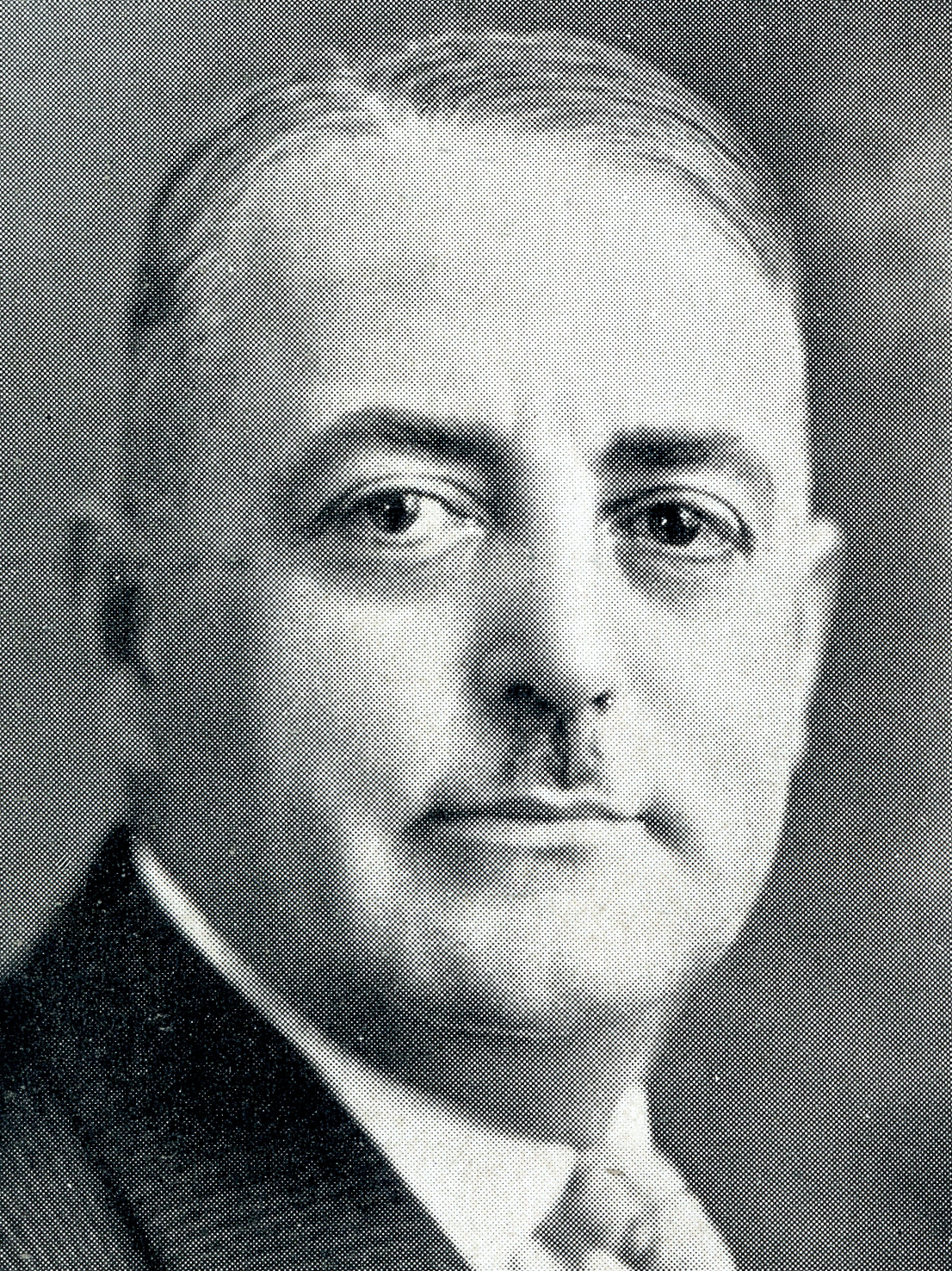
Shaw in 1927 as a member of the Los Angeles City Council.

Shaw was a large property owner who was active in the United Commercial Travelers' Association when he filed for the 1925 election in the 8th Council District. He was then living at 110 West 59th Place in the Florence District. He won reelection to two-year terms in 1925 and 1927.

Both Shaw and Council Member Robert Stewart Sparks raised criticism in advance of the May 1927 primary election when they each sent letters on city stationery to people who were on a tentative list for appointment as election workers asking them to call on the two councilmen to discuss in the words of Shaw's letter, "several matters which I believe will prove advantageous to you." Shaw denied that he was attempting to influence the prospective workers to influence his candidacy.

=== Board of Supervisors ===
Shaw ran for the Board of Supervisors in 1928 and easily ousted Supervisor Jack Bean, who had attempted to mock Shaw as "the grocery boy who made good." He was reelected in 1930 and 1932 and was named chairman of the board by his fellow supervisors in 1932 and 1933.

On the board he proposed the establishment of a county psychopathic clinic, which he said would be to "keep people out of asylums and prisons, not put them in." He was named chairman of a countywide committee on employment formed to help fight the "present crisis in the unemployment situation," and he proposed that employees in "all governmental departments as well as private business and industry" should be given a five-day week, "or a shorter work day," to meet the situation.

In March 1933, Shaw abandoned his previous temperance stand in the battle over Prohibition repeal when he joined a 3-2 majority in deciding to repeal a county ordinance that was even more drastic than the national Volstead Act, which controlled the production and sale of liquor throughout the United States.

=== Mayor ===
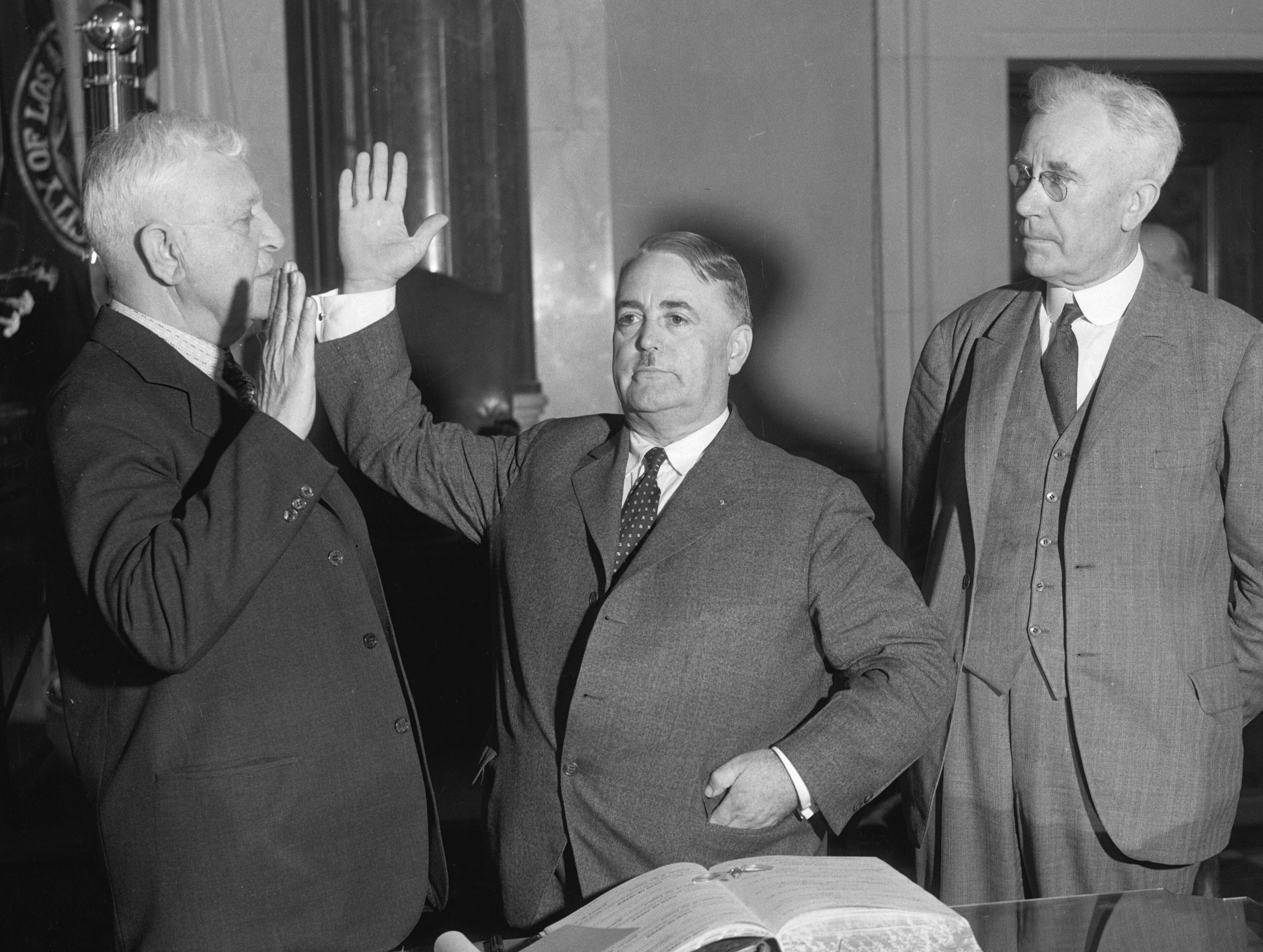
Shaw takes the oath of office as mayor in 1933, with councilor Charles Hiram Randall watching.

While still a supervisor, Shaw ran for the mayoralty of Los Angeles in 1933 against the incumbent, John C. Porter, and was elected in the final vote, 187,053 to 155,513.

During his term, the Los Angeles International Airport and the Slauson Avenue storm drain projects were developed by the Works Progress Administration, the Los Angeles Harbor became home base for the Pacific Fleet and the city employees' retirement system was begun. Union Station and the downtown Federal Building were constructed.

Meanwhile, the corruption in City Hall led to a recall movement against him and his close associates. "Police misconduct and the mayor’s mishandling of public funds forced Shaw from office and led to the election of reform mayor Fletcher Bowron in 1938." He was the first mayor of a major American city to be recalled from office. Previously Mayors Arthur C. Harper and Porter had faced recalls; Harper resigned before the date of the scheduled election, and Porter was sustained in office.

== Lawsuits ==
=== Citizenship ===
A major controversy erupted after Shaw's election as mayor when Charles A. Butler, former secretary of the Eagle Rock Chamber of Commerce, filed suit, alleging that Shaw was not a citizen and therefore could not be sworn into office. It developed that Shaw's Canadian-born father had taken out his first U.S. citizenship papers in Hays City, Kansas, in 1887, but no record could be found of a final disposition. The matter was finally settled on July 24, 1933, when Shaw took the oath of allegiance to the United States, and Butler withdrew his suit.

=== Warner Bros. ===
Shaw sued Warner Bros. in October 1939 for $1 million in damages, alleging he was defamed in The Man Who Dared, a motion picture supposedly based on the January 14, 1938 bombing of private investigator Harry Raymond while he was sitting in his automobile in the garage of his Los Angeles home. Shaw said the plot "contains a chain of circumstances which leaves the unmistakeable impression" that it was a "fictionalized version of the Raymond bombing." He said the film depicts him, Shaw, as having ordered his police aides to plant the bomb that severely injured a private investigator named Harry. The studio replied that the events were fictional and could have happened in any American city. The suit was settled out of court in February 1941, with both sides agreeing there would be no statement as to the terms.

=== Bombing ===
Raymond, the real victim of the bombing, sued Shaw and 14 other former civic leaders and police officials in June 1940. Raymond said Shaw owed him $500 from a $30,000 out-of-court settlement that had previously been reached over the incident. Shaw issued an "indignant denial" that he had ever "negotiated or paid any portion" of Raymond's suit against him.

=== Libel ===
Two 1942 lawsuits by Shaw charging Macfadden Publications and others with libel in the publication of articles in 1939 about his administration in Liberty magazine were settled out of court after the trial of one of them resulted in a hung jury. The first article, "The Lid Off Los Angeles," ran in installments beginning November 11, 1939, and included the statement:

Until the boodling Shaw machine was handed its hat and a decent and unfettered man was elected Mayor in September, 1938, the city of Los Angeles for 20 years had been, almost uninterruptedly, run by an underworld government invisible to the average citizen.

The second article was said to have been based on material furnished by the wife of anti-vice crusader Clifford Clinton under the title "My Husband's Death Struggle With the Vice Czars of Los Angeles."

At the same time the Shaw suits were settled, a claim by Clifford Clinton against Shaw was also laid to rest. Clinton had sued Shaw for libel in having claimed that he, Clinton, had taken "large sums of money from questionable sources for use in the 1938 recall campaign against Shaw." The exact terms of the settlements were not disclosed.

=== Oil lease ===
In 1951, Shaw lost a suit for damages he filed against Paul R. Ritter, a former business partner, concerning an oil lease in the Cuyama Valley in Kern County. Ritter had been Shaw's manager in the 1933 campaign for mayor and was later appointed by Shaw as president of the city's Board of Public Works.

== Death and burial ==
He died of cancer on January 24, 1958. His residence then with Dortha was 101 or 108 West 71st Street in the Florence district. His burial took place in Inglewood Park Cemetery.

Political offices
Preceded by Henry W. Wright	Chair of Los Angeles County; 1932-1933	Succeeded by Herbert C. Legg
Preceded by John C. Porter	Mayor of Los Angeles; 1933-1938	Succeeded by Fletcher Bowron
Preceded by J. H. Bean	Los Angeles County; Board of Supervisors; 2nd District; 1928–32	Succeeded by Gordon L. McDonough
Preceded by Office Established	Los Angeles City Council; 8th District; 1925–28	Succeeded by Evan Lewis
