= History of the Los Angeles Police Department =

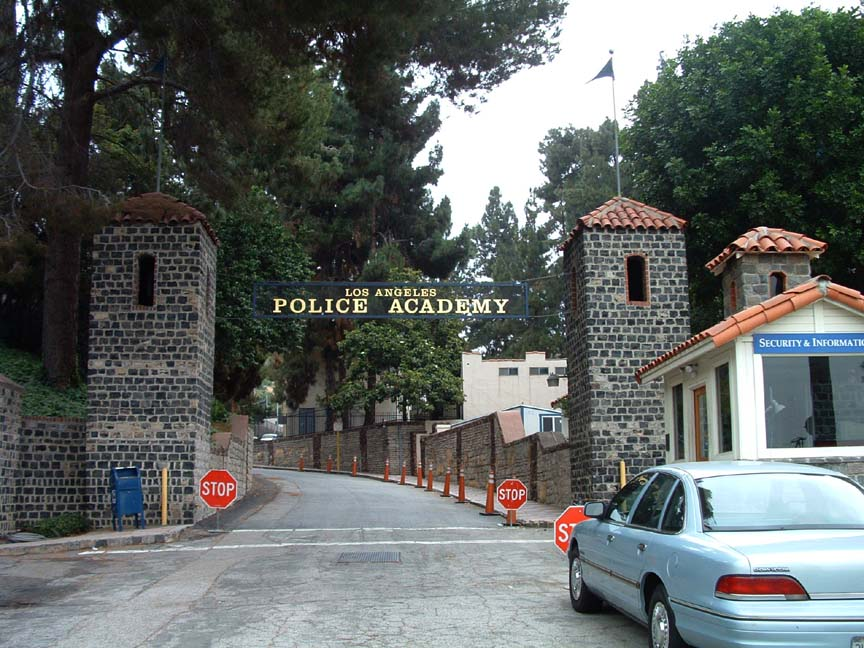
The entrance gates of the Los Angeles Police Academy in Elysian Park, established in 1925

The Los Angeles Police Department (LAPD) was formed in 1869, and has since become the third-largest law enforcement agency in the United States. They have been involved in various events in history, such as the Black Dahlia murder, the Watts riots, the 1992 Los Angeles riots, the North Hollywood shootout, the murder trial of O. J. Simpson, and the Rampart scandal.

== Early history ==
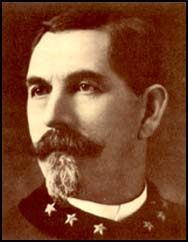
John M. Glass, founder and first chief of the LAPD

During the California Gold Rush, Los Angeles was known for its violence, gambling and "vice" and lack of effective civil law enforcement. It was reputed to have the highest murder rate in the United States at the time and the countryside was infested with bandits. Most men went armed with pistols and knives, and lynching was often the method used to dispose of lawbreakers, courts being few and ineffective.

The first specific Los Angeles police force was founded in 1853 as the Los Angeles Rangers, a volunteer California State Militia company that assisted the Los Angeles County Sheriff's Department in enforcing the law until its disbandment in 1857. The Rangers were supplemented from 1853 by the Los Angeles Guards, a local volunteer California State Militia company that lasted until 1880, and the Los Angeles City Guards, lasting from 1855 to 1861. The first paid police force was created in 1869, when six officers were hired to serve under City Marshal William C. Warren. Warren was shot by one of his deputies, Joe Dye, in 1870 in a quarrel over a reward. To replace Warren, the newly created Board of Police Commissioners selected Jacob F. Gerkens. The latter was replaced within a year by saloon owner Emil Harris, the second of fifteen police chiefs from 1876 to 1889.

The first chief to remain in office for any time was John M. Glass; appointed in 1889, he served for eleven years and was a driving force for increased professionalism in the force. By 1900, there were 70 officers, one for every 1,500 people; in 1903, with the start of the Civil Service, this force was increased to 200, although training was not introduced until 1916. The rapid turnover of chiefs was renewed in the 1900s as the office became increasingly politicized; from 1900 to 1923 there were sixteen different chiefs. The longest-lasting was Charles E. Sebastian, who served from 1911 to 1915 before going on to become mayor.

In 1910, the LAPD promoted the first sworn female police officer with full powers in the U.S., Alice Stebbins Wells. Georgia Ann Robinson became the first African-American female police officer in the U.S. in 1916.

== World Wars ==
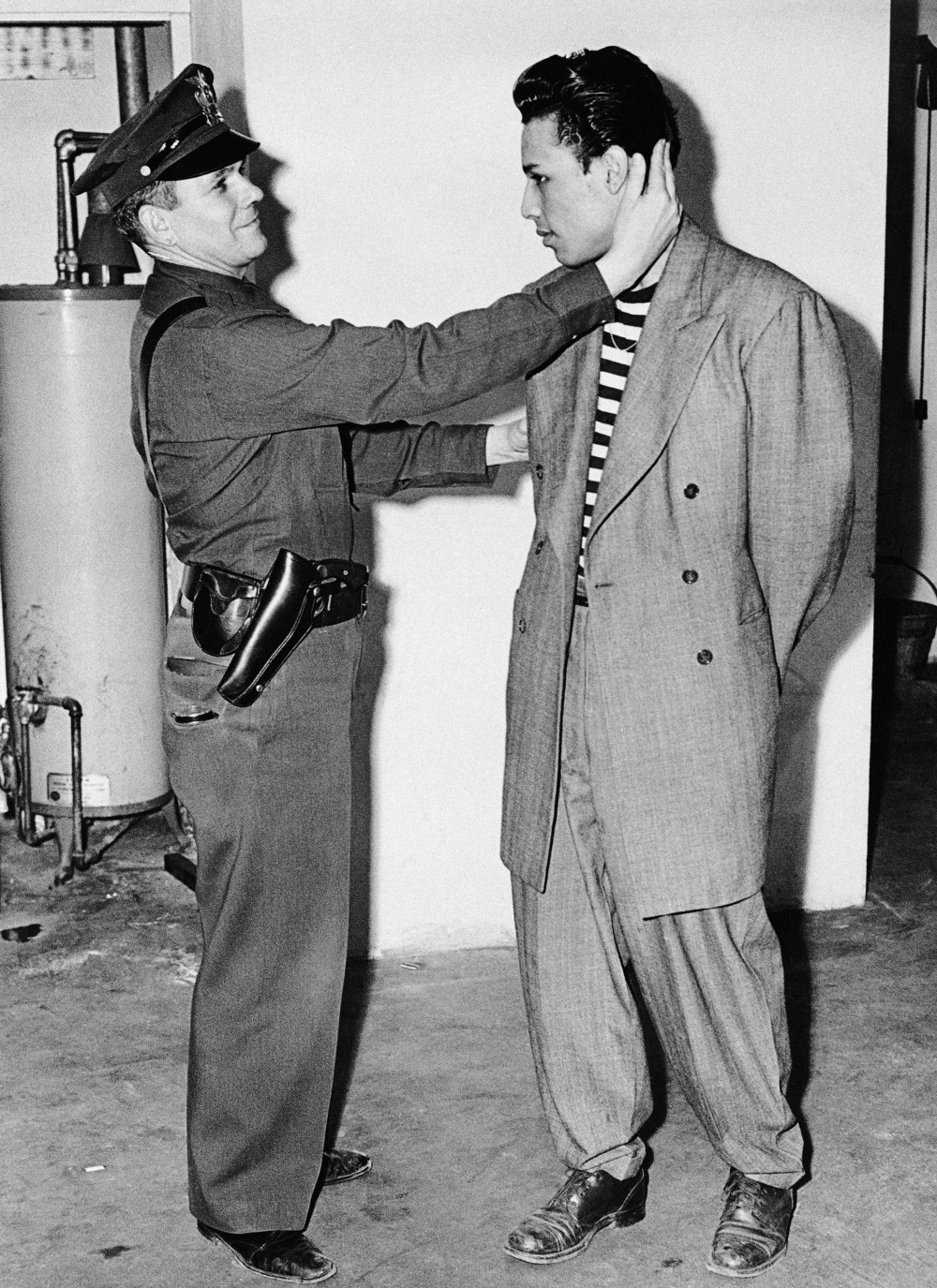
An LAPD officer inspecting a detained man wearing a zoot suit during the 1943 Zoot Suit Riots

During World War I the force became involved with federal offenses, and much of the force was organized into a special Home Guard. In 1918 the department closed the Los Angeles Municipal Inebriate Farm, an alcohol treatment program created as an alternative approach to incarceration for chronic drunks, and created the War Squad to track spies and labor agitators. In the postwar period, the department became highly corrupt along with much of the city government; this state lasted until the late 1930s. Two police chiefs did work within a mandate for anti-corruption and reform. August Vollmer laid the ground for future improvements but served for only a single year. James E. Davis served from April 1, 1926 to December 29, 1929 and from August 10, 1933 to November 18, 1938. In his first term he fired almost a fifth of the force for bad conduct, and instituted extended firearms training and also the dragnet system of policing. In his second term Davis instituted a "LAPD Red Squad" to attack Communists and their offices; key figures in Davis' "spy squad" included Red Hynes, Luke Lane, and Earl Kynette.

In 1924, the Los Angeles Police Academy was established to train officers of the LAPD and other agencies in the region; prior to the academy's opening, officers were not trained. The shooting events of the 1932 Summer Olympics were held at the academy. The actual academy structure was built in 1935, and its first class of officers graduated in 1936.

With the replacement of Mayor Frank L. Shaw in 1938, the city gained a reformist mayor in Fletcher Bowron. He forced dozens of city commissioners out, as well as more than 45 LAPD officers. Bowron also appointed the first African American and the first woman to the Police Commission. The modernizer Arthur C. Hohmann was made chief in 1939 and resigned in 1941 after a strike at the North American Aviation plant in Inglewood, in which he refused to use the LAPD as strikebreakers.

During World War II, under Police Chief Clemence B. Horrall, the force was heavily depleted by the demands of the armed forces; new recruits were given only six weeks training (twelve was normal). Despite the attempts to maintain numbers the police could do little to control the 1943 Zoot Suit Riots. War Emergency personnel were given a "WE" designation with their badge numbers to distinguish them from other officers.

Among the department's more notorious cases of the Horrall years was the January 15, 1947 murder of Elizabeth Short, known as the Black Dahlia.

Horrall and Assistant Chief Joe Reed resigned in 1949 under threat of a grand jury investigation related to the Brenda Allen scandal. Several of Horrall and Reed's more enduring actions, among others, were to approve a radio show about the LAPD titled Dragnet in the same year, with Jack Webb starring in the program, and the 1946 founding of the LAPD's secret "Gangster Squad" aimed to stop the rising threat of the American Mafia and organized crime (led by the local Los Angeles crime family) in the city.

== Parker era (1950–1966) ==
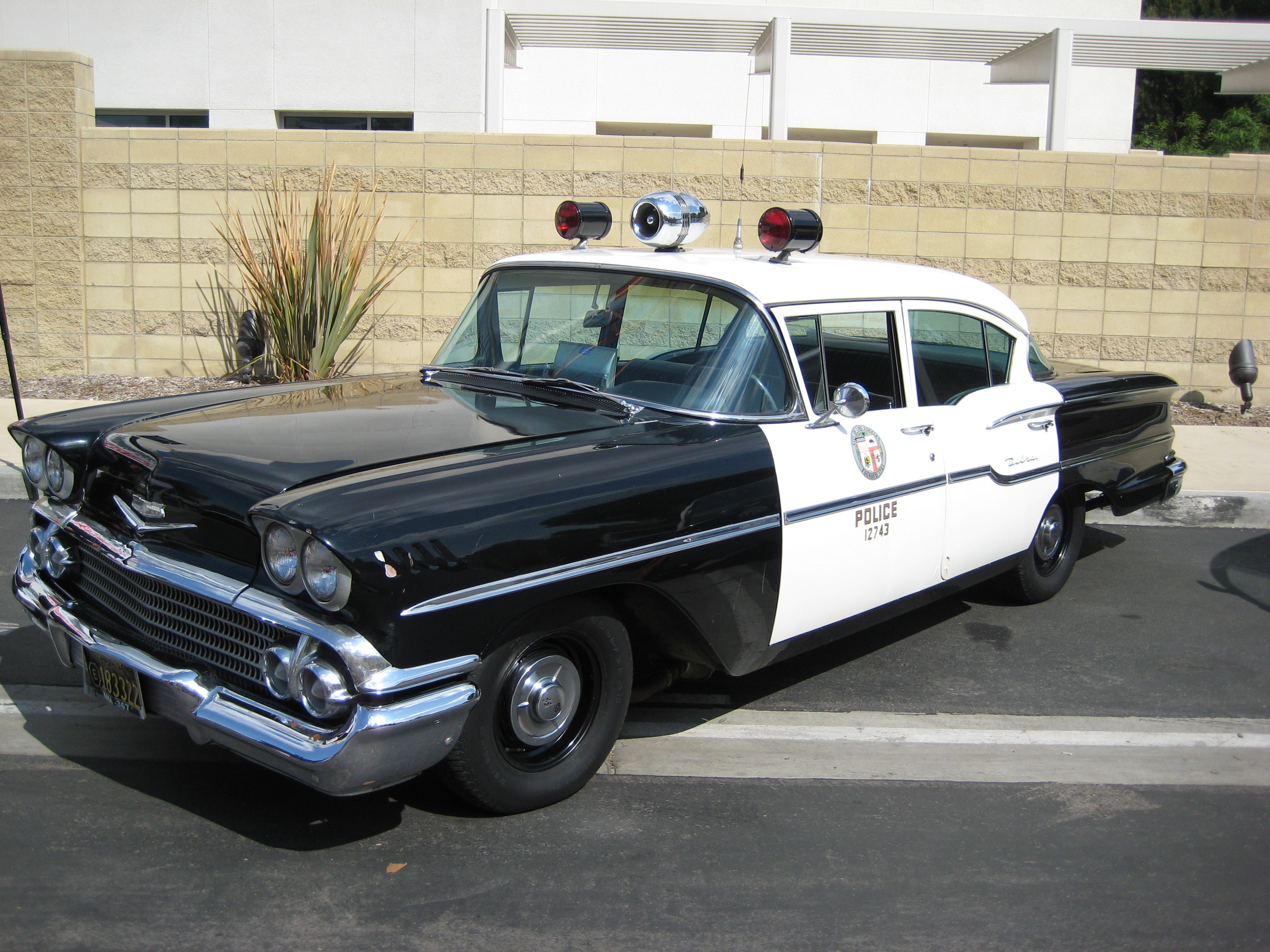
A 1958 Chevrolet Delray formerly used by the LAPD, featuring Trio T2 can lights, the standard emergency lighting on LAPD vehicles until the late 1970s

Horrall was replaced by a retired Marine general, William A. Worton, who acted as interim chief until 1950, when William H. Parker was chosen in tight competition with Thad Brown.

Parker advocated police professionalism and autonomy from civilian administration, especially as concerned internal affairs. The Bloody Christmas scandal in 1951 led to calls for civilian accountability and an end to police brutality in the city itself.

In 1952, Parker produced The Thin Blue Line, a local TV show that aired weekly on which he often appeared. In 1955, the LAPD held a contest for the motto of their police academy. The winning submission was "To Protect and to Serve", submitted by officer Joseph R. Dorobek. It was adopted as the LAPD motto in 1963.

Around this time the television show Adam-12 and televised edition of Dragnet increased popular support for the LAPD and led to police agencies around the country and the world emulating its structure and echoing its motto. In addition to his work with the shows, Jack Webb created the Police Academy Trust Fund and pledged a percentage of their profits to capital improvements for the academy.

The Los Angeles Times has written extensively regarding accounts of police brutality, abuse, and racism during Parker's tenure with the LAPD, including of the department, as well as city and state officials handling of the 1965 Watts riots.

Parker is the longest serving police chief in the department's history, serving in the position until his death in 1966 from a heart attack. The former LAPD headquarters was renamed Parker Center in 1966 in his honor.

Parker's tenure as LAPD police chief would also mark the beginning of a tense relationship between the LAPD and the Federal Bureau of Investigation (FBI). Despite having similar philosophical views as FBI director J. Edgar Hoover, Parker viewed the LAPD as an institution which should be independent of FBI assistance and interference and was hostile towards Hoover. The tense relationship between the LAPD and FBI which began under Parker was only reported as starting to mend in 1994.

== Reddin era (1967-1969) ==
Following his death, Parker was succeeded by Thad Brown as acting chief in 1966, followed by Thomas Reddin in 1967. Unlike Parker, Reddin was regarded as a reformer who greatly improved the image of the LAPD. Reddin was credited with modernizing the department and introducing community policing. As police chief, Reddin pledged to create an LAPD which "perceives the community as an agent and partner in promoting security rather than as a passive audience." However, in spite of the notable progress which was made under Reddin in reforming the LAPD, community outreach programs during Reddin time as LAPD chief were often viewed with suspicion by young men in "ghetto" neighborhoods. In addition, LAPD patrol officers were resentful of the concessions which came out of not only community councils, but also Reddin's negotiations with black militants; at the same time, Reddin was then adamant about not allowing more civilian participation over discipline.

== Davis era (1969–1978) ==
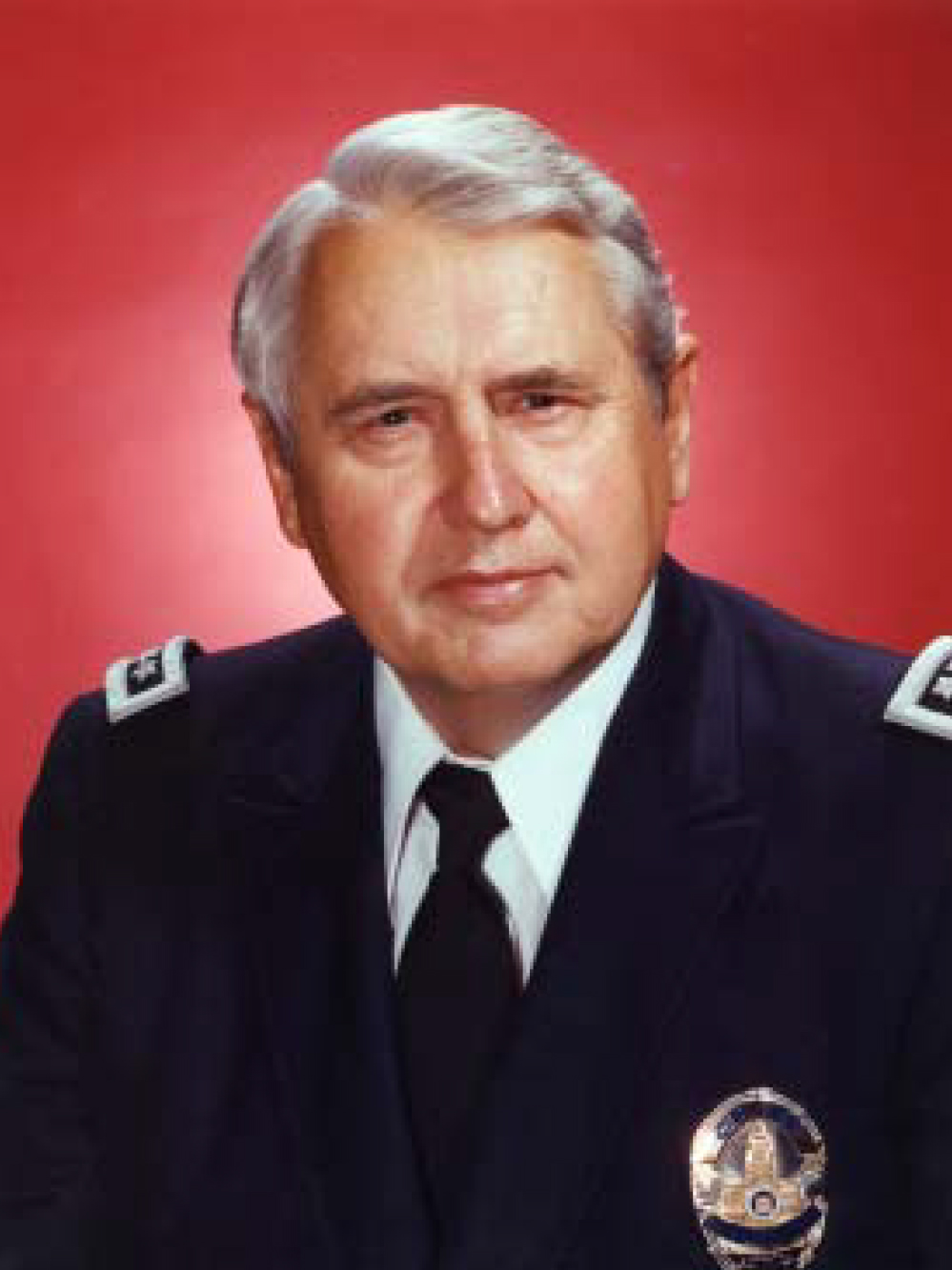
Edward M. Davis

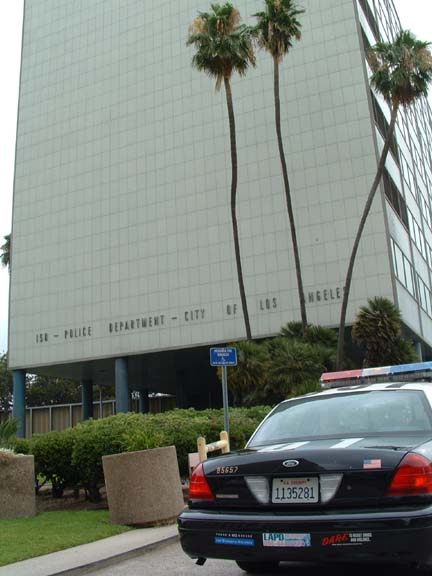
Parker Center, the LAPD's former headquarters, in 2004

In 1969, Tom Reddin would resign as LAPD chief to become a newscaster for KTLA. Following an interim term by Chief Roger E. Murdock, the outspoken Edward M. Davis became chief in 1969; Chief Davis introduced a number of modern programs aimed at community policing, special street gang control units, as well as the SWAT unit (1972); he retired in 1978.

The street gang control units were structured by Deputy Chief Louis Sporrer, who commanded Operations South Bureau, which was the Headquarters for the South Central Los Angeles police divisions. In 1972 street gangs were becoming a growing problem and initially were made-up of the best known gang structures of the Crips and the Bloods. A Gang Intelligence Unit was set up in 77th Street Division headed by a Sergeant Robert Michael. A uniformed team was set up and given the acronym of TRASH, or Total Resources Against Street Hoodlums, headed by Sergeant Beno Hernandez. It was from this time on that the flattering term gang was dropped and the term "hoodlums" was adopted.

Intelligence indicated that each gang had a "leader", a few close "associates" and follower "acquaintances" and when the leader was removed by arrest and detention that crime in the group's area of control went down significantly; when the leader returned however, crime returned to its previous level. To address this phenomenon, and to give courts a better understanding of whom they were dealing with, a joint task force of police, probation, parole, schools, and others formed an entity with an acronym of DDCP, or Disposition Data Coordination Project. This entity was housed in the South Bureau, and coordinated by the Intelligence Sergeant Michael. DDCP was a pre-sentence gathering of reputation information in the community, allowed under California law to be considered by the Court.

The DDCP was a repository of sources for the court to consider in its sentencing disposition. Soon however, it was dubbed the Alpha File by several attorneys and the ACLU filed suit against the City of Los Angeles. The DDCP project was later terminated at the discretion of the city. At about the same time complaints began being made by activists outside the City and South Bureau area, that TRASH was demeaning to the group members. Chief Sporrer renamed the units CRASH, or Community Resources Against Street Hoodlums, and it remained operational as it had been before the name change. These police specialists are still policing today in the same manner as they began in 1972, and still under the CRASH acronym.

Also during the term of Chief Davis, the LAPD pioneered tactics and procedures that would serve as the blueprints of modern community-policing. Known as the "basic car plan" or "team policing" the department sought to build strong ties to the community through the permanent assignment and deployment of teams of officers—patrol, detectives, and supervisors—to identified geographic areas. This allowed the officers to develop a working knowledge of their community and fostered familiarity, trust and respect on the part of the community toward its police officers.

Under Davis the LAPD and its vice squad were known for active policing against the LGBT community. Zealous officers, led by Detective Lloyd Martin, are purported to have dangled two youths over a cliff to try to make him reveal names of pedophile ring. On April 10, 1976 over a hundred officers, with Davis present, raided a charitable "slave auction" event and bragged to reporters that they had freed the slaves. Dozens of men were detained on charges of violating an 1899 anti-slavery statute, but the expensive raid was criticized by the city council and no one was convicted.

== Gates era 1978–1992 ==
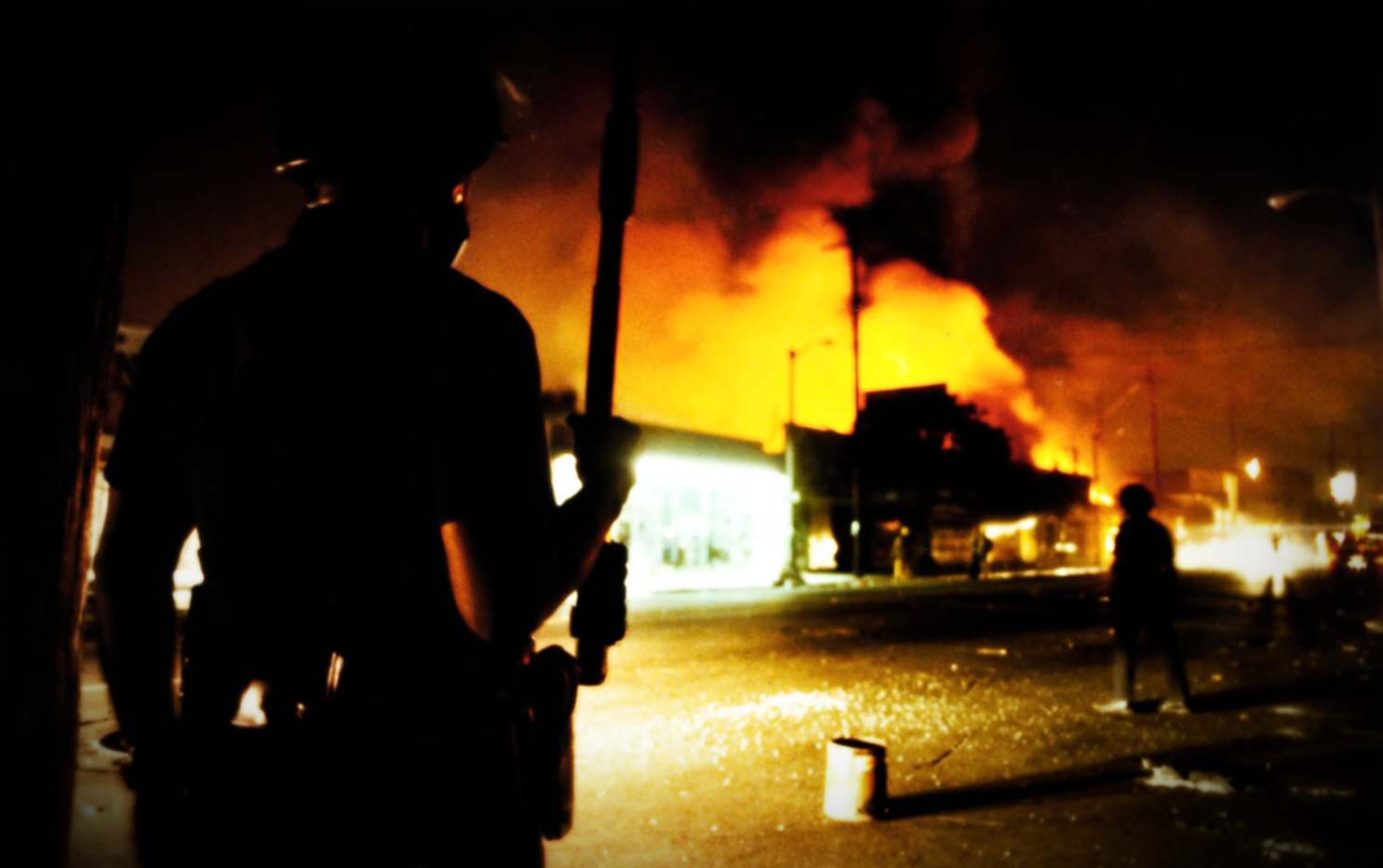
An LAPD officer in Central-Alameda during the 1992 Los Angeles riots

Davis' successor, Daryl F. Gates, came into office just as Proposition 13 reduced the department's budget, cutting police numbers to less than 7,000 in seven years, just as drug and gang crime reached unprecedented highs.

In 1979, Gates and the City Council created and implemented Special Order 40, that mandated that officers were prohibited from stopping people for the sole purpose of obtaining their immigration status.

During his tenure, widespread corruption at LAPD Hollywood Division was uncovered by Internal Affairs. In 1981 multiple officers were arrested on narcotic charges, running a brothel, and uncovered a burglary ring that involved over a dozen officers.

In 1983, under the direction of Gates, and the Los Angeles Unified School District, the Drug Abuse Resistance Education (D.A.R.E) program was founded to combat the misuse of illegal drugs and gang membership. To combat the rising tide of gang-related violence, Gates introduced Operation Hammer in 1987, which resulted in an unprecedented number of arrests, mostly of black American and Hispanic youths.

Gates retired in 1992 after the Rodney King-related 1992 Los Angeles riots in April and May and the damaging Christopher Commission Report.

== 1992 -2002 ==
Gates was replaced by Willie L. Williams, the fiftieth chief, the first African-American officer to hold the office and the first non-internal appointee for almost 40 years. In 1997, Williams was replaced by Bernard Parks, during whose term the LAPD was rocked by the Rampart Division/CRASH corruption scandal.

In 1997, one of the biggest challenges for the LAPD and LAPD SWAT was the North Hollywood shootout in which two bank robbers armed with automatic rifles and wearing body armor shot twelve responding officers and two civilians. The suspects were eventually defeated by SWAT units after a gun battle that lasted nearly an hour.

In November 1997, LAPD absorbed the MTA Transit Police, the first LAPD takeover in forty years. Originally touted as a merger process, this became a political football with members of the City Council fighting the mayor's "one city, one police department" plan to eliminate all of the smaller, specialized police forces (Transit Police, Airport Police, School Police, Park Rangers, etc.). In the end, only about 130 of the originally slated 200 officers of the MTA Transit Police came to the LAPD, with about the same number going to the LASD. After less than five years, the MTA removed the LAPD from its transit policing contract, and the LASD was given the entire MTA contract.

In 2002, after a loss of approximately 1,700 officers in two years (mostly to other Southern California police departments), and in the face of an unprecedented homicide rate, Mayor Hahn moved to have the Board of Police Commissioners refuse to accept Parks' application for another five-year term. Parks appealed to the City Council who refused to take up his cause. Parks initially threatened a lawsuit, but thought better of it and considered a run for City Council in the near future instead. Parks promptly left office, several months before his five-year term was up. Former Deputy Chief Martin Pomeroy was selected as an interim Chief until a permanent replacement could be found. Also in 2002, voters in the City passed the Proposition Q—Citywide Public Safety Bond to expand, renovate and replace existing police and fire facilities. This $600 million bond program included replacement of the West Valley, Rampart, Hollenbeck, and Harbor Police Stations; adding a new Emergency Operations Center; replacing the Parker Center Jail; adding a new Operations Valley Bureau/Valley Traffic Division; and adding two new Area Police Stations—20th (Olympic Area) and 21st (Topanga Area) Police Stations.

== Bratton era (2002–2009) ==
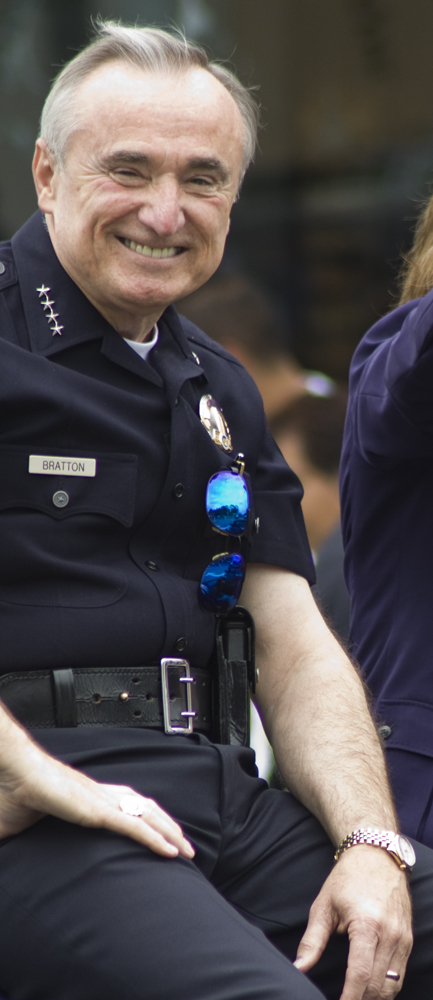
William Bratton as LAPD chief in 2009

Chief William J. Bratton came to the LAPD after having prior experience as Chief of Police for the NYPD, the NY City Transit Police, the Boston Police and the MBTA Transit Police. Bratton came in a manner very different from his most recent outsider predecessor, Chief Parks. Prior to his arrival, Bratton requested all captains and above submit resumes and biographies for consideration in his new administration. Bratton made his initial goals to fully implement the Federal Consent decree (left from the Parks administration), to implement a dramatic reduction in Part I crime and to create a world class counter-terrorism Bureau within LAPD (during Parks' tenure, a year after 9/11, officers still had no WMD training nor equipment; however, Parks had successfully implemented a "no US flag pin" policy for wear on officer's uniforms). Bratton later added community oriented policing to his list of goals. In 2005, the LAPD began showing action-packed mini-movies online and at movie theaters to promote recruiting. The movies feature real LAPD officers and what they do. Bratton retired as Chief of the LAPD on October 31, 2009 and became the chief executive officer of Altegrity Security Consulting, a private security firm based in Virginia.

On May 17, 2005, Los Angeles voters rejected a proposal (Proposition A) that would have merged the LAPD and the Los Angeles Airport Police. The argument against this proposal was that officers of the Los Angeles Airport Police had more extensive training in airport law enforcement and security operations; LAPD officers would have needed more training in this new function. At the request of Airport Police, LAPD officers are assigned on an overtime basis to security checkpoints in the terminals at LAX. This assignment became available to LAPD officers and supervisory personnel due to staff shortages at the Airport Police.

In 2006, the LAPD temporarily relocated two stations, Hollenbeck and Harbor, to Temporary Stations, while the existing stations were demolished and new ones built on the same sites. Also in 2006, a longtime goal of the LAPD, to replace Parker Center, began moving towards fruition with demolition of the old Caltrans building at 2nd/ Spring Streets to make way for a new Police Administration Building. The Department broke ground for two new Community Police Stations as well as a replacement of three older stations. The groundbreaking for the 20th (Olympic Area) Police Station, was on May 4, 2006. Groundbreaking for the 21st (Topanga Area) Police Station, was on May 11, 2006.

Replacement Rampart Station was built on the site of the former Central Receiving Hospital (police hospital) that had been located on 6th Street and Valencia Street. As a sidenote, exteriors from Rampart division on Rampart and Benton were filmed for the Adam-12 television series. The department does not permit the interiors of police stations filmed for motion picture purposes, so interiors were filmed at Universal Studios in Universal City, California.

The 21st (Topanga Area) Police Station opened on January 4, 2009 and was formed from parts of the existing West Valley Area and Devonshire Area in the Operations-Valley Bureau. The 20th Area Police Station area will be formed from portions of Wilshire, Hollywood and Rampart Police Station areas. Three additional police stations are planned for additions in the next ten years (2007–2016), one each for the South, West and Central Bureaus of the Department.

In 2006, Mayor Antonio Villaraigosa initiated gradual increases in trash collection fees paid by property owners to hire about 1,000 LAPD officers over the next five years.

On February 7, 2008, when LAPD responded to a call that an emotionally disturbed man killed three of his family members, the man shot two SWAT officers, one of whom was killed. Officer Randal Simmons was the first SWAT officer to be killed in the line of duty since the founding of SWAT.

== 2009–present ==
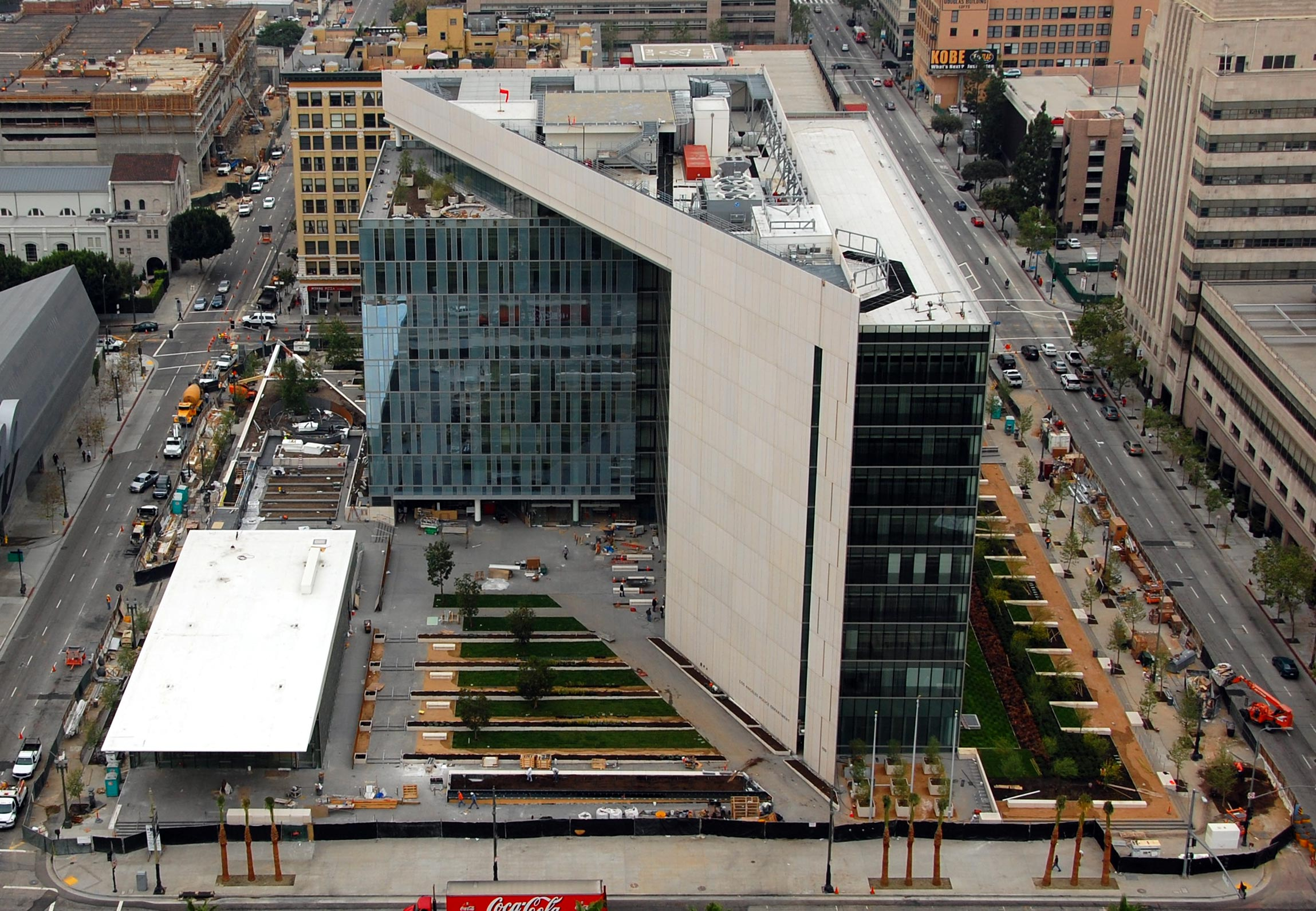
The construction of the Police Administration Building, presently the LAPD's headquarters, in April 2009

On November 17, 2009, Charles L. Beck was sworn in by Mayor Villaraigosa to succeed William J. Bratton as the Chief of the Los Angeles Police Department. A 32-year veteran of the department, he is known for commanding and rehabilitating the Rampart Division after the Rampart scandal. On November 8, 2024, Jim McDonnell assumed office as the 59th Chief of the LAPD. During his tenure, the June 2025 Los Angeles protests occurred, which involved the California National Guard being deployed as well as 700 Marines and resulted in millions of dollars in damages to city property.

== Central Receiving Hospital ==
The Los Angeles Police Department operated an emergency hospital for 102 years, near downtown central Los Angeles. It was called the Central Receiving Hospital, and was always in a police building that also housed other police functions, until 1957 when it was moved to a purpose-built police building. It existed from 1868 to 1970. The Central Receiving Hospital originated as a sanitarium sited in Chávez Ravine. It originally housed patients dying from incurable infectious diseases, in particular smallpox. In the 1880s it moved into the back of the Central Police Station, and acted as a police first aid station. Over the next 80 years it was housed in a series of three other police buildings: the new Central Police Station (1896), the Georgia Street Police Station (1927), and finally the Central Receiving Hospital building on Loma Drive (1957). It was started to provide hospice care, but switched to providing emergency care with its move into the Central Police Station in the 1880s. It was the first public hospital to provide emergency care in Los Angeles.

== See also ==
- Bibliography of California history
- Bibliography of Los Angeles
- Outline of the history of Los Angeles
- Chief of the Los Angeles Police Department § List of police chiefs
