= James E. Davis (Los Angeles police officer) =

Los Angeles police chief (1889–1949)

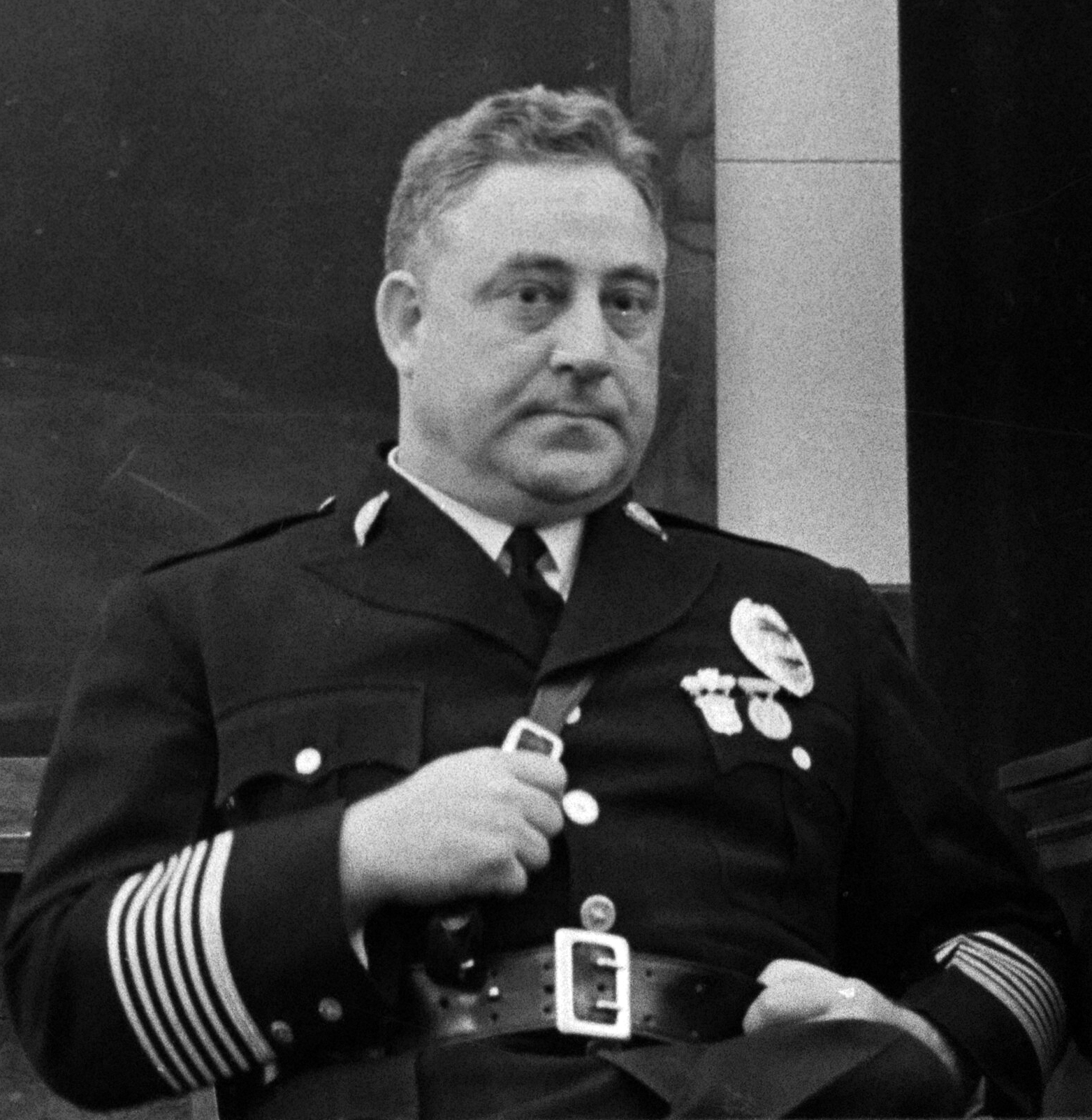
- Davis in 1938
- Born: February 8, 1889; Whitewright, Texas, US
- Died: June 20, 1949 (aged 60); Helena, Montana, US
- Other name: "Two-Gun Davis"
- Police career
- Department: Los Angeles Police Department
- Rank: Chief of Police (1926–29; 1933–38)

James Edgar Davis (February 8, 1889 – June 20, 1949) was an American police officer who served as the chief of the Los Angeles Police Department (LAPD) from 1926 to 1929, and from 1933 to 1938. During his first term as LAPD chief, Davis emphasized firearms training. Under Davis, the LAPD developed its lasting reputation as an organization that relied on brute force to enforce public order. It also became publicly entangled in corruption. Members of the LAPD were revealed to have undertaken a campaign of brutal harassment, including the bombings of political reformers who had incurred the wrath of the department and the civic administration.

Under Chief Davis, civil service reforms were implemented in the City Charter via the ballot initiative process, which insulated the police department from political influence.

== Career ==
=== First term ===
James E. Davis made a name for himself as the head of the vice squad during Prohibition. When Chief Davis created a "gun squad" staffed with 50 policemen, he publicly announced "the gun-toting element and the rum smugglers are going to learn that murder and gun-toting are most inimical to their best interest." Davis declared that the LAPD would "hold court on gunmen in the Los Angeles streets; I want them brought in dead, not alive and will reprimand any officer who shows the least mercy to a criminal." For his efforts, he won the moniker "Two-Gun Davis."

The primary "targets" of Davis' department were purveyors of vice, radicals, and vagrants.

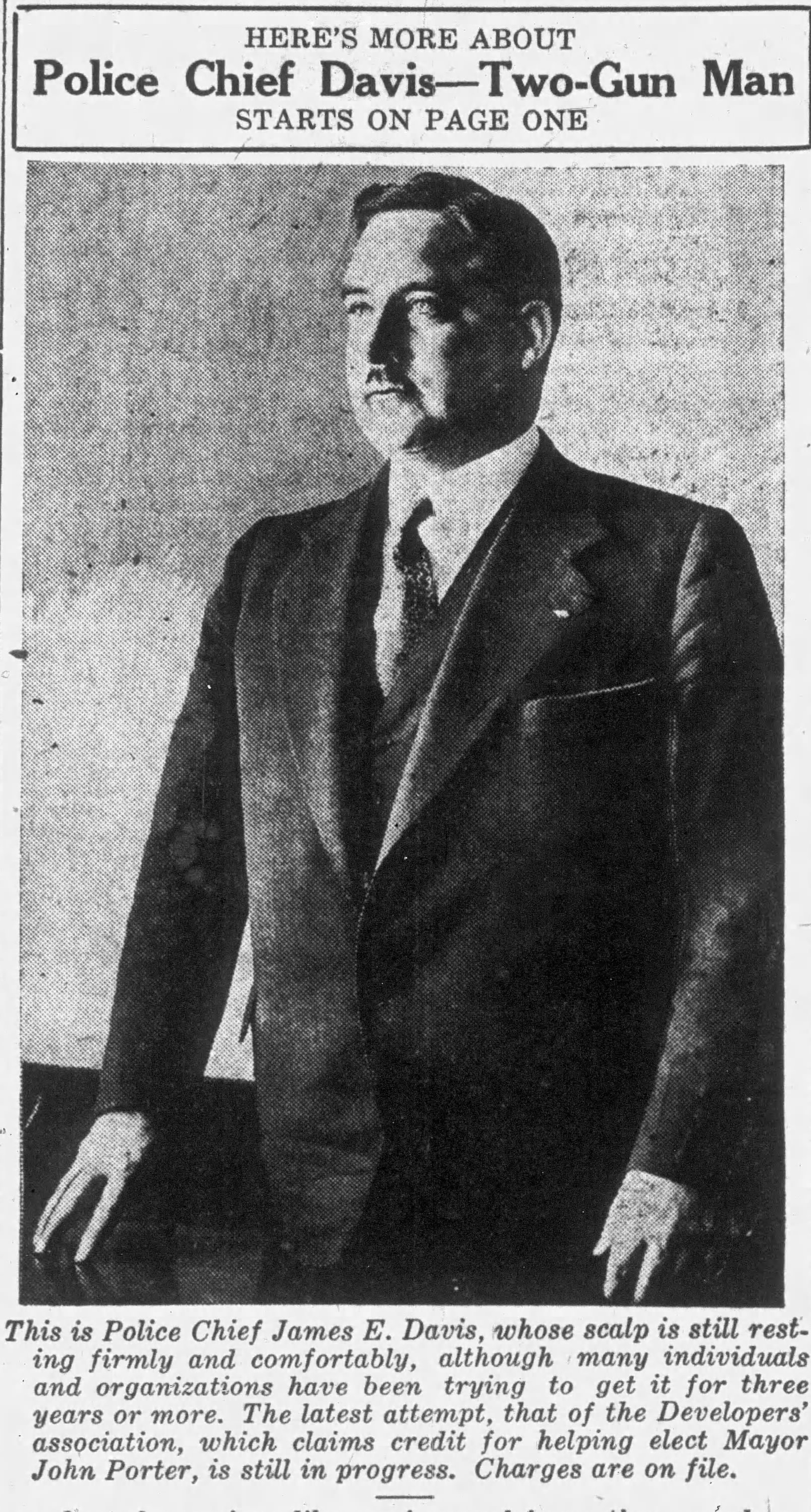
Edgar "Two-Gun Man" Davis during his first stint as chief of police

Davis was a proponent of the use of radio in police work. In 1929, he ordered his staff to investigate the use of radio for dispatching officers. It was his successor, Roy E. Steckel, who put radio in L.A.P.D. vehicles.

=== Second term ===
After being succeeded by and succeeding Police Chief Roy E. Steckel, Davis served as chief from 1933 to 1938. In his second-go-round as chief, Davis developed a reputation as a reformer. Under Chief Steckel, departmental regulations forbidding the solicitation of rewards or the acceptance of gratuities by policemen had lapsed; Davis reimplemented the restrictions. He also fired 245 police officers for misconduct in the first four years of his second term.

However, in reality, Two-Gun Davis was to serve one of the most corrupt mayors in Los Angeles history, Frank L. Shaw, who had been elected despite the opposition of the Chandler Family, conservatives who owned the powerful Los Angeles Times newspaper. (The 1910 L.A. Times building bombing had been carried out by a union member, upset with the anti-union stance of publisher Harrison Gray Otis, whose son-in-law Harry Chandler would take over as publisher of the Times in 1917. The bombing killed 21 newspaper employees and injured 100.)

To curry favor with the Chandlers, Shaw appointed Davis chief. Chandler was fiercely anti-labor, and Davis, as chief, could provide police muscle to discourage unionization.

Davis formed a "Red Squad" in order to "investigate and control radical activities, strikes, and riots." According to the Official LAPD website, one Police Commissioner (Mark A. Pierce) declared his support for Davis' Red Squad, saying, "The more the police beat them up and wreck their headquarters, the better. Communists have no Constitutional rights and I won't listen to anyone who defends them."

Mayor Shaw appointed his campaign manager, James "Sunny Jimmy" Bolger, to serve as Davis' secretary, in order to keep a tight rein on the Chief.

Under Chief Davis, the LAPD would become mired in corruption, becoming active agents in the promotion of vice.

=== Police academy ===
Starting in 1933, Davis began transforming the pistol range and related facilities of the Los Angeles Police Revolver and Athletic Club (LAPRAAC) in Elysian Park into a true training facility for recruits. Police recruits had begun training in an armory located in Elysian Park in 1924. The LAPRAAC had been founded as a private club in 1925 by LAPD officers to practice their marksmanship. In 1932, their range was used during the 1932 Summer Olympics for shooting events. In recognition, the Olympic Committee donated the dormitory used as the Olympic Village, and the dormitory building was dismantled and reassembled at the site of the range in Elysian Fields. The building would eventually house the restaurant for the new training facility that would become the LAPD's Police Academy. From 1935 to 1995, all recruits were trained at the Elysian Field site, when the new Recruit Training Center was opened in Westchester. The Elysian Park facilities, the legacy of Chief Davis, are to be used for in-service training.

The rules and regulations for the new Police Academy were drafted by L.A.P.D Lieutenant William H. Parker, who would go on to become Chief of Police in 1950.

Parker also drafted civil service reforms enacted into the City's charter that were designed to protect the chief and police personnel from political interference. Charter Amendment 14-A, which was passed by the electorate in April 1937, changed City Charter Section 1999 so that the Chief of Police could not be removed without a hearing before the L.A. Board of Civil Service Commissioners.

=== East Coast Crime Syndicate ===
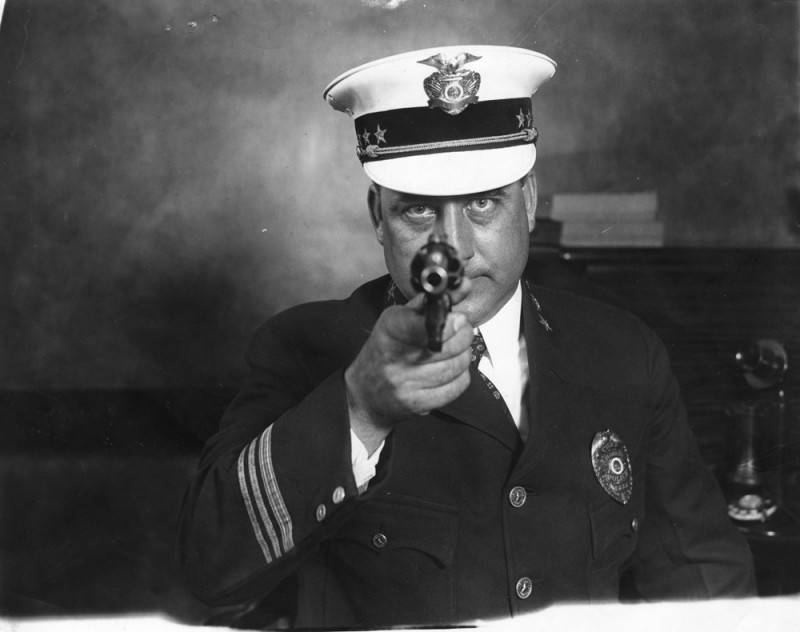
Los Angeles Police Chief James E. Davis holding and pointing his pistol

During Davis' second term as chief, New York mobster Bugsy Siegel arrived in Los Angeles with a mandate from his partners in the National Crime Syndicate to put Southern California vice rackets under top-down control. To serve as Siegel's enforcer, Mickey Cohen was moved into Los Angeles from Chicago. Siegel quietly and quickly seized control of vice operations in the region, which put him at odds with local racketeers, especially Jack Dragna and Guy McAfee. As a result of the reform election of 1938, McAfee and others who had operated the "Combination" moved their operations to Las Vegas, clearing the field for Siegel and his East Coast partners. After Siegel's assassination in June 1947, Cohen was anointed head of the national syndicate's operations in the Southwest – a move that sparked a gang war in Los Angeles. Corruption continued to flourish in Los Angeles. Davis' successor, Chief Clemence B. Horrall, retired on June 28, 1949, amid the LAPD Vice Scandals, which erupted after LAPD whistleblower Sgt. Charles Stoker alleged that Hollywood madam Brenda Allen had paid into a protection racket operated by senior LAPD Vice officers who reported directly to the Chief.

== Controversy ==
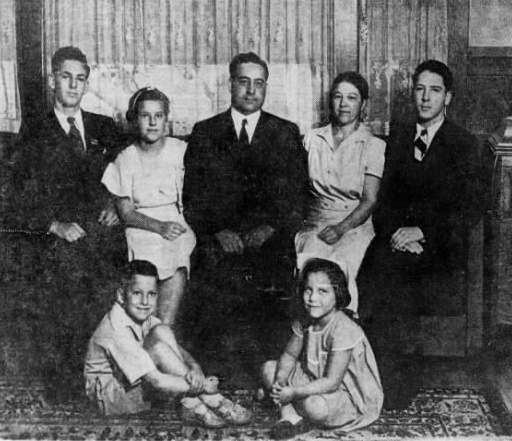
Davis with family in 1933

During his first stint as Police Chief, Davis was involved in the scandal surrounding the Wineville Chicken Coop Murders.

For several months in 1936, during the height of the devastation from the "Dust Bowl", Chief Davis sent LAPD to the California-Arizona border in an attempt to stop the flow of migrants. These migrants were commonly referred to as "Okies", named for the early migrants who fled Oklahoma after the state was ravaged by the Dust Bowl.

In the 1930s, Davis supported Nazi Germany's policies against Jews. While he said that he understood why Jews would "work together to eliminate Hitler" due to their "special racial bond," he said Hitler had been "forced to take action" since Germans could not compete economically with Jews. In 1933, Leon L. Lewis approached him with evidence of American Nazis plotting a rebellion. California National Guardsman Dietrich Gefken, a German immigrant who had participated in the Beer Hall Putsch and bragged about killing communists during the Ruhr uprising, and was a member of a secret paramilitary of the Friends of New Germany, planned to launch an uprising in Southern California using weapons raided from armories in the region. Based on collected intelligence by Lewis, the U.S. Navy arrested two Marines who were selling rifles and 12,000 rounds of ammunition to local Nazis. However, when Lewis initially approached local authorities, Davis rejected his concerns, only assuring him that if the Nazis in Los Angeles ever became a threat to "life and property", the police would "handle it."

Lewis later recounted what happened:

"And before I could proceed, two minutes into it, he stops me and he says, 'You don't get it. Hitler's only trying to save Germany from the Jewish problem. And that the real threat in LA is not from the Nazis and fascists, but it's from all those Communists in Boyle Heights.'"

=== Corruption ===
In 1937, restaurateur Clifford Clinton, a reform-minded businessman who ran a chain of cafeteria-style restaurants, got himself appointed to the Los Angeles County grand jury. Clinton proved to be a gadfly who demanded an investigation of vice in Los Angeles, and was turned down by the grand jury foreman. Angered, he went to Mayor Shaw, who endorsed an independent committee, CIVIC (Citizens Independent Vice Investigating Committee) over the objections of Chief Davis. A corrupt politician who eventually was recalled from office in 1938, Mayor Shaw soon regretted his decision. CIVIC and its citizen volunteers discovered that vice was rampant in Los Angeles. The profits from 600 brothels, 1,800 bookmaking operations, 23,000 slot machines and prostitution were being used to finance political elections, and the LAPD was working hand-in-hand with the underworld. The grand jury rejected CIVIC's report, and after seeking the advice of Superior Court Judge Fletcher Bowron (who had overseen a grand jury that nearly brought down L.A. District Attorney Buron Fitts for corruption), CIVIC issued a minority report that was only published after Judge Bowron's intervention.

A notary public, who testified before the grand jury that the foreman was a corrupt ally of Mayor Shaw, was beaten by police in his own home in the presence of Fitts and the grand jury foreman. Clinton was harassed by city officials, who boosted his taxes and denied him a license to open up a new cafeterias, while the Los Angeles Times attacked him and his restaurant chain. Then his home was bombed, most likely by members of the LAPD Intelligence Squad, and the backlash enveloped Mayor Shaw and Chief Davis. The Intelligence Squad wiretapped Clinton's home, as well as the home of Judge Bowron and other members of the reform movement.

A second bombing brought down Mayor Shaw. Investigator Harry Raymond, a former policeman who worked as a private investigator and was digging up dirt on the Shaw administration, survived a car bombing on January 14, 1938. The bomb was planted by LAPD Captain Earl Kynette, who headed a secret intelligence unit that had Raymond under surveillance. The LAPD and the Los Angeles Times, which was in league with D.A. Fitts, said the bombing was a publicity stunt staged by Clinton and Raymond, but witnesses testified that the police had had Clinton's house under surveillance. Seven members of the intelligence squad refused to testify before the grand jury, pleading their right not to incriminate themselves. Captain Kynette later was convicted of the bombing.

District Attorney Fitts and Chief Davis began a desultory investigation that led the director of the L.A. Chamber of Commerce to send a letter to U.S. Senator Hiram Johnson, which called Fitts a psychopath. The public outcry led to Mayor Shaw being recalled by voters in 1938 and the election of Judge Bowron as mayor.

Davis was called as a witness at the trial of Captain Kynette. It was revealed that the LAPD had been operating a vast intelligence operation targeting not only reformers but politicians, judges, and even a federal agent investigating corruption in San Francisco. Chief Davis did poorly on the stand—the judge called his testimony "a debris of words"—and he was forced from office by Mayor Bowron, who went on to sack many of the senior officers of the LAPD.

== Later life and death ==
Davis died on June 20, 1949, in a Helena, Montana, hospital from the effects of a stroke suffered while visiting a nearby ranch.

== In popular culture ==
- In the 2008 film Changeling, based on these events, Davis was played by Colm Feore.
- In James Ellroy's 2014 and 2019 novels Perfidia and This Storm, Ellroy provides a fictionalized version of James E. Davis in a supporting role.

== See also ==
- List of Los Angeles Police Department Chiefs of Police

Police appointments
Preceded by R. Lee Heath	Chief of LAPD; 1926–1931	Succeeded by Roy E. Steckel
Preceded by Roy E. Steckel	Chief of LAPD; 1933–1939	Succeeded by Arthur C. Hohmann
