= David A. Davidson =

Los Angeles chief of police, 1938–1939

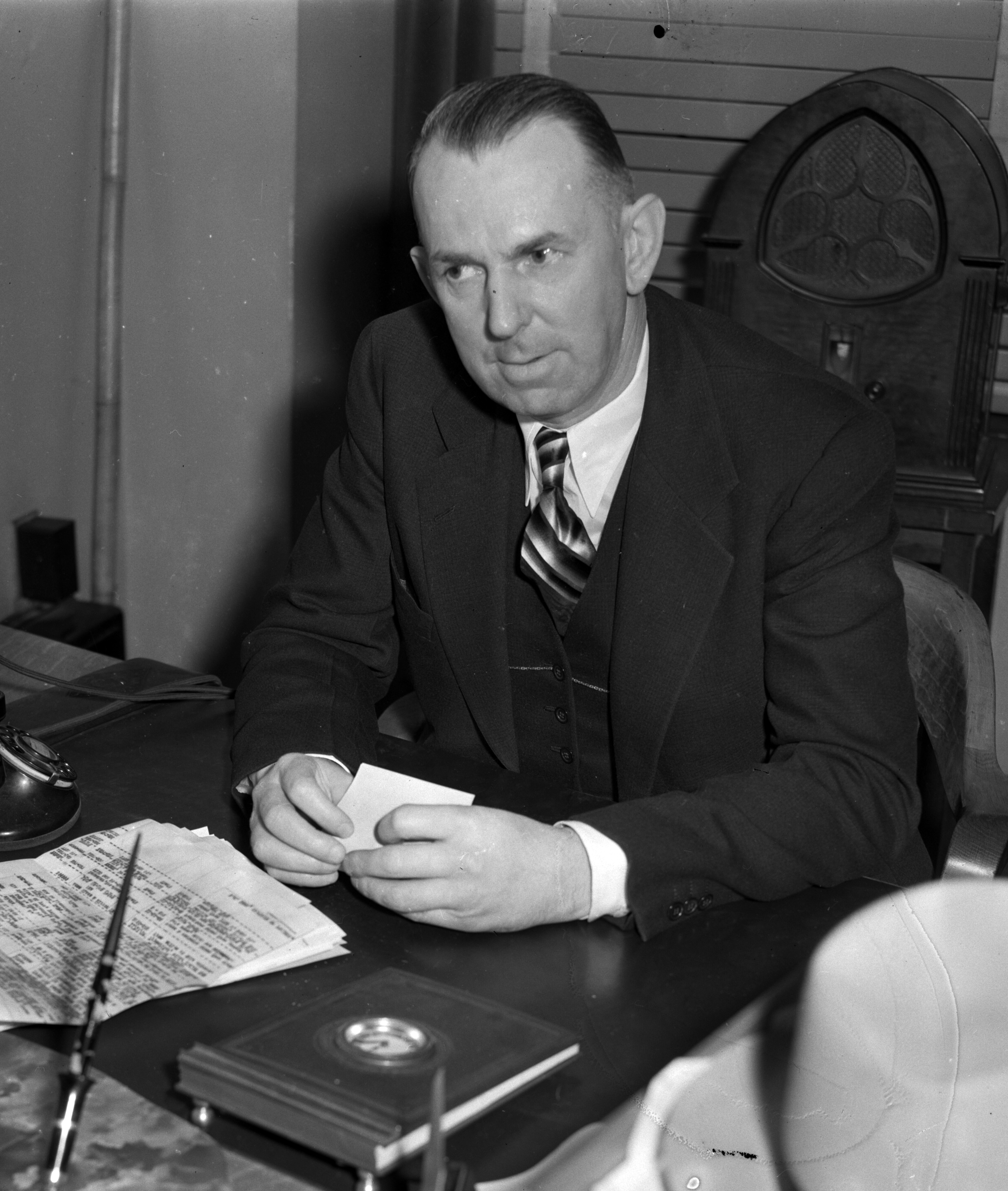
- Davidson in 1938
- Police career
- Country: United States
- Department: Los Angeles Police Department
- Rank: Chief of Police 1938-39

David A. Davidson was the 39th Chief of Police of the Los Angeles Police Department, succeeding James E. Davis. Promoted from the rank of inspector, Davidson served as acting Chief of Police from November 19, 1938 to June 23, 1939, and was succeeded by Arthur C. Hohmann, a police lieutenant who was appointed chief by the Police Commission. During his term of office, Davidson authorized policewomen to be armed. Under his directive, in 1939, L.A.P.D. policewomen were ordered to go through fire arms training, after which they were issued .38 caliber revolvers.

In 1939, Los Angeles Mayor Fletcher Bowron, a reformer who had closed down 600 bordellos in L.A. after assuming office in a drive against corruption, and his Police Commission had all the extant L.A.P.D. promotion lists jettisoned and a new round of testing implemented. The office of chief was officially put into play, and acting chief Davidson declined to test for it. Davidson said he was not interested in continuing as chief as he did not want "to be pushed around every time a new administration took office."

Lieutenant Hohmann placed first on the test, and became the official selection of the Police Commission. The members of the Commission had been personally appointed by Bowron, who honored the appointment.

Police appointments
Preceded by James E. Davis	Chief of LAPD; 1938–1939	Succeeded by Arthur C. Hohmann
