= Brenda Allen =

American madam based in Los Angeles, California

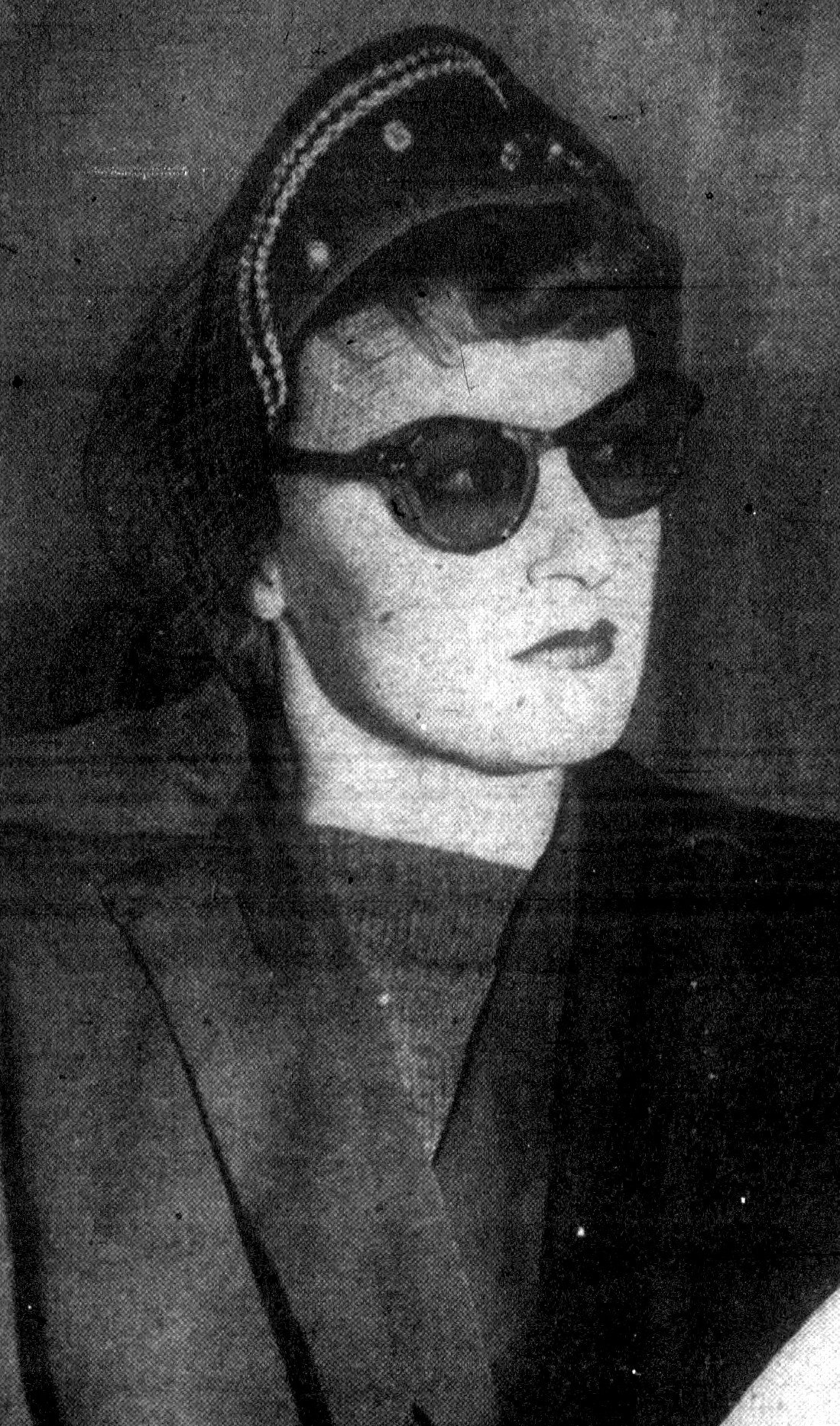
- Allen, circa 1951
- Born: 1913 or 1914
- Other names: Mrs. Marie Mitchell, Marie Brooks
- Occupations: Brothel owner, prostitute
- Known for: Brenda Allen scandal
- Spouse: Robert H. Cash (m. 1960; div. 1961)

Brenda Allen (aka Marie Mitchell) was an American madam based in Los Angeles, California, whose arrest in 1948 triggered a scandal that led to the attempted reform of the Los Angeles Police Department (LAPD). Allen received police protection due to her relationship with Sergeant Elmer V. Jackson of the LAPD's administrative vice squad, who reportedly was her lover.

== Early career ==
Allen began as a prostitute in Los Angeles in the 1930s, though she already had several prior morals charges in other US cities. She rose to prominence around 1940 as the successor to Ann Forrester (aka "Black Widow"), who had previously run a $5,000-a-week prostitution syndicate but was convicted and sentenced to prison. Forrester had supposedly found her working as a street-corner prostitute on "a seedy stretch of Sixth Street between Union and Alvarado".

Allen ultimately had about 114 women working for her, and brought in an average of $9,000 a day. Allen took 50 percent of the income and spent a third of that on pays offs to police, and fees from doctors, lawyers, and bailbondsmen. She later testified that she paid cops $50 in protection money for each woman working in her prostitution ring.According to a 1972 history of the LAPD, "She subscribed to telephone answering service used by physicians and lawyers, occasionally inserted chaste ads in actors' directories, and distributed her phone number to cabbies, bartenders, and bellhops; however, she accepted only the wealthiest applicants." Surveilled by the vice squad and arrested at least 20 times, she was always released the following morning.

== Scandal ==
After an attempted robbery of Brenda Allen and Sergeant Elmer V. Jackson in which Jackson shot and killed the perpetrator, the press and other members of the police became aware of their relationship. Wiretaps led to the arrest of Allen and the resulting publicity to the convening of a grand jury. Her 1948 pandering conviction drew a 360 day sentence.

The publicity from the grand jury revelations of police corruption led to the resignation of L.A.P.D. Chief Clemence B. Horrall and his replacement by retired Marine Major General William A. Worton, who had served with the Marine Corps' III Amphibious Corps at the Battle of Okinawa.

== Reform ==
Worton was appointed by L.A. mayor Fletcher Bowron on a temporary basis. He served from July 1949 to August 1950, when he was replaced as chief by William H. Parker, who had served the general as a special aide and then as head of Internal Affairs (Horrall's deputy chief, Joe Reed, also resigned after being shamed by grand jury testimony.) It was Parker, in his 16-year reign as police chief, who is credited with cleaning up the L.A.P.D.

== Later life ==
Allen reportedly worked in a department store "years later".

== Cultural impact ==
The relationship between Allen and Jackson was depicted in author John Gregory Dunne's 1977 novel True Confessions, which was later turned into a movie starring Robert de Niro and Robert Duvall (as Jackson).

Brenda Allen was played by Joan Van Ark in the CBS made-for-television film Shakedown on the Sunset Strip (1988).

The story of Brenda Allen also plays a role in the 2011 video game L.A. Noire. In an attempt to divert media attention from Allen's arrest and protect themselves, the corrupt police chief and other public officials expose an affair between German singer Elsa Lichtman and the game's protagonist, Cole Phelps, resulting in him being demoted and disgraced.

The scandal appears in the James Ellroy novels The Black Dahlia, The Big Nowhere, Perfidia and This Storm, and is mentioned extensively in the book LAPD '53 for which Ellroy provided text to photographs provided by the Los Angeles Police Museum.

== See also ==
- History of the Los Angeles Police Department
