= Perfidia (disambiguation) =

"Perfidia" is a popular Mexican song.

Perfidia may also refer to:

- Perfidia, a 1997 novel by Judith Rossner
- Perfidia (novel), a 2014 novel by James Ellroy
- "Perfidia" (Journeyman), an episode of the TV show Journeyman
- The Man in Grey, a 1943 British drama film released in Spain and Portugal as Perfidia
- Les Dames du Bois de Boulogne, a 1945 French film released in Italy as Perfidia
- Perfidia (film), a 2009 Bolivian film directed by Rodrigo Bellott, starring Gonzalo Valenzuela
