= Arthur C. Hohmann =

American police chief

Arthur Clarence Hohmann
- Born: November 12, 1895
- Died: April 9, 1985 (aged 89)
- Police career
- Country: United States
- Department: Los Angeles Police Department
- Rank: Chief of Police 1939-41

Arthur Clarence Hohmann (November 12, 1895 – April 9, 1985) served as Los Angeles Police Department Chief of Police from 1939 to 1941, when he voluntarily relinquished the position during a police corruption scandal. Hohmann was the 40th Chief of the L.A.P.D., succeeding acting Chief David A. Davidson in July 1939. He previously had been a lieutenant.

== Becoming Chief ==
Los Angeles Mayor Fletcher Bowron had preferred that Captain R.R. McDonald become chief, but he left the decision up the Police Commission, which decided to base the appointment on merit. The civil service exam for chief was a two part test, which was traditional with the L.A.P.D., when testing was first implemented for promotions. The first part of an L.A.P.D. civil service exam was written, which accounted for 95% of the score, followed by an oral exam. Those who took the test were given a score and placed on a promotion list, off of which promotions were supposed to be made.

In 1939, Mayor Bowron, a reformer who had closed down 600 bordellos in L.A. after assuming office in a drive against corruption, and his Police Commission had all the extant promotion lists jettisoned and new round of testing implemented. The office of chief was officially put up for grabs, and acting chief Davidson declined to test for it.

The written exam for chief was undertaken by 175 candidates. Of these, 31 qualified to take an oral examination. Lieutenant Hohmann placed first on the list of candidates and thus won the position, which surprised many. (Acting Captain William H. Parker, a future police chief who is credited with cleaning up the L.A.P.D. during the 1950s, placed eighth.) Mayor Bowron appointed Hohmann chief as the official selection of the Police Commission. The members of the Commission had been personally appointed by Bowron.

== Reassignment ==
Hohmann's reign as L.A.P.D chief was brief. During his time as chief, he created a new headquarters division, which he himself personally oversaw with Captain McDonald as his administrative officer.

He was succeeded by Clemence B. Horrall on June 16, 1941, after he voluntarily took a demotion to deputy chief after he had become ensnared in a police corruption trial that had embarrassed Mayor Fletcher Bowron. Once Horrall became chief, he demoted his former mentor to lieutenant. After accepting the demotion, Hohmann sued the L.A.P.D. to get his rank restored. The police corruption trial and Hohmann's struggles with Horrall further upset an already demoralized police force.

Ironically, Horrall himself would resign as chief in 1949, when he too became ensnared in a police corruption scandal during the Brenda Allen vice scandal. Horrall had become chief when Hohman, under pressure from Los Angeles Mayor Fletcher Bowron, stepped down.

Police appointments
Preceded by David A. Davidson	Chief of LAPD; 1939–1941	Succeeded by Clemence B. Horrall
