= Roy E. Steckel =

Chief of LAPD (1887–1950)

Roy Edmund Steckel
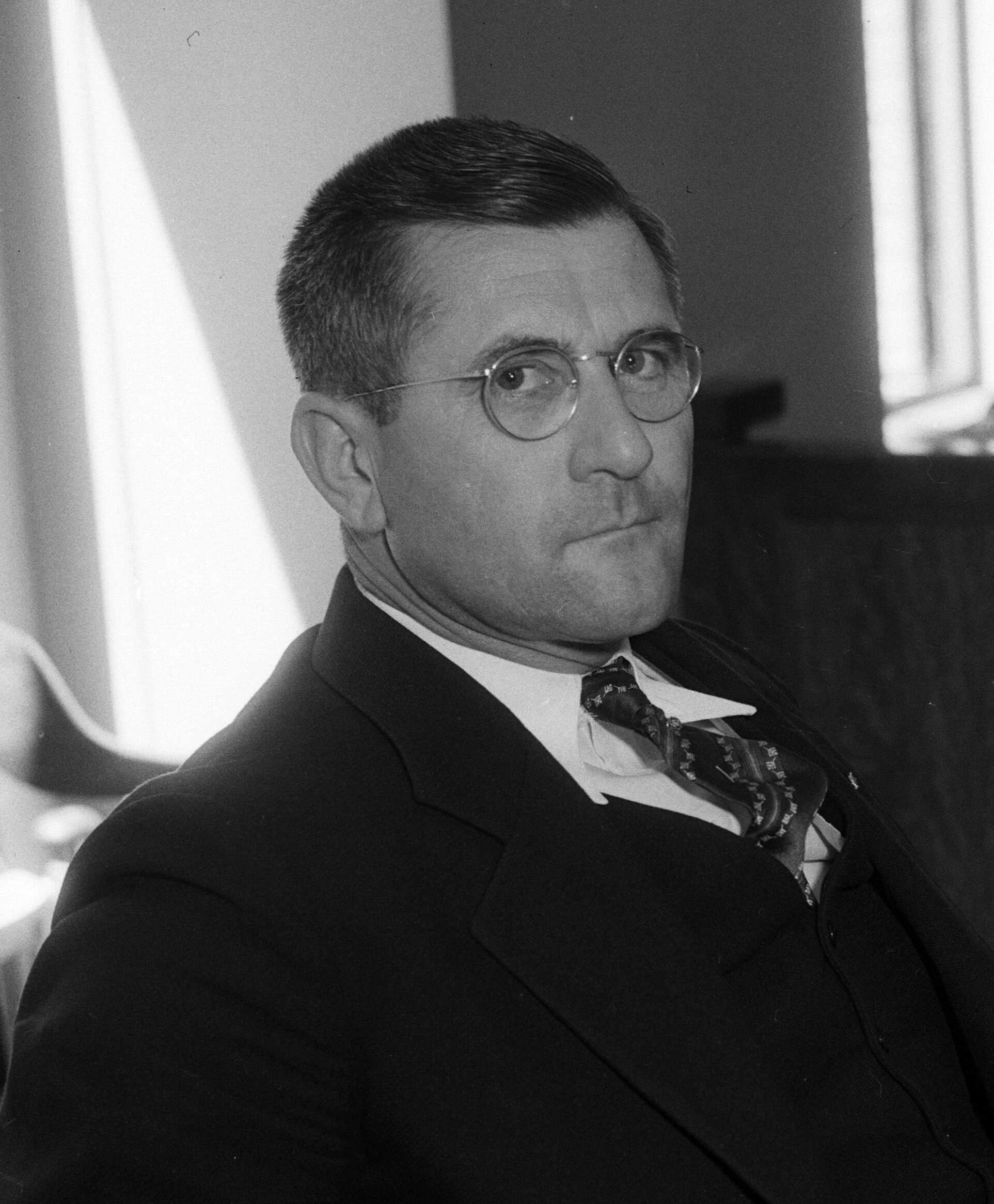
- Steckel in the 1930s
- Born: October 17, 1887; Nashville, Tennessee, US
- Died: November 14, 1950 (aged 63); Los Angeles, California, US
- Police career
- Country: United States
- Department: Los Angeles Police Department
- Service years: LAPD Chief; December 30, 1929; August 9, 1933
- Rank: Chief of Police

Roy Edmund Steckel (October 17, 1887 – November 14, 1950) was the Los Angeles Police Department Chief of Police from December 30, 1929, to August 9, 1933. He succeeded and was succeeded as chief by James E. "Two-Guns" Davis. During Steckel's reign as Chief of Police, Los Angeles hosted the 1932 Summer Olympic Games. The L.A.P.D. employed 800 duly sworn police officers. According to the L.A.P.D.'s official site, crime was very low during the Olympics, with there being only "two robberies, eight burglaries, 39 thefts, and 10 auto thefts".

Steckel was dismissed as chief by the incoming mayor Frank L. Shaw, who had run on a platform that included calling for Steckel's dismissal. Under Steckel's regime, Mayor John Clinton Porter appointed a former detective with the L.A.P.D. to head up an intelligence operation aimed at both the police department itself and city officials. L.A.P.D. intelligence operatives were bolstered with private investigators, who were given captain's badges. The L.A. City Council disbanded the intelligence operation after three years. The incident led Time Magazine to term the L.A.P.D. "super-snoopers".

== Innovations ==
During Steckel's term as Police Chief, radio dispatching was first implemented. Called "the most modern municipal police radio system in the world", the radio network transmitted from a transmitter located in Elysian Park and utilized eight switchboards at City Hall. Forty-four patrol cars were equipped with radio communications, though two-way broadcasting did not come until 1938. The radio network reduced police response times to less than three minutes.

Under Steckel, L.A.P.D.'s first "air patrol", consisting of ten police officers assigned to a fixed wing squadron, was implemented in 1931.

== Controversies ==
During the first years of the Great Depression, there was a movement in Los Angeles and California to deny Mexican immigrants welfare benefits in a general drive to repatriate them to Mexico, ostensibly to alleviate unemployment. This led to California's Mexican Repatriation Program. In 1931, Chief Steckel claimed, "Most of our crime problems are caused by aliens without respect for the laws of the country."

Police appointments
Preceded by James E. Davis	Chief of LAPD; 1929–1933	Succeeded by James E. Davis
