= Clemence B. Horrall =

American police chief

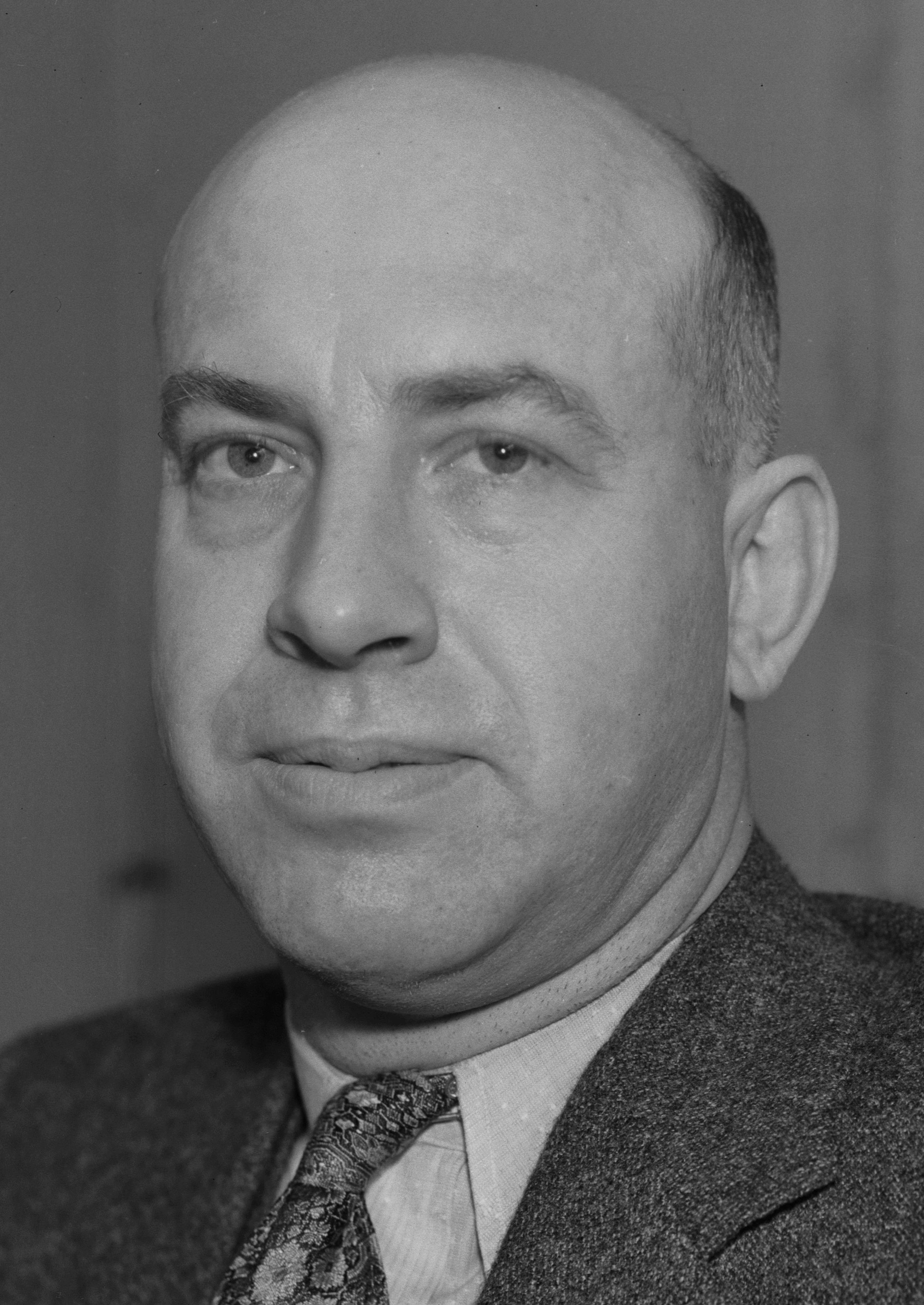
- Horrall in the 1930s
- Born: September 24, 1895
- Died: October 4, 1960 (aged 65)
- Police career
- Country: United States
- Department: Los Angeles Police Department
- Rank: Chief of police 1941–1949

Clemence Brooks Horrall (September 24, 1895 – October 4, 1960) was Los Angeles Police Department chief of police from June 16, 1941, when he succeeded Arthur C. Hohmann to serve as the 41st chief of the L.A.P.D., to June 28, 1949, when he resigned under pressure during a grand jury investigation of police corruption. Clemence Brooks Horrall was born in Washington, Indiana and graduated from Washington State University. Horrall had become chief when Hohmann, under pressure from Los Angeles Mayor Fletcher Bowron, voluntarily took a demotion to deputy chief after he had become ensnared in a police corruption trial that had embarrassed the mayor.

During his tenure as chief many significant events occurred that would shape Los Angeles during the decade of the 1940s, when the population of the city proper surged from 1.5 million to nearly 2 million people. Events such as World War II, Japanese-American relocation and internment (see Japanese American internment), the Zoot Suit Riots of 1943 and the Black Dahlia homicide in 1947 roiled the city, as did the Brenda Allen vice scandal of 1948–49 that led to Chief Horrall's resignation after it was found that officers involved with the Hollywood madam perjured themselves under oath during grand jury testimony, as did Horrall himself. He resigned in 1949, succeeded by Marine Major General William A. Worton.

Following his resignation, Horrall and four other high ranking LAPD officers would be indicted on perjury charges. In September 1949, Horrall and his Lieutenant Rudy Wellpot would each be acquitted, with the trials of the other three charged LAPD officers still remaining in effect at the time.

Clemence Horrall died in 1960 from a heart attack and was buried in Forest Lawn Memorial Park, by Hollywood Hills.

== In popular culture ==
- When Jack Webb's radio program Dragnet commenced in 1949, Horrall's endorsement of the program was acknowledged at the end of every episode. That tradition continued with W. A. Worton and continued throughout the various spin offs of Dragnet.
- In the 2011 Team Bondi video game L.A. Noire, LAPD Chief of Police William Worrell is directly based on Clemence B. Horall.
- He is portrayed by Michael McGrady in the 2013 television series, Mob City.
- Chief "Call-Me-Jack" Horall is portrayed in the first two books of author James Ellroy's 2nd L.A Quartet - Perfidia and This Storm.

== See also ==
- List of Los Angeles Police Department chiefs of police

Police appointments
Preceded by Arthur C. Hohmann	Chief of LAPD; 1941–1949	Succeeded by William A. Worton
