= William A. Worton =

United States Marine Corps general (1897–1973)

William Arthur Worton
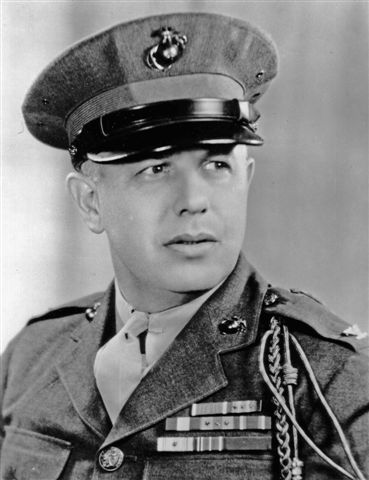
- William A. Worton as a colonel, USMC
- Born: January 4, 1897; Boston, Massachusetts, US
- Died: July 25, 1973 (aged 76); La Jolla, California, US
- Military career
- Allegiance: United States
- Branch: United States Marine Corps
- Service years: 1917–1949
- Rank: Major general
- Commands: Chief of staff of the III Amphibious Corps
- Conflicts: World War I World War II: Battle of Guam; Battle of Iwo Jima; Battle of Okinawa
- Awards: Legion of Merit; Bronze Star Medal (2); Purple Heart
- Predecessor: Clemence B. Horrall
- Successor: William H. Parker
- Police career
- Country: United States
- Department: Los Angeles Police Department
- Service years: 1949–50
- Rank: 42nd Chief of police 1949–50

William Arthur Worton (January 4, 1897 – July 25, 1973) was a World War I combat veteran, a U.S. espionage chief in 1930s China, a Marine Corps major general who served in the Pacific Theater during World War II, and an interim Chief of the Los Angeles Police Department from June 1949 to 1950.

== Early life ==
Worton was born on January 4, 1897, in Boston, Massachusetts. He first attended the Boston Latin School and subsequently Harvard University, where he earned his Bachelor of Arts degree. Worton then attended the Boston University Law School and graduated with Bachelor of Laws degree. Worton enlisted in the Massachusetts Naval Militia, where he was commissioned second lieutenant and was subsequently transferred to the Marine Corps Reserve with the rank of first lieutenant on March 29, 1917.

He was assigned to the 79th Company, 2nd Battalion, 6th Marine Regiment and sent overseas. Worton saw combat service in France, including Verdun and Chateau-Thierry, as well as at the Battle of Belleau Wood, where he was seriously wounded and gassed on June 6, 1918 while leading his platoon. He was evacuated to the United States in September of the same year and promoted to the rank of captain.

After the war, Worton remained in the Marine Corps and served with 2nd Marine Brigade in Santo Domingo for next two years. He returned to the United States in December 1920 and was assigned to the Portsmouth Naval Shipyard, where he was stationed in the local Marine base. Worton also spent some time at the Marine base at the Naval Torpedo Station in Keyport, Washington.

At the beginning of December 1923, Worton was assigned to the Marine detachment within the American Legation Guard in Peking, China, and served in this capacity until May 1926, when he was transferred back to the United States and assigned to the Marine Corps Base Quantico, Virginia. During his time at Quantico base, Worton attended the Marine Corps School and graduated from the Company Officers Course.

He was sent back to China with the 3rd Marine Brigade in May 1927 and spent there next two years. Worton returned to the United States in July 1929 and was appointed commanding officer of the Marine detachment aboard battleship USS Oklahoma.

On 8 September 1931, Worton was assigned again to the American Legation Guard in Peking, China, but his job was little but different than his previous Marine Corps duties. Now, as an undercover intelligence officer, he was assigned as "Chinese Language Student" to the Special Language Course. He spent six hours every day for three years with studying of Chinese Language. After this very difficult job, he was qualified as a Chinese language translator and interpreter. During that time, Worton was also promoted to the rank of major on May 29, 1934.

== US Naval espionage service before World War II ==
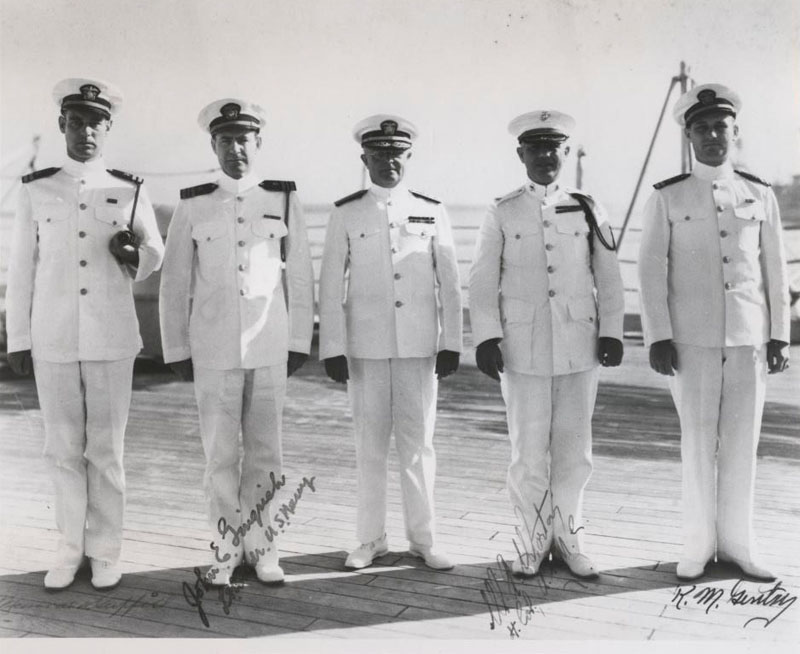
Worton (second from right) during his service as force Marine officer, Battleship Division 3, with members of his staff on USS Idaho.

In 1935, having already served in China for ten years as a Marine officer, Major Worton was assigned to the Far East Section of the Office of Naval Intelligence. Given a "cover story" as "a disgruntled officer leaving the Corps to establish a business in the International Settlement in Shanghai", he returned to China once again, and began to recruit agents who agreed to travel to Japan to secretly collect information for the US Navy. One of these may have been the French Jesuit Priest and philosopher, Pierre Teilhard de Chardin.

Working with closely with Chiang Kai-shek's secret police chief, Dai Li, Worton performed his assignment ably until he returned to Washington in June 1936. He spent almost twelve years on Marine assignments in China during the 1920s and 1930s and conducted the first American espionage operations against Japan using agents recruited in mainland China.

During 1938, Worton served as force Marine officer, Battleship Division 3, under Rear Admiral John D. Wainwright.

== World War II Service ==
With the United States entry into World War II, Worton served as commander of the 2nd Battalion, 6th Marines. His unit was sent as a part of 1st Provisional Marine Brigade under the command Brigadier General John Marston to Iceland, where Worton served until March 1942. He was promoted to rank of colonel on January 1, 1942. He subsequently sailed to England and served there as military advisor.

In September 1943, Worton was transferred to Marine Corps Base Camp Pendleton, California, where 5th Marine Division was activated under the command of Major General Keller E. Rockey. He was appointed division's chief of staff.

During the summer of 1944, Worton was transferred to 3rd Marine Division under the command of Major General Allen H. Turnage. He was promoted to the rank of brigadier general in September 1944 and appointed assistant division commander. He served with this division during the Battle of Guam and also during the Battle of Iwo Jima. For his service with this unit, he was decorated with two Bronze Star Medals.

As a brigadier general, Worton served with the III Amphibious Corps (IIIAC) during the Battle of Okinawa, being elevated to chief of staff of IIIAC on June 30, 1945. IIIAC was tasked with assaulting the Tokyo Plain during Operation Downfall, the planned Invasion of Japan.

When the war ended after the atomic bombings of Hiroshima and Nagasaki, IIIAC subsequently was tasked as part of the American forces designated to occupy northern China to accept the surrender of the Japanese forces in the region. As part of that mission, Worton was with an advance party to Shanghai, China. In northern China, IIIAC battled with Chinese puppet troops aligned with Japan (many of whom later switched allegiance to Chiang Kai-shek) and with Communist guerrillas and regulars. Worton was later decorated with the Legion of Merit by the Army for his service in North China.

== Los Angeles Police Chief ==
Worton was appointed the 42nd chief of the L.A.P.D. on June 30, 1949, by Los Angeles Mayor Fletcher Bowron after the resignation of Chief Clemence B. Horrall in the wake of the Brenda Allen scandal. Horrall's assistant chief, Joe Reed, also eventually resigned after Worton took office, as he too was ensnared by the police corruption scandal.

Worton was tasked by Mayor Bowron with the job of cleaning up the department. A little more than a year later, Worton resigned on August 9, 1950, and was replaced by his chief of Internal Affairs, William H. Parker, whom he had groomed for the office.

== Later life ==
After his stint with LAPD, Worton lived in Los Angeles, Carlsbad, and La Jolla, California. He died at the U.S. Naval Hospital in San Diego and is buried in Arlington National Cemetery.

== Decorations ==
Major General Worton's ribbon bar:

1st Row	Legion of Merit		Bronze Star Medal with Gold Star with Combat "V"	Purple Heart
2nd Row	Navy Presidential Unit Citation	Marine Corps Expeditionary Medal with three service stars	World War I Victory Medal with three battle clasps	Yangtze Service Medal
3rd Row	American Defense Service Medal with base clasp	American Campaign Medal	European-African-Middle Eastern Campaign Medal	Asiatic-Pacific Campaign Medal with four service stars
4th Row	World War II Victory Medal	Officer of the Legion of Honour (France)	Order of the Cloud and Banner with Special Cravat (4th Class) (Republic of China)	Order of Military Merit (Dominican Republic)

== See also ==
- List of Los Angeles Police Department Chiefs of Police

Police appointments
Preceded by Clemence B. Horrall	Chief of LAPD; 1949–1950	Succeeded by William H. Parker
