= Perfidia (novel) =

2014 novel by James Ellroy

- First edition cover
- Author: James Ellroy
- Cover artist: Jacket design by Chip Kidd
- Language: English
- Series: The Second L.A. Quartet
- Genre: Crime fiction, noir, historical fiction, historical romance
- Publisher: Alfred A. Knopf, William Heinemann Ltd/Cornerstone (Waterstones's edition)
- Publication date: September 9, 2014, September 11, 2014 (Waterstones's edition)
- Publication place: United States
- Media type: Print (hardback and paperback), audio CD, audio download, and Kindle
- Pages: 720 pp (first edition, hardcover)
- ISBN: 978-0-307-95699-6 (first edition, hardcover), ISBN 978-0-434-02052-2 (Waterstones's edition, hardcover), ISBN 978-0385-35321-2 (eBook)
- OCLC: 866615100
- Dewey Decimal: 813'/.54—dc23
- LC Class: PS3555.L6274P47 2014
- Followed by: This Storm

Perfidia is a historical romance and crime fiction novel by American author James Ellroy. Published in 2014, it is the first novel in the second L.A. Quartet, referring to his four prior novels from the first L.A. Quartet. Perfidia was released September 9, 2014. A Waterstones exclusive limited edition of Perfidia was released September 11, 2014, and includes an essay by Ellroy himself titled "Ellroy's History – Then and Now." The title, Perfidia, is Italian for the word perfidy, (see also perfidia) and is also the name of the big band song, Perfidia.

== Premise ==
The main characters are Hideo Ashida, a Japanese Los Angeles Police Department (LAPD) chemist, Kay Lake, a young woman looking for adventure, the real life William H. Parker, a gifted LAPD captain with a drinking problem, and Dudley Smith, an LAPD sergeant born in Dublin, Ireland, and raised in Los Angeles. The novel is told in real time, covering 23 days with the dates and the time the chapters and events are occurring, as well as through Kay Lake's diary. An entry from Kay Lake's diary begins Perfidia, followed by a bootleg transmitter radio broadcast on Friday, December 5, 1941, being broadcast by real-life Gerald L. K. Smith. The first chapter introduces the reader to Hideo Ashida, on Saturday, December 6, 1941, at 9:08 am. Since many fictional and real-life characters appear in Perfidia, many from his prior novels, Ellroy added a dramatis personæ, which notes the previous appearances of characters in Perfidia, as well as short summaries for some of the characters. Characters appearing in previous Ellroy novels include Ward Littell, Scottie Bennett, Claire de Haven, Mike Bruening, Dick Carlisle, Dot Rothstein, Buzz Meeks, Lee Blanchard, Bucky Bleichert and Saul Lesnik.

In the book, numerous real-life characters appear or are named, such as Harry Cohn, a young John Fitzgerald Kennedy, Gerald L. K. Smith, Charles Coughlin, William H. Parker, Clemence B. Horrall, James E. Davis, Jack Webb, Gregg Toland, Sergei Rachmaninoff, Bette Davis, Bugsy Siegel, Leonard Bernstein or Bertolt Brecht.

== Plot ==
On December 6, 1941, Agent Lee Blanchard, chemist Hideo Ashida, and detectives Buzz Meeks and Dudley Smith, all of the from the LAPD, investigate the robbery of a pharmacy. Hideo discovers scraps of cloth, identified as part of a military police armband. During that week, a military police officer had committed several rapes. After identifying him, Dudley Smith and his men shot him dead. That same night, the four members of the Watanabe family are found dead in their Highland Park home in what appears to be suicide by seppuku. However, fascist propaganda, a shortwave radio and the remains of a silencer identical to the one found in the pharmacy robbery are found in the Watanabe home. The autopsy confirmed suspicions: it was a homicide. Furthermore, Nancy, the family's daughter, had had an abortion.

After the attack on Pearl Harbor, Lee Blanchard's girlfriend, Kay Lake, tries unsuccessfully to enlist in the armed forces. At the recruiting office she meets Scott Bennett, with whom she begins a romance. Detective Parker urges Kay to infiltrate communist circles in Los Angeles, specifically Claire De Heaven's group. Boxer Bucky Bleichert seeks to join the LAPD, but his father's pro-Nazi background makes it difficult. To gain entry, he informs the FBI about Hideo's mother's fascist sympathies. Hideo, who had a homosexual attraction to Bucky in high school, is shocked after learning this from journalist Sid Hudgens.

Hideo discovers that the weapons used in both the pharmacy robbery and the Watanabe home were silenced Lugers, purchased from a fascist club in the city. Smith, meanwhile, seeks to do business with Ace Kwan, the leader of the Hop Sing Tong, Bugsy Siegel and Harry Cohn, the real-life head of Columbia Pictures, who arranges a successful date with Bette Davis. Investigating photos of the pharmacy robbery, he identifies the robber: Huey Cressmeyer, a young pro-Nazi criminal and drug addict who used his Military Police armband to mislead the police. Furthermore, Huey, as a fascist, knew the Watanabes: he was also the one who fired the Luger inside the house, before the murder. The chief of police Horrall wants the investigation completed before the new year, concerned about the war and the FBI wiretaps into corruption (the Brenda Allen scandal) within the LAPD. Kay and Ashida help remove the bugs. Jack Webb, a civilian aide for the LAPD, tells investigators that a white man dressed in purple was present shortly before the Watanabes' murders. The same man ran over and killed a man named Larkin, a member of British Intelligence, on December 7. However, Dudley and his men are seeking a Japanese culprit, driven by political motives, regardless of the truth behind Watanabe's crime.

Ace Kwan's niece is murdered, sparking a gang war between the Hop Sing and the rival triad, the Four Families. Scotty Bennett joins the LAPD under orders from Dudley, who orders him to kill an innocent member of the Four Families, when the real culprits behind Ace Kwan's niece's murder were Japanese accomplices of Huey. Kwan and Dudley murder them in Griffith Park. Former police chief, Jim Davis intervenes in the Chinatown riots, seeking a truce among the Tongs. Meanwhile, Kay continues to infiltrate Claire De Heaven's circle and Lee and Scotty fight over Kay, and Lee is knocked out. Parker and Ashida are searching for James Namura, a fifth columnist friend of the Watanabes, who is hiding in Ace Kwan's building (the Tong is trying to make money by hiding Japanese people and charging them for it). However, after a heated argument with Kwan, Parker is removed from the case. Also, Parker is outraged by Preston Exley and Fletcher Bowron plans to profit from the Japanese internment by real estate projects. Dudley and his men find a false culprit, the mentally disabled Fujio Shudo, and fabricate evidence, forcing Ashida to do that, and succeeding to gaslight Shudo.

An FBI raid results in the arrest of Claire and Kay. Scotty gives Ashida secret information collected by Dudley: traces of shrimp oil on the Watanabes' bodies lead to the discovery that Japanese farmland has been contaminated. Dudley begins a romance with Claire and awaits a visit from his illegitimate daughter, Beth Short. After discovering from Beth's blind friend, Tommy, that his daughter was raped by Marines now stationed in California, Dudley and Scotty murder them. Hideo investigates Pierce Patchett, Preston Exley's partner. He discovers that in addition to being a real estate speculator, Patchett is the central node of a spy network that included Larkins and the Watanabes.

Dudley Smith, after being brutally rejected by Bette Davis and falling gravely ill, leads a failed mission into Mexico with Ashida to steal a heroin stash and finance their consortium, only to be betrayed and captured by the Mexican police. Saved by Ashida, who, using information from Patchett, locates a Japanese submarine containing the money they used to buy their freedom, Dudley uncovers his rivals' plans to infiltrate Los Angeles as saboteurs before blowing up the submarine and its crew. Upon his return, a melancholic Dudley sadly watches Bette's Christmas party, where her daughter Beth is dancing.

Hideo shares his discoveries with Parker, who realizes that one of the phone booths used by the fifth column organization is near the Douglas factory, where Jim Davis is the head of security. Parker talks to Jim, and he confesses. His motivation for the murders was twofold: personal revenge because Nancy Watanabe (with whom he was in love) had aborted his child, and to silence the family, as they had begun to have doubts about the impending attack on Pearl Harbor, which the Network was monitoring via shortwave radios. Davis also confesses to running over Jim Larkin to silence him. Finally, he threatens Parker: if he arrests him, he will destroy the Los Angeles Police Department with the compromising recordings he has. Parker leaves the scene without arresting him, leaving the crime unpunished to protect the fragile institution to which he has dedicated his life.

== Reviews and reception ==
Perfidia was on The New York Times Best Sellers list for hardcover fiction at number 16 on September 28, 2014. It also was an Editors' Choice at The New York Times on September 12, 2014. NPR added Perfidia as one of the best books of 2014 out of approximately 250 titles. Perfidia was also one of the eighty books nominated for the 2015 Folio Prize by the Folio Prize Academy.
