= William H. Parker (police officer) =

Los Angeles police chief, 1950–1966

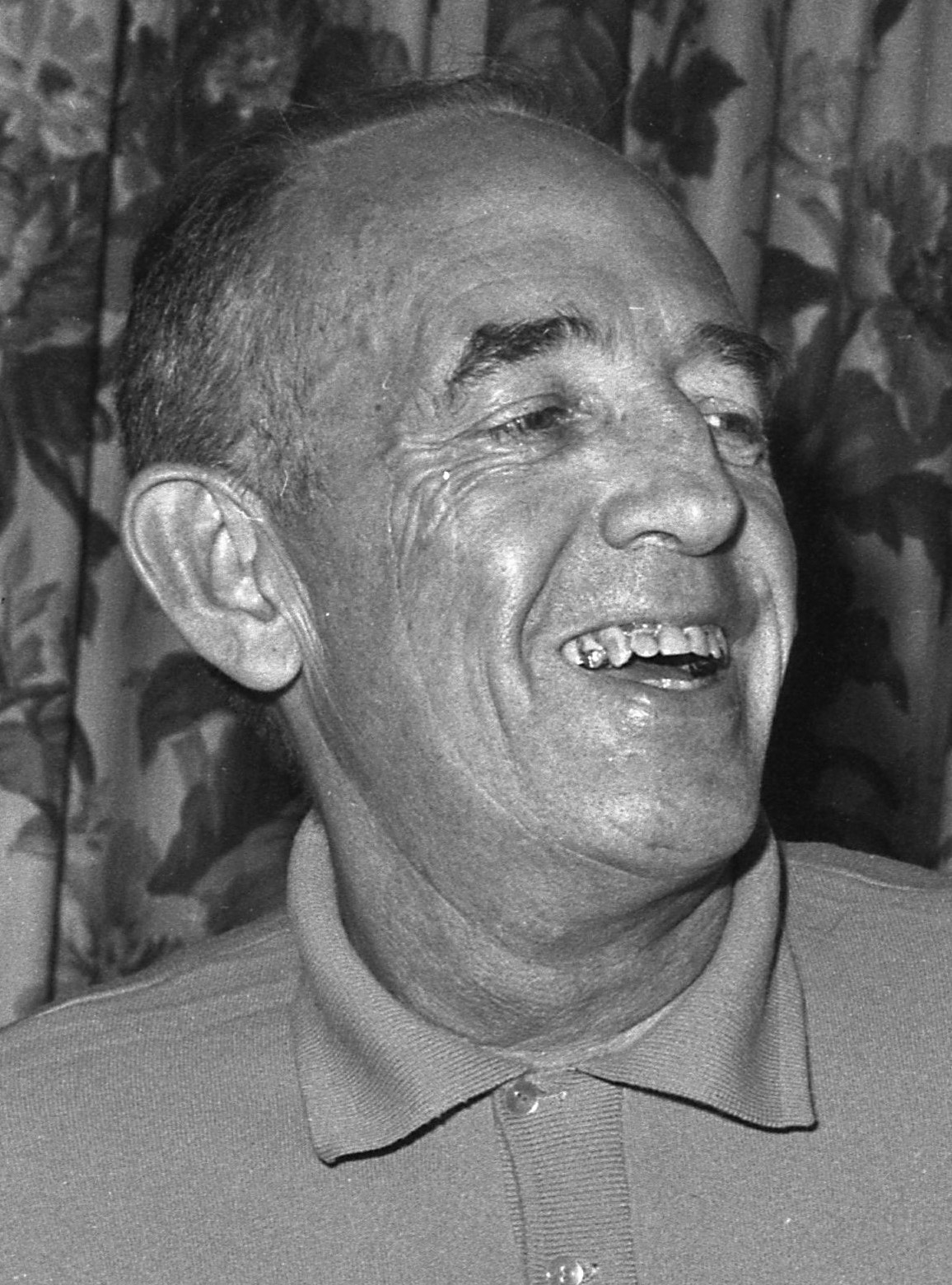
- Parker in 1965
- Born: William Henry Parker III; June 21, 1905; Lead, South Dakota, U.S.
- Died: July 16, 1966 (aged 61); Los Angeles, California, U.S.
- Police career
- Country: United States
- Department: Los Angeles Police Department
- Service years: 1927–1966
- Rank: Chief of Police

William Henry Parker III (June 21, 1905 – July 16, 1966) was an American law enforcement officer who was Chief of the Los Angeles Police Department (LAPD) from 1950 until his death in 1966. To date, he is the longest-serving LAPD police chief. Parker has been called "Los Angeles' greatest and most controversial chief of police." The former headquarters of the LAPD, the Parker Center, was named after him. During his tenure, the LAPD was known for police brutality and racism; Parker himself was known for his "unambiguous racism."

== Early years ==
Parker was born in Lead, South Dakota, and raised in Deadwood. His grandfather William H. Parker (1847–1908), was an American Civil War Union Army veteran who later served in Congress. The Parker family migrated to Los Angeles, California, in 1922, for better opportunities, when the city was advertised as the "white spot of America" during that period. Parker originally wanted to be an attorney, and studied at several colleges before enrolling in 1926 at the University of the West's Los Angeles College of Law, an institution which operated in the 1920s and 30s. He joined the LAPD on August 8, 1927, and continued his legal studies. Parker graduated with an LL.B. degree in 1930 and passed the bar exam, but opted to continue with the police department instead of practicing law.

During Parker's early years in the department, he was an active advocate for the police and firefighters' union, working to create job security and better wages for members of the police and fire departments. He served as an LAPD officer for 15 years before taking leave to fight in World War II. He attained the rank of US Army captain as a planner and organizer of prisoner detention and policing in Sardinia, Normandy, Munich, and Frankfurt. Parker received the Purple Heart for wounds he received when a column he was in was strafed five days after the Normandy invasion. Shortly after the war, the French government awarded him the Croix de Guerre with silver star for his service in the war maintaining order after the liberation of Paris. After the war, Parker returned to the police department and rose through the ranks to captain, then inspector, and then one of the department's deputy chiefs.

== Police chief ==
Parker became police chief on August 9, 1950. The department that he took over in 1950 was notoriously corrupt. Seeing ward politics, with its heavy involvement by partisan groups in the police department and mingling of political circles with vice and corruption on the streets, led him to conclude that a differently-organized police force was necessary to keep the peace.

Early in Parker's tenure, the LAPD became a more professional institution more answerable to police administration than politicians. At the same time, Parker's reforms gave the chief autonomy that was unprecedented compared to the police chiefs of other major cities and which obstructed reforms attempted by Los Angeles mayors later in his career. Included in his changes were a standardized police academy and more proactive policing methods, practices very similar to military peacekeeping methods to which he was exposed during the war.

Although Parker had a low opinion of Hollywood and how it portrayed American law enforcement, he saw it as an effective tool (particularly the new medium of television) to promote his view of law enforcement's role, in general as well as in Los Angeles, in maintaining order and "civilized behavior". He first helped produce a panel show related to the LAPD called The Thin Blue Line, a reference to a phrase utilized by law enforcement agencies to refer to the police as the line between civil society and criminality. Parker is sometimes credited for coining the phrase, but others contest that. In addition to helping produce the show, Parker was a frequent panel member. Much more influential was his support for the radio and then television program Dragnet developed by Jack Webb. Unlike virtually all previous crime dramas, Dragnet attempted to show realistic police procedures. Parker gave Webb access to police files and allowed him to observe the LAPD in action even to the point of recording the sounds of police cars rapidly leaving the garage. While accuracy was a major goal of Dragnet, Webb was a strong advocate of the LAPD and stayed away from any story that showed any measure of police incompetence or corruption. Parker was also a guest on the television program What's My Line? on August 21, 1955.

Parker reduced the size of the police force, changing what had been a walking peace-force to a more militarized mobile response force. Parker's experience with the numerically larger force of his early career led him to judge that fewer but more professional officers would mean less corruption. Additionally, the strategy of changing the beat posture to one of mobility led to change from foot patrols to one which favored police cars. Not incidentally, this also furthered Parker's belief that isolating his officers from the streets would reduce opportunities for corruption. However, Parker recognized that certain areas of the city and certain functions of the police department needed to remain rooted in the more traditional form of police work.

Although Parker reduced police corruption and cleaned up the overall image of the police, certain sections of the LAPD continued practices similar to the old, semi-corrupt control of vice and petty crime. The vice squad and reserve force continued to remain controversial elements of the police force. Parker used elements of the reserve force such as the Organized Crime and Intelligence Division of the LAPD to keep tabs on politicians and their suspected mafia syndicate allies, as well as the notoriously corrupt and narcotic-ridden Hollywood movie industry and its celebrities. The 1990 novel and 1997 film L.A. Confidential, along with the 2013 film Gangster Squad, provide fictional depictions of the LAPD under Parker during these years.

In a statement which he made to the Permanent Subcommittee On Investigations Of The Senate Government Operations Committee in September 1963, U.S. Attorney General Robert Kennedy described the LAPD under Parker, together with the Cincinnati Police Department and New York Police Department, as being one of three police department in the United States which were "outstanding" in their fight against organized crime. The "FBI File on Robert Kennedy" also revealed how the Kennedy administration was even at one point seriously thinking about making Parker J. Edgar Hoover's replacement as FBI director.

However, under Parker, the LAPD also faced accusations of police brutality and racism towards the city's African American and Latino residents. According to a documentary commissioned by the LAPD in 2009, Parker supported the city's power structure, which he denied was racist as late as the 1960s. Some critics see Parker's policies as responsible for ongoing tensions between the LAPD and minorities. Although Parker testified to the Civil Rights Commission in 1959 that segregation was not a problem, in 1962, he ordered the desegregation of the LAPD. When asked by the Commission about discrimination against minorities, he replied "I think the greatest dislocated minority in America today are the police."

Parker was also known to publicly make callous and racist remarks towards minorities, African-Americans especially, and he largely refused to hire black police officers. During most of his tenure, those already on the force were prohibited from having white partners. Media reports also referred to numerous instances of white supremacist violence that went unresolved during Parker's tenure.

Parker's controversial practices towards minorities have been cited as the cause of the Watts riots on August 11, 1965. For five days, businesses and stores were burned or looted, civilians were killed or wounded while being caught in the crossfire, and sniping was frequent, before the rioters dispersed from committing more violence after the California Army National Guard took to the streets in supplementing the LAPD officers. At the end, 34 people were killed in the riots, 21 of them by police or National Guard bullets. About 1,032 were injured, 3,438 were arrested, and over $40 million in property damage were caused. In spite of this, this was not enough to derail Parker's career, as he continued to serve as LAPD police chief for another year until his death. In a phone conversation with U.S. President Lyndon Johnson, Martin Luther King Jr.. described Parker as a "very rude man" who, along with mayor Sam Yorty-who King did not attack in same manner as he did Parker-, was unwilling to offer concessions. However, King also cast blame on the presence of the local National Guard in Watts for greatly aiding Parker's "anti-riot crew" agenda. In the phone conversation, Johnson, who publicly advocated for people to obey the law, was also revealed to have been more sympathetic towards people involved in the rioting, stating to King "there's no use giving lectures on the law as long as you got rats eating on people's kid - children and unemployed, and no roof over their head, and no job to go to, and maybe with a dope needle on one side and a cancer on the other."

In a 1992 article in the Los Angeles Times, journalist David Shaw wrote:

"When Parker referred to black participants in the Watts riots as behaving like 'monkeys in a zoo,' a Times story later charitably characterized this as an 'obviously unintentional but unfortunate remark.' During the riots, Parker also said, on television: 'It is estimated that by 1970, 45% of the metropolitan area of Los Angeles will be Negro. ... If you want any protection for your home and family ... you're going to have to get in and support a strong Police Department. If you don't, come 1970, God help you.' Earlier in his tenure, Parker attributed criminal activity among Latinos to their 'not being too far removed from the wild tribes of ... the inner mountains of Mexico.'"

Despite the two of them being considered to be "alike," Parker in fact had a very hostile relationship with FBI Director J. Edgar Hoover throughout his time as the LAPD police chief. This hostility between Parker and Hoover greatly stemmed from Parker's view that the LAPD was an autonomous institution which should be independent of FBI assistance and interference. The feud between Parker and Hoover would also create great tension between the LAPD and the FBI which continued for decades following Parker's death, with tensions only reporting as starting to mend in 1994.

Stuart Schrader writes of Parker in a 2019 study that he "was a stern, serious, moralistic man, whose hobbyhorse was standardization. Parkerism was proceduralism. The police procedural crime drama, a staple of US television, was a Parker creation. With de facto oversight of the 1950s television series Dragnet, Parker disseminated his vision of professionalized policing across the United States."

According to Edward J. Escobar, Parker's view of the world saw civilized society as one camp whereas the other camp was "the forces of chaos and iniquity." Escobar writes that the latter included "not only organized crime but also racial minority groups, dissidents, especially communists, and anyone who supported these groups, which for Parker meant anyone who criticized the police."

== Death ==
Parker died of a heart attack on July 16, 1966, after attending a dinner where he received a commendation. The honor to him was held by the Second Marine Division Association at the Statler Hilton Hotel in Los Angeles. Completed under Parker's tenure in 1955, the former Police Administration Building on Los Angeles Street was renamed Parker Center shortly after his death, and served as LAPD's headquarters until the new HQ was completed in 2009. Although it was demolished in 2019, Parker Center lives on in popular media, with frequent appearances and mentions in the television series Dragnet, Perry Mason, Columbo and Cannon along with the films Blue Thunder and Inherent Vice.

== In popular culture ==
- Star Trek creator Gene Roddenberry, a former LAPD officer, wrote speeches for Parker. Roddenberry is said to have modeled the character Mr. Spock after Parker.
- Bruce Dern portrayed Parker in the 1996 movie Mulholland Falls.
- Nick Nolte portrayed Parker in the 2013 movie Gangster Squad.
- Neal McDonough portrayed Parker at the rank of captain in the 2013 television miniseries Mob City.
- Parker was portrayed in James Ellroy's 1990 novel L.A. Confidential and by John Mahon (credited only as "The Chief") in Curtis Hanson's 1997 film adaptation.
  - In Ellroy's 2014 novel Perfidia, a fictionalized version of Parker is one of the four main protagonists.
  - In the 2019 sequel This Storm, Parker again appears as a major character whom the main protagonists regularly interact with.
  - Parker is a minor antagonist in Ellroy's 2023 novel The Enchanters, where he works to protect the LAPD's image in the wake of the Death of Marilyn Monroe.
- Parker's and contemporary gangster Mickey Cohen's biographies are represented in John Buntin's non-fiction tome L.A. Noir: The Struggle for the Soul of America's Most Seductive City (2010)
- Parker appears via archival footage in the critically acclaimed documentary O.J.: Made in America, specifically in the narrative concerning the Watts riots and the racial tensions between the LAPD and the African-American community.

== See also ==
- Billy G. Mills (born 1929), Los Angeles City Council member, 1963–1974, investigating the Watts riots

Police appointments
Preceded by William A. Worton	Chief of LAPD; 1950–1966	Succeeded by Thad F. Brown
