= This Storm (novel) =

2019 historical and crime fiction novel

- U. S. first edition cover
- Author: James Ellroy
- Cover artist: Jacket design by Chip Kidd, Glenn O'Neill (U. K. Edition)
- Language: English
- Series: The Second L.A. Quartet
- Genre: Crime fiction, noir, historical fiction, historical romance
- Publisher: Alfred A. Knopf, William Heinemann Ltd/Cornerstone
- Publication date: May 30, 2019 (United Kingdom), June 4, 2019 (United States)
- Publication place: United States
- Media type: Print (hardback and paperback), audio CD, audio download, Kindle, audiobook, and paperback Large Print (June 18, 2019)
- Pages: 608 pp (first edition, hardcover)
- ISBN: 978-0-307-95700-9 (U.S. first edition, hardcover), ISBN 978-0-434-02058-4 (United Kingdom edition, hardcover), ISBN 9780525521730 (ebook), ISBN 9781524711511 (open market)
- OCLC: 1103324432
- Dewey Decimal: 813'/.54—dc23
- LC Class: PS3555.L6274 T47 2019
- Preceded by: Perfidia

This Storm: A Novel is a 2019 historical fiction and crime fiction by American author James Ellroy. It is the second novel in Ellroy's "Second L.A. Quartet", in reference to the first "L.A. Quartet", and following the novel Perfidia. Ellroy dedicated the novel "To HELEN KNODE." The epigraph is "Blood alone moves the wheels of history. -Benito "Il Duce" Mussolini". It was released May 30, 2019, in the United Kingdom, and June 4, 2019 in the United States.

== Plot ==
This Storm is set in Los Angeles and Mexico, starting with Kay Lake's remembrance of her past, and a bootleg radio transmission in Tijuana, Mexico by Father Charles Coughlin on December 30, 1941. Set after the events of Perfidia, the story follows the murder of two LAPD officers, an investigation into a gold heist, and an act of murderous arson. It follows the real life Elmer Jackson, as well as Dudley Smith, Joan Conville, and Hideo Ashida. Later, Kay Lake's diary entries are followed. Like Perfidia, Ellroy provided a dramatis personæ.

== Reception ==
It was on the Los Angeles Times Best Seller List on June 23, 2019 for Hardcover Fiction at number 4 for two weeks. It has been reviewed by Marilyn Stasio of The New York Times, who said that Ellroy is "back, and his Los Angeles is darker than ever". The Guardian's review read: "It's been five years since the last novel from the self-described 'Demon Dog' of American letters, but it’s worth the wait. Like all good jazzmen, Ellroy works very hard indeed to make his music flow so easily."

== See also ==
- 1933 Griffith Park Fire
- Fifth column
- Battle of Los Angeles
- Salvador Abascal
