= Fletcher Bowron =

American politician (1887–1968)

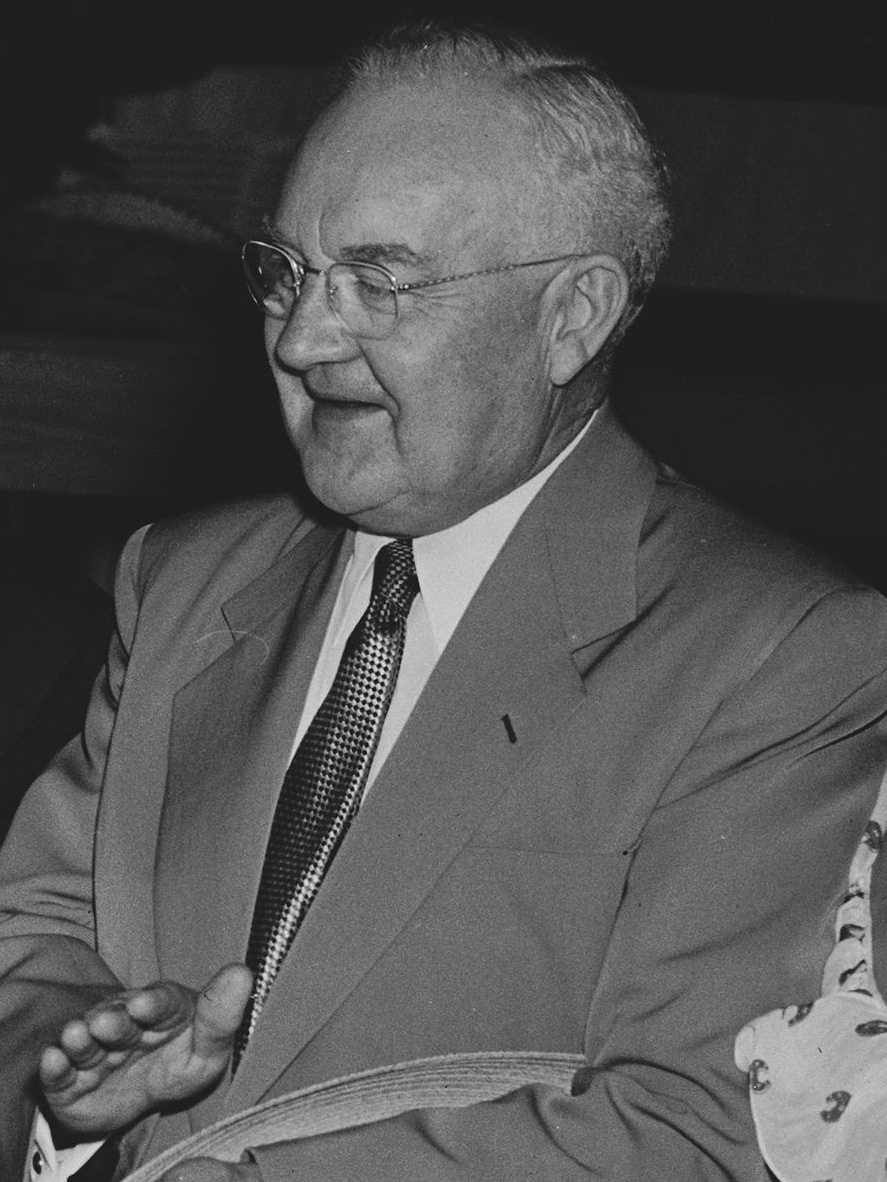
- Mayor Bowron at a Cinco de Mayo celebration, 1952

35th Mayor of Los Angeles
- In office September 26, 1938 – July 1, 1953
- Preceded by: Frank L. Shaw
- Succeeded by: Norris Poulson

20th President of the National League of Cities
- In office 1948
- Preceded by: Woodall Rodgers
- Succeeded by: deLesseps Story Morrison

Judge of the Los Angeles County Superior Court
- In office 1956–1962
- Preceded by: Joseph L. Call
- In office 1926–1938

Personal details
- Born: August 13, 1887 Poway, California, U.S.
- Died: September 11, 1968 (aged 81) Los Angeles, California, U.S.
- Resting place: Inglewood Park Cemetery
- Party: Republican
- Spouses: Irene Martin (m. 1922; died 1961) Albine Norton (m. 1961)
- Children: 1

Military service
- Allegiance: United States
- Branch/service: United States Army
- Years of service: 1917-1919
- Unit: 14th Field Artillery; Military Intelligence
- Battles/wars: World War I

Fletcher Bowron (August 13, 1887 – September 11, 1968) was an American lawyer, judge, and politician. He was the 35th Mayor of Los Angeles from 1938 to 1953. As a member of the Republican Party, Bowron’s 15 years of service was the city's longest-serving mayor at the time and the second longest-serving mayor overall after Tom Bradley. He presided over the post-war boom, significant population growth, and the construction of freeways to accommodate the increased traffic.

== Life and career ==
Bowron was born in Poway, California, the youngest of three children. His Yankee parents, who had migrated from the Midwest, sent him to Los Angeles High School, where he graduated in 1904. In 1907, he began studies at UC Berkeley, where his two brothers had graduated, then enrolled in the University of Southern California Law School two years later where he became a member of the Delta Chi fraternity. He dropped out of law school and became a reporter for San Francisco, Oakland and Los Angeles newspapers, working the City Hall and court beats in the latter city. He was finally admitted to the bar in 1917.

Upon the U.S. entry into World War I in 1917, Bowron enlisted in the Army, serving in the 14th Field Artillery before transferring to the military intelligence division. Upon his return, he once again practiced law before he married Irene Martin in 1922. The following year, he was appointed as a deputy state corporations commissioner. His work in that capacity caught the attention of California governor, Friend Richardson, who hired him as executive secretary in 1925, and then appointed him to the superior court in 1926.

In his first tenure as a superior court judge, which lasted 12 years, Bowron became the first jurist on the West Coast to use the pre-trial calendar system.

Judge and Mrs. Bowron adopted an orphaned baby in July 1934.

=== Mayor ===
He was then elected mayor of Los Angeles on a fusion ticket in 1938 in the wake of the corruption arising from the previous administration of Frank L. Shaw, and earned the reputation of being lawful, unlike his predecessor. This was part of what he called the Los Angeles Urban Reform Revival.

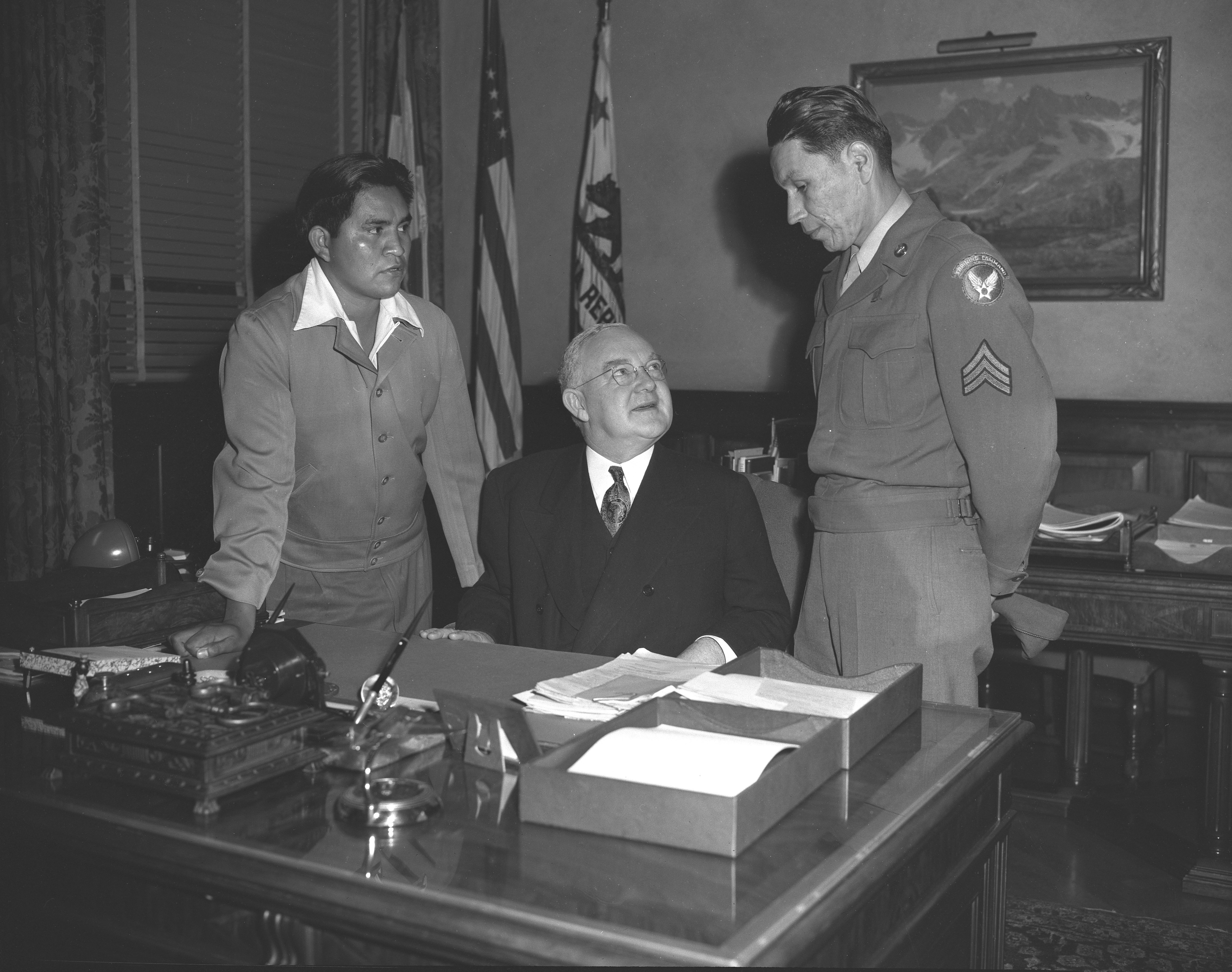
Published 1947 caption: "Ira Hayes, left, a Pima Indian survivor of the Mt. Suribachi Flag-raising, and Sgt. Henry Reed, Indian veteran of Bataan Death March, call on Mayor Bowron. They are here on a trip to protest court rulings discriminating against their race in housing."

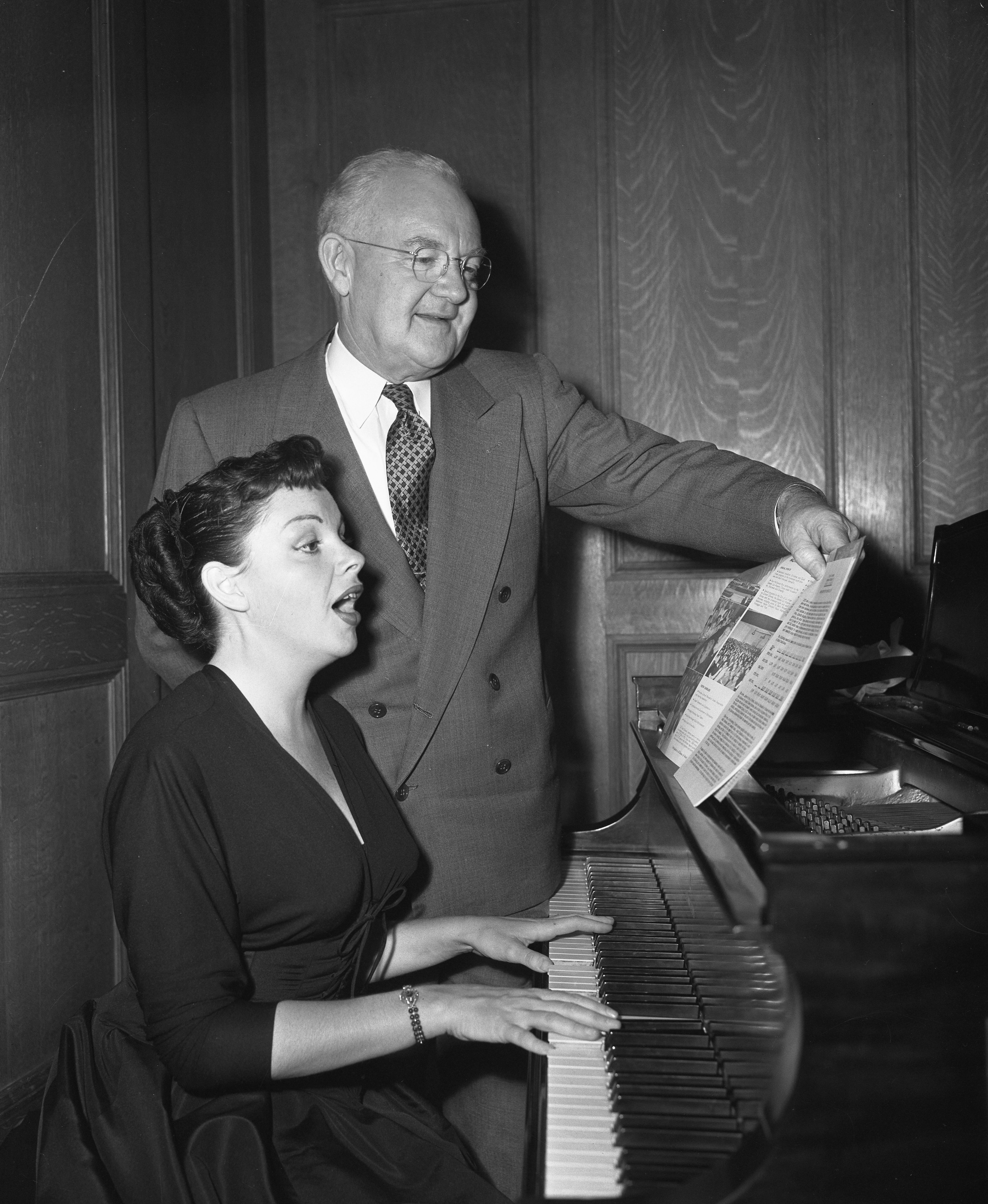
With Judy Garland at piano. Proclamation of Music Week, 1952

Los Angeles grew enormously during the war years, with very large defense industries. After the war Bowron began construction of the Los Angeles International Airport and the 1st phases of the elaborate freeway system. He obtained hundred million dollars from the Federal Housing Authority for the construction of 10,000 units. As president of the American Municipal Association, representing 9500 cities, he was the leader of the nation's mayors in their dealings with the federal government. A high priority was eliminating organized crime from the city's police department. He forced the resignation of numerous officers, and prevented Los Angeles from becoming a wide open town. Bowron ran on nonpartisan fusion tickets, but his popularity declined in his 4th term. The Los Angeles Citizens Committee demanded his recall, claiming he was responsible for high taxes and continued police corruption. In 1952 he lost his reelection bid in the Republican primary to Norris Poulson, a conservative opponent of public housing.

He served during the era of World War II, most notably supporting the removal of Japanese Americans from California and their subsequent Internment. In January 1942 Bowron began to call for relocating Japanese Americans away from the coast and putting them to work in farm camps. He forced all Japanese American employees of the City of Los Angeles to take a leave of absence and circulated propaganda targeted at people of Japanese descent. By February he was pushing for internment on his radio show, quoted on Abraham Lincoln's birthday in support of the camps: "There isn't a shadow of a doubt but that Lincoln, the mild-mannered man whose memory we regard with almost saint-like reverence, would make short work of rounding up the Japanese and putting them where they could do no harm." He continued by talking about "the people born on American soil who have secret loyalty to the Japanese Emperor." Bowron also attempted to pass a constitutional amendment under which American-born Japanese would be stripped of their citizen rights if they held dual U.S.-Japanese citizenship or if their parents were ineligible for U.S. citizenship. He additionally proposed allowing the government to ignore portions of the Selective Service Act and call Japanese Americans, including women and those whose age or physical status would otherwise exempt them, into non-combat military service if the war required it.

In 1948, Bowron served as president of the National League of Cities.

== Later life ==
He lost re-election in 1953 after having survived a number of recall attempts, with his defeat attributed partly to the loss of his liberal backing as a result of McCarthyism. In 1956, he once again ran for superior court judge, defeating Joseph L. Call in the November election. Serving one six-year term, he retired in 1962, but remained active in city activities.

On January 4, 1961, his wife Irene died at the Madison Lodge Sanitarium after spending nearly five years at the facility. Ten months later, Bowron married his long-time executive assistant, Albine Norton.

Following his retirement from the bench, he served as director of the Metropolitan Los Angeles History Project, hiring Robert C. Post, then a graduate student at UCLA, as his chief researcher. In 1967, Bowron was named chairman of the city's Citizen's Committee on Zoning Practices and Procedures.

=== Death and burial ===
After finishing work on September 11, 1968, he suffered a fatal heart attack while driving home. While his body lay in state in the Los Angeles City Hall rotunda, people came to pay their respects. He is buried at Inglewood Park Cemetery.

== Personal ==
The Bowrons were members of the Jonathan Club.

== Other ==
Bowron urged the defeat of these opposition City Council candidates in 1939, a so-called "purge list":

- Byron B. Brainard
- Howard W. Davis
- Earl C. Gay
- James M. Hyde
- Edward L. Thrasher

== In popular culture ==
- Bowron appeared in the 1953 "Tax Refund" episode of The George Burns and Gracie Allen Show.
- Bowron was endorsed and campaigned for his reelection by gangster Mickey Cohen, including a picture of Cohen's infamous armored Cadillac with Bowron campaign signs, Mickey Cohen standing next to it.
- In the 2011 video game L.A. Noire, the mayor is based on Fletcher Bowron, and shares the same name and personality. He is portrayed by J. Patrick McCormack.
- In James Ellroy's 2014 novel Perfidia, Ellroy provides a fictionalized version of Fletcher Bowron in a supporting role. This version of Bowron also appears in Perfidia's sequel This Storm.

== See also ==
- Employers Group, which, as the Merchants and Manufacturers Association, opposed Bowron's policies
- Stephen W. Cunningham, Republican City Council member who ran against Bowron in 1941
- Harold Harby, Los Angeles City Council member, 1939–42, 1943–57, complained about Bowron's radio talks
- John C. Holland, Los Angeles City Council member, 1943–67, Bowron supporter
- LAPD Red Squad – Municipal secret police
