= Henry H. Lyon =

American politician

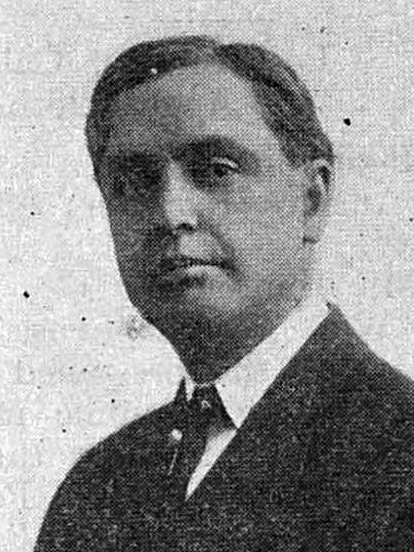
- Lyon in 1912

Member of the California Senate from the 29th district
- In office January 6, 1913 – November 1, 1917
- Preceded by: James B. Holohan
- Succeeded by: Dwight H. Hart

Member of the California State Assembly from the 73rd district
- In office January 2, 1911 – January 6, 1913
- Preceded by: Jacob P. Transue
- Succeeded by: Howard A. Peairs

Member of the Los Angeles City Council for the 7th ward
- In office December 13, 1906 – December 10, 1909
- Preceded by: Edward Kern
- Succeeded by: District abolished

Personal details
- Born: April 17, 1879 Los Angeles, California, U.S.
- Died: November 1, 1917 (aged 38) Los Angeles, California, U.S.
- Party: Republican
- Spouse: Sarah Agnes McGinley (m. 1899)

Henry Herbert Lyon (April 17, 1879 – November 1, 1917) was an American politician who served on the Los Angeles City Council and in both chambers of the California State Legislature before his death in 1917.

== Political career ==
In 1906, Lyon ran for Los Angeles City Council for the 7th ward after Edward Kern resigned to become the Chief of the Los Angeles Police Department. In 1909, the Los Angeles government was reorganized with the new charter, and the ward system was abolished. Lyon ran for re-election but lost as only the first nine were elected, with Richmond Plant beating him by 309 votes. The next year, he became a candidate for the California State Assembly for the 73rd district.

In 1912, he announced himself as a candidate for California State Senate for the 29th district, with Lyon expecting to poll by a large vote. He won the plurality of the vote against two other candidates. He won re-election in 1916 without any opposition; that same year, some of his supporters circulated a petition so that he could run for Mayor of Los Angeles. On April 26, 1917, Lyon announced that he would be running for Los Angeles City Council for the at-large district, placing eleventh and losing the election.

== Murder ==
On October 9, 1917, Lyon and his wife were leaving their home when he was shot twice, with Lyon being rushed to the hospital and naming the shooter as Marie Pinzon Edwards. Although expected to survive and recover, Lyon died from the bullet would on November 1, 1917. Edwards was held responsible for his death by a coroner's inquiry but was ultimately not convicted following a hung jury the following year.
