= William Hammell =

William Hammell may refer to:

- William Henry Hammell (1845–1937), Canadian politician
- William James Hammell (1881–1959), Canadian politician
- William A. Hammell, Chief of the Los Angeles Police Department (1904–1905)
