= Alexander W. Murray =

LAPD Acting Chief of Police, 1920

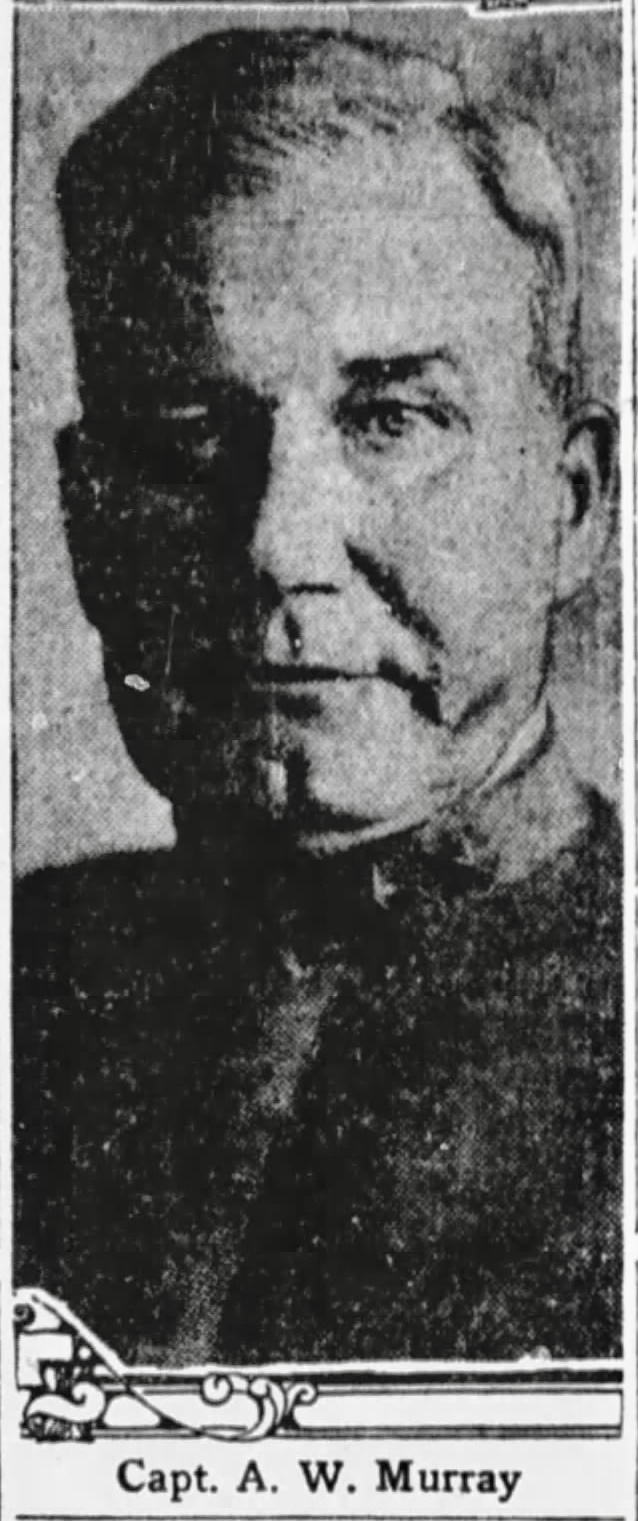
- Born: July 3, 1864; St. Paul, Minnesota, U.S.
- Died: May 30, 1927; Near Seminole Hot Springs, California, U.S.
- Police career
- Country: United States
- Department: Los Angeles Police Department
- Rank: Acting Chief of Police - 1920

Alexander W. Murray (July 3, 1864 – May 30, 1927) served in the LAPD for 30 years, the latter of half of which was in various positions of department leadership, including captain, police inspector, and on multiple occasions, acting chief of police.

He was officially acting chief of police of the Los Angeles Police Department for one month, in October 1920, and seems to have held the position of acting chief unofficially multiple times during the many years of chief churn experienced by the department in the early 20th century. According to the Los Angeles Times, "Murray has the distinction of having served more years as Chief of Police during emergencies than any one man actually in the position as Chief".

He was described as an "ideal officer, both as to appearance and conduct", and was remembered for a "quiet, dignified, philosophical manner that...distinguished his actions as an active police executive".

== Biography ==
A. W. Murray was born at St. Paul, Minnesota on July 3, 1864. Before becoming a police officer he worked as an undertaker. He was appointed a patrolman on June 30, 1897. Murray was married in Los Angeles in 1904, and made sergeant on November 7, 1905. He was promoted to police lieutenant on November 13, 1906. In 1911 Murray was made a police captain, heading the new station in Boyle Heights, at which time he was described as "one of the most capable officers in the department".

His 48th birthday was celebrated at a police barbecue at Glassell's ranch near Eagle Rock, where he was toasted by Colonel Emil Bloch and others. He ultimately worked as the commander of central station for most of the 1910s.

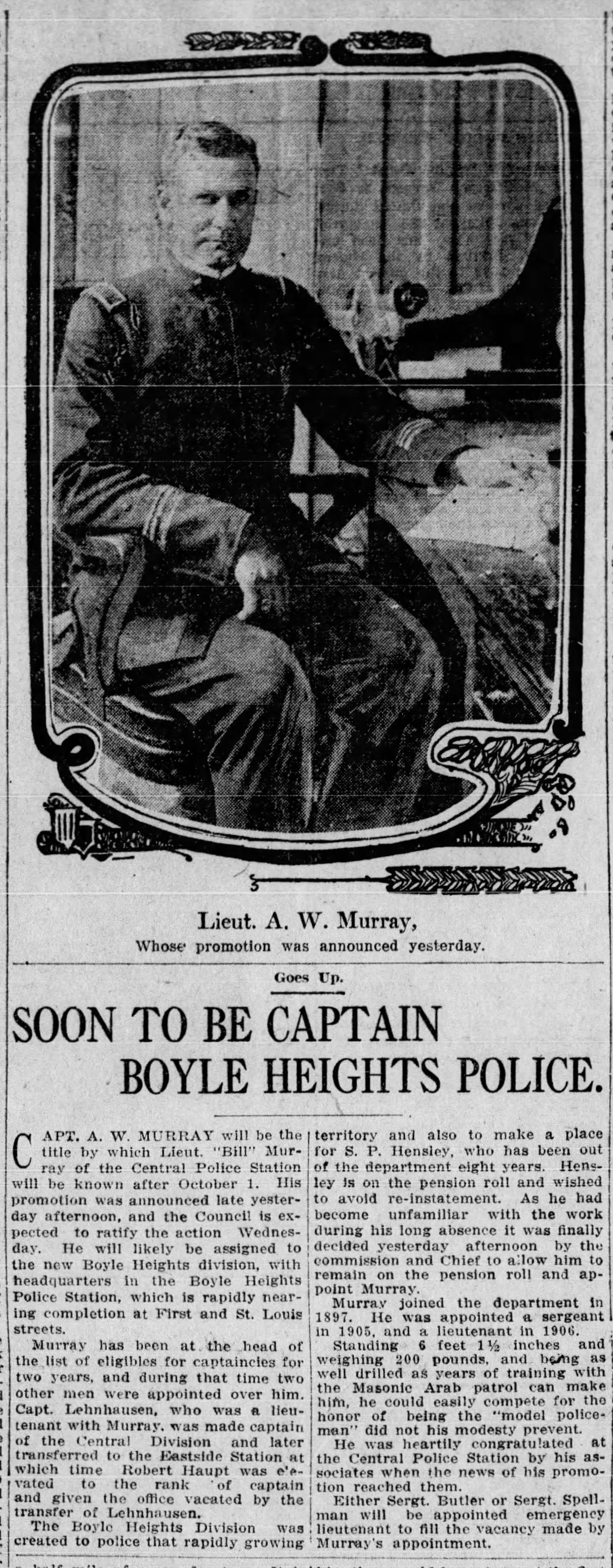
Los Angeles Times, Sept. 22, 1911

Murray possibly was in the position of acting chief earlier than October 1920 as he is titled "acting chief of police" in a photo caption dated August 1920. He officially filled in between George K. Home and the commission hiring Lyle Pendegast, and Pendegast appointed Murray inspector of police once he was in office. One headline read "New Police Head Will Route Details to Inspector."

In 1921, Chief Jones swapped out Murray and R. Lee Heath between commands of the central and University divisions, the Los Angeles Record wrote, "The transfer of Murray created a sensation and much gossip today. For the past five years, Murray has commanded Central division under numerous chiefs of police and his integrity has never been questioned. He has been considered by hundreds as the bulwark of the efficient branch of the police department and is held in the highest regard by Los Angeles' most prominent citizens, businessmen, and merchants. In an interview with reporters, Inspector Murray had little to say this morning. 'Orders are orders,' he said, 'and I will treat them as such.' Murray was surprised when told of the coming transfer but he did not show any resentment or misgiving."

By January 1922, Murray was again titled acting chief and announced to the public a major departmental reorganization.

During the period from September 1922, to January 1924, he retired because of ill health. Per the Los Angeles Times, "He retired once but returned to put in many more years of active service in executive positions." Murray was appointed assistant chief in 1925 by R. Lee Heath, and Murray filled in again as acting chief in 1925 while Heath was on a trip back east.

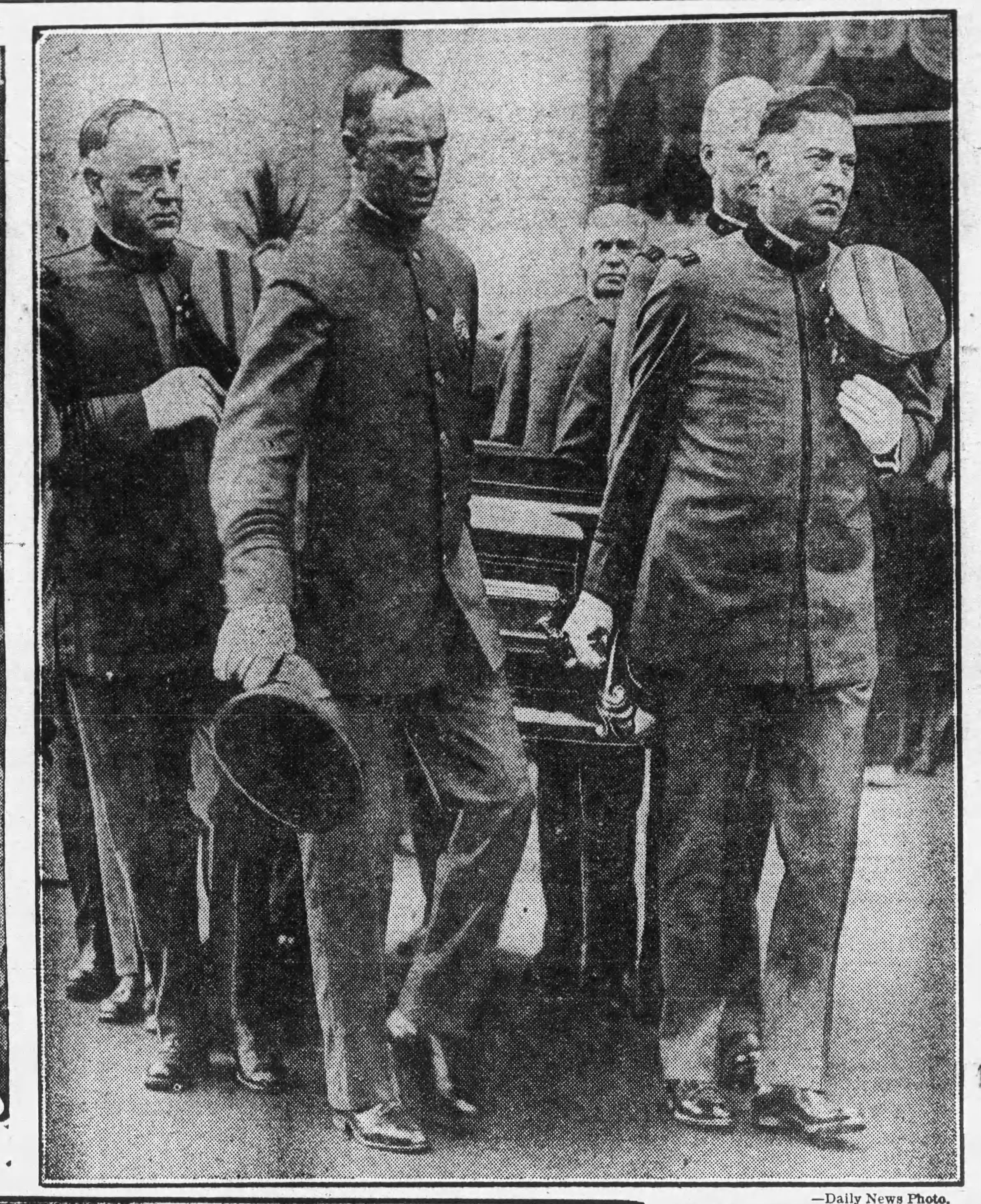
"Homage to Remains of Capt. Murray" Los Angeles Daily News, June 3, 1927

In late life, Murray moved out to a cabin in the Topanga–Agoura area near Seminole Hot Springs, which meant a 50-mile commute downtown to work. When he died in May 1927 after a long bout with anemia, the Los Angeles Record stated, "Chief Murray was one of the most popular officers on the department." His funeral at the Hollywood Mausoleum was attended by 5,000 people.

== See also ==
- Chief of the Los Angeles Police Department § List of police chiefs

Police appointments
| Preceded by George K. Home | Chief of LAPD; 1920 | Succeeded by Lyle Pendegast |
