= Everington =

Everington is a surname. Notable people with the surname include:

- Harry Everington (1929–2000), British sculptor
- James W. Everington (fl. 1920s), American police chief
- Sam Everington (fl. 1976), British physician

== Fictional place ==
- Billy Elliot#Plot
