= Auble =

Auble is a surname, and an Americanized variant of Aubel. Notable people with the surname include:

- David Auble (born 1938), American wrestler
- Walter H. Auble (1862–1908), American police chief
