= George E. Gard =

Los Angeles police chief, 1880–1881

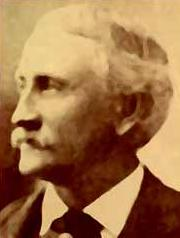
- Born: George Edwin Gard; January 16, 1843; Lebanon, Ohio
- Died: March 10, 1904 (aged 61)
- Relatives: Buddy DeSylva (grandson)
- Police career
- Department: Los Angeles Police Department; Los Angeles County Sheriff's Department
- Service years: 1880–1881, 1884–1886

George Edwin Gard (January 16, 1843 – March 10, 1904) was an American law enforcement official who served as both Chief of Police of Los Angeles and Sheriff of Los Angeles County. He was the fourth Chief of Police of Los Angeles (1880–1881), succeeding Henry King, and the 16th Sheriff of Los Angeles County (1884–1886), succeeding Alvan T. Currier. Gard is one of only three people to have held both positions, the others being William A. Hammel and Jim McDonnell.

== Early life and Civil War service ==
Gard was born in Lebanon, Ohio, to Dr. William V. H. Gard and Lucretia Williamson. After losing his mother at age three and father at age six, Gard was raised by his grandfather, Garret Williamson, in Hamilton, Ohio.

In 1859, at age 16, Gard traveled overland to California with his uncle Henry Williamson, who brought thoroughbred horses and cattle. Gard lived in San Jose before moving to Mariposa County, where he worked in mining and later supervised local sawmills. In 1864, Gard enlisted as First Sergeant in Company H of the Seventh California Volunteer Infantry, serving in Arizona and New Mexico until March 1866.

== Career in Los Angeles ==
After military service, Gard settled briefly in Wilmington before moving to Los Angeles. There, he established the Los Angeles Ice Company, the first ice business in Southern California. Gard married Kate A. Hammel in 1869; their daughter Georgetta Miles was the mother of famed songwriter Buddy DeSylva.

Gard served as deputy county clerk (1871), Los Angeles police detective (1871–1874), deputy county recorder (1874), and chief county recorder (1875–1879). In December 1880, he was appointed Chief of Police of Los Angeles, serving one year and organizing the city's first traffic control squad.

In 1884, Gard was elected Sheriff of Los Angeles County on the Republican ticket, serving until 1886.

== Real estate development ==
In 1886, Gard purchased land in Gladstone, followed in 1887 by a larger tract in nearby Alosta during the Southern California real estate boom of the 1880s. He formed the Alosta Land and Water Company, significantly investing in water infrastructure and promoting settlement. Gard actively developed horticultural ventures, establishing extensive citrus and deciduous orchards, and contributed to the early growth of Alosta, which in 1911 became part of the city of Glendora.

== Later life and affiliations ==
Gard remained active in politics, notably within the Republican Party and the Grand Army of the Republic (GAR). He served on the GAR national council in 1888 and became commander of the Department of California in 1889. Gard was also a member of Olive Lodge No. 26 of the Knights of Pythias and Los Angeles Lodge No. 55 of the Ancient Order of United Workmen.

He died on March 10, 1904.

== See also ==
- List of Los Angeles Police Department Chiefs of Police
- List of Los Angeles County sheriffs

Police appointments
Preceded by Henry King	Chief of LAPD; 1880–1881	Succeeded by Henry King
Preceded by Alvan T. Currier	Los Angeles County Sheriff; 1884–1886	Succeeded by James C. Kays
