= Zui =

Zui or ZUI may refer to:

Places

- Friulian name of Zuglio, in Udine province, Friuli-Venezia Giulia, Italy
- Zui, a chiefdom of Hispaniola

Acronyms

- Zooming user interface

Other

- Zui, a 2001 album by Showtaro Morikubo
- KidZui, a web browser designed for children
- ZUI, military and amateur radio short hand for "I wish to draw your attention to ..."
