= KidZui =

Web browser designed for children

KidZui, The Internet For Kids
- Founded: San Diego, California, US (September 1, 2006) as KidZui, Inc.
- Founder: Cliff Boro, Thomas Broadhead, Vidar Vignisson
- Headquarters: 2448 Historic Decatur Rd. Suite 105, San Diego, California, US
- Website: KidZui at the Wayback Machine (archived May 13, 2014)

KidZui was a web browser designed for children developed by KidZui, Inc. The KidZui browser used a Zooming User Interface paradigm to make browsing easier for children. Search results appeared as scaled-down images of websites, videos, and pictures that children click on to zoom in and see the content. Children can also browse by category without typing search terms. The KidZui browser did not access the open Internet. KidZui uses teachers and parents to screen content and maintains a database of approved URLs. The KidZui browser could only access URLs in the approved database. Children built avatars called Zuis to represent themselves online. They earned points for web browsing and used points to gain levels and buy clothes and accessories for their Zuis. Children could share KidZui content with friends online. To add a friend online, children needed to know the friends Zui name. There was no online directory of Zui names, so children needed to get their friends Zui names offline in order to add them. Friends also needed to be approved by parents before they become available in the browser. KidZui also tracked children's Internet usage and sends reports to their parents on what their children looked at online.

KidZui began development on the product in the summer of 2006. After beta testing, KidZui was offered to the general public on March 19, 2008. The KidZui browser and basic reports for parents are free. KidZui makes revenue through a paid membership program. Membership gives kids additional features like more available clothing and accessories for Zuis, more background and themes, and the ability to get to higher levels with points. Membership gives parents more reporting capabilities to track their children's online activity, and more ways to customize the KidZui browser for their children.

KidZui was designed for children between the ages of 3 and 12 years old. KidZui had a focus on children's online safety, but they also tried to expand the content available to children online. Rather than solely using filters, KidZui trained and enlisted parents and teachers to search out content that is appropriate for children even if it was not designed expressly for children. Websites that had been reviewed and approved by KidZui could carry a KidZui seal of approval that indicates the site's content is appropriate for children. Websites that carried the seal agree to abide by KidZui's content guidelines. KidZui was also a prize on the 3rd round on the Nickelodeon game show BrainSurge.

In August 2014, LeapFrog purchased KidZui. The KidZui terms of the deal were not disclosed.

== History and development ==
KidZui was started in 2006 when Vidar Vignisson was frustrated because he couldn't find a safe and easy way for his own children to use the Internet. Vignisson joined with Cliff Boro and Thomas Broadhead to create KidZui. Prior to founding KidZui, Vignisson, Boro, and Broadhead had been partners on other Internet startups including Infogate, which they sold to AOL Time Warner in March 2003.

Vignisson was frustrated by the approach of existing technologies that were available at the time; online filters helped keep out dangerous content, but could only be used in conjunction with adult browsers, which are hard for children to use. Existing children's browsers were easier to use but had access to very small amounts of content. Vignisson, Boro, and Broadhead set out to build an easy-to-use children's browser with access to a large and diverse set of online content and activities.

KidZui is a venture backed startup. Investors include Maveron, Emergence Capital, and First Round Capital.

Prior to founding KidZui, Vignisson, Boro, and Broadhead had been partners on other Internet startups including Infogate, which they sold to AOL Time Warner (later Time Warner, now WarnerMedia) in March 2003.

KidZui began beta testing with children in 2006. KidZui was released to the general public on March 19, 2008 to generally favorable reviews. The original release of KidZui required a paid subscription. KidZui experienced some early criticism for not offering a free version of the product. The company released a free version on June 4, 2008. The free version of the product offers the same features as the original subscription-based product. KidZui introduced a membership program that same month. The membership program unlocks additional features in the kids’ browser and comes with more advanced reporting features for parents.

== ZuiTube ==
ZuiTube was the online video destination that used KidZui's catalogue of kid-friendly video content. ZuiTube used a user interface designed for children. ZuiTube provided a "Play All" mode that allowed kids to watch all videos within a specific channel without interruption, as well as an "auto complete" search feature with smart-type that optimized results based on popularity, or "Kid Rank." ZuiTube also offered KidZui-user-generated video channels as an opportunity for kids to both enjoy and express themselves within KidZui's community of users.

ZuiTube.com launched in August 2009. The website launch was followed by the release of the ZuiTube App for iPhone and iPod Touch. As of July 2016, the domain name is no longer registered and the app has been pulled from the iOS app store.

== Business model ==
The basic version of KidZui with access to all content was free. Revenue came exclusively from paid memberships. It is not clear what percentage of families used the free version versus paying for membership. KidZui included advertisements to children in their browser, mostly based on sponsored partnerships with Under Armour, Mattel, and Comcast.

== Content guidelines ==
KidZui used filters to pre-screen content. After screening by filters, the content was reviewed by paid teachers and parents using a set of content guidelines.

In 2007, KidZui hired Deanne Kells, a former vice president and Editor in Chief from LeapFrog, to establish the content guidelines and a process for reviewing and approving content. Kells used childhood developmental principles to form a content screening protocol where content is first determined to be appropriate for children, and then classified by age for developmental level and reading ability.

== Browser features ==
KidZui used a Zooming User Interface paradigm where search results are displayed visually at a smaller scale. Children clicked on images to enlarge them. The visual interface made it easier for children to browse without advanced reading skills. KidZui also had category browsing that allowed children to explore the Internet using categories based on popularity or similarity. KidZui had an auto search complete feature that returns results after only typing one or two letters. KidZui offered to complete search terms using the most popular searches by other children and it showed search results as children type.

== See also ==
- ZuiTube
