= Willie L. Williams =

American police chief (1943–2016)

- Born: October 1, 1943; Philadelphia, Pennsylvania, U.S.
- Died: April 26, 2016 (aged 72); Atlanta, Georgia, U.S.
- Police career
- Country: United States
- Department: Philadelphia Police Department; Los Angeles Police Department
- Service years: 1967–1992; 1992–1997
- Rank: Sworn in as an Officer - 1967: Chief of Police - 1988, 1992
- Other work: Federal Security Director of Hartsfield Atlanta International Airport

Willie L. Williams (October 1, 1943 – April 26, 2016) was an American police officer who served as the chief of the Los Angeles Police Department (LAPD) from 1992 to 1997, taking over after chief Daryl Gates' resignation following the 1992 Los Angeles riots. Williams was the first African-American Commissioner of the Philadelphia Police Department and the first African-American Chief of the LAPD. During his term as Chief of the LAPD, he tried to create a positive image of the department and close the rift created between the police and black neighborhoods by the violent arrest of Rodney King in 1991.

== Philadelphia Police Chief (1988–1992) ==
In June 1988, Philadelphia Police Chief Kevin M. Tucker resigned from the Philadelphia Police Department to become a senior vice president at PNC Bank. Willie Williams, who was described as a protégé of Tucker, was chosen to succeed him. Upon taking office, Williams became the first African American police commissioner in Philadelphia history.

On July 31, 1990, Williams, as Philadelphia Police Commissioner, testified before the United States Senate Judiciary Committee, 101st Congress, 2nd Session on "The Increase of Homicides In Our Nation" also known as "Murder Rates: Why The Recent Rise?" In his testimony, Williams stated in part: "We must prevent the ready availability of handguns in America. It is for this reason, that I fully support the 'Brady' legislation which would require a seven-day waiting period when purchasing a handgun. Currently, there is a three-day waiting period to purchase a handgun in Philadelphia and a two-day waiting period across the rest of Pennsylvania.

"Furthermore, I support a total ban on the possession of handguns and semi-automatic weapons by members of the general public. Weapons such as these are not used as legitimate hunting weapons, unless we have lowered ourselves to prey upon human beings."

== Los Angeles Police Chief (1992–1997) ==
Williams was appointed as LAPD Chief by Los Angeles mayor Tom Bradley, succeeding Daryl F. Gates.

A year into his job, Williams faced a difficult tenure as he was at odds with the members of the Los Angeles Police Commission appointed by newly elected mayor Richard Riordan. Williams had concerns about Riordan's pledge to add 3,000 officers, and instead lobbied for internal reforms recommended by the Christopher Commission in 1991. He was also not popular with the LAPD rank-and-file, particularly when he did not cut short his vacation in Las Vegas to attend an officer's funeral. However, Williams was the most popular official in Los Angeles and he was credited with restoring confidence in the department.

Williams never took the POST exams required to become a peace officer in California. Not being POST certified, Williams as Chief of the Los Angeles Police Department could not make a felony arrest, and his provisional membership in the California Police Chiefs Association was terminated early in his tenure as Chief due to his lack of certification. The California legislature passed special legislation defining police chiefs as peace officers regardless of POST certification so Williams could carry a firearm.

In 1996, Williams published Taking Back Our Streets: Fighting Crime in America, co-written with Bruce Henderson. The book discusses Williams's philosophy of community policing and his efforts to revive and retrain a demoralized police force.

In 1997, the Los Angeles Police Commission declined to renew his contract, citing Williams' failure to fulfill his mandate to create meaningful change in the department in the wake of the 1992 Los Angeles riots. He was credited with strong public outreach, but faulted for management breakdowns. Williams threatened a lawsuit after city officials publicly questioned his honesty and management abilities. Under an agreement, he received $375,000 in severance in return for stepping down on May 17, seven weeks before his contract expired.

In 2002, Williams was appointed federal security director for Hartsfield Atlanta International Airport in Atlanta by U.S. Transportation Secretary Norman Mineta.

== Resources ==
- Pick the Best Chief, Period. Los Angeles Times July 29, 2002.

Police appointments
Preceded by Kevin M. Tucker	Commissioner of Philadelphia Police Department; 1988–1992	Succeeded by Richard Neal
Preceded by Daryl Gates	Chief of Los Angeles Police Department; 1992–1997	Succeeded by Bayan Lewis
