= Bayan Lewis =

American law enforcement executive

- Born: February 25, 1942 (age 84); Los Angeles, California, U.S.
- Police career
- Country: United States
- Department: Los Angeles Police Department
- Service years: 1963 - 1997
- Rank: Sworn in as an Officer - 1963: Chief of Police - 1997
- Awards: Police Meritorious Unit Citation; Police Meritorious Service Medal; 1984 Summer Olympics Ribbon; 1987 Papal Visit Ribbon

Bayan Lewis (born February 25, 1942) is an American police officer who served as the interim Chief of the Los Angeles Police Department in 1997.

== Education ==
Graduate of Pepperdine University in public administration, with postgraduate work at USC; also graduated from the Army Command and General Staff College at Ft. Leavenworth, Kansas.

== Career ==
Lewis joined the LAPD in April 1963. Reaching the rank of captain, he headed the anti-terrorist division for the Rampart and West Valley areas, and the west traffic division. As assistant chief, he served as director of the Office of Operations, responsible for 85% of the department's resources.

He served as director of the Office of Operations and was responsible for the department's largest command. Lewis was instrumental in creating the department's mobile field force.

He served in the 40th Infantry Division (Mechanized) of the California National Guard for 23 years, retiring as lieutenant colonel.

== Police chief ==
He was appointed by the LAPD commission on March 31, 1997. Prior to this, he had served in the department for 34 years. Lewis said he was uninterested in the permanent position. He served as director of the Office of Operations and was responsible for the department's largest command. Lewis was instrumental in creating the department's mobile field force.

Lewis took the position May 18, 1997, two months before the July 6 date Willie L. Williams was supposed to step down.

After retirement, Lewis became chief of the Los Angeles County Office of Public Safety. Lewis again retired in 2005 and was replaced by former LAPD deputy chief Margaret York.

Police appointments
Preceded by Willie L. Williams	Chief of Los Angeles Police Department; 1997	Succeeded by Bernard C. Parks
