= Emil Harris =

Los Angeles police chief, 1877–1878

- Born: Emil Harris; December 29, 1839; Prussia
- Died: April 28, 1921 (aged 81)
- Known for: First Jewish Chief of Police of Los Angeles, California
- Police career
- Service: Police Officer
- Allegiance: United States
- Department: Los Angeles Police Department
- Service years: 1877–1878 (Chief of Police)
- Status: Retired
- Rank: Chief of Police; Deputy Chief; Detective
- Other work: Mayor pro tempore of Los Angeles (1879)

Emil Harris (December 29, 1839 – April 28, 1921) was the only Jewish police chief in Los Angeles, California. He was also the second to have occupied the position since it was established in 1877. Harris was appointed to serve for one year from December 27, 1877 to December 5, 1878.

== Background ==
He was born in Prussia and immigrated to Los Angeles in 1869. He helped create the city's first volunteer fire department. He began a six-person police department where he quickly became a deputy chief. The Yiddish-speaking cop became chief after his leadership in the Chinatown massacre of 1871. He was previously a detective who - together with then chief B.F. "Frank" Hartley and other officers - captured the horse thief Tiburcio Vasquez in 1874 at the present-day intersection of Santa Monica Blvd. and Kings Road.

In 1879, he also became the mayor pro tempore of Los Angeles.

== Resources ==
- "L.A. Then and Now A Forgotten Hero From a Night of Disgrace," Cecilia Rasmussen, Los Angeles Times, May 16, 1999.

Police appointments
Preceded by Jacob F. Gerkens	Chief of LAPD	Succeeded by Henry King
