= Henry King (police officer) =

Los Angeles police chief (1832–1898)

- Born: Henry King; 26 May 1832; Ireland
- Died: 15 October 1898 (aged 66); South Beach, Santa Monica, California, U.S.
- Known for: Third Chief of Police, Los Angeles Police Department
- Spouse: Helen Costin (m. 1860)
- Relatives: Three sons and five daughters
- Police career
- Service: Los Angeles Police Department
- Allegiance: United States
- Department: Los Angeles Police Department
- Service years: 1878–1880, 1881–1883
- Status: Deceased
- Rank: Chief of Police
- Other work: Blacksmith, civic leader

Henry King (1832–1898) was a blacksmith who in 1878 became the third chief of police in Los Angeles, California. He served two terms of more than two years each, from December 5, 1878, to December 11, 1880, and from December 11, 1881, to June 30, 1883.

King was born in Ireland on May 26, 1832, but was brought up in St. Louis, Missouri, where he learned his trade. He came to the Pacific Coast in 1854, and "went to the mines in Amador County, where he spent one year, and the following year came to Los Angeles. . . .He was employed as a journeyman for ten years, after which he engaged in business for himself . . . . After a few years he went to San Francisco, where he resided six years, and then returned to Los Angeles and opened his present shop on Aliso street."

King was married on September 12, 1860, to Helen Costin of New York State. They had three sons and five daughters. King's mother, Mrs. James King, died on August 17, 1876, in her home in Kilmegan parish, County Down, Ireland, at age 84.

He was active in civic affairs, in 1875 being marshal of a St. Patrick's Day parade and serving on committees to observe Independence Day. He was president of the Total Abstinence Society and in 1876 was on a committee of the Irish Literary and Social Club "to receive and collect subscriptions" on behalf of "The Rescued Fenian Prisoners."

King was elected police chief by the Los Angeles Common Council on December 20, 1878. He was turned back in his bid for reelection in December 1880 when the council chose George E. Gard to replace him. A year later, the council chose King over Gard by a 8-7 vote, and he became chief again in January 1882.

Late in life he resided in South Beach, Santa Monica, where he died on October 15, 1898.

== See also ==
List of Los Angeles Police Chiefs

Police appointments
Preceded by Emil Harris	Chief of LAPD; 1878–1880	Succeeded by George E. Gard
Preceded by George E. Gard	Chief of LAPD; 1881–1883	Succeeded by Thomas J. Cuddy
