= John L. Butler =

Los Angeles chief of police, 1916–1919

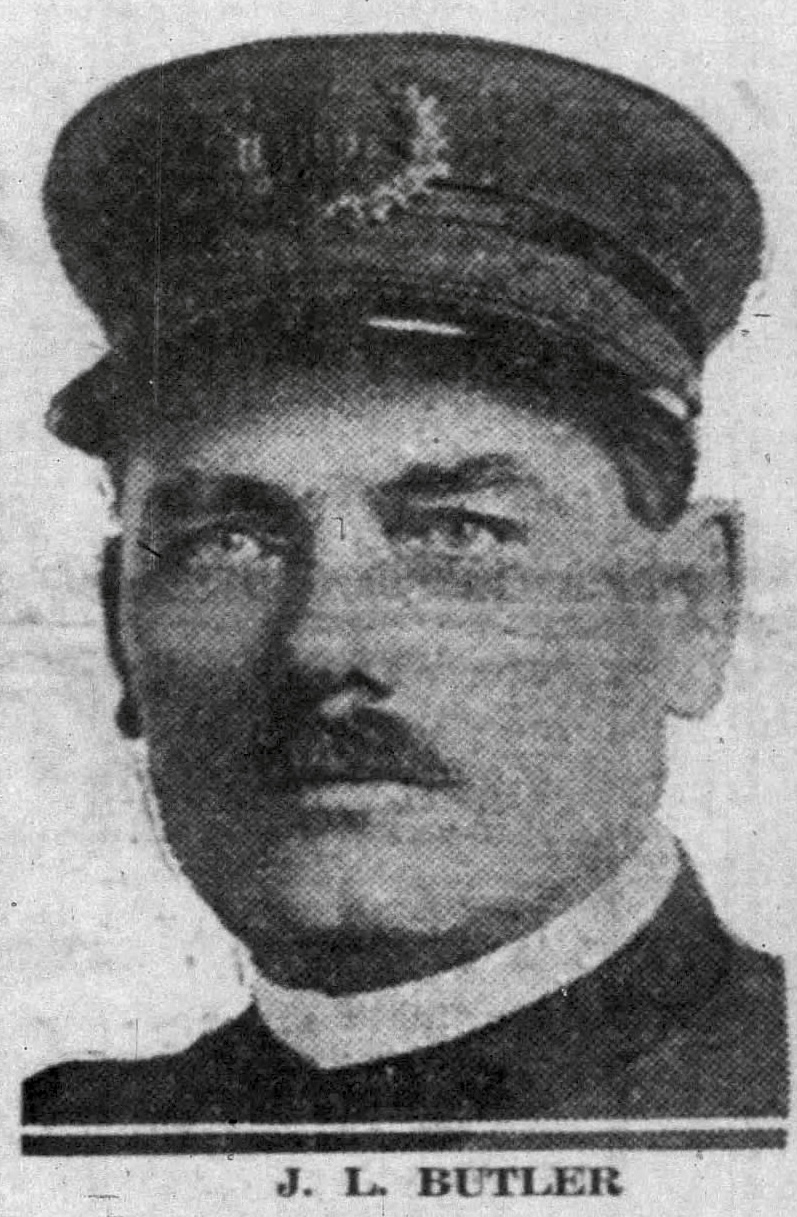
- Police career
- Country: United States
- Department: Los Angeles Police Department
- Rank: Chief of Police - 1916–1919

John L. Butler was chief of police of the Los Angeles Police Department for two years, eight months, and 20 days in the 1910s. Butler created a "War Squad" to deal with potential espionage and subversion amidst the U.S. participation in World War I. Overall, Butler served in the LAPD for 20 years, from 1901 to 1921.

== See also ==
- Chief of the Los Angeles Police Department § List of police chiefs

Police appointments
Preceded by Clarence E. Snively	Chief of LAPD; 1916–1919	Succeeded by George K. Home
