= Alexander Galloway (police) =

Los Angeles Chief of Police (1847–1915)

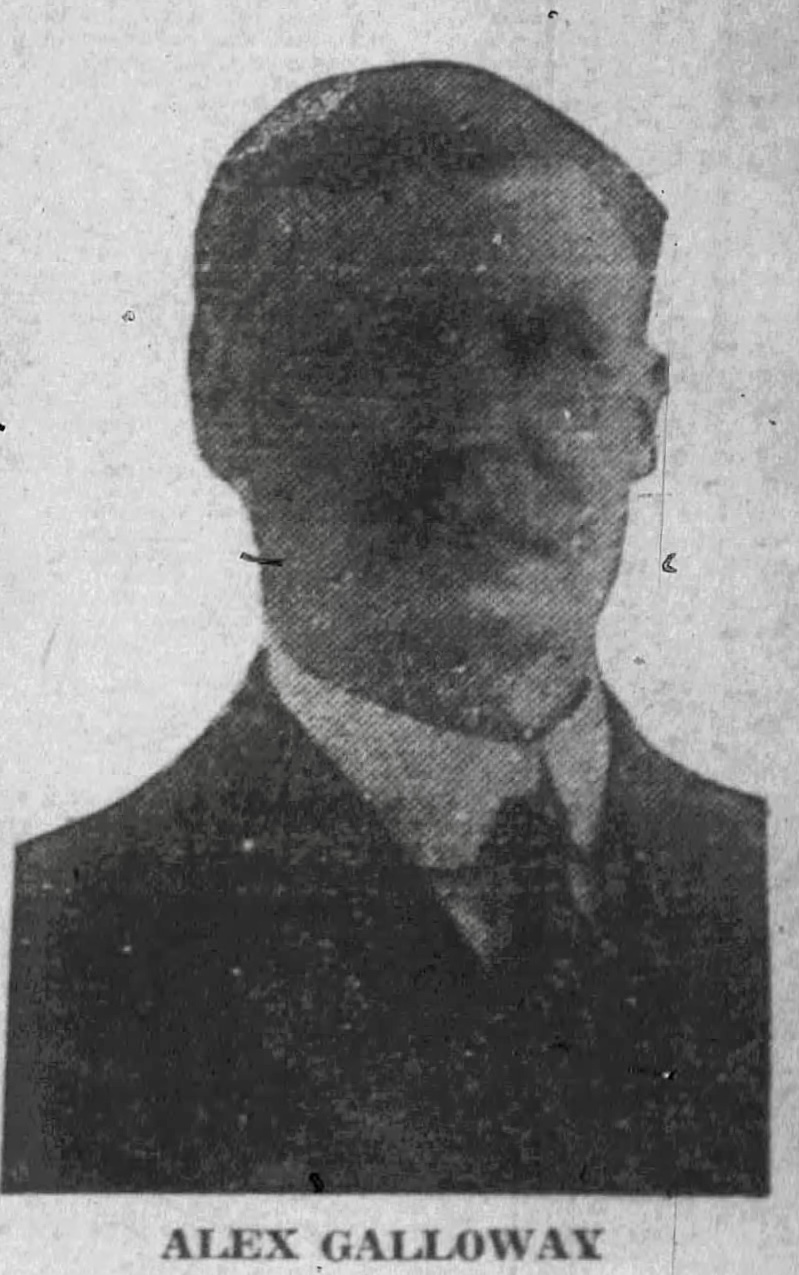
- Born: January 18, 1847; Glasgow, Scotland
- Died: August 24, 1915 (aged 68); Los Angeles, California, U.S.
- Police career
- Country: United States
- Department: Los Angeles Police Department
- Rank: Chief of Police - 1910–1911

Alexander Galloway (January 18, 1847 – August 24, 1915) served as the chief of police for the Los Angeles Police Department from February 14, 1910, to January 2, 1911, a tenure lasting 10 months and 21 days. He is remembered as one of a series of "inexperienced, non-professional chiefs". During his time in office he gave Alice Stebbin Wells her first police badge, making her one of the first policewomen in the world.

Born 1847 in Glasgow, Scotland, he immigrated to Montreal, Canada, with his family when he was a boy. Galloway later pursued a career on the railroad industry, ending his transportation-industry career with the Southern Pacific Railway. Galloway was succeeded as chief of police by Charles E. Sebastian, who would later serve as the mayor of Los Angeles. Galloway died in Los Angeles on August 24, 1915.

== See also ==
- Chief of the Los Angeles Police Department § List of police chiefs

Police appointments
Preceded by Edward F. Dishman	Chief of LAPD; 1910–1911	Succeeded by Charles E. Sebastian
