= Jacob F. Gerkens =

First Los Angeles police chief, 1876–1877

Jacob Frederick Gerkens
- Born: Jacob Frederick Gerkens; January 12, 1842; Duchy of Holstein
- Died: 26 December 1906 (aged 64); Los Angeles, California, U.S.
- Education: Self-educated; fluent in three languages
- Known for: First police chief of Los Angeles Police Department after abolition of city marshal
- Spouse: Maria Isidora Carabajal
- Relatives: Children: Charles F., Margurette, Annie
- Police career
- Country: Los Angeles Police Department
- Allegiance: United States
- Department: Los Angeles Police Department
- Service years: 1876–1877 (Chief), 1877–1879 (Assistant Chief)
- Status: Deceased
- Rank: Chief of Police
- Other work: Member of Los Angeles City Council

Jacob Frederick Gerkens (January 12, 1842 – December 26, 1906) was a German-American member of the Los Angeles City Council and the first police chief of that city after the abolition of the office of city marshal. He served for a little more than a year, from December 18, 1876 to December 26, 1877.

== Biography ==
Gerkins was born in the Duchy of Holstein on January 12, 1842. His parents emigrated to America during his early childhood and settled in Erie County, New York, near Buffalo. At age 16, Gerkens and his ox teams came direct to Los Angeles, where for several years he "was engaged in teaming and freighting." He next went to Yuma, Arizona, ran a ferry for a year, "and again engaged in freighting and carried on the business until 1865," then returned to California and worked as a ranch foreman for Robert Burnett for two years.

On January 9, 1867, he married Maria Isidora Carabajal, a native of Los Angeles. They had three children, Charles F., Margurette and Annie. Between 1867 and 1871 he was a sheep rancher and owned property on the southern slope of the Puente Hills. He built a house on Camilla Street in the community that became Whittier, California. Now known as the Bailey House, it is the oldest home in the city. "His next venture was in the grocery business, on San Fernando street, at the junction of Downey avenue."

He was twice elected a member of the Los Angeles City Council, and in 1877 sold his store and became police chief for a year and assistant police chief for two years thereafter. The Lewis history stated that "Mr. Gerkens never went to school in his life, but as a result of his self-education he can speak and write three different languages." He was described in the Lewis book as a capitalist, living at 9 Sotello Street, Los Angeles. The 1900 census has him living with his wife in the Garvanza district of Los Angeles, which at that time was in the Burbank Township.

He died in Los Angeles, aged 64.

== See also ==
- List of Los Angeles Police Department Chiefs of Police

Police appointments
Preceded by City marshal system	Chief of LAPD; 1876–1877	Succeeded by Emil Harris
