= Lyle Pendegast =

Los Angeles chief of police, 1921–1922

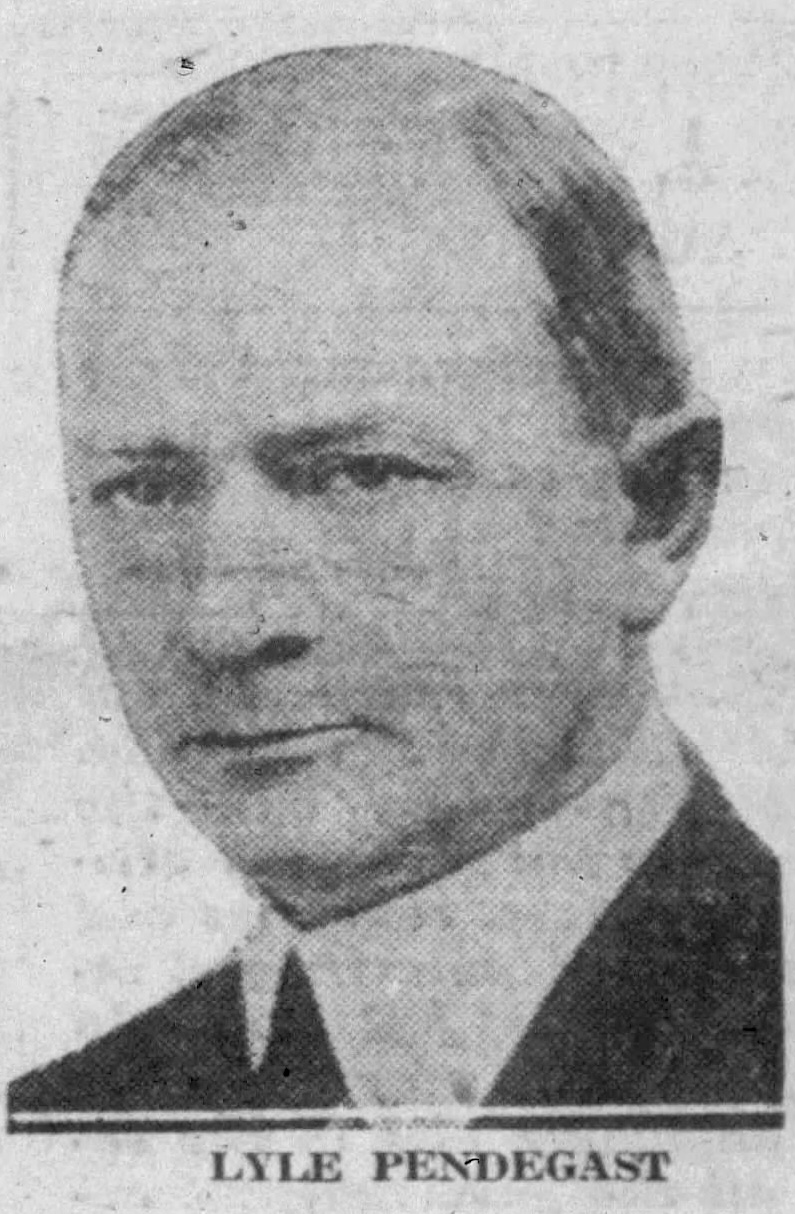
- Police career
- Country: United States
- Department: Los Angeles Police Department
- Rank: Chief of Police - 1920–1921

Lyle Pendegast was chief of police of the Los Angeles Police Department for eight months and three days in the early 1920s. Pendegast was an attorney by profession who had served as executive secretary to the preceding four chiefs of police.

== See also ==
- Chief of the Los Angeles Police Department § List of police chiefs

Police appointments
Preceded by Alexander W. Murray	Chief of LAPD; 1920–1921	Succeeded by Charles A. Jones
