= Chief of the Los Angeles Police Department =

Head of the Los Angeles Police Department

Chief of the City of Los Angeles Police Department
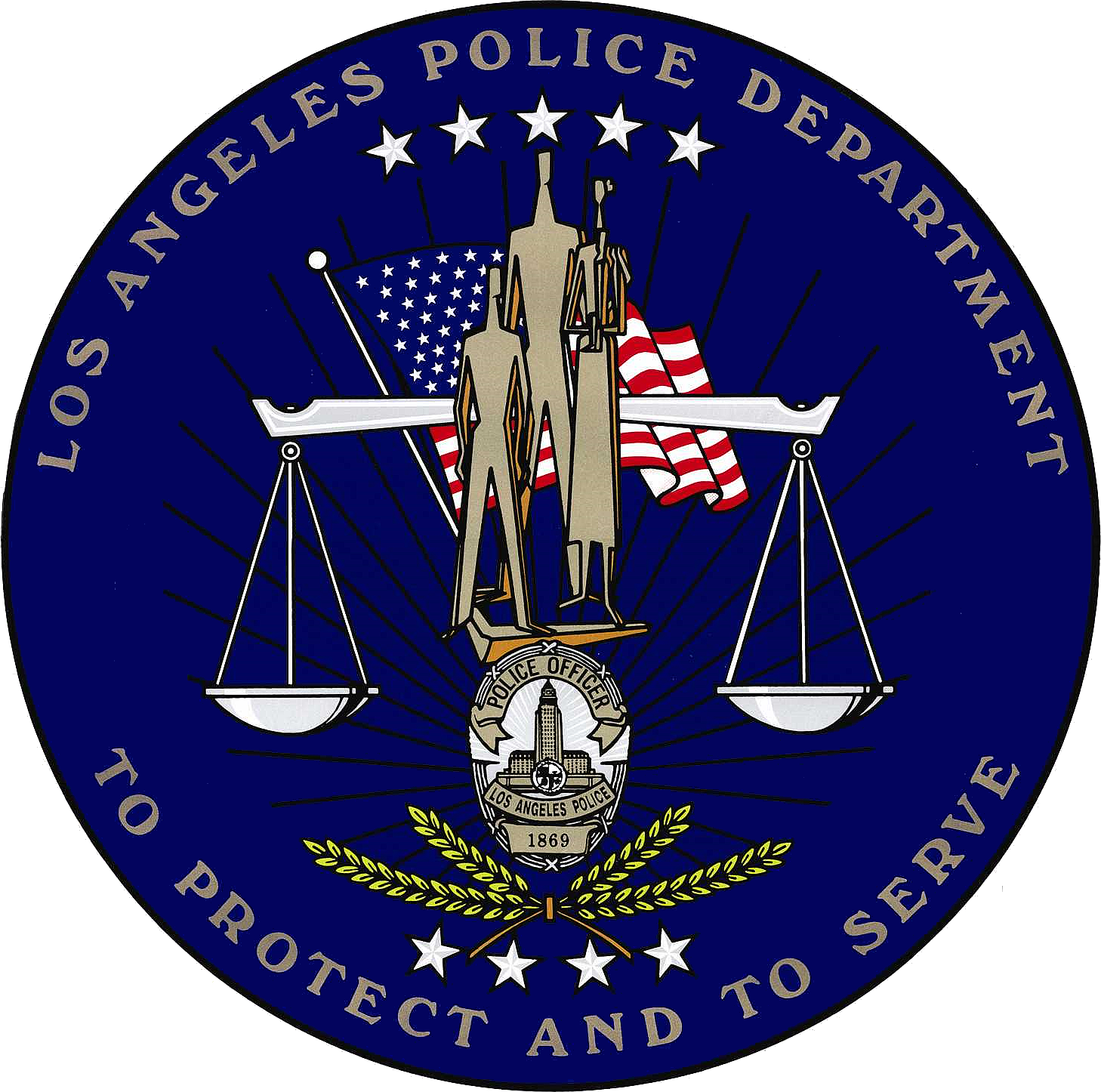
- Seal of the LAPD

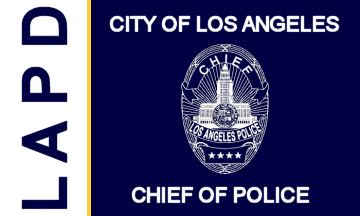
- Flag of the Chief of the LAPD

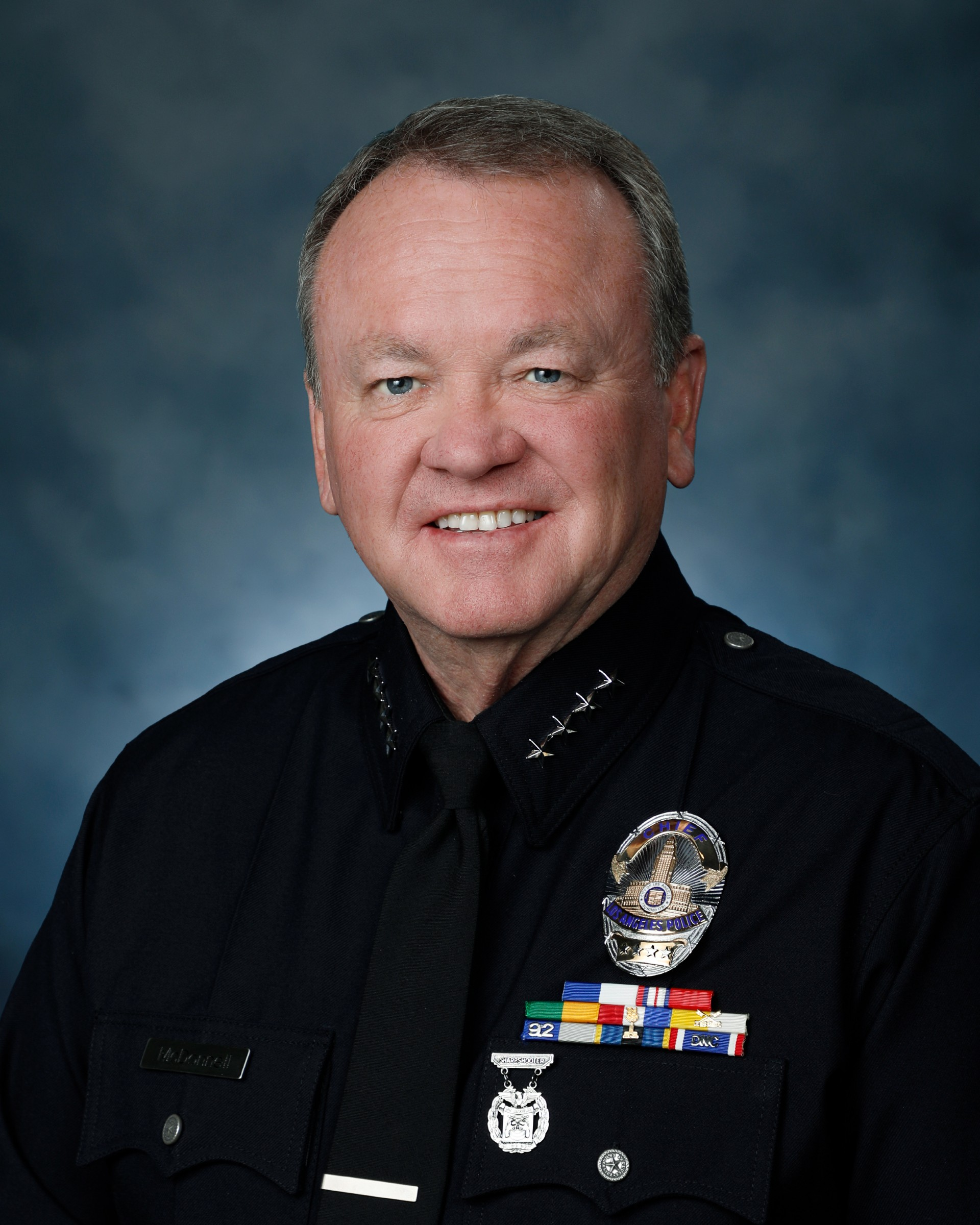
- Incumbent; Jim McDonnell since November 8, 2024
- Los Angeles Police Department
- Status: Chief of police
- Reports to: Board of Police Commissioners
- Seat: Los Angeles County, California, U.S.
- Appointer: Mayor of Los Angeles, with consent of city council.
- Term length: 5 years renewable
- Formation: December 18, 1876
- First holder: Jacob F. Gerkens
- Salary: $307,291
- Website: www.lapdonline.org

The chief of the Los Angeles Police Department is the head and senior-most officer to serve in the Los Angeles Police Department (LAPD). The incumbent manages the day-to-day operations of the LAPD and is usually held by a four star officer.

The chief of police is appointed by the mayor and reports to the Board of Commissioners.

== List of police chiefs ==
Chief	Term began	Term ended	Notes
Jacob F. Gerkens	December 18, 1876	December 26, 1877	
Emil Harris	December 27, 1877	December 5, 1878	
Henry King	December 5, 1878	December 11, 1880	
George E. Gard	December 12, 1880	December 10, 1881	
Henry King	December 11, 1881	June 30, 1883	
Thomas J. Cuddy	July 1, 1883	January 1, 1885	
Edward McCarthy	January 2, 1885	May 12, 1885	
John Horner	May 13, 1885	December 22, 1885	
James W. Davis	December 22, 1885	December 8, 1886	
John K. Skinner	December 13, 1886	August 29, 1887	
P.M. Darcy	September 5, 1887	January 22, 1888	
Thomas J. Cuddy	January 23, 1888	September 4, 1888	
L.G. Loomis	September 5, 1888	September 30, 1888	
Hubert H. Benedict	October 1, 1888	January 1, 1889	
Terrence Cooney	January 1, 1889	April 1, 1889	
James E. Burns	April 1, 1889	July 17, 1889	
John M. Glass	July 17, 1889	January 1, 1900	
Charles Elton	January 1, 1900	April 5, 1904	
William A. Hammel	April 6, 1904	October 31, 1905	
Walter H. Auble	November 1, 1905	November 20, 1906	
Edward Kern	November 20, 1906	January 5, 1909	
Thomas Broadhead	January 5, 1909	April 12, 1909	
Edward F. Dishman	April 13, 1909	January 15, 1910	
Alexander Galloway	February 14, 1910	December 27, 1910	
Charles E. Sebastian	January 3, 1911	July 16, 1915	
Clarence E. Snively	July 17, 1915	October 15, 1916	
John L. Butler	October 16, 1916	July 16, 1919	
George K. Home	July 17, 1919	September 30, 1920	
Alexander W. Murray	October 1, 1920	October 31, 1920	
Lyle Pendegast	November 1, 1920	July 4, 1921	
Charles A. Jones	July 5, 1921	January 3, 1922	
James W. Everington	January 4, 1922	April 21, 1922	
Louis D. Oaks	April 22, 1922	August 1, 1923	
August Vollmer	August 1, 1923	August 1, 1924	
R. Lee Heath	August 1, 1924	March 31, 1926	
James E. Davis	April 1, 1926	December 29, 1929	
Roy E. Steckel	December 30, 1929	August 9, 1933	
James E. Davis	August 10, 1933	November 18, 1938	
David A. Davidson	November 19, 1938	June 23, 1939	
Arthur C. Hohmann	June 24, 1939	June 5, 1941	
Clemence B. Horrall	June 16, 1941	June 28, 1949	
William A. Worton	June 30, 1949	August 9, 1950	Interim Chief
William H. Parker	August 9, 1950	July 16, 1966	
Thad F. Brown	July 18, 1966	February 17, 1967	
Thomas Reddin	February 18, 1967	May 5, 1969	
Roger E. Murdock	May 6, 1969	August 28, 1969	Interim Chief
Edward M. Davis	August 29, 1969	January 16, 1978	
Robert F. Rock	January 16, 1978	March 28, 1978	Interim Chief
Daryl F. Gates	March 28, 1978	June 27, 1992	
Willie L. Williams	June 30, 1992	May 17, 1997	
Bayan Lewis	May 18, 1997	August 12, 1997	Interim Chief
Bernard C. Parks	August 12, 1997	May 4, 2002	
William J. Bratton	October 27, 2002	October 31, 2009	
Michael P. Downing	October 31, 2009	November 17, 2009	Interim Chief
Charles L. Beck	November 17, 2009	June 27, 2018	
Michel Moore	June 27, 2018	February 29, 2024	
Dominic Choi	March 1, 2024	November 8, 2024	Interim Chief
Jim McDonnell	November 8, 2024	Incumbent	
