= Charles Elton (police) =

Los Angeles chief of police, 1900–1904

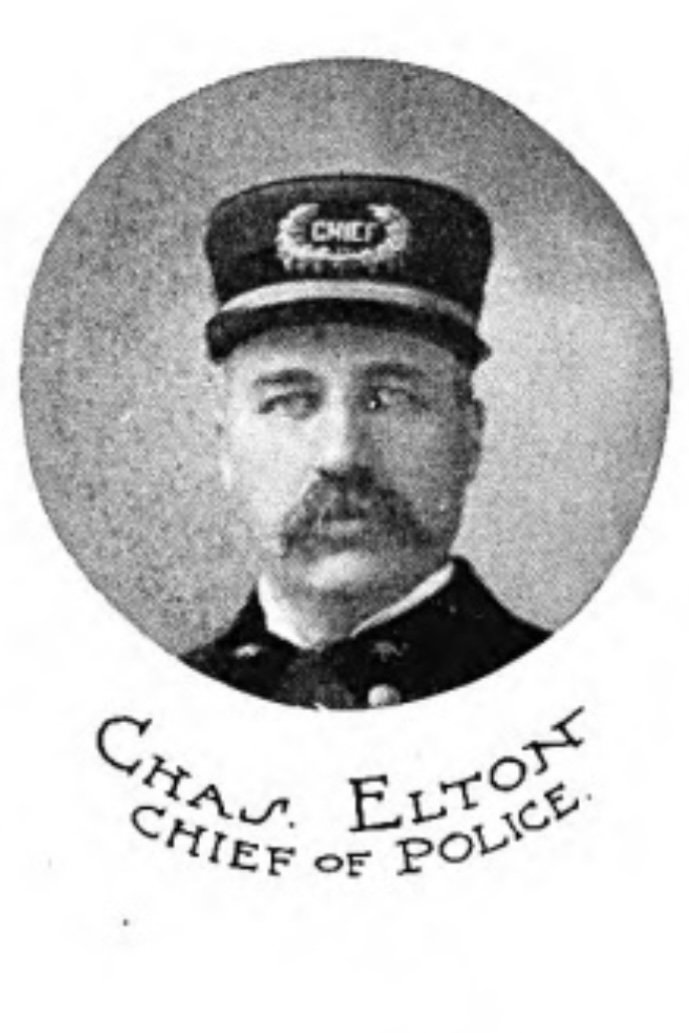
- Born: February 1855; New York
- Died: September 5, 1916
- Police career
- Department: Los Angeles Police Department
- Rank: Chief of Police (1900–1904)

Charles E. Elton (1855–1916) served as chief of police of the Los Angeles Police Department for four years, four months, and five days, which was a comparatively long stint in the first 50 years of the department.

== Biography ==
Elton was born in New York in February 1855. Prior to his appointment he had been a civilian with work experience as a railroad man and a real estate agent. One of his major innovations was a Flying Squad of bicycle-mounted officers, which greatly helped the undermanned department cover the already vast distances encompassed by the city of Los Angeles. A 1904 handbook to Southern California reported, "The salaries of Police Department are as follows, except the Chief, who is a city official: Captains, $150 per month; lieutenants, $125 per month; detectives, $125 per month; sergeants, $115 per month." Patrolmen made $75 to $100 a month depending on experience.

When he resigned in 1904, the Los Angeles Evening Express stated that his service had been "handicapped by previous inexperience, unfitted by mental attributes, not his fault, his appointment at the outset was a mistake due entirely to a political coup of his predecessor's enemies".

Elton was arrested in 1906 for failure to pay spousal support. He was in arrears $600. In 1910 Elton was working as a bicycle dealer in Portland, Oregon and got into a fight with a 13-year-old boy over money. Elton was arrested in 1911 at which time the United Press reported that he had been charged with "forgery in connection with a land deal. He was released on $1000 bond. Elton had resided in Portland for the last several years. He conducted an auto tire repair shop and dealt extensively in real estate."

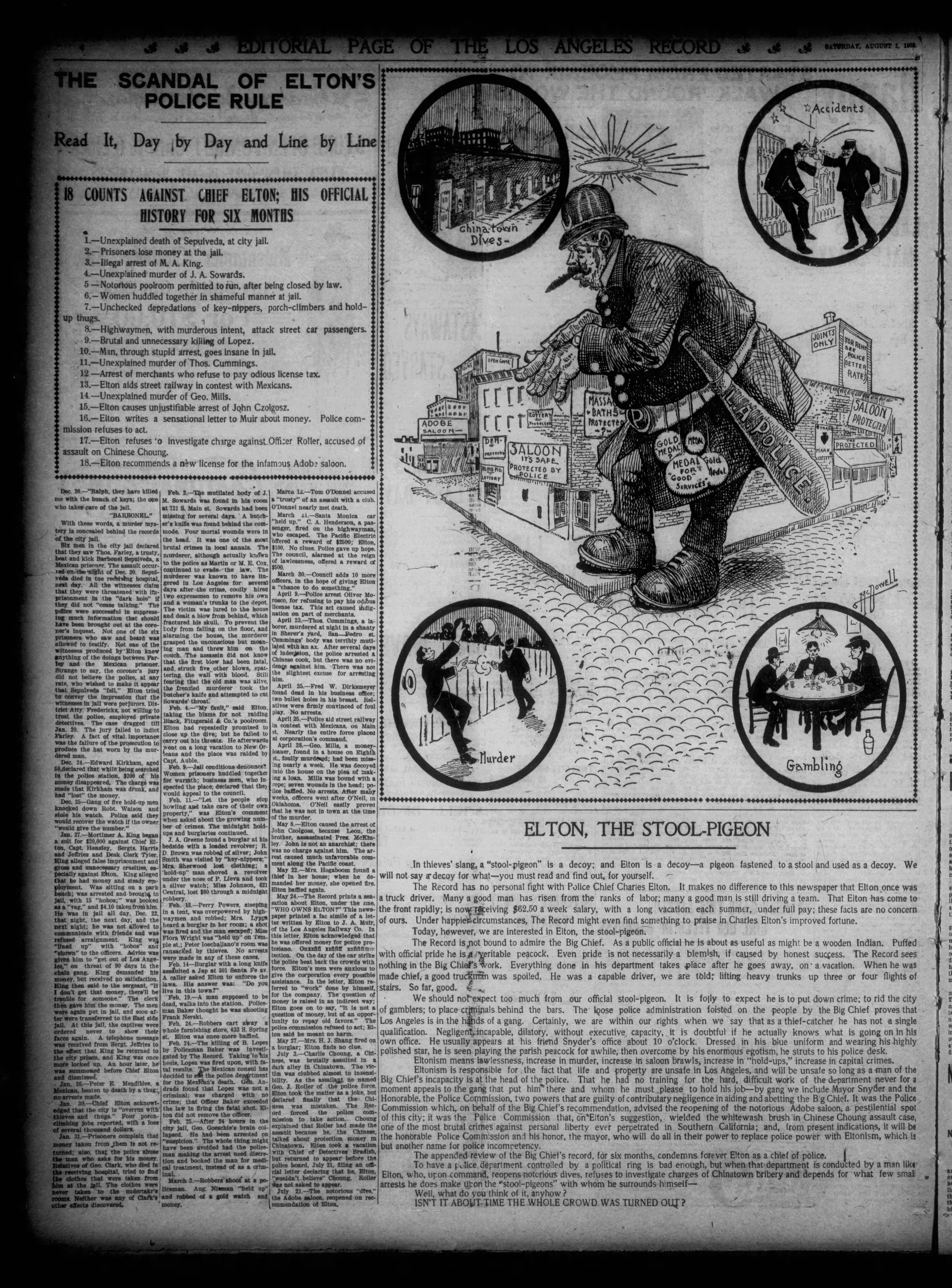
The Los Angeles Record editorialized firmly against Elton's leadership of the department

The Los Angeles Record summarized his career in 1924: "The regime of Charles Elton, appointee of Meredith P. Snyder, during the latter's first reign as mayor ushered in the century on about the same level that has in the main since been kept and struck the keynote of the tune to which save for occasional variations the city's police department has since kept then. In a word the Elton regime was foggy. There were rumors and denial and charges and countercharges with at bottom a constant realization on the part of the best informed that all was not as it should be. Elton kept the saddle from 1900 to 1904 when he retired under attacks by The Record to make room for W. A. Hammel."

== See also ==
- Chief of the Los Angeles Police Department § List of police chiefs

Police appointments
Preceded by John M. Glass	Chief of LAPD; 1900–1904	Succeeded by William A. Hammel
