= Edward F. Dishman =

Los Angeles chief of police, 1909–1910

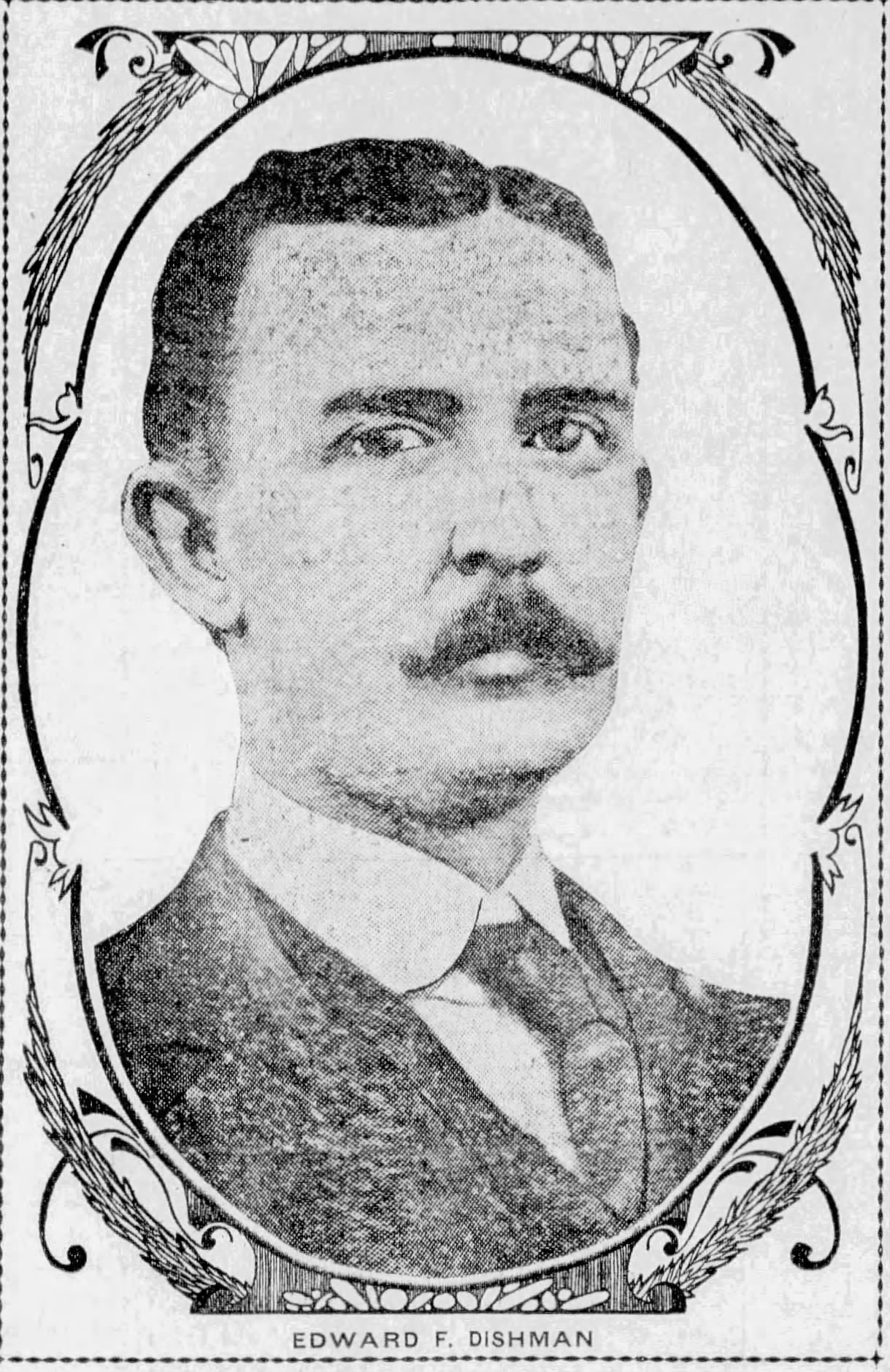
- Born: October 17, 1868; Indiana, United States
- Died: September 21, 1951 (aged 82); Los Angeles, California, United States
- Police career
- Country: United States
- Department: Los Angeles Police Department
- Rank: Chief of Police - 1909–1910

Edward F. Dishman (October 17, 1868 – September 21, 1951) was chief of police of the Los Angeles Police Department for ten months and 11 days in 1909–1910.

Dishman was a native of the U.S. state of Indiana. He had previously been a Los Angeles Times reporter on the police-department beat. Confounded by the police commission and city administration in his efforts to hire more officers or increase stagnant salaries, he was dismissed in short order by the police commission for non-performance in reforming the police department. After leaving the police department he worked for the post office, and then had a long career as an examiner for the California State Corporation Commission, investigating fraudulent stock offerings. He died in Los Angeles in 1951 and is buried at Forest Lawn Cemetery in Glendale.

== See also ==
- Chief of the Los Angeles Police Department § List of police chiefs

Police appointments
Preceded by Thomas Broadhead	Chief of LAPD; 1909–1910	Succeeded by Alexander Galloway
