= Kevin M. Tucker =

American police commissioner (1940–2012)

Commissioner of the Philadelphia Police Department
- In office January 1986 – June 1988
- Preceded by: Robert F. Armstrong (interim)
- Succeeded by: Willie L. Williams

Personal details
- Born: June 21, 1940 New York City
- Died: June 19, 2012 (aged 71) Mount Holly Township, New Jersey
- Spouse: Judy Kreshok (1966-2012)

Kevin M. Tucker (June 21, 1940 – June 19, 2012) was an American police commissioner of the Philadelphia Police Department from 1986 to 1988. Tucker was appointed police commissioner by Philadelphia Mayor Wilson Goode in 1986 in the aftermath of the 1985 MOVE bombing and a separate corruption scandal. Tucker is credited with implementing police department reforms, including the reintroduction of foot patrols, which are still used as of 2012. He stepped down as commissioner in 1988 for a position in the private sector.

== Biography ==
=== Early life ===
Tucker was born in Brooklyn, New York, on June 21, 1940, to Irish immigrant parents as one of his family's six children. His mother, Catherine Tucker, was a nurse and his father, William, worked for a railroad. He moved with his family to Rahway, New Jersey and graduated from St. Mary of the Assumption High School in Elizabeth. Tucker served in the Military Police Corps for three years after high school. He then enrolled at New Jersey State Teacher's College (now called Kean University), where he received a bachelor's degree in Russian history with the goal of pursuing a career as a teacher. He met his future wife, Judy Kreshok, while at Kean. The couple married on July 16, 1966.

=== Secret Service ===
Tucker worked nights with the Rahway Police Department to pay for his Kean University tuition. On one such night, Tucker cornered three attempted car thieves who were also wanted by the United States Secret Service for counterfeiting. His role in their capture led the Secret Service to offer him a job after graduation, where he worked as an agent for twenty years. Tucker's first assignment with the Secret Service was to protect former First Lady Jacqueline Kennedy and her two children. He protected her until she remarried in 1968.

During the 1970s, Tucker became the head of the Secret Service's regional field office in Philadelphia. He retired from the agency during the 1980s. Upon his retirement, Jacqueline Kennedy Onassis sent Tucker a book of John F. Kennedy's speeches in which she wrote, "To Kevin Tucker, whose humor and intelligence made our time together so memorable and missed."

=== Philadelphia Police Commissioner ===
By the mid-1980s, the Philadelphia Police Department was reeling from multiple scandals. Thirty officers, including high-ranking members of the department, had been convicted of extortion of brothels and illicit gambling rings, as well as other incidents of corruption, between 1982 and 1986 alone. Philadelphia Mayor Wilson Goode created an independent task force to evaluate the police department and potential reforms. The task force, in its findings, called the department, "unfocused, unmanaged, unaccountable, undertrained, underequipped."

The preceding Police Commissioner, Gregore J. Sambor, had resigned after the May 1985 standoff and bombing of the MOVE house in West Philadelphia. Sambor had ordered that a bomb be dropped from a helicopter on the house to destroy a rooftop bunker. The bombing killed 11 people, and the ensuing fire destroyed 61 neighborhood houses. Sambor resigned in the aftermath of the fire.

Tucker had recently retired from the Secret Service by 1985 when Mayor Wilson Goode asked him to become Police Commissioner. Tucker accepted Wilson's offer, becoming the first Commissioner to be chosen from outside the Philadelphia Police Department since the 1920s.

Tucker's appointment was initially opposed by several internal candidates within the department who wanted the position. His appointment was also opposed by the President of the police union, Robert Hurst, who a year after Tucker's arrival, "I fought like hell to keep him out... but the man came in and literally turned the department around."

Tucker implemented numerous reforms within the department, many of which are still in use today. He reintroduced uniformed foot patrols (now called community policing) to the city's neighborhoods, explaining, "I think the Police Department has a responsibility to try to foster a partnership with the community...It is very difficult to establish a relationship with a patrol car that is driving past at 30 miles an hour." He opened mini-police stations in high crime neighborhoods, reformed the work schedule to send more officers to problem areas, and offered Spanish language classes to police officers to better serve the Hispanic communities.

Tucker introduced standardized rules regarding police abuses. He replaced defective police equipment with new computers (Staff had sometimes had to bring personal typewriters to work in order to complete paperwork). Tucker also sent approximately fifty police commanders for three-week training courses and seminars at the John F. Kennedy School of Government at Harvard University.

He further improved the previously poor relations between the department and the local media.

Tucker retired from the police department in June 1988 to take a position as vice president of PNC Bank. He was succeeded by a close department protégé, Willie L. Williams.

=== Later life ===
Tucker was diagnosed with a brain tumor in 1990. He was initially told he had six months to live, but fortunately lived with the diagnosis for decades. He served on the board of the Wistar Institute for twelve years, including a tenure as board chairman from 1998 to 2005.

Tucker died at Samaritan Hospice Inpatient Center at Virtua Memorial Hospital in Mount Holly Township, New Jersey, on June 19, 2012, at the age of 71. He was survived by his wife, Judy; children, Kevin and Christine; three brothers - John, William and Edmund; his sister, Kathleen Cardigan; and four grandchildren. His funeral was held at St. Mary of the Lakes Church in Medford, New Jersey, and he was buried at Gate of Heaven Cemetery in East Hanover, New Jersey.

Police appointments
| Preceded by Robert F. Armstrong (interim) | Commissioner of Philadelphia Police Department; 1986–1988 | Succeeded by Willie L. Williams |
