= Clarence E. Snively =

LAPD Chief of Police, 1915–1916

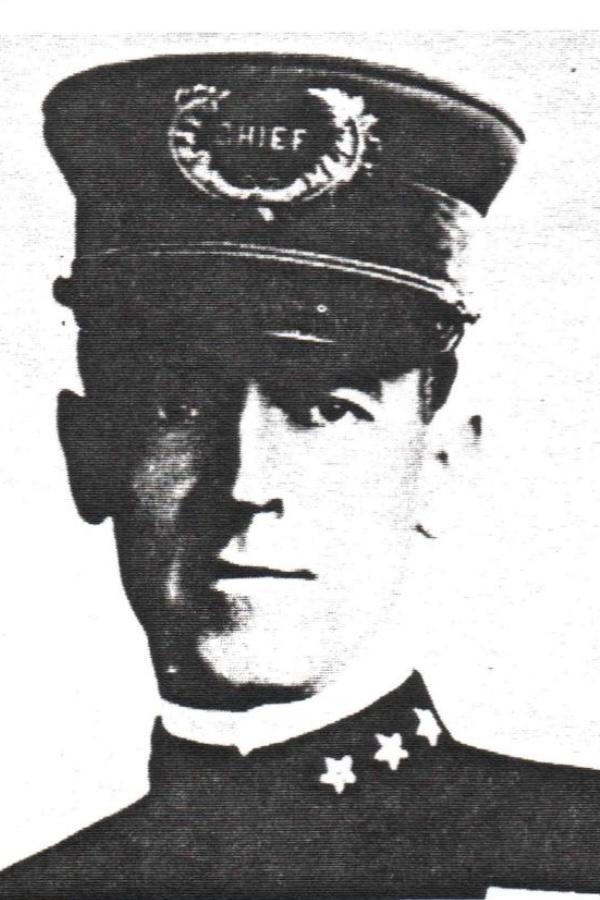
- Police career
- Country: United States
- Department: Los Angeles Police Department
- Rank: Chief of Police - 1915–1916

Clarence Eugene "Clare" Snively Jr. (February 8, 1874 – January 11, 1964) was chief of police of the Los Angeles Police Department for one year, three months, and eight days in 1915 to 1916. He is considered one of the "lesser-known" LAPD chiefs of the 20th century. He created an anti-nicotine clinic through the department, believing it to be a noxious substance that "weakened" bodies. He also worked as a reporter for several newspapers, including the Los Angeles Times, and as a federal probation officer for a large region of Southern California. Snively died in Santa Barbara County in 1964.

== See also ==
- Chief of the Los Angeles Police Department § List of police chiefs

Police appointments
Preceded by Charles E. Sebastian	Chief of LAPD; 1915–1916	Succeeded by John L. Butler
