= George K. Home =

LAPD Chief of Police, 1919–1920

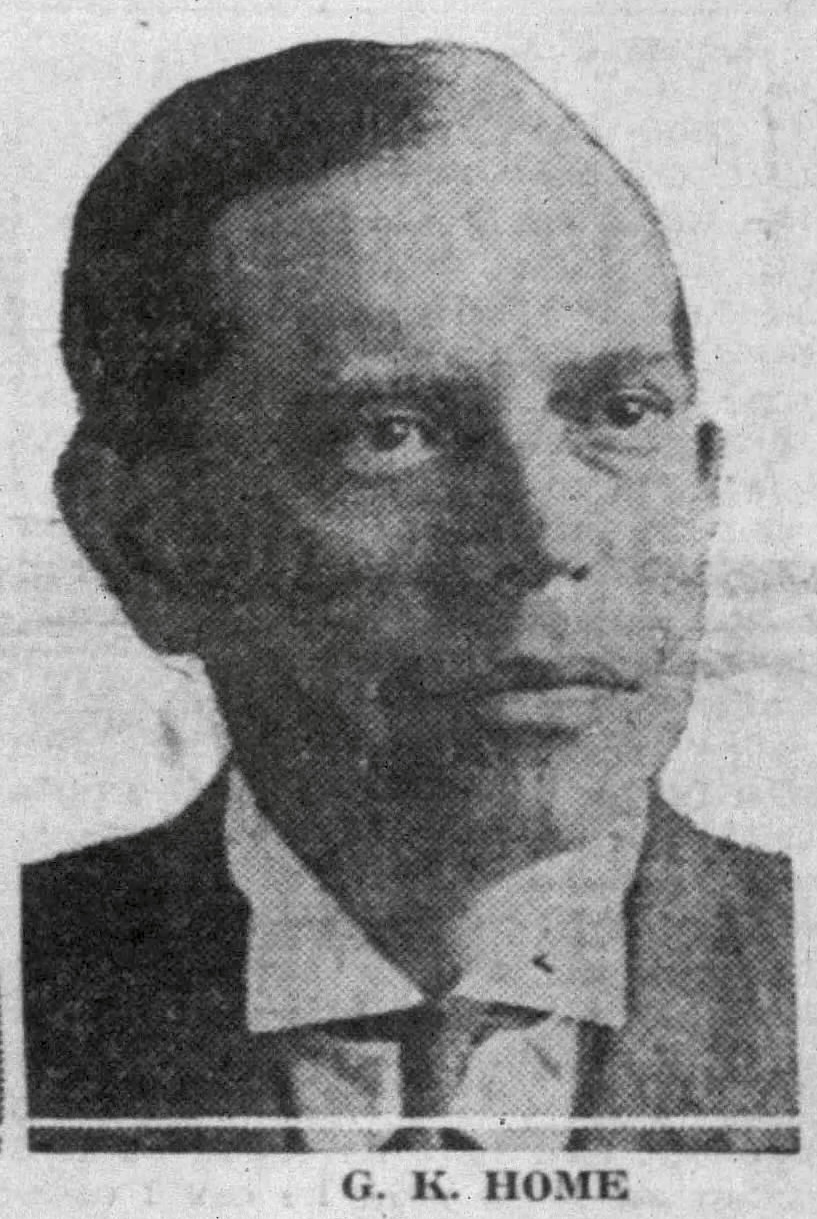
- Police career
- Country: United States
- Department: Los Angeles Police Department
- Rank: Chief of Police - 1919–1920

George K. Home was chief of police of the Los Angeles Police Department for one year, two months, and 23 days from 1919 to 1920. Home's administration coincided with the beginning of Prohibition and the coattendant increase in smuggling and associated crime. He is best remembered for hiring Harry J. Raymond and Herbert "Brute" Kittle, both of whom were charged with multiple crimes of their own, which reduced their effectiveness as law enforcement officers. Home later became "chief narcotic enforcement officer" for the state of California.

== See also ==
- Chief of the Los Angeles Police Department § List of police chiefs

Police appointments
Preceded by John L. Butler	Chief of LAPD; 1919–1920	Succeeded by Alexander W. Murray
