= Cliff Boro =

American entrepreneur

Clifford T. Boro
- Born: Clifford Todd Boro; May 19, 1970 (age 56); Leominster, Massachusetts
- Occupations: Businessperson; Chief executive officer, Entrepreneur
- Parent(s): Ira Michael Boro; Margaret Nason Boro
- Relatives: Gregory Boro
- Website: www.theteamgrp.com

Clifford Todd Boro is an American entrepreneur and startup investor. He is best known as cofounder and former CEO of KidZui (now Zui.com), a child-oriented web browser and search engine. Saban Brands bought Zui.com in September 2012. He founded Internet Financial Network (later Infogate). AOL Time Warner bought Infogate in March 2003. He is cofounder and managing partner of The Team Group, LLC, a technology startup/accelerator investment group. In addition, he has been chief executive officer, board member and cofounder at several other firms, including Internet Financial Network (Infogate), VideoEgg, mSnap and CVT Ventures, LLC.

== Personal life and early career ==
Born in Leominster, Mass., to Ira Michael and Margaret Nason Boro. He has a brother, Gregory. Boro attended the Dwight School, a private international school on Manhattan’s Upper West Side and graduated in 1988. Boro's later success led school officials to create the Cliff Boro Award. The school presents the award annually to students for innovative thought in science and technology.

Boro’s father supported and encouraged his son’s inquisitive nature. Boro said in a radio interview that he founded KidZui (March 2006) to provide children with a modern version of his father’s interest in him.

Boro began working at Steinhardt Partners, Soros Fund Management and Berg Partners as a full-time Wall Street trader while still in high school. Boro attended New York University and Brandeis University in 1992 and 1993, but did not graduate.

Boro lives in San Diego, California, and owns property in Port Saint Lucie, Florida. He is a major Democratic supporter in the Treasure Coast area. He is an avid sailor and blogs at offacliff.com.

== Career ==
=== Internet Financial Network and Infogate ===
Boro founded Internet Financial Network in 1994, where he was CEO and board chairman. IFN merged with EntryPoint Technologies (formed when EntryPoint acquired PointCast) in 2001 to become Infogate, a real-time Internet proprietary financial news feed. AOL Time Warner bought Infogate in March 2003.

IFN was one of the first software platforms to deliver and archive EDGAR information via the Internet. IFN announced a three-year agreement with Smith Barney, Inc. in 1997, to provide Smith Barney's investment banking and research offices with EdgarWatch and Smart Edgar.

Infogate began operations in August 2001. As Infogate, the company developed into a real-time headline feed for public companies’ filings with the Securities and Exchange Commission, including IPO filings. Infogate moved from an ad revenue model to a subscription-based model in 2002, when it partnered with media companies such as CNN, USA Today and the Tribune Company.

=== CVT Ventures, LLC ===
CVT Ventures, LLC, is a Delaware corporation based in San Diego, California. CVT provided seed, early and mid-stage/expansion funding, supporting services and advice to emerging companies, such as VideoEgg (later Say Media), Luxology, which later merged with the Foundry, a UK-based company and mSnap, (acquired by Marketron). Through CVT, Boro became a member of their executive or advisory boards. Luxology’s board chairman, Howard Morgan, vice chairman of Idealab and president and founder of the Arca Group, Inc., later invested in KidZui as part of First Round Capital.

=== KidZui and Zui.com ===
Boro cofounded KidZui (later Zui.com) in 2006 with Broadhead and Vignisson. The company markets free and paid versions of its web browser and search engine for children, 3–12. The browser and search works by accessing an extensive collection of sites, catalogued under the leadership of editor-in-chief Deanne Kells, former editor-in-chief at LeapFrog. It does not block or filter sites like other child-oriented Internet control programs.

Approximately 200 parents and teachers consult with the company to prescreen sites to permit children to access the Internet a safe, controlled manner. The browser provides a portal to 1.5 million pre-screened websites in 8,600 categories and millions of pages with age-appropriate content. The downloadable browser and search engine further divides webpages, videos and pictures by age category. KidZui launched the patented browser in spring 2008.

The privately held company received a total of $18.4 million in funding over several years from First Round Capital, Mission Ventures, Emergence Capital Partners, the Scholastic Corporation and Maveron.

Under Boro’s leadership, Zui inked distribution partnerships with Comcast, Best Buy, DreamWorks and other companies. Comcast offered a customized version to its subscribers. DreamWorks and KidZui integrated the lead character from the animated movie “How to Train Your Dragon” in DreamWorks’ social networking experience as part of an integrated sponsorship. Best Buy, the consumer electronics retailer, offers the KidZui browser as part of its software installation service.

Parenting magazines, social networks and blogs focused considerable attention on the browser. The company also created a KidZui extension to work on other browsers. Boro said in an interview, "Since launching in March, hundreds of thousands of kids and parents have seen the value in KidZui and have become active and engaged users. KidZui's Mozilla add-on now gives us the opportunity to connect with Mozilla's active community, giving them access to a safe social browser with just one click."

KidZui also launched a YouTube-style website, ZuiTube that features ZuiStars such as MattyB in an age-appropriate setting. In an interview with CNN Boro said, "The goal is to be both educational and entertaining, so KidZui has mapped out 8,600 channels of what kids are interested in, ranging from photosynthesis to Miley Cyrus. We relate all of those categories to each other so kids can independently and safely browse, search and share."

In 2011, KidZui became Zui.com, Inc. Saban Brands acquired the company in September 2012. Zui.com won Nappa Gold Winner (2008), the Children’s Technology Review Editor’s Choice Award (2009), the Parents Choice Award (2009), and the Wired Safety Best of the Web Award (2009).

=== The Team Group, LLC ===
Boro and Broadhead cofounded The Team Group, LLC in October 2012. Boro is the managing partner of the San Diego–based firm, which has two divisions, Team Services and Team Ventures. Team Group personnel work closely with their clients to provide expert services and smaller scale financing. In addition, Team Group helps clients develop business strategies and raise additional capital. Instead of taking venture capital fees, all partners receive a salary from the services portion of the business.

Team Services provides a financial and administrative services platform. The division manages personnel, accounting, finance and cash management tasks for nascent start-ups—web entrepreneurs that already have between $500,000 and $750,000 in seed or Series A funding and bootstrap entrepreneurs who have developed their enterprises into a cash flow position. The principle behind the services group allows young companies access to necessary administrative services without the burden of premature and ongoing payroll expense. Team Group’s services revenues help provide funds for the firm’s investment branch.

Team Ventures makes small, early stage investments, usually about $100,000, in emerging companies and provides advisory and support services for start-up founders. Jack Rivkin, a Wall Street investor and former head of CitiGroup’s Technology Venture Group, is one of several investors backing the firm’s venture capital division.

== Affiliations ==
Boro is actively involved in a number of entrepreneur-support efforts, including forums and events. Boro is a mentor with the Founder Institute, an entrepreneurial education organization.

Through CVT Ventures, LLC, Boro is a former Luxology advisory board member and former board chairman at mSnap and VideoEgg (joining First Round Capital’s Howard Morgan, Dr. Adam Klein, former vice president and president of global marketing at Hasbro, Inc., and Stephen Mack, founder and president of Gnomist, Inc.).

== Awards and recognition ==
In 2011, the Obama administration named Boro a 2011 Champion of Change for his innovative work in meeting technological challenges in the 21st century.

In September 2013, the U.S. Patent Office granted a patent to Boro and Broadhead for their unique methods and systems for facilitating electronic commerce using a child-oriented computer network application. Boro, with Broadhead and others, also holds patents on child-oriented computing systems, child-oriented computer network applications, advertising and user feedback methods and systems.
