= Thomas J. Cuddy =

Los Angeles police chief, 1883–1885, 1888

Thomas Jefferson Cuddy
- Other names: T.J. Cuddy, Tom
- Known for: Police chief of Los Angeles, member of Los Angeles Common Council
- Police career
- Department: Los Angeles Police Department
- Service years: 1883–1885, 1888
- Status: Deceased
- Rank: Chief of Police
- Other work: Member of Los Angeles Common Council

Thomas Jefferson Cuddy, known as T.J. Cuddy, nicknamed Tom, (died 1901) was a 19th-century police chief in Los Angeles, California, until bribery forced resignation, and member of the Los Angeles Common Council, the city's governing body. He served a six-month jail term for contempt of court.

== Career ==
Cuddy began his career with the city as an assistant Zanjero of Los Angeles, working on the Los Angeles water system.

Police chief

He served two terms as police chief, from July 1, 1883 to January 1, 1885, and from January 23, 1888 to September 4, 1888.

One of the cases for which he was noted during his first term was the killing of Henry Amadon by John Foster, the lover of Mrs. Amadon, in 1883, for which Foster and Mrs. Amadon were sent to San Quentin Prison.

In March 1888 a petition was brought to the Police Commission from the Girls' Home and from the Boys' and Girls' Aid Society asking that Mrs. H.A. Watson, the jail matron, be appointed as a special police officer "so that she might receive compensation for her services." Mayor Workman said he favored the idea, but Cuddy called it a "waste of money" and opined that establishing a reform school would be a good idea but "such an institution as Mrs. Watson represented did no permanent good, but kept the boys a short time and turned them out brighter criminals than before."

Cuddy was a member of the Los Angeles Common Council when he was chosen for the second time to be police chief by the council on the fifth ballot, eight votes for Cuddy and seven votes for Police Captain Darcy. Of this episode, the Oakland Tribune said:

During the preliminary proceedings in the Council there was always a strong hoodlum gallery which uproariously applauded every move of the Cuddy partisans. Their demonstrations of joy at his final success capped the climax. . . . The gallery opinion of the election of Chief Cuddy may be taken as a fair indication of the views of the criminal element on the matter.

Bribery

During Cuddy's second term he was implicated in the bribery of police officers by gambling interests in Chinatown when a commission appointed by Mayor William H. Workman heard testimony that he and others had received money "as insurance against police raids on the gambling houses." The committee, composed of Councilmen J.H. Book, Hiram Sinsabaugh and Matthew Teed, excoriated Cuddy in its report and unanimously urged that "the office of Chief of Police be declared vacant."

On September 24, 1888, the Common Council took up the report, and during the debate Cuddy

became greatly excited. An effort was made to quiet him, but to no purpose. He was there loaded, and proposed to express his opinions. His remarks were ill-tempered. . . . with a wave of his hand [he] declared he was weary of the gang, and would have nothing more to do with them, and tendered his resignation as Chief of Police.

It was accepted unanimously.

In a ceremony at the police station the next day, Mayor Workman took over command and assigned operations to Police Captain L.G. Loomis. In the afternoon, Cuddy was presented with a horse and buggy "by his personal friends on the force."

=== Common Council ===
Cuddy, a Democrat, was elected to represent the 2nd Ward on the Los Angeles Common Council on December 5, 1887, for a term lasting to December 1888, but he resigned on January 17, 1888, effective January 23, after the council voted him in as police chief.

== Legal problems ==
Cuddy, who by February 1889 was operating a saloon, was sentenced to six months in jail by U.S. U.S. Circuit Judge E.M. Ross, who found him guilty of contempt of court for having spoken to a juror about a tax case pending in Ross's court; Cuddy had asked that the juror favor the defendant. Cuddy lost two appeals to higher courts, and he served the full term, until August 12, 1889.

In December 1889 a jury found Cuddy guilty of embracery, an attempt to influence a judge or jury by corrupt means, and he was fined $750. Cuddy was also put on trial in federal court on a charge of perjury in connection with the same case, but he was declared innocent when the trial judge directed the jury to do so.

Cuddy was arrested in December 1895 and charged with being drunk and disturbing the peace when he engaged in an altercation with a police officer at First and Main Streets. A judge found him innocent of being drunk but fined him $5 on the other charge.

Whittier State School

In 1895–96 rumors were printed that Cuddy was under consideration to be appointed superintendent of the Whittier State School for delinquent children, to succeed John Coffin.

== Death ==
Cuddy went from Los Angeles to Mexico City and then to El Oro within the State of Mexico, where he managed a mine. He suffered from Bright's Disease, his death in El Oro was reported on October 4, 1901.

== See also ==
- List of Los Angeles Police Department Chiefs of Police

Police appointments
Preceded by Henry King	Chief of LAPD; 1883–1885	Succeeded by Edward McCarthy
Preceded by P.M. Darcy	Chief of LAPD; 1888	Succeeded by L.G. Loomis
