= Walter H. Auble =

Los Angeles chief of police, 1905–1906

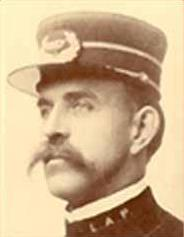
- Born: November 26, 1862; Illinois
- Died: September 9, 1908 (aged 45); Los Angeles, California
- Resting place: Inglewood Park Cemetery, Inglewood, California, U.S. 33.966566°N 118.338943°W
- Spouse: Florence (née Andrews)
- Children: 3
- Police career
- Department: Los Angeles Police Department
- Service years: 21
- Rank: Special Officer (1886); Officer (Jan 1, 1887); Detective (1890); Captain (1903); Chief (Nov 1905 – Nov 1906)

Walter H. Auble (November 26, 1862 – September 9, 1908) was the police chief in Los Angeles, California, on a one-year appointment from November 1905 to 1906.

== Biography ==
He was born in 1862 in Illinois and was killed in a shooting on September 9, 1908. He was only the third Los Angeles Police Department officer killed in the line of duty — the highest-ranking officer and the only former police chief. At the time of his death he was the longest-serving officer on the LAPD.

According to his obituary in the Los Angeles Herald of the next day, Auble was born in Illinois in 1861 and at the age of 25 was appointed a special officer and "worked at one of the prominent theaters of that day." On January 1, 1887, he was made a regular patrolman and became a detective three years later. He was appointed captain of police July 21, 1903.

He was married in 1888 to Florence Andrews. They had three children, Julia, Gladys and Earl. Auble was a member of the Westgate Masonic Lodge, a Scottish Rite Mason, 32nd degree, and belonged to Temple Al Malaikah Shrine. He was also a member of the Maccabees, tent No. 2 of Los Angeles.

Auble was slain by Carl Sutherland, a burglary suspect whom Auble and another officer were attempting to arrest in broad daylight on a city street. In a struggle to get the gun, Auble was shot in the neck, stomach and chest. Sutherland was tracked down by a posse but escaped prosecution by swallowing potassium cyanide. Sutherland died in a patrol wagon on his way to the same hospital where Auble had been taken — a hospital that was swarming with hundreds of residents intent on learning the fate of their police chief.

== See also ==
- List of homicides in California
- List of Los Angeles Police Department Chiefs of Police

Police appointments
Preceded by William A. Hammel	Chief of LAPD; 1905–1906	Succeeded by Edward Kern
