= R. Lee Heath =

LAPD Chief of Police, 1924–1926

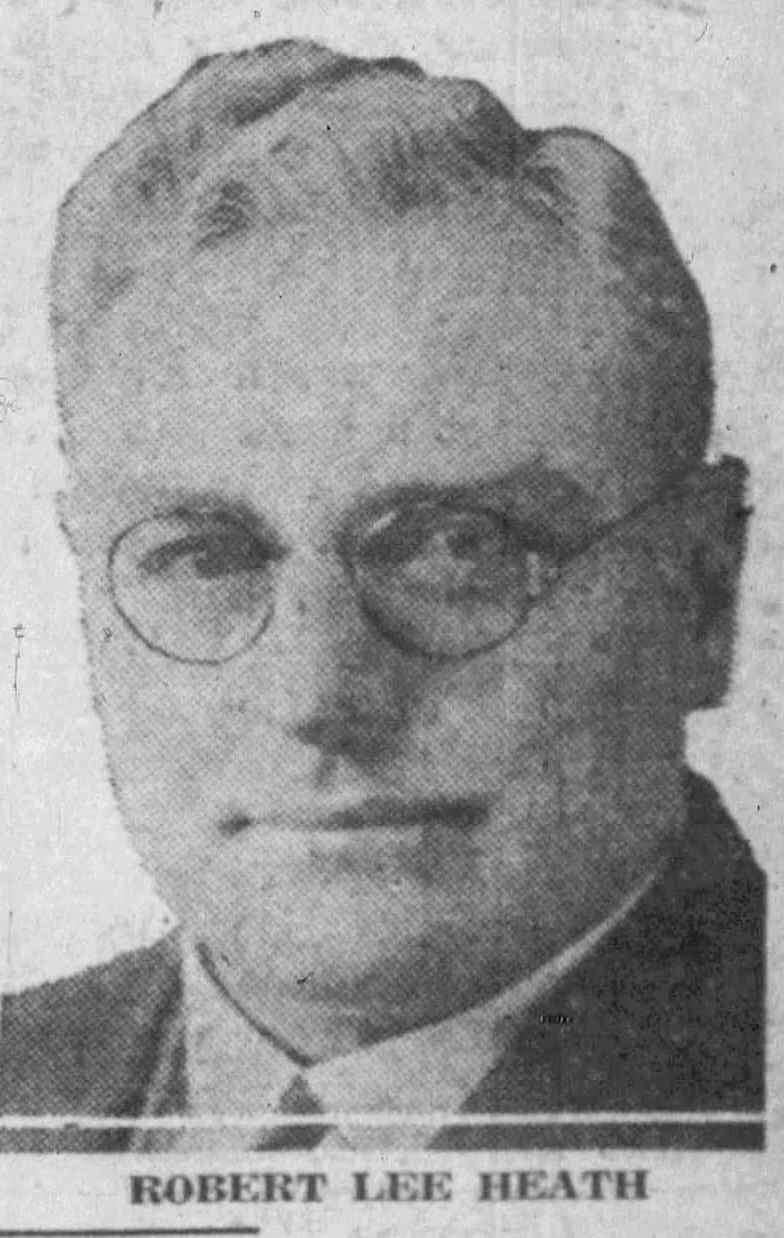
- Born: June 28, 1881; Mount Pleasant, Pennsylvania, US
- Died: December 28, 1974 (aged 93); Van Nuys, California, US
- Resting place: Forest Lawn Memorial Park
- Education: USC Law School
- Spouse: Essie B. Kempson (m. 1914)
- Police career
- Country: United States
- Department: Los Angeles Police Department
- Rank: Chief of Police 1924-26

Robert Lee Heath (1881–1974) was an American lawyer who served as Chief of Police of the Los Angeles Police Department from August 1, 1924 to March 31, 1926. Heath had joined the L.A.P.D. in 1904 and was reputed to be the most adroit politician in the department, eventually rising to the level of top cop. He was a police captain when he was appointed chief, replacing Chief August Vollmer, the former Police Chief of Berkeley, California who had served as interim chief for exactly one year.

Five new police stations were constructed while Heath was chief. To battle bootleggers and rum-runners during Prohibition, Heath had the L.A.P.D. purchase ten 30.06 Browning Automatic Rifles to enable his police force to counter the gangsters' firepower. He declined to purchase .30-caliber Browning machine guns.

== Biography ==
R. Lee Heath was born in Mount Pleasant, Pennsylvania on June 28, 1881. He attended USC Law School, and was admitted to the California bar in 1913. He married Essie B. Kempson the following year, and they had one daughter.

He died in Van Nuys on December 28, 1974, and was buried at Forest Lawn Memorial Park.

== Innovations ==
During his tenure as chief, the Chemical Lab and Photo Lab were created. Both served as forerunners to the L.A.P.D.'s Scientific Investigation Division. A separate division overseeing police training was first implemented in 1925.

Before he was appointed chief, Heath became intrigued by the possibilities of radio in law enforcement when he attended the Amateur Radio Show in Los Angeles in May 1924. The show featured hand-made radio receivers that could be mounted in an automobile and put to use for police work. At the 1925 National Radio Exposition, Heath demonstrated that an airplane equipped with a radio could follow an automobile and broadcast the vehicle's movements via radio station KRCA.

== Controversy ==
Heath allegedly was a protégé of Kent Kane Parrot, the chief of staff of Los Angeles Mayor George E. Cryer, the assistant district attorney who was elected in 1921 as a reformer. Known as the "De Facto Mayor of Los Angeles", Parrot served as the political boss of Los Angeles. He reputedly was the architect of "The Combination", the alliance between politicians, the police and the underworld, that ran L.A. for decades. Parrot was said to have run the L.A.P.D., making personnel transfers without consulting the Chief. He was closely connected to the king of L.A.'s vice rackets, Charlie Crawford. The Combination became so notorious during the Cryer Administration that it was called "The City Hall Gang".

Police appointments
Preceded by August Vollmer	Chief of LAPD; 1924–1926	Succeeded by James E. Davis
