= Thomas Broadhead =

Los Angeles chief of police in 1909

Thomas H. Broadhead
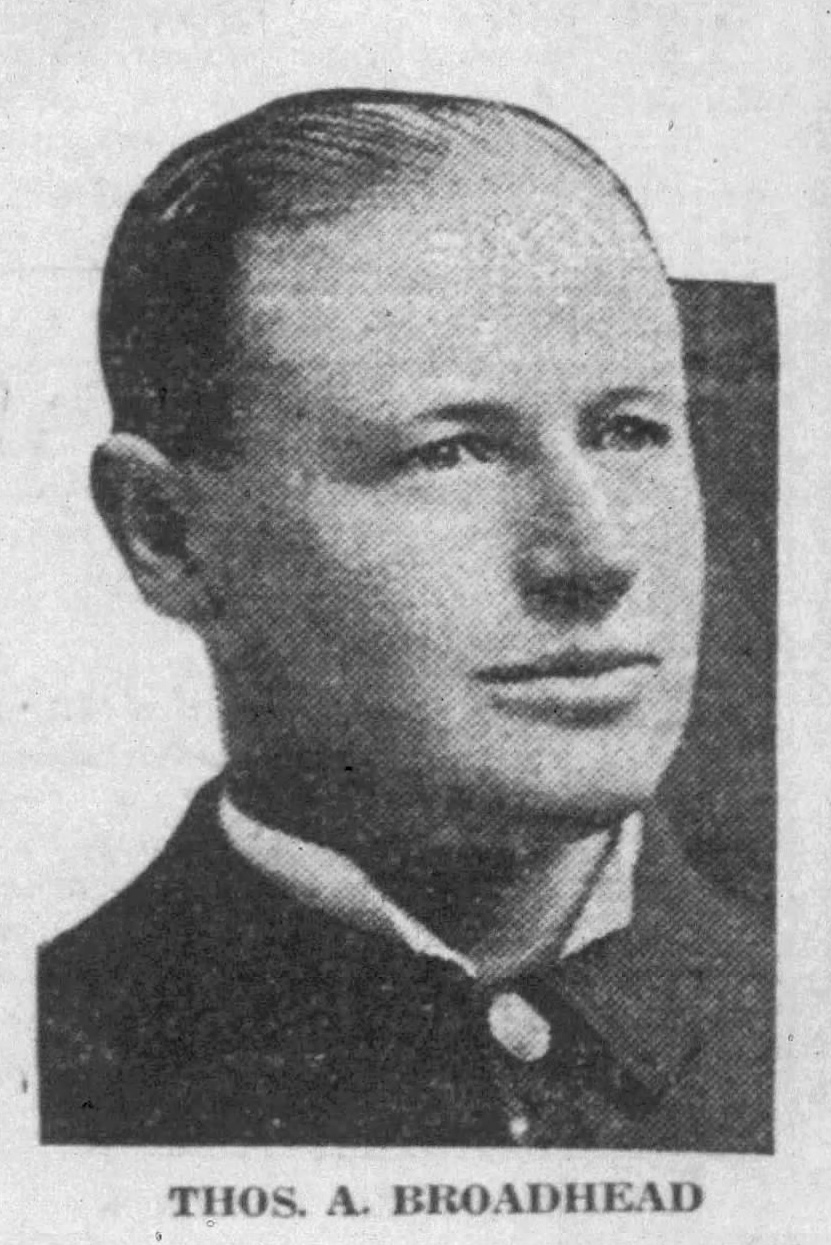
- Born: January 15, 1870; Kansas, United States
- Died: January 24, 1954 (aged 84); California
- Police career
- Country: United States
- Department: Los Angeles Police Department
- Rank: Chief of Police - 1909

Thomas H. Broadhead (January 15, 1870 – January 24, 1954) was chief of police of the Los Angeles Police Department for three months in 1909. A native of Kansas, Broadhead joined the LAPD around 1887, and he had previously been a member of the vice squad. He had been appointed by mayor Arthur C. Harper, and when Harper resigned due to a scandal and was replaced by mayor George Alexander, Broadhead was dismissed as chief and replaced with Edward F. Dishman. Captain Broadhead was indicted on bribery charges a week later, and acquitted in September 1909. After leaving the department, Broadhead went to work as a special agent for the Southern Pacific Railroad until 1924. He died in Los Angeles County, California, in 1954.

== See also ==
- Chief of the Los Angeles Police Department § List of police chiefs

Police appointments
Preceded by Edward Kern	Chief of LAPD; 1909	Succeeded by Edward F. Dishman
