= John M. Glass =

American politician and police chief (1843–1925)

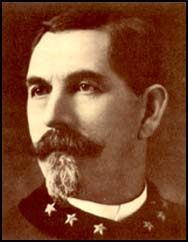
- John M. Glass as Police Chief

Mayor of Jeffersonville
- In office 1883–1885
- Preceded by: Luther Warder
- Succeeded by: Herman Preefer

Chief of LAPD
- In office 1889–1900
- Preceded by: James E. Burns
- Succeeded by: Charles Elton

Personal details
- Born: 1843 Bethlehem, Indiana
- Died: 1925 (aged 81–82) California
- Party: Republican

John M. Glass (1843–1925) was a mayor of Jeffersonville, Indiana, and Chief of Police of Los Angeles, California.

== Biography ==
=== Jeffersonville ===
John Glass was the Marshal of Jeffersonville, Indiana, from 1879 to 1883 before becoming the mayor of Jeffersonville. He defeated Luther Warder for mayoral and served as mayor from 1883 to 1885. In 1884 as Mayor he appealed to the Board of Trade Relief Committee to attempt to acquire several thousand pounds of meat, coffee, and bread to help stimulate the trade market in Jeffersonville. He also attempted to acquire $50,000 from Congress for the city's levee system. When the money wasn't received John Glass claimed that some residents of the town had paid $1,250 to officers of the house of the 48th Congress. In April 1886 he resigned from his position and was then subject to examination of the House Civil Service Committee of charges of bribery.

=== Los Angeles ===
Following the end of his political career in Jeffersonville, John moved to Los Angeles and joined the Los Angeles Police Department. On July 17, 1889, John became the 17th Chief of Police for Los Angeles, and the first to exceed two years as Chief of Police. John served until January 1, 1900. Twenty-five Chiefs later, no one had served longer than John Glass at that position until William H. Parker, who served for 16 years.

During his career as Chief of Police he set up the first police districts, substations, patrol wagon, entry level officer requirements, police matron, and California's first adoption of the Alphonse Bertillon identification system. He increased the manpower of the police by 20%. In addition he made the police officer appear more military with the purchase of Winchester rifles and military style uniforms, and with drills conducted outside their central station. However, as in every city, problems occur, and by 1900 John Glass was falling behind with only about 70 officers for the city's 100,000 population. Under political pressure, John Glass was replaced by Charles Elton.

== See also ==
- List of mayors of Jeffersonville, Indiana
- List of Los Angeles Police Department Chiefs of Police

Police appointments
Preceded by James E. Burns	Chief of LAPD; 1889–1900	Succeeded by Charles Elton
