= Charles A. Jones (police) =

LAPD Chief of Police, 1921–1922

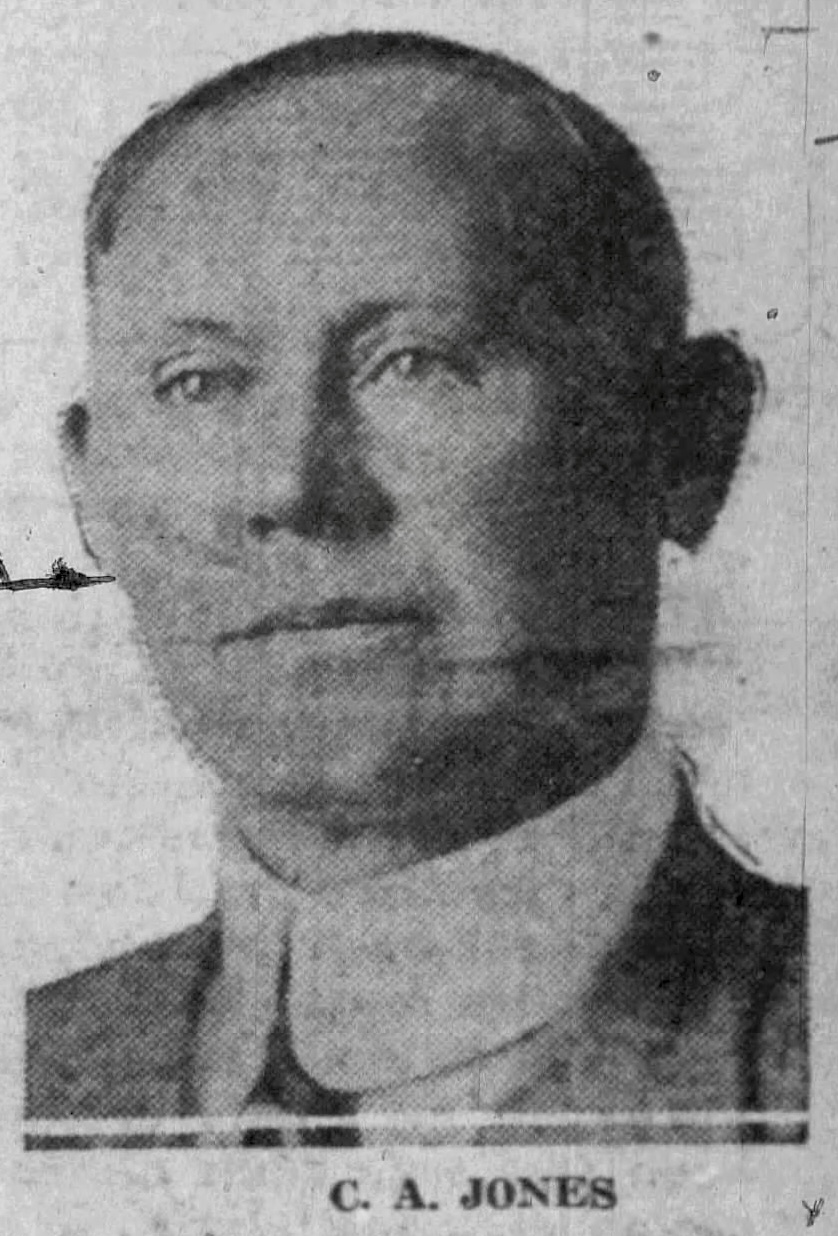
- Police career
- Country: United States
- Department: Los Angeles Police Department
- Rank: Chief of Police - 1921–1922

Charles A. Jones was chief of police of the Los Angeles Police Department for five months and 28 days in the early 1920s. A career policeman who had worked his way through the ranks for 20 years, Jones was promoted to chief from within the department. Apparently pestered to distraction by public advocates, Jones announced his resignation with the statement, "No one can run the Los Angeles Police Department. There are too many meddlesome so-called reformers and others who interfere. The job isn't worth the grief that attends it."

== See also ==
- Chief of the Los Angeles Police Department § List of police chiefs

Police appointments
| Preceded by Lyle Pendegast | Chief of LAPD; 1921–1922 | Succeeded by James W. Everington |
