= James W. Everington =

Los Angeles police chief in 1922

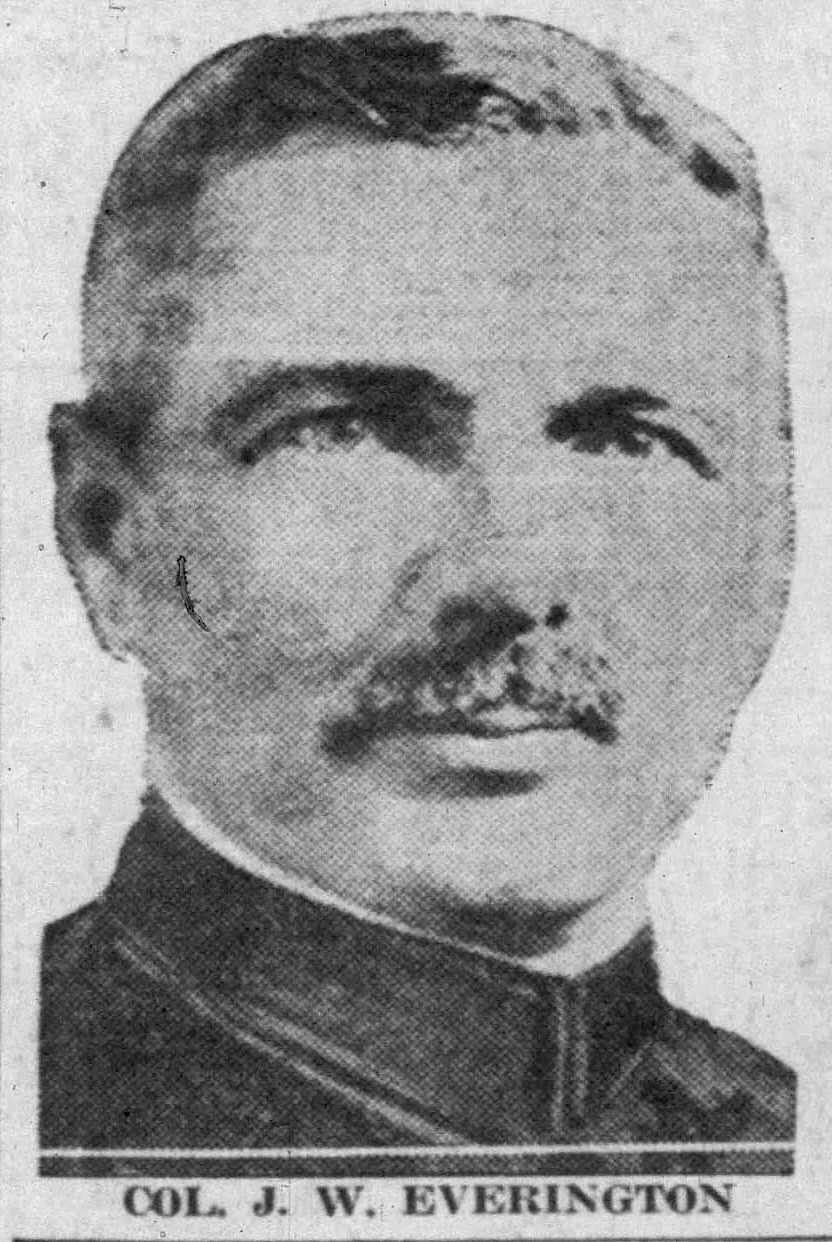
- Police career
- Country: United States
- Department: Los Angeles Police Department
- Rank: Chief of Police - 1922

James W. Everington served as the Chief of Police of the Los Angeles Police Department for four months, from January 4 to April 22, 1922, when he succeeded Charles A. Jones, and was succeeded by Louis D. Oaks.

Los Angeles was a notorious corrupt city in the first half of the 20th century, and corruption in the L.A.P.D. was rampant. The L.A.P.D. achieved a certain degree of professionalism under Chief John M. Glass (in office July 17, 1889 to January 1, 1900), who ushered the department into the 20th century. A Police Commission came into being, but there were 14 chiefs between 1900 and 1922, with only two chiefs serving a minimum of three years.

Everington, one of three chiefs who headed the L.A.P.D. in the calendar year of 1922, summed up the dilemma when he said that he never actually ran the L.A.P.D. as "an honest man can't do that." Everington went on to say, "A crook can be chief, though, if he's clever enough not to get caught."

Police appointments
Preceded by Charles A. Jones	Chief of LAPD; January 4, 1922–April 21, 1922	Succeeded by Louis D. Oaks
