= Edward Kern (police officer) =

American politician (1860–1912)

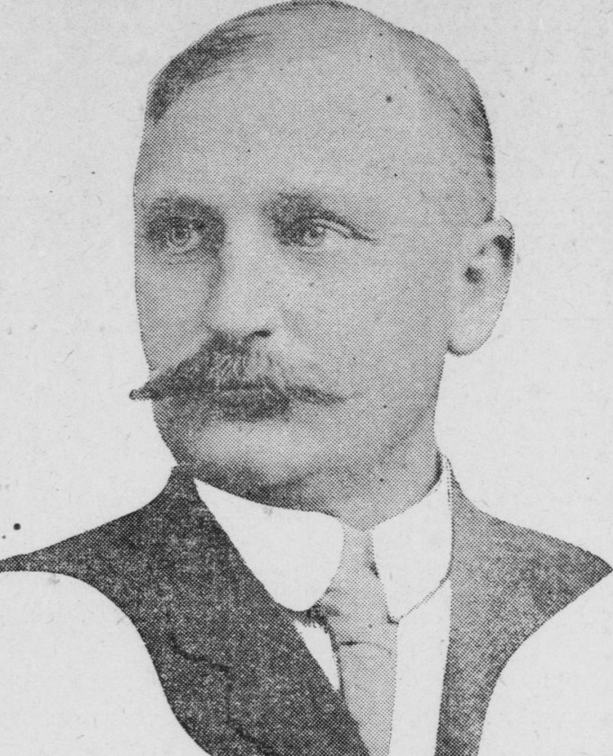
- Kern in 1909
- Born: Edward Kern; 1860; Norwalk, Iowa, U.S.
- Died: 1912 (aged 51–52); Los Angeles, California, U.S.
- Known for: Police Chief of Los Angeles Police Department, service in Geronimo campaign
- Police career
- Military service: United States Army
- Allegiance: United States
- Department: Los Angeles Police Department
- Service years: Until 1886 (Army), 1906–1909 (Police Chief)
- Status: Deceased
- Rank: Chief of Police
- Other work: Los Angeles City Councilman (7th Ward), 1902–1906; Board of Public Works member, 1909

Edward Kern (1860 – 1912) was a politician and police chief from Los Angeles, California. He also served in the war against Geronimo.

== Early life ==
Kern was born on a farm in Norwalk, Iowa, in 1860. At age 19, he went to Colorado, where he was a teamster. He moved through New Mexico to Arizona, where he did railroad construction work. Later, in Prescott, Arizona, he was chief of supplies, or "forage master," under General George R. Crook in the Army's campaign against the Indian leader Geronimo. When Nelson A. Miles took over from Crook in 1886, the new commander placed Kern in charge of the commissary.

Kern came to Los Angeles along with Miles the same year, and Kern was discharged there. He then became a driver for the Los Angeles Ice and Cold Storage Company, rising to the position of a superintendent. He was also a stockholder in the company.

In 1906 Kern was described at age 46 as being "a great, broad-shouldered giant, with a grip like a steel vise."

== Municipal service ==
=== City Council ===
In December 1902 Kern was elected to the Los Angeles City Council to represent the 7th Ward. He was reelected in 1904, but resigned on November 26, 1906, after he was appointed as police chief.

=== Police chief ===
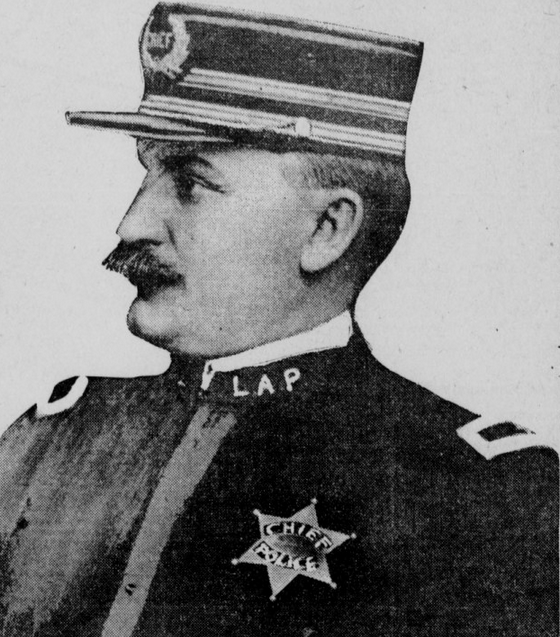
Kern as Chief of the Los Angeles Police Department, 1908

The police board unanimously reappointed him as chief on January 8, 1907. In 1908 he was reappointed as a director of the National Association of Chiefs of Police and announced that Los Angeles would be the site of the group's next convention.

In a lengthy statement published in the Los Angeles Herald, Kern stressed that "The proposition of handling the Socialist speakers who are contending with the authorities for the right of what they call free speech has not reached the dignity of a problem in my mind." He said that the demonstrators "are not criminals or lawbreakers . . . . In every way except one they are peaceable, law-abiding men and women. They persist in breaking the one ordinance on the city books which prohibits them from speaking on the streets without a permit from the police commission." He stressed that the police would enforce the law.

In 1909 Kern, then retired, was a defense witness in a criminal case against Police Captain Thomas A. Broadhead, who was charged with accepting a bribe for protecting the red-light district in Los Angeles during the time that Kern was police chief. Under direct examination, after testifying about his life background and history, he answered most other questions by defense counsel in a negative way, such as "I did not," "He did not" and "He never did." Under questioning by the prosecution, though, Kern was asked if he had told City Attorney Thomas L. Woolwine that "you would not close" the houses of prostitution because "it would scatter them all over the city." Kern responded, "I don't recall it in those words." Broadhead was acquitted.

=== Board of Public Works ===
In January 1909 Kern resigned as police chief and was appointed by Mayor Arthur Harper to the Board of Public Works. His stint in office, however, lasted only two months because, in the wake of complaints that he was unqualified, he unexpectedly quit his new job in March. His appointment had been met with such disfavor that it was one of the reasons for a successful recall petition drive that eventually led to Mayor Harper's resignation.

== Illness and death ==
In October 1911, Kern, then living in Ocean Park, California, "was given to periodical drunken sprees" and, after examination by a medical committee, he was admitted voluntarily to the State Hospital for Inebriates in Patton, California, on the advice of his physician, Dr. Sumner J. Quint, who was made his legal guardian. The Los Angeles Times reported that as he was packing for his trip "Kern yesterday presented a pitiful spectacle. , , , His face was unshaven, haggard and drawn."

The next year, Kern, who had been ill "for months," went to El Paso, Texas, on business, and soon his body was found by a chambermaid on April 20, 1912, in a hotel room bathtub with a bullet through the head. There was no message, but a revolver that friends had given him in Los Angeles lay beside the body.

A funeral service was conducted on April 27, 1912, by the Fraternal Order of Eagles in their lodge at 320 South Main Street, Los Angeles. Hundreds attended, many of them weeping, and the bier was guarded by policemen and firemen. The eulogy was given by close friend Earl Rogers, "who touched upon the sweet, kindly and whole-souled character of Kern." He was survived by his wife.

Police appointments
Preceded by Walter H. Auble	Chief of LAPD; 1906–1909	Succeeded by Thomas Broadhead
