= Louis D. Oaks =

LAPD Chief of Police (c. 1883–1938)

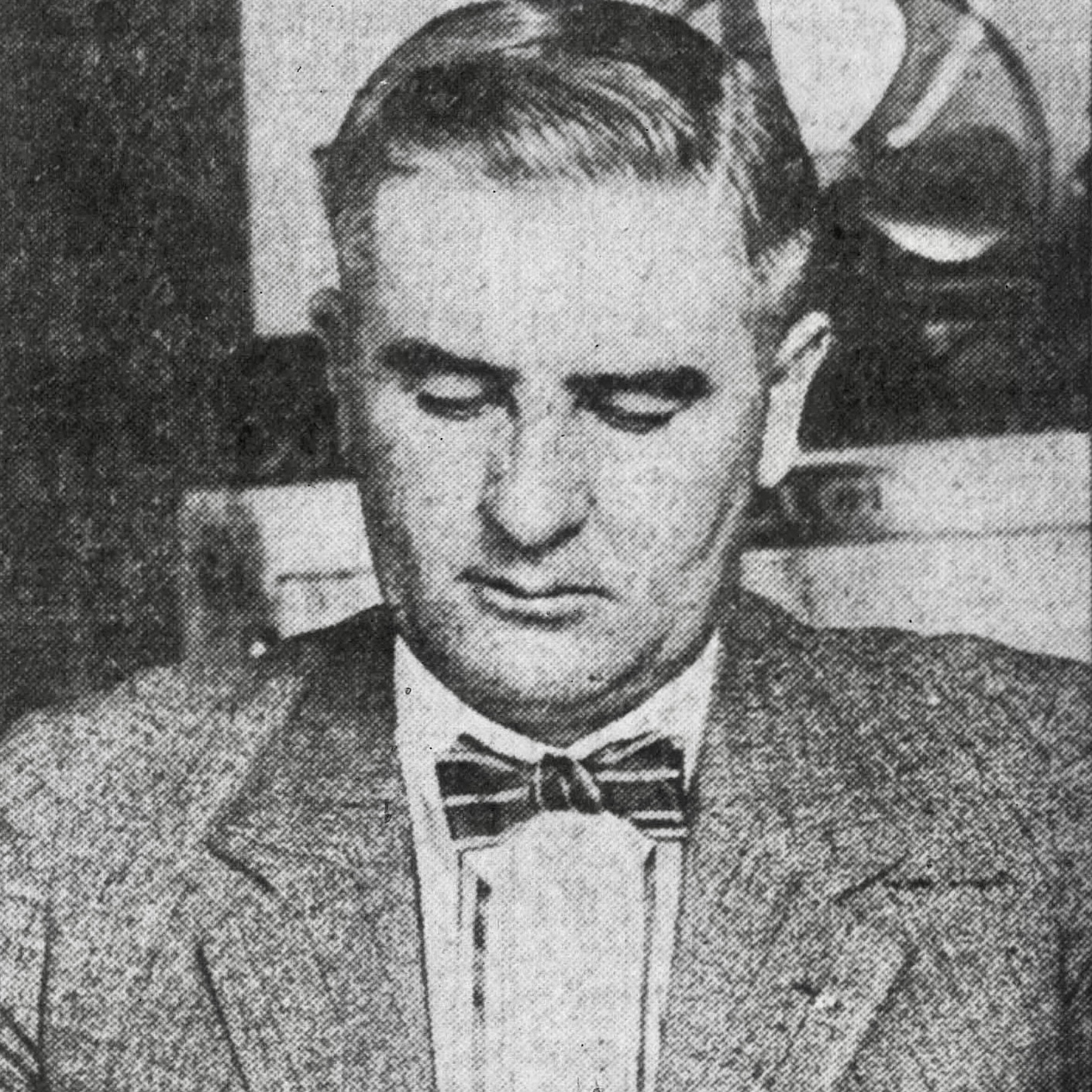
- Oaks in the Los Angeles Record (July 28, 1923)
- Born: c. 1883
- Died: August 2, 1938 (aged ~55)
- Police career
- Country: United States
- Department: Los Angeles Police Department
- Rank: Chief of Police - 1922–23

Louis D. Oaks (c. 1883 – August 2, 1938) was an American police officer. He served as the Chief of Police of the Los Angeles Police Department from April 22, 1922 to August 1, 1923. He succeeded James W. Everington and was succeeded by ex-Berkeley, California Police Chief August Vollmer, a prominent criminologist.

During his short term as chief, Oaks frequently clashed with Los Angeles City Council member Ralph Luther Criswell. In 1922, Criswell claimed that "members of the police department have been levying thousands of dollars in protection money." Subsequently, for several weeks, he blocked Oaks' request for 1,500 badges for his police officers and 50 Dodge automobiles for the L.A.P.D.

== Upton Sinclair incident ==
In 1923, Oaks also clashed with Upton Sinclair, a prominent writer and socialist politician, when one of the L.A.P.D.'s Red Squads virtually kidnapped the writer at a rally in San Pedro. The San Pedro rally was held in support of the free speech rights of Industrial Workers of the World (IWW). As Sinclair began to read from the Bill of Rights, he was promptly arrested by officers of the L.A.P.D. The arresting officer proclaimed that "we'll have none of that Constitution stuff." Sinclair was arrested despite the fact that his appearance at the rally was already cleared by the office of Los Angeles Mayor George E. Cryer, which had declared it would allow him to exercise his free speech rights as long as he did not make an incitement to violence. Chief Oaks, a member of the KKK, who claimed that Sinclair was "more dangerous than 4,000 I.W.W.", had one of his police officers swear out a complaint on which Sinclair was arrested. The complaint charged Sinclair with the offense of "discussing, arguing, orating and debating certain thoughts and theories, which... were detrimental and in opposition to the orderly conduct of affairs of business, affecting the rights of private property...."

Hundreds of other rally attendees also were arrested by the L.A.P.D., but Sinclair was given "special" treatment as part of a plan by Oaks to silence him, not just at the rally, but for years to come. Oaks had issued a public statement, declaring, "I will prosecute Sinclair with all the vigor at my command, and upon his conviction I will demand a jail sentence with hard labor." Police officers drove him from station to station, but failed to lodge charges against him. In all, he was held incommunicado for 22 hours. Chief Davis had planned to have Sinclair arraigned just before the close of court on Friday afternoon, effectively concealing his whereabouts by not pressing charges against him and moving him about in order to deny him his right to a writ of habeas corpus.

Oaks' plan was thwarted when the plot was revealed to Sinclair's wife, Mary Craig, by a police official. Sinclair's attorneys were ready with a writ when he was finally brought to court.

== Charles P. Williams ==
Charles P. Williams was the first African American policeman in the L.A.P.D. to be killed in the line of duty. Williams was working undercover when he was shot and killed by the owner of a house being used for prostitution. The owner was attempting to evict the prostitutes. Chief Oaks personally led the manhunt for his killer. (At the time, it was not publicly known that Williams was African American.)

== Termination ==
Chief Oaks had a reputation as a hard-drinking womanizer. He was arrested by San Bernardino police, who discovered Oaks in the backseat of an automobile, accompanied by a "half-dressed woman and a half-empty bottle of whiskey."

Reform-minded Protestant clergymen, including the politically active radio preacher Robert P. "Fighting Bob" Shuler, who was the president of the Ministerial Union, targeted Oaks. Shuler and other Protestant ministers had been active in the reform and anti-vice movements in predominately Protestant Los Angeles, and they had applied direct political pressure on both the mayor and the chief of police. Shuler staked out a speakeasy and saw the chief exiting in an inebriated state, accompanied by two women, neither of whom were his wife. After publicly revealing that he had seen Oaks womanizing and drinking (the latter being a crime during Prohibition), Oaks was ousted as chief by Mayor Cryer.

Police appointments
| Preceded by James W. Everington | Chief of LAPD; 1922–1923 | Succeeded by August Vollmer |
