= William A. Hammel =

LAPD Chief of Police, LA County Sheriff

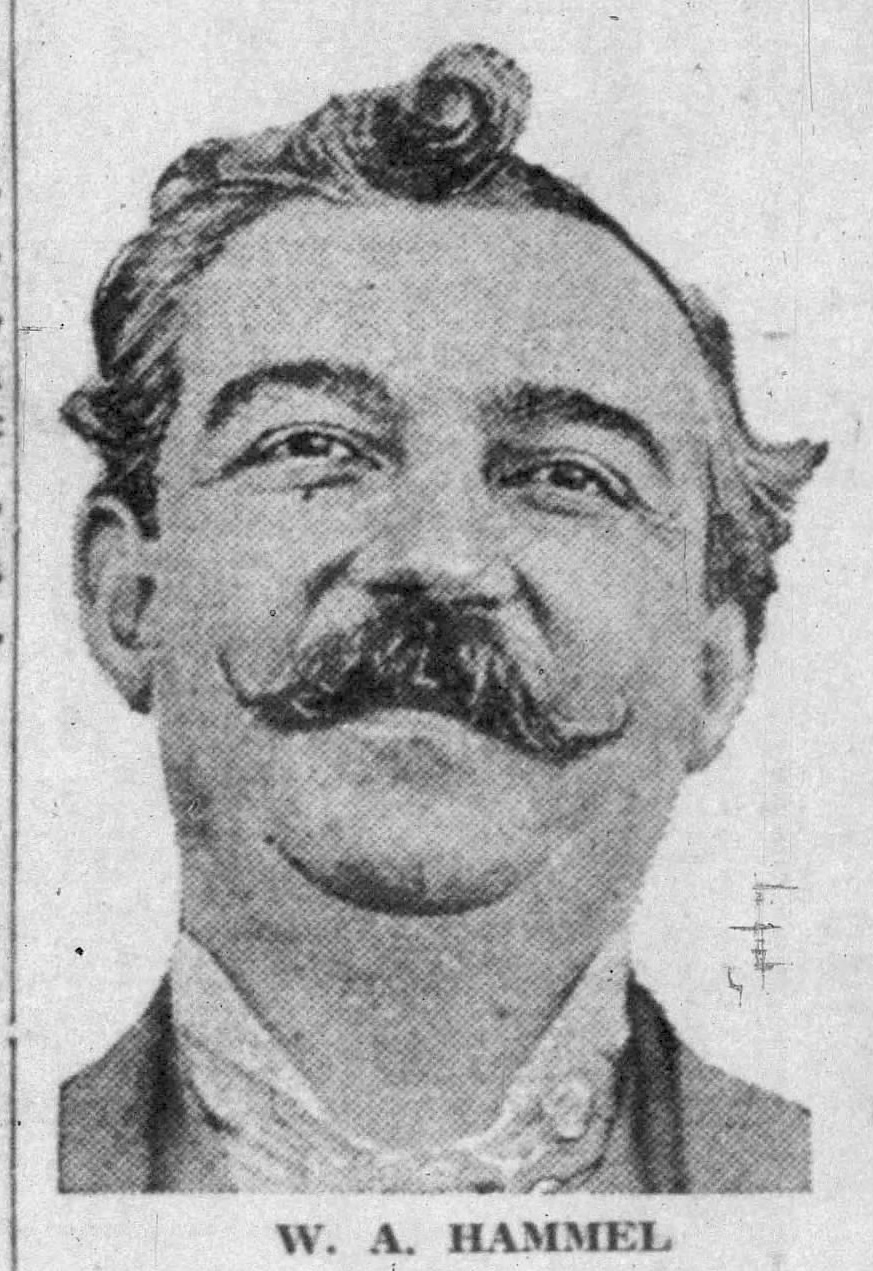
- Born: March 13, 1865; Los Angeles
- Died: January 1, 1932 (aged 66); Los Angeles
- Police career
- Country: United States
- Department: Los Angeles Police Department
- Rank: Chief of Police - 1904–1905

William "Billy" Augustus Hammel (March 13, 1865 – January 1, 1932) served as sheriff of Los Angeles County, California, from 1898 to 1902 and again from 1907 to 1914, and as chief of police of the Los Angeles Police Department for one year, six months, and 26 days in 1904–1905. He was hired to replace Charles Elton. Under Hammel, the LAPD used police automobiles for the first time. He also added a third local police station, following up Boyle Heights and Lincoln Heights divisions with a new building on Jefferson Blvd. He reportedly "survived many gun battles."

== Biography ==
Hammel was the son of a physician, Dr. William A. Hammel, who came to San Francisco in 1849 for the California gold rush. He was born in Los Angeles but was raised and went to school in the San Jose area, where he married Catherine McKiernan, daughter of a storied California mountain man. He went to college at Santa Clara University and lived in Arizona briefly before moving back to Los Angeles.

After a career as a grocery man, W. A. Hammel was first elected sheriff in 1898, serving a four-year term that ended with his defeat by William White. He was elected sheriff again in 1906. He was reportedly given "considerable credit" for arresting the brothers behind the 1910 Los Angeles Times bombing. He retired from law enforcement for good in 1913. At the time of his death one newspaper reported, "His most renowned exploit was when, singlehanded, he outrode a Mexican in a horse race to the border, shot it out with him and brought him, wounded, back to Los Angeles to face a trial for murder."

The Times still thought highly of him some 20 years later: "Mr. Hammel took a leading part In the fight against lawlessness and crime, and to his straight hitting and incorruptible honor the county of Los Angeles owes an eternal debt of gratitude."

The cause of death was heart attack. He was buried at Inglewood Park Cemetery. He was survived by a daughter who lived in Beverly Hills, Mrs. Phyllis Staley, wife of Gerald Staley.

== See also ==
- Chief of the Los Angeles Police Department § List of police chiefs
- List of Los Angeles County sheriffs

Police appointments
Preceded by Charles Elton	Chief of LAPD; 1904–1905	Succeeded by Walter H. Auble
