= List of United States Senate elections in California =

United States Senate elections in California occur when voters in the U.S. state of California select an individual to represent the state in the United States Senate in either of the state's two seats allotted by the Constitution. Regularly scheduled general elections occur on Election Day, coinciding with various other federal, statewide, and local races.

Each state is allotted two U.S. Senators elected to staggered six-year terms, which were originally selected by the state legislature. The Senate is divided into three classes to stagger the terms of its members such that one-third of the Senate would be up for re-election every two years. Upon California's admission to the Union in 1850, the state was assigned a Class 1 seat and a Class 3 seat, first elected in 1849. Since the passage of the Seventeenth Amendment in 1913, U.S. Senators are elected directly by the voters of each state. Special elections may be held to fill mid-term vacancies to elect an individual to serve the remainder of the unexpired term.

The list below contains results from all U.S. Senate elections held in California after the passage of the Seventeenth Amendment, sorted by year. The next scheduled election for the Class 1 seat is in 2030, while the Class 3 seat will hold its next election in 2028.

== List of recent elections ==
=== Class 1 ===
Year	Winner				Runner(s)-up				Others		Ref
Year	Candidate	Party	Votes	%	Candidate	Party	Votes	%	Votes	%	Ref
1916	Hiram Johnson	Republican (Note: Cross-nominated by the Progressive Party.)	574,667	61.09%	George S. Patton	Democratic	277,852	29.54%	38,797	4.12%	
1916	Hiram Johnson	Republican	574,667	61.09%	Walter Thomas Mills	Socialist	49,341	5.25%	38,797	4.12%	
1922	Hiram Johnson*	Republican	564,422	62.17%	William J. Pearson	Democratic	215,748	23.76%			
1922	Hiram Johnson*	Republican	564,422	62.17%	Henry Clay Needham	Prohibition	70,748	7.79%			
1922	Hiram Johnson*	Republican	564,422	62.17%	Upton Sinclair	Socialist	56,982	6.28%			
1928	Hiram Johnson*	Republican	1,148,397	74.11%	Minor Moore	Democratic	282,411	18.23%	26,624	1.72%	
1928	Hiram Johnson*	Republican	1,148,397	74.11%	Charles Hiram Randall	Prohibition	92,106	5.94%	26,624	1.72%	
1934	Hiram Johnson*	Republican (Note: Cross-nominated by the Democratic Party.)	1,946,572	94.66%	George Ross Kirkpatrick	Socialist	108,748	5.29%	1,025	0.05%	
1940	Hiram Johnson*	Republican (Note: Cross-nominated by the Democratic Party and the California Progressive Party.)	2,238,899	82.62%	Fred Dyster	Prohibition	366,044	13.51%	104,893	3.87%	
1946 (sp)	William Knowland*	Write-in	425,273	74.31%	Will Rogers Jr.	Write-in	90,723	15.85%	56,325	9.84%	
1946	William Knowland*	Republican	1,428,067	54.10%	Will Rogers Jr.	Democratic	1,167,161	44.22%	44,237	1.68%	
1952	William Knowland*	Republican	3,982,448	87.79%	Reuben W. Borough	Progressive	542,270	11.95%	11,812	0.26%	
1958	Clair Engle	Democratic	2,927,693	57.01%	Goodwin Knight	Republican	2,204,337	42.93%	3,191	0.06%	
1964	George Murphy	Republican	3,628,552	51.54%	Pierre Salinger*	Democratic	3,411,915	48.46%			
1970	John V. Tunney	Democratic	3,496,558	53.86%	George Murphy*	Republican	2,877,617	44.33%	117,982	1.81%	
1976	S. I. Hayakawa	Republican	3,748,973	50.17%	John V. Tunney*	Democratic	3,502,862	46.88%	220,433	2.95%	
1982	Pete Wilson	Republican	4,022,565	51.54%	Jerry Brown	Democratic	3,494,968	44.78%	288,005	3.68%	
1988	Pete Wilson*	Republican	5,143,409	52.79%	Leo T. McCarthy	Democratic	4,287,253	44.00%	312,939	3.21%	
1992 (sp)	Dianne Feinstein	Democratic	5,853,651	54.29%	John Seymour*	Republican	4,093,501	37.96%	835,591	7.75%	
1994	Dianne Feinstein*	Democratic	3,979,152	46.74%	Michael Huffington	Republican	3,817,025	44.83%	717,912	8.43%	
2000	Dianne Feinstein*	Democratic	5,932,522	55.84%	Tom Campbell	Republican	3,886,853	36.59%	804,239	7.57%	
2006	Dianne Feinstein*	Democratic	5,076,289	59.43%	Dick Mountjoy	Republican	2,990,822	35.02%	474,365	5.55%	
2012	Dianne Feinstein*	Democratic	7,864,624	62.52%	Elizabeth Emken	Republican	4,713,887	37.48%	N/A (Note: Since the passage of Proposition 14 in 2010, the general elections have been limited to only two candidates, with no write-in candidates allowed.)		
2018	Dianne Feinstein*	Democratic	6,019,422	54.16%	Kevin de León	Democratic	5,093,942	45.84%	N/A		
2024 (sp)	Adam Schiff	Democratic	8,837,051	58.75%	Steve Garvey	Republican	6,204,637	41.25%	N/A		
2024	Adam Schiff	Democratic	9,036,252	58.87%	Steve Garvey	Republican	6,312,594	41.13%	N/A		

County results of Class 1 elections since 2000

2000
Feinstein vs. Campbell

2006
Feinstein vs. Mountjoy

2012
Feinstein vs. Emken

2018
Feinstein vs. de León

2024
Schiff vs. Garvey

=== Class 3 ===
Year	Winner				Runner(s)-up				Others		Ref
Year	Candidate	Party	Votes	%	Candidate	Party	Votes	%	Votes	%	Ref
1914	James D. Phelan	Democratic	279,896	31.59%	Francis J. Heney	Progressive	255,232	28.81%	39,921	4.51%	
1914	James D. Phelan	Democratic	279,896	31.59%	Joseph R. Knowland	Republican	254,159	28.69%	39,921	4.51%	
1914	James D. Phelan	Democratic	279,896	31.59%	Ernest Untermann	Socialist	56,805	6.41%	39,921	4.51%	
1920	Samuel M. Shortridge	Republican	447,835	49.01%	James D. Phelan*	Democratic	371,580	40.67%	36,545	4.00%	
1920	Samuel M. Shortridge	Republican	447,835	49.01%	James S. Edwards	Prohibition	57,768	6.32%	36,545	4.00%	
1926	Samuel M. Shortridge*	Republican	670,128	63.12%	John B. Elliott	Democratic	391,599	36.88%			
1932	William Gibbs McAdoo	Democratic	943,164	43.39%	Tallant Tubbs	Republican	669,676	30.81%	906	0.03%	
1932	William Gibbs McAdoo	Democratic	943,164	43.39%	Robert P. Shuler	Prohibition	560,088	25.77%	906	0.03%	
1938	Sheridan Downey	Democratic (Note: Cross-nominated by the California Progressive Party and the Townsend Party.)	1,372,314	54.43%	Philip Bancroft	Republican	1,126,240	44.67%	22,569	0.90%	
1944	Sheridan Downey*	Democratic	1,728,155	52.29%	Frederick F. Houser	Republican (Note: Cross-nominated by the Prohibition Party.)	1,576,553	47.71%			
1950	Richard Nixon	Republican	2,183,454	59.23%	Helen Gahagan Douglas	Democratic	1,502,507	40.76%	354	0.01%	
1954 (sp)	Thomas Kuchel*	Republican	2,090,836	53.21%	Sam Yorty	Democratic	1,788,071	45.51%	50,506	1.29%	
1956	Thomas Kuchel*	Republican	2,892,918	53.96%	Richard Richards	Democratic	2,445,816	45.62%	22,410	0.42%	
1962	Thomas Kuchel*	Republican	3,180,483	56.33%	Richard Richards	Democratic	2,452,839	43.44%	12,941	0.23%	
1968	Alan Cranston	Democratic	3,680,352	51.82%	Max Rafferty	Republican	3,329,148	46.87%	92,965	1.31%	
1974	Alan Cranston*	Democratic	3,693,160	60.52%	H. L. Richardson	Republican	2,210,267	36.22%	199,005	3.26%	
1980	Alan Cranston*	Democratic	4,705,399	56.50%	Paul Gann	Republican	3,093,426	37.15%	528,657	6.35%	
1986	Alan Cranston*	Democratic	3,646,672	49.29%	Ed Zschau	Republican	3,541,804	47.87%	210,073	2.84%	
1992	Barbara Boxer	Democratic	5,173,467	47.90%	Bruce Herschensohn	Republican	4,644,182	43.00%	982,054	9.10%	
1998	Barbara Boxer*	Democratic	4,411,705	53.06%	Matt Fong	Republican	3,576,351	43.01%	326,897	3.93%	
2004	Barbara Boxer*	Democratic	6,955,728	57.71%	Bill Jones	Republican	4,555,922	37.80%	541,643	7.49%	
2010	Barbara Boxer*	Democratic	5,218,441	52.18%	Carly Fiorina	Republican	4,217,366	42.17%	564,353	5.65%	
2016	Kamala Harris	Democratic	7,542,753	61.60%	Loretta Sanchez	Democratic	4,701,417	38.40%	N/A		
2022 (sp)	Alex Padilla*	Democratic	6,559,303	60.89%	Mark Meuser	Republican	4,212,446	39.11%	N/A		
2022	Alex Padilla*	Democratic	6,621,616	61.06%	Mark Meuser	Republican	4,222,025	38.94%	N/A		

County results of Class 3 elections since 2004

2004
Boxer vs. Jones

2010
Boxer vs. Fiorina

2016
Harris vs. Sanchez

2022
Padilla vs. Meuser

== See also ==
- List of United States senators from California
- List of United States presidential elections in California
- Elections in California
