= Dargie =

Dargie is a Scottish surname. Notable people with the surname include:

- Horrie Dargie (1917–1999), Australian musician
- Ian Dargie (born 1963), Australian rules footballer
- Ian Dargie (footballer, born 1931), English footballer
- Paul Dargie, American politician
- William Dargie (1912–2003), Australian painter
- William E. Dargie (1854–1911), American newspaper publisher and politician
