= Bruno Albert Forsterer =

United States Marine Corps Medal of Honor recipient (1869–1957)

- Bruno Albert Forsterer
- Born: July 14, 1869; Königsberg, Prussia
- Died: June 13, 1957 (aged 87); Oakland, California, U.S.
- Burial place: Arlington National Cemetery
- Military career
- Allegiance: United States
- Branch: United States Marine Corps
- Service years: 1896–1909
- Rank: Sergeant
- Units: Marine Guard, USS Philadelphia (C-4)
- Conflicts: Samoan Civil War
- Awards: Medal of Honor
- Other work: Oakland Tribune publisher and editor

Bruno Albert Forsterer (July 14, 1869 – June 13, 1957) was a United States Marine Corps sergeant and recipient of the Medal of Honor. He received the decoration for his actions during the Samoan Civil War at Samoa on April 1, 1899, while serving with the Marine Guard aboard USS Philadelphia (C-4).

Forsterer enlisted in the Marine Corps in Boston on November 3, 1896, and was honorably discharged on November 2, 1909. He was buried at Arlington National Cemetery.

== Medal of Honor citation ==
Rank and organization: Sergeant, U.S. Marine Corps. Born: July 14, 1869, Koenigsberg, Germany. Accredited to: Massachusetts. G.O. No.: 55, July 19, 1901.

Citation:

For distinguished conduct in the presence of the enemy at Samoa, Philippine Islands, 1 April 1899.

== After the war ==
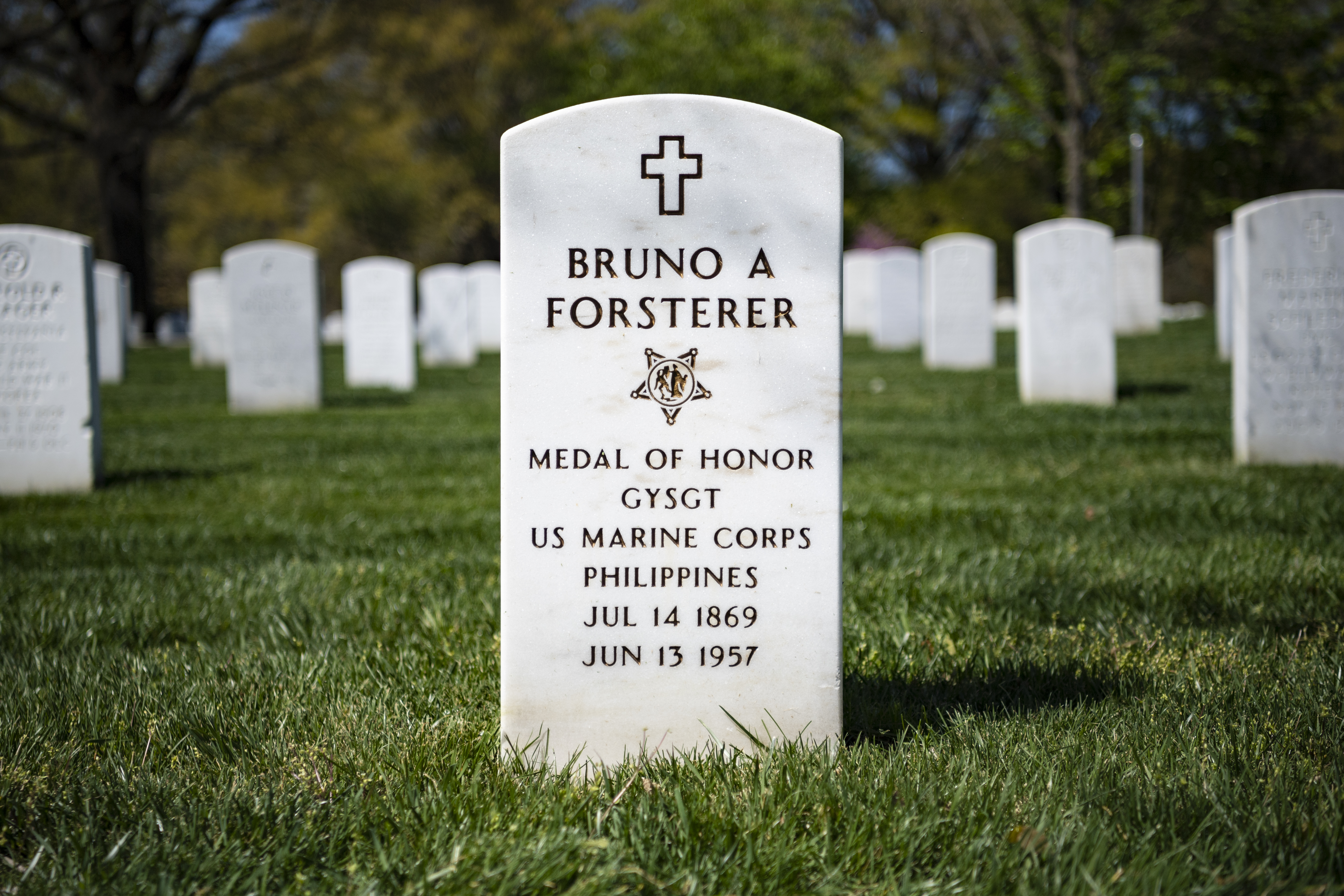
Forsterer's grave at Arlington National Cemetery

William E. Dargie appointed Bruno Forsterer general manager of the Oakland Tribune. Upon Dargie's death on February 10, 1911, Forsterer succeeded Dargie as the publisher of the paper (1911–1915). Forsterer also served as the executor for the Dargie's will. Forsterer would serve new Tribune owner, (former U.S. Congressman) Joseph R. Knowland as Business Manager of the Oakland Tribune, (1915–1957).

In 1936, Joseph Knowland, Bruno Forsterer and Joseph Blum founded the Franklin Investment Company (later, the Franklin Credit Union). His son, Harold B. Forsterer (1900–1974) served as Secretary-Treasurer of the Oakland Tribune (1957–1965). he died on June 13 1957.

Bruno Forsterer is buried in Arlington National Cemetery. His grave is located in section 53, Lot 2757.

== See also ==
- List of Medal of Honor recipients
