= 1900 United States presidential election in California =

- November 6, 1900
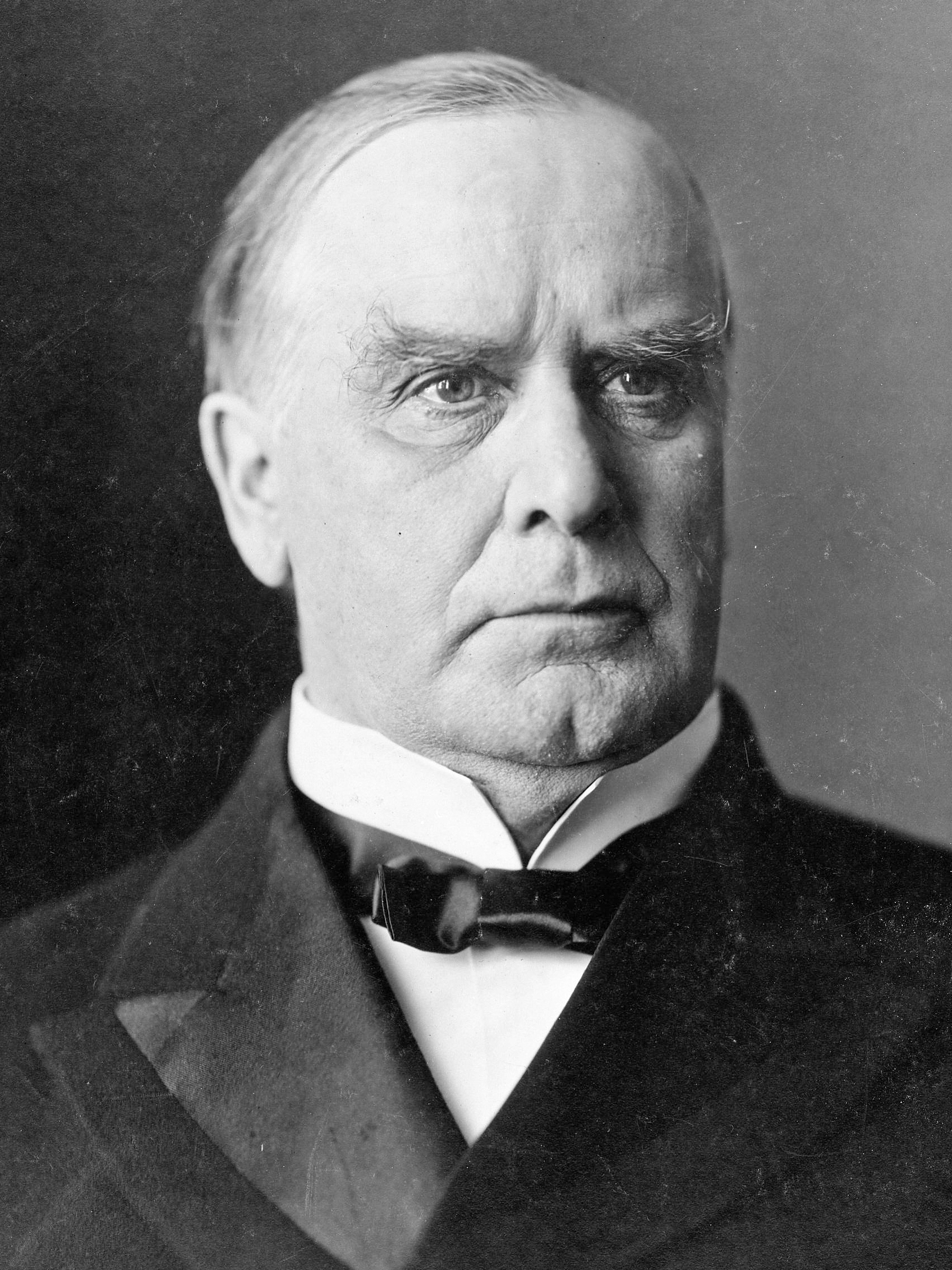

Nominee	William McKinley	William Jennings Bryan
Party	Republican	Democratic
Home state	Ohio	Nebraska
Running mate	Theodore Roosevelt	Adlai E. Stevenson
Electoral vote	9	0
Popular vote	164,755	124,985
Percentage	54.50%	41.34%
County results
McKinley
40–50%
50–60%
60–70%
80–90%
Bryan
40–50%
50–60%

The 1900 United States presidential election in California took place on November 6, 1900, as part of the 1900 United States presidential election. State voters chose nine representatives, or electors, to the Electoral College, who voted for president and vice president.

California voted for the Republican nominee, President William McKinley, over the Democratic nominee, former U.S. Representative and 1896 Democratic presidential nominee William Jennings Bryan. McKinley won the state by a margin of 13.16% in this rematch of the 1896 presidential election. After a series of close elections in the state, this was the first time since 1872 that a candidate won California by double digits. The return of economic prosperity and recent victory in the Spanish–American War helped McKinley to score a decisive victory. McKinley flipped 15 counties, including Mendocino County, which to that point had never voted for a Republican candidate. This election was also the first time since 1872 that a Republican carried Amador County, Siskiyou County, and Tehama County.

Bryan had previously lost California to McKinley four years earlier and would later lose the state again in 1908 to William Howard Taft.

== Results ==
General Election Results
Party	Pledged to	Elector	Votes
Republican Party	William McKinley	Samuel M. Shortridge	164,755
Republican Party	William McKinley	Irving M. Scott	164,755
Republican Party	William McKinley	William J. Barrett	164,006
Republican Party	William McKinley	William R. Davis	163,791
Republican Party	William McKinley	John Walter Ryan	163,603
Republican Party	William McKinley	Harold T. Power	163,590
Republican Party	William McKinley	Frank McGowan	163,527
Republican Party	William McKinley	Christian B. Rode	163,445
Republican Party	William McKinley	Warren R. Porter	163,148
Republican Party	William McKinley	James McFadden	161,917
Democratic Party	William Jennings Bryan	J. H. Seawell	124,985
Democratic Party	William Jennings Bryan	J. P. Haynes	124,858
Democratic Party	William Jennings Bryan	James N. Block	124,770
Democratic Party	William Jennings Bryan	Willard H. Stimson	124,756
Democratic Party	William Jennings Bryan	W. R. Jacobs	124,742
Democratic Party	William Jennings Bryan	W. R. Prather	124,723
Democratic Party	William Jennings Bryan	W. T. Baggett	124,689
Democratic Party	William Jennings Bryan	Thomas A. Rice	124,666
Democratic Party	William Jennings Bryan	John A. Cole	123,634
Social Democratic Party	Eugene V. Debs	E. M. Dewey	7,572
Social Democratic Party	Eugene V. Debs	Lemuel D. Biddle	7,554
Social Democratic Party	Eugene V. Debs	William Main	7,504
Social Democratic Party	Eugene V. Debs	Frank Reed	7,487
Social Democratic Party	Eugene V. Debs	John M. Reynolds	7,470
Social Democratic Party	Eugene V. Debs	H. Haunch	7,452
Social Democratic Party	Eugene V. Debs	Olaus Gafvert	7,451
Social Democratic Party	Eugene V. Debs	A. J. Stevens	7,442
Social Democratic Party	Eugene V. Debs	E. M. Anthony	7,435
Prohibition Party	John G. Woolley	William Kelly	5,087
Prohibition Party	John G. Woolley	J. H. Blanchard	5,024
Prohibition Party	John G. Woolley	Volney Taylor	4,978
Prohibition Party	John G. Woolley	Leroy S. Atwood	4,958
Prohibition Party	John G. Woolley	M. C. Winchester	4,956
Prohibition Party	John G. Woolley	J. W. Webb	4,953
Prohibition Party	John G. Woolley	L. A. Goble	4,941
Prohibition Party	John G. Woolley	N. Morcum	4,927
Prohibition Party	John G. Woolley	S. Bristol	4,926
Write-in		Scattering	605
Votes cast (Note: Based on totals for highest elector on each ticket)			303,004

=== Results by county ===
County	William McKinley Republican		William Jennings Bryan Democratic		Eugene V. Debs Social Democratic		John G. Woolley Prohibition		Scattering Write-in		Margin		Total votes cast (Note: Based on the highest elector on each ticket)
County	#	%	#	%	#	%	#	%	#	%	#	%	Total votes cast
Alameda	14,324	64.64%	6,677	30.13%	817	3.69%	341	1.54%	0	0.00%	7,647	34.51%	22,159
Alpine	69	82.14%	15	17.86%	0	0.00%	0	0.00%	0	0.00%	54	64.29%	84
Amador	1,384	52.64%	1,209	45.99%	17	0.65%	19	0.72%	0	0.00%	175	6.66%	2,629
Butte	2,322	52.55%	2,011	45.51%	49	1.11%	37	0.84%	0	0.00%	311	7.04%	4,419
Calaveras	1,600	54.59%	1,288	43.94%	29	0.99%	14	0.48%	0	0.00%	312	10.64%	2,931
Colusa	648	35.98%	1,075	59.69%	65	3.61%	13	0.72%	0	0.00%	-427	-23.71%	1,801
Contra Costa	2,165	57.02%	1,549	40.80%	44	1.16%	39	1.03%	0	0.00%	616	16.22%	3,797
Del Norte	334	51.78%	291	45.12%	12	1.86%	8	1.24%	0	0.00%	43	6.67%	645
El Dorado	1,193	45.14%	1,406	53.20%	25	0.95%	19	0.72%	0	0.00%	-213	-8.06%	2,643
Fresno	3,585	47.34%	3,590	47.41%	231	3.05%	167	2.21%	0	0.00%	-5	-0.07%	7,573
Glenn	494	39.49%	737	58.91%	5	0.40%	14	1.12%	1	0.08%	-243	-19.42%	1,251
Humboldt	3,902	66.32%	1,698	28.86%	179	3.04%	105	1.78%	0	0.00%	2,204	37.46%	5,884
Inyo	396	42.35%	505	54.01%	20	2.14%	14	1.50%	0	0.00%	-109	-11.66%	935
Kern	1,692	45.17%	1,960	52.32%	54	1.44%	29	0.77%	11	0.29%	-268	-7.15%	3,746
Kings	1,032	51.76%	872	43.73%	42	2.11%	47	2.36%	1	0.05%	160	8.02%	1,994
Lake	584	41.45%	746	52.95%	28	1.99%	51	3.62%	0	0.00%	-162	-11.50%	1,409
Lassen	549	58.10%	326	34.50%	64	6.77%	6	0.63%	0	0.00%	223	23.60%	945
Los Angeles	19,200	55.10%	13,158	37.76%	991	2.84%	1,416	4.06%	83	0.24%	6,042	17.34%	34,848
Madera	764	49.58%	737	47.83%	19	1.23%	20	1.30%	1	0.06%	27	1.75%	1,541
Marin	1,681	63.58%	904	34.19%	50	1.89%	9	0.34%	0	0.00%	777	29.39%	2,644
Mariposa	505	40.79%	717	57.92%	8	0.65%	8	0.65%	0	0.00%	-212	-17.12%	1,238
Mendocino	2,192	53.15%	1,861	45.13%	38	0.92%	33	0.80%	0	0.00%	331	8.03%	4,124
Merced	811	41.59%	1.081	55.44%	24	1.23%	34	1.74%	0	0.00%	-270	-13.85%	1,950
Modoc	446	44.78%	532	53.41%	11	1.10%	7	0.70%	0	0.00%	-86	-8.63%	996
Mono	284	52.11%	258	47.34%	1	0.18%	2	0.37%	0	0.00%	26	4.77%	545
Monterey	1,964	50.10%	1,825	46.56%	49	1.25%	82	2.09%	0	0.00%	139	3.55%	3,920
Napa	2,017	56.71%	1,432	40.26%	52	1.46%	54	1.52%	2	0.06%	585	16.45%	3,557
Nevada	2,449	55.91%	1,758	40.14%	128	2.92%	44	1.00%	1	0.02%	691	15.78%	4,380
Orange	2,155	51.24%	1,777	42.25%	77	1.83%	196	4.66%	1	0.02%	378	8.99%	4,206
Placer	2,009	54.64%	1,592	43.30%	40	1.09%	36	0.98%	0	0.00%	417	11.34%	3,677
Plumas	640	58.45%	442	40.37%	8	0.73%	5	0.46%	0	0.00%	198	18.08%	1,095
Riverside	2,329	61.14%	1,134	29.77%	155	4.07%	190	4.99%	1	0.03%	1,195	31.37%	3,809
Sacramento	5,506	54.78%	4,325	43.03%	127	1.26%	92	0.92%	1	0.01%	1,181	11.75%	10,051
San Benito	724	46.71%	786	50.71%	16	1.03%	21	1.35%	3	0.19%	-62	-4.00%	1,550
San Bernardino	3,135	52.15%	2,347	39.05%	233	3.88%	293	4.87%	3	0.05%	788	13.11%	6,011
San Diego	3,800	54.91%	2,678	38.69%	289	4.18%	152	2.20%	2	0.03%	1,122	16.21%	6,921
San Francisco	35,208	55.71%	25,212	39.89%	2,030	3.21%	275	0.44%	477	0.75%	9,996	15.82%	63,202
San Joaquin	3,318	52.01%	2,873	45.04%	94	1.47%	83	1.30%	11	0.17%	445	6.98%	6,379
San Luis Obispo	1,564	45.81%	1,713	50.18%	60	1.76%	73	2.14%	4	0.12%	-149	-4.36%	3,414
San Mateo	1,645	63.00%	914	35.01%	37	1.42%	15	0.57%	0	0.00%	731	28.00%	2,611
Santa Barbara	1,988	52.58%	1,599	42.29%	125	3.31%	69	1.82%	0	0.00%	389	10.29%	3,781
Santa Clara	7,107	58.25%	4,607	37.76%	218	1.79%	268	2.20%	0	0.00%	2,500	20.49%	12,200
Santa Cruz	2,173	53.19%	1,635	40.02%	154	3.77%	122	2.99%	1	0.02%	538	13.17%	4,085
Shasta	1,681	44.70%	1,948	51.79%	85	2.26%	47	1.25%	0	0.00%	-267	-7.10%	3,761
Sierra	702	60.99%	436	37.88%	10	0.87%	3	0.26%	0	0.00%	266	23.11%	1,151
Siskiyou	1,898	52.36%	1,668	46.01%	40	1.10%	19	0.52%	0	0.00%	230	6.34%	3,625
Solano	3,114	55.36%	2,262	40.21%	162	2.88%	87	1.55%	0	0.00%	852	15.15%	5,625
Sonoma	4,381	54.04%	3,517	43.38%	136	1.68%	73	0.90%	0	0.00%	864	10.66%	8,107
Stanislaus	1,058	43.81%	1,270	52.59%	37	1.53%	50	2.07%	0	0.00%	-212	-8.78%	2,415
Sutter	819	54.93%	642	43.06%	11	0.74%	19	1.27%	0	0.00%	177	11.87%	1,491
Tehama	1,210	50.35%	1,138	47.36%	27	1.12%	28	1.17%	0	0.00%	72	3.00%	2,403
Trinity	544	52.36%	485	46.68%	8	0.77%	2	0.19%	0	0.00%	59	5.68%	1,039
Tulare	1,755	41.41%	2,246	53.00%	166	3.92%	71	1.68%	0	0.00%	-491	-11.59%	4,238
Tuolumne	1,309	45.09%	1,530	52.70%	32	1.10%	32	1.10%	0	0.00%	-221	-7.61%	2,903
Ventura	1,708	53.54%	1,333	41.79%	77	2.41%	72	2.26%	0	0.00%	375	11.76%	3,190
Yolo	1,510	45.81%	1,687	51.18%	45	1.37%	53	1.61%	1	0.03%	-177	-5.37%	3,296
Yuba	1,179	54.08%	971	44.54%	21	0.96%	9	0.41%	0	0.00%	208	9.54%	2,180
Total	164,755	54.37%	124,985	41.25%	7,572	2.50%	5,087	1.68%	605	0.20%	39,770	13.13%	303,004

==== Counties that flipped from Democratic to Republican ====
- Amador
- Butte
- Kings
- Lassen
- Madera
- Mendocino
- Mono
- Monterey
- Nevada
- Sacramento
- San Diego
- San Joaquin (previously tied)
- Siskiyou
- Tehama
- Trinity

== See also ==
- United States presidential elections in California
