= 1896 San Francisco mayoral election =

- November 3, 1896
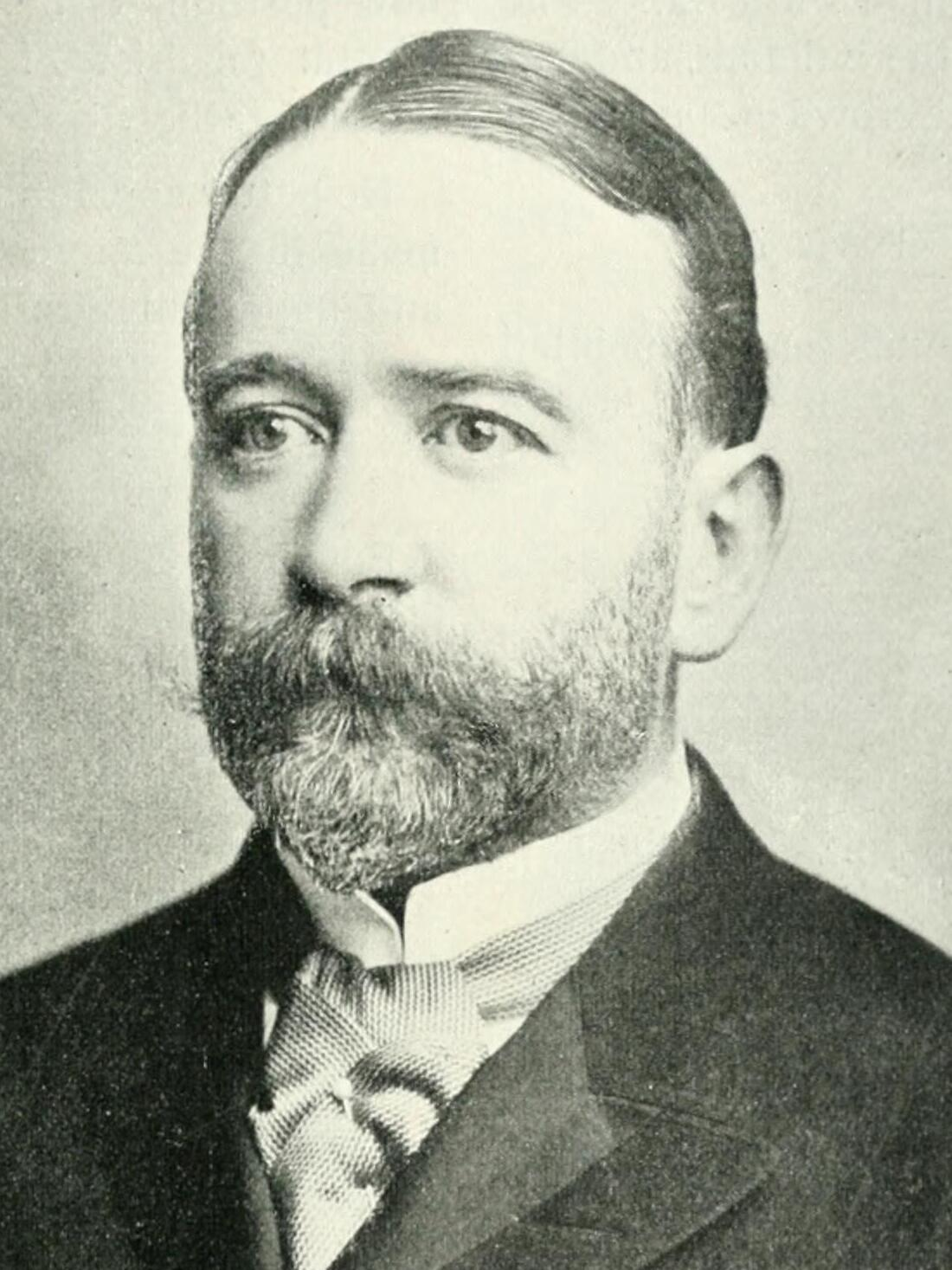

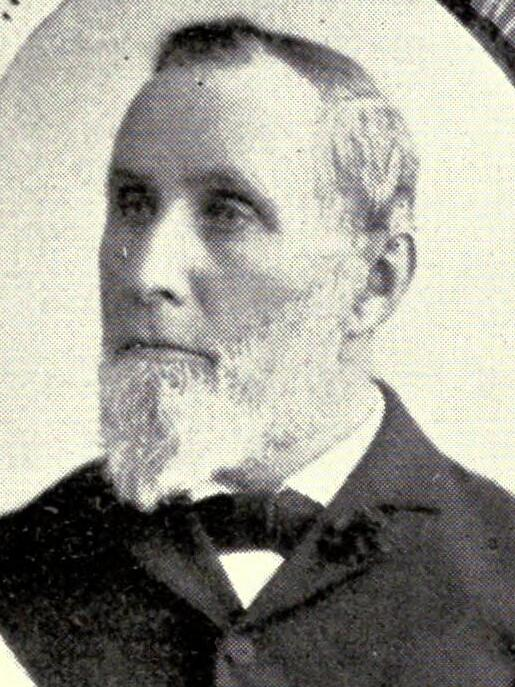

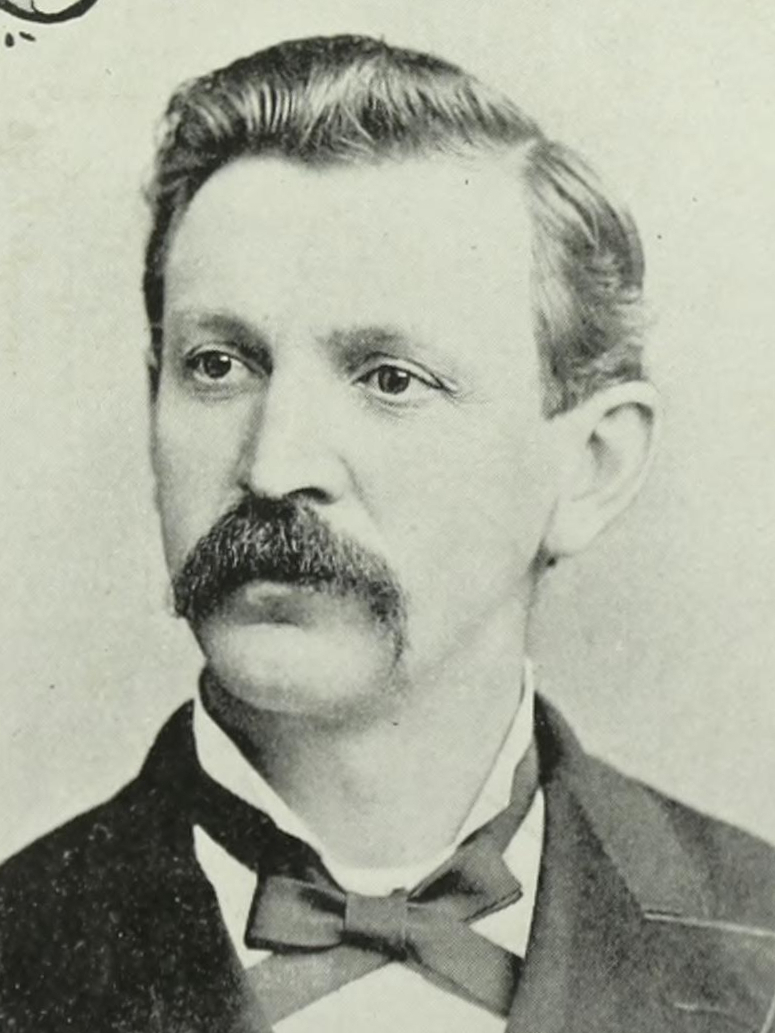

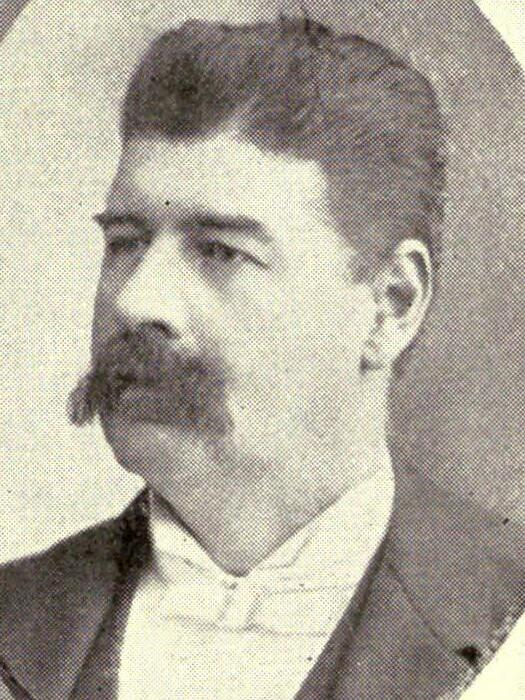
Candidate	James D. Phelan	Charles L. Taylor
Party	Democratic	Republican
Popular vote	28,714	20,570
Percentage	46.02%	32.96%
Candidate	Charles S. Laumeister	Joseph I. Dimond
Party	Republican	Democratic
Alliance		Populist
Popular vote	7,038	3,388
Percentage	11.28%	5.43%
Mayor before election
Adolph Sutro
Populist
Elected Mayor
James D. Phelan
Democratic

The 1896 San Francisco mayoral election was held on November 3, 1896. Regular Democrat James D. Phelan was elected with 46% of the vote, defeating split Republicans Charles L. Taylor and Charles S. Laumeister, Anti-Charter "Buckley Democratic"-Populist Joseph I. Dimond, Independent C. C. O'Donnell and Socialist Laborite Oliver Everett.

== Results ==
1896 San Francisco mayoral election
Party	Candidate	Votes	%
Democratic	James D. Phelan	28,714	46.02%
Republican	Charles L. Taylor	20,570	32.96%
Republican	Charles S. Laumeister	7,038	11.28%
Democratic	Joseph I. Dimond	3,388	5.43%
Independent	C. C. O'Donnell	1,732	2.78%
Socialist Labor	Oliver Everett	958	1.54%
Total votes		62,400	100.00
Democratic gain from Populist			
