= 1920 United States Senate election in California =

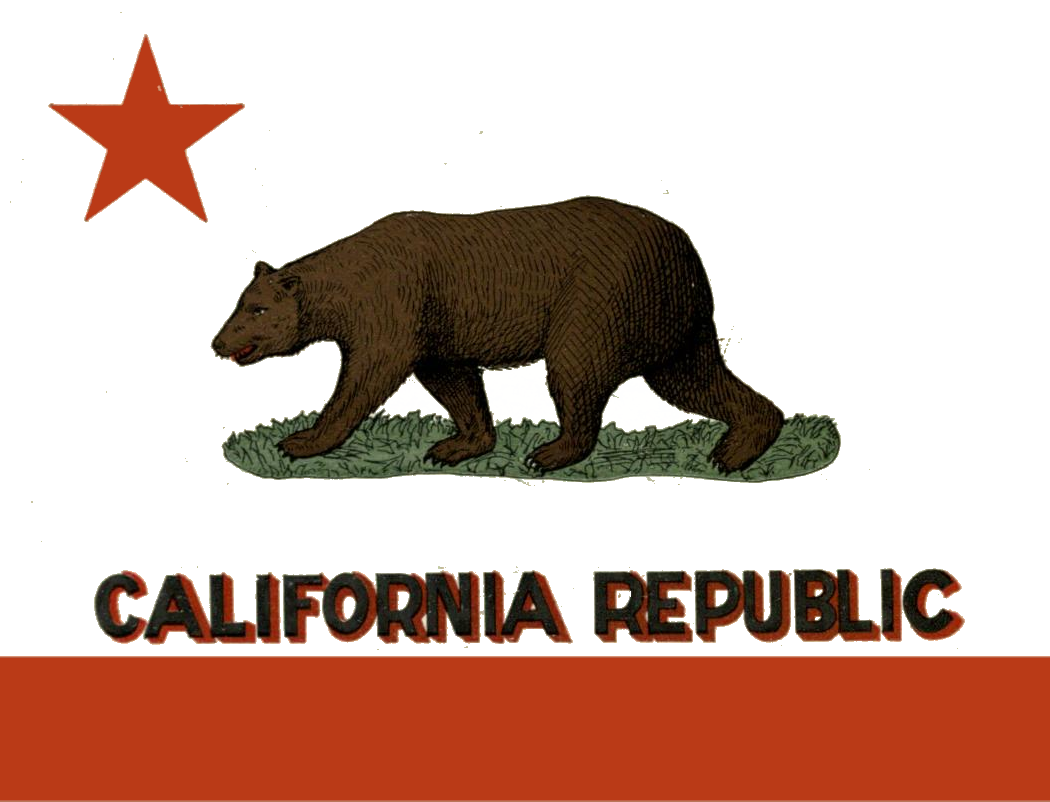
- November 6, 1920
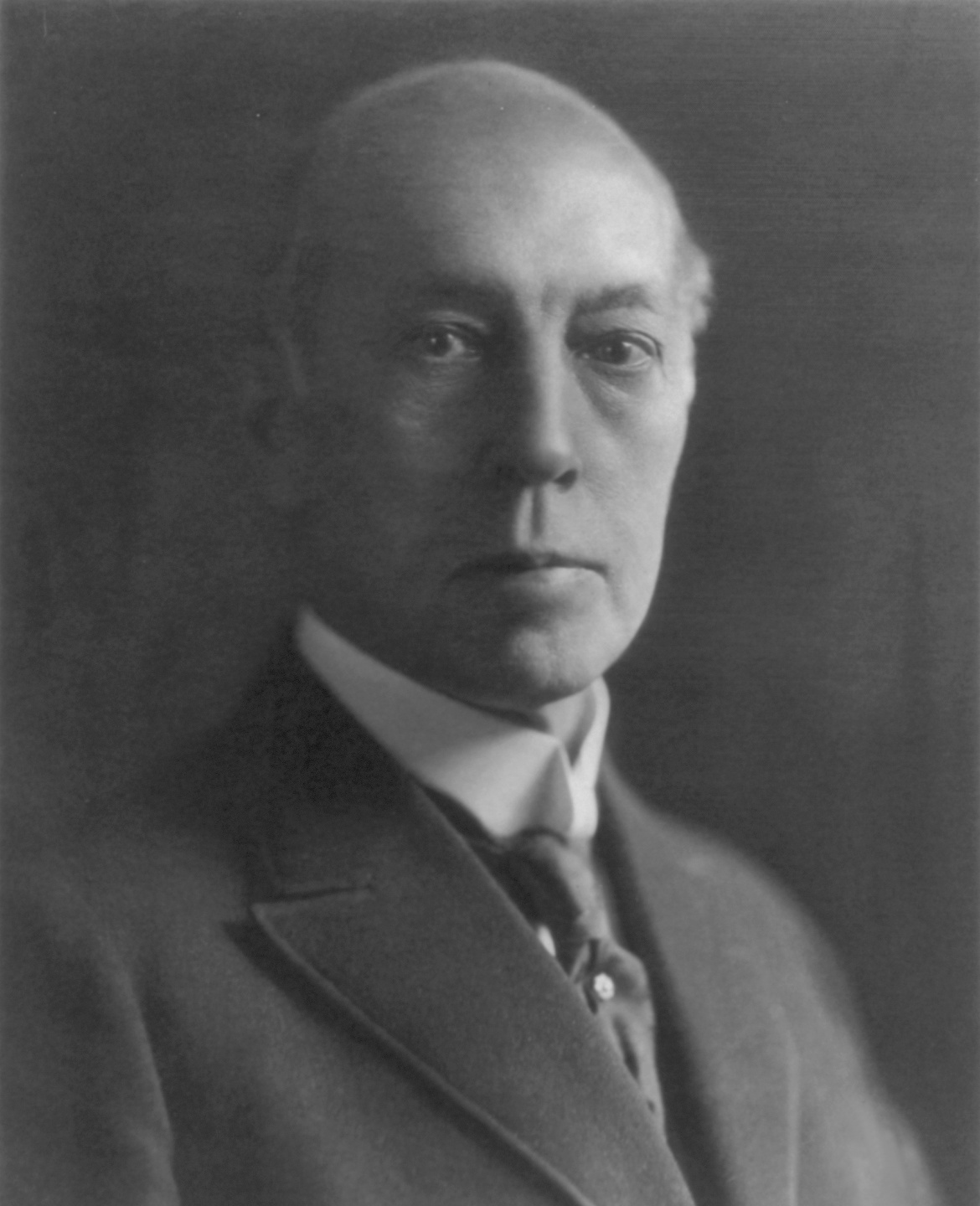

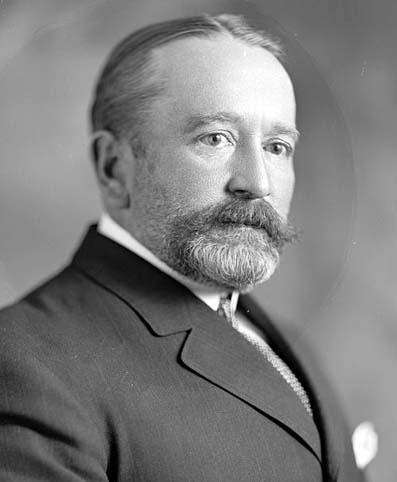

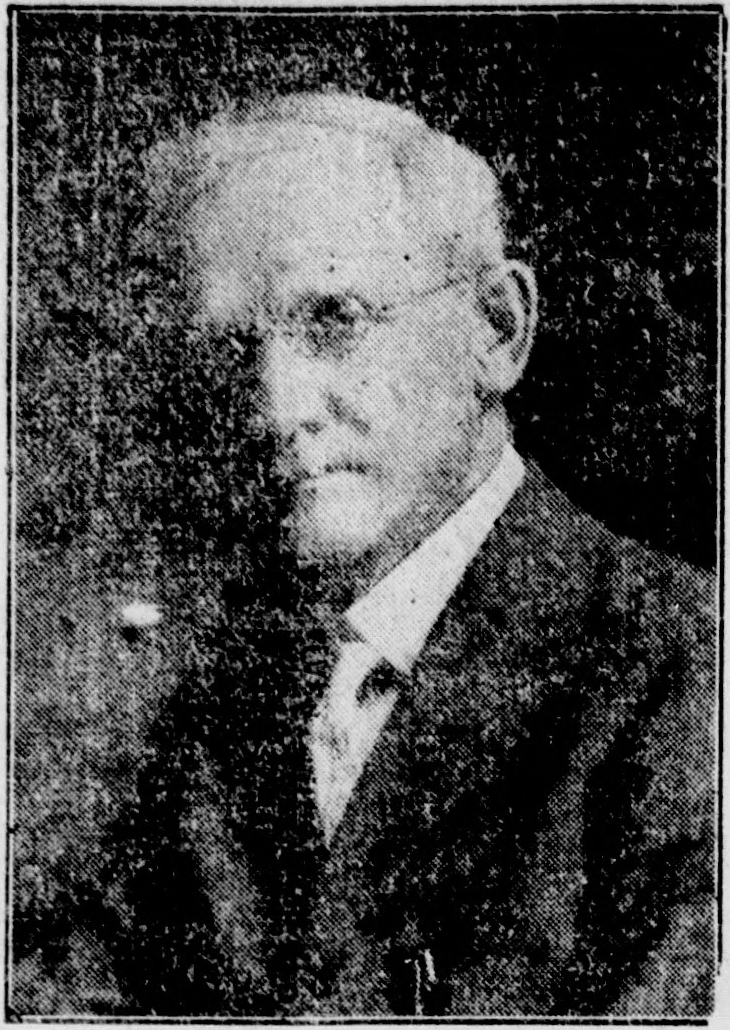
Nominee	Samuel Morgan Shortridge	James Duval Phelan	James S. Edwards
Party	Republican	Democratic	Prohibition
Popular vote	447,835	371,580	57,768
Percentage	49.01%	40.67%	6.32%
- County results Shortridge: 40–50% 50–60% 60–70% 80–90% Phelan: 40–50% 50–60% 60–70%
U.S. senator before election
James Duval Phelan
Democratic
Elected U.S. Senator
Samuel Morgan Shortridge
Republican

The 1920 United States Senate election in California was held on November 6, 1920. Incumbent Democratic Senator James Duval Phelan ran for re-election but was defeated by Republican attorney Samuel Morgan Shortridge.

== Republican primary ==
=== Candidates ===
- William Kent, U.S. Representative from Marin County
- Samuel Morgan Shortridge, attorney and candidate for Senate in 1914
- Albert Joseph Wallace, Lieutenant Governor

=== Results ===
1920 Republican Senate primary
Party	Candidate	Votes	%
Republican	Samuel Morgan Shortridge	132,165	40.40%
Republican	William Kent	110,269	33.71%
Republican	Albert Joseph Wallace	84,711	25.89%
Total votes		327,145	100.00%

== General election ==
=== Candidates ===
- Elvina S. Beals (Socialist), nominee for Lt. Governor in 1918
- James S. Edwards (Prohibition), nominee for Secretary of State in 1920 and Congress in 1910, 1914, and 1916
- James Duval Phelan (Democratic), incumbent Senator
- Samuel Morgan Shortridge (Republican), attorney and candidate for Senate in 1914

=== Results ===
1920 United States Senate election in California
Party	Candidate	Votes	%
Republican	Samuel Morgan Shortridge	447,835	49.01%
Democratic	James Duval Phelan (incumbent)	371,580	40.67%
Prohibition	James S. Edwards	57,768	6.32%
Socialist	Elvina S. Beals	36,545	4.00%
Total votes		886,013	100.00%

== See also ==
- 1920 United States Senate elections
