= Joseph R. Knowland =

American politician and newspaper publisher (1873–1966)

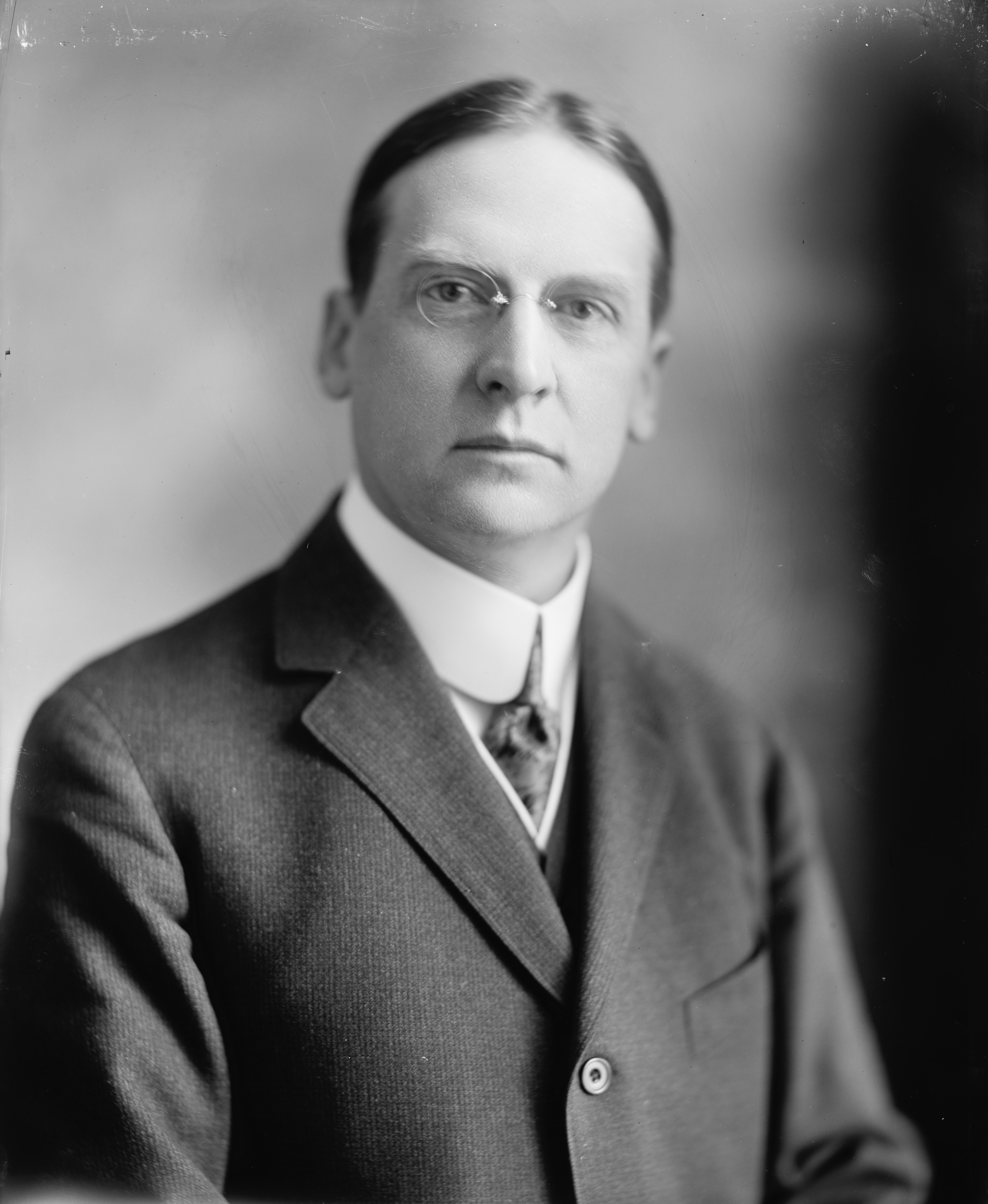
- Portrait by Harris & Ewing c. 1905–1915

Member of the U.S. House of Representatives from California
- In office November 8, 1904 – March 3, 1915
- Preceded by: Victor H. Metcalf
- Succeeded by: John A. Elston
- Constituency: 3rd district (1904–1913); 6th district (1913–1915)

Member of the California Senate from the 14th district
- In office January 5, 1903 – September 28, 1904
- Preceded by: John F. Davis
- Succeeded by: M. W. Simpson

Member of the California State Assembly from the 47th district
- In office January 2, 1899 – January 5, 1903
- Preceded by: James A. Waymire
- Succeeded by: Joseph Clement Bates Jr.

Personal details
- Born: August 5, 1873 Alameda, California, US
- Died: February 1, 1966 (aged 92) Piedmont, California, US
- Resting place: Chapel of Memories, Mountain View Cemetery in Oakland, California
- Party: Republican
- Spouse(s): Elinor J. Fife (m.1894–1908); Emelyn S. West (m.1909–1950); Clarice E. Cook (m.1952–1966)
- Children: 3, including William F. Knowland
- Education: University of the Pacific
- Occupation: Newspaper publisher

Joseph Russell Knowland (August 5, 1873 – February 1, 1966) was an American politician and newspaper publisher. He served six terms as a member of the United States House of Representatives from California from 1904 to 1915. He was the owner, editor and publisher of the Oakland Tribune. He was the father of United States Senator William F. Knowland.

== Early life ==
Knowland was born in Alameda, California on August 5, 1873, the son of Joseph Knowland (1833–1912) and Hannah Bailey Russell (1832–1921). His siblings included two sisters, Sadie (1864–1905) and Lucille (1870–1926), and a brother, Hollis, who died in infancy. Knowland attended Alameda Park Street Primary School and Hopkins Academy, and graduated from the University of the Pacific in 1895.

== Start of career ==
After college, Knowland joined his father's wholesale lumber and shipping business. His business career proved successful, and ventures in which Knowland participated included: Gardiner Mill Company (president); Kennedy Mine & Milling Company (director); Alameda National Bank (director); and Union Savings Bank of Oakland (director).

He was also active in several fraternal and civic organizations, to include the Freemasons, Shriners, Elks, Modern Woodmen of America, Native Sons of the Golden West, and California Historic Landmarks League. Knowland's memberships also included the California Centennials Council, California Historical Society, California Chamber of Commerce, California State Automobile Association, Oakland Chamber of Commerce, Oakland Community Chest, Mills College Board of Trustees, Oakland National Horse Show, and Athens Athletic Club.

== Political career ==
=== California Assembly ===
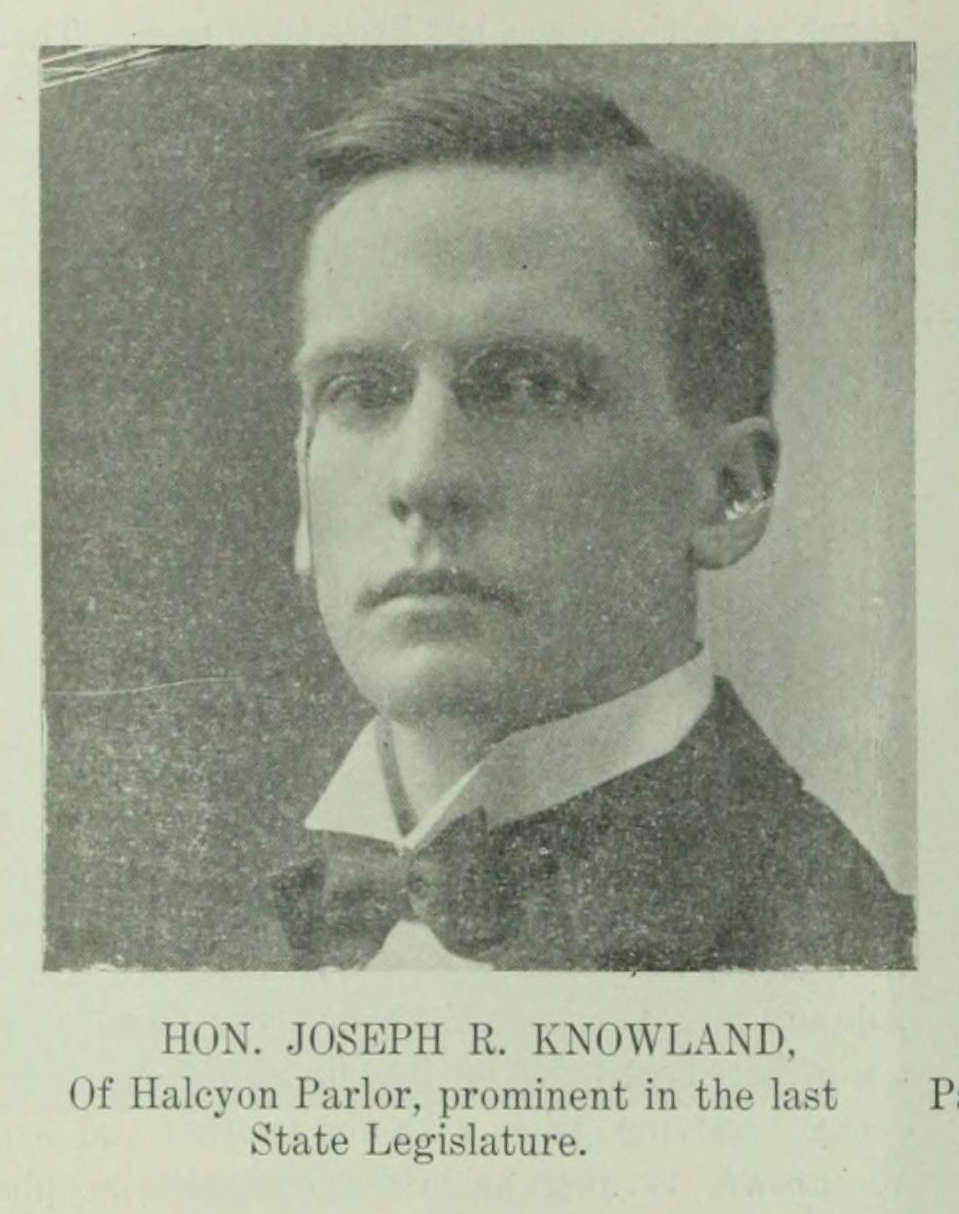
Knowland c. 1901

Knowland joined the Alameda Good Government Club in early 1895. In 1896, he was appointed to the Alameda Library Board of Trustees. In 1898, he was a successful Republican candidate for the California State Assembly. He was reelected in 1900, and served from 1899 to 1903. During his Assembly career, Knowland chaired the Assembly committee that investigated the corruption in the San Francisco police. His efforts resulted in passage of a law prohibiting the human trafficking of Chinese women.

=== California Senate ===
In 1902, Knowland was elected to the California State Senate. He served until resigning in order to take the seat in the United States House of Representatives to which he had been elected in 1904. During Knowland's Senate term, he was chairman of the body's committee on banking.

=== Member of Congress ===
In 1904, Knowland was elected to Congress in a special election, filling the vacancy caused by the resignation of Victor H. Metcalf. He was reelected to five full terms and served from September 24, 1904, to March 3, 1915. His district included the U.S. Army's Benicia Arsenal and the U.S. Naval Shipyard at Mare Island, so Knowland had a keen interest in the military. As a congressman, he worked to obtain approval for construction of Navy capital ships in California and for a two-ocean fleet. In addition, Knowland advocated for American ships to use the Panama Canal toll free.

Knowland sought to succeed George C. Perkins in the U.S. Senate. In 1914, he won the Republican primary over Samuel M. Shortridge. However, he was unsuccessful in the general election, a three-way race with Francis J. Heney of the Progressive Party and the winner, Democrat James D. Phelan.

== The Oakland Tribune ==
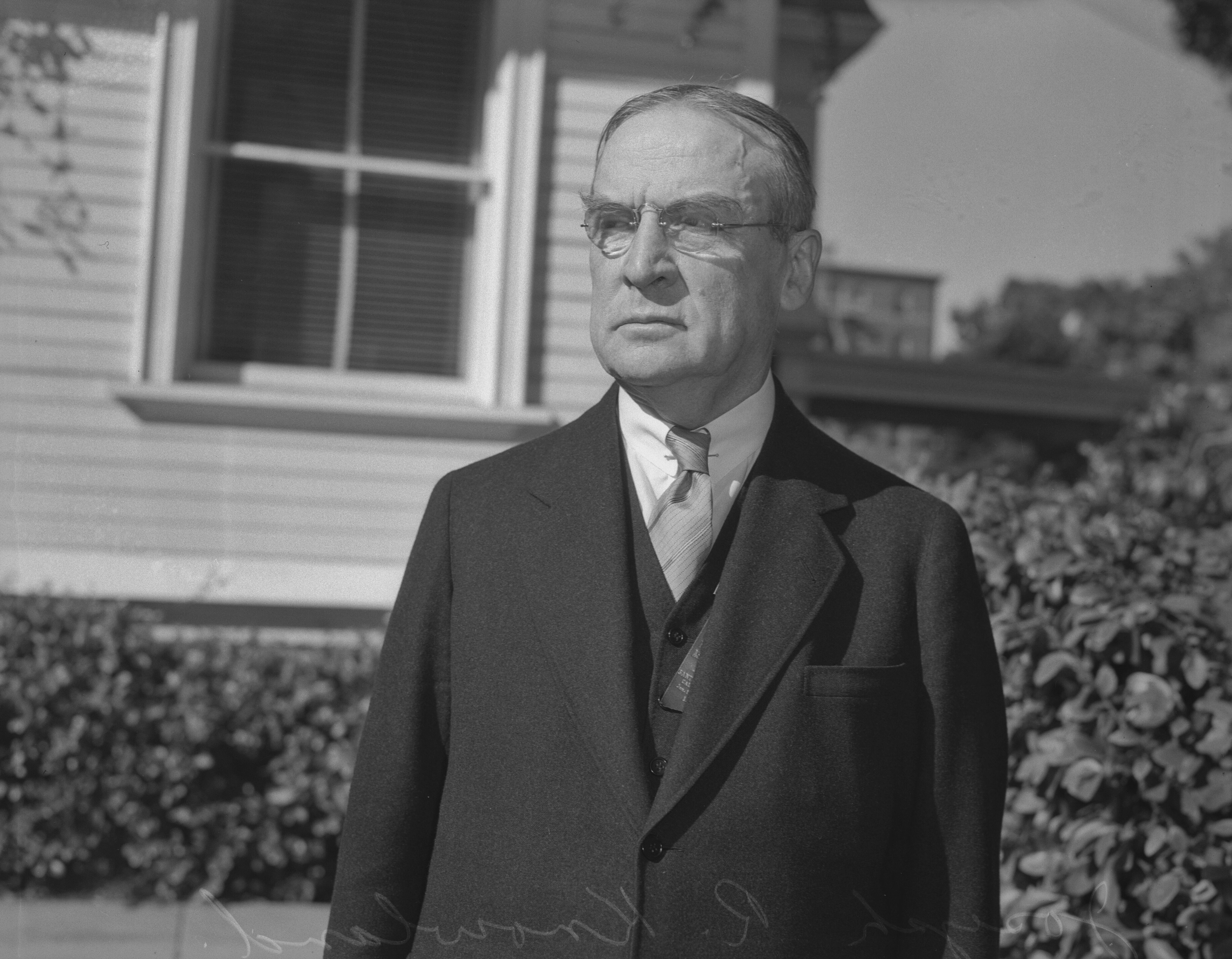
Knowland at the California Newspaper Publishers’ Association annual convention in Los Angeles, January 19, 1936

Knowland became owner, editor, president and publisher of The Oakland Tribune on 3 November 1915. He wrote, "It is perfectly understood that what it [the Tribune] does, rather than what it promises, will determine the true measure of its worth; and with this understanding, the Tribune, under its new control, girds to its work." Many years and court battles with Hermina Peralta Dargie (widow of owner William E. Dargie) passed before Knowland had full control of the Tribune. Knowland built the Tribune Tower, a city landmark at 13th and Franklin Streets. He had a great interest in restoring the California Missions. This had begun in 1903, with Mission San Antonio De Padua. He was a historical advisor during the 1927 California State Park Survey.

In 1932, Knowland went to Washington and persuaded President Herbert Hoover and the Reconstruction Finance Corporation to advance $62 million for the completion of the San Francisco–Oakland Bay Bridge. He created, with Bruno Albert Forsterer and Joseph Blum, the Franklin Investment Company in 1936 (later the Franklin Credit Union). In 1937, he attained the status of 33rd Degree Mason, Ancient Accepted Scottish Rite. Knowland was a member of the Finance Committee of the Golden Gate International Exposition of 1939–1940. In 1941, he authored California: A Landmark History. He was the political mentor of Earl Warren; from assistant Oakland City Attorney to Chief Justice of the United States.

Knowland served on the California State Park Commission from 1934 to 1960 and was chairman from 1938 to 1960. He was appointed by Governor Earl Warren as chairman of the California Centennial Commission from 1948 to 1950. Knowland was honored on September 9, 1951, by the City of Oakland and the State of California, with Joseph Knowland State Arboretum and Park in Oakland. He served as chairman of the Oakland Centennial in 1952, and the Alameda County Centennial in 1953.

Knowland was proud of the political career of his son, William F. Knowland, United States Senator from 1945 to 1959, who served as Senate Majority Leader from 1953 to 1955 and Senate Minority Leader from 1955 to 1959. The only mistake that he felt his son made was his 1958 run and defeat for Governor of California.

He attended his first Republican National Convention in 1904. He attended the GOP conventions as a delegate or newspaperman until 1964. Oakland became a one-newspaper city on September 1, 1950, when William Randolph Hearst closed his Oakland Post-Enquirer. The Oakland Tribune's radio station KLX began operation in 1921 and would be on the air until its sale in 1959.

== Personal life ==
Knowland met Elinor (Ellie) J. Fife (1873–1908) of Tacoma, Washington while they were students at University of the Pacific. Ellie was the daughter of Tacoma businessman W. H. Fife. Knowland and Ellie were married on April 2, 1894, in Tacoma. Three children were born to this union: Elinor Knowland Lion (1895–1978); Joseph Russell "Russ" Knowland, Jr. (1901–1961); and US Senator William F. Knowland (1908–1974). Shortly after the birth of William F. Knowland, Ellie Knowland died.

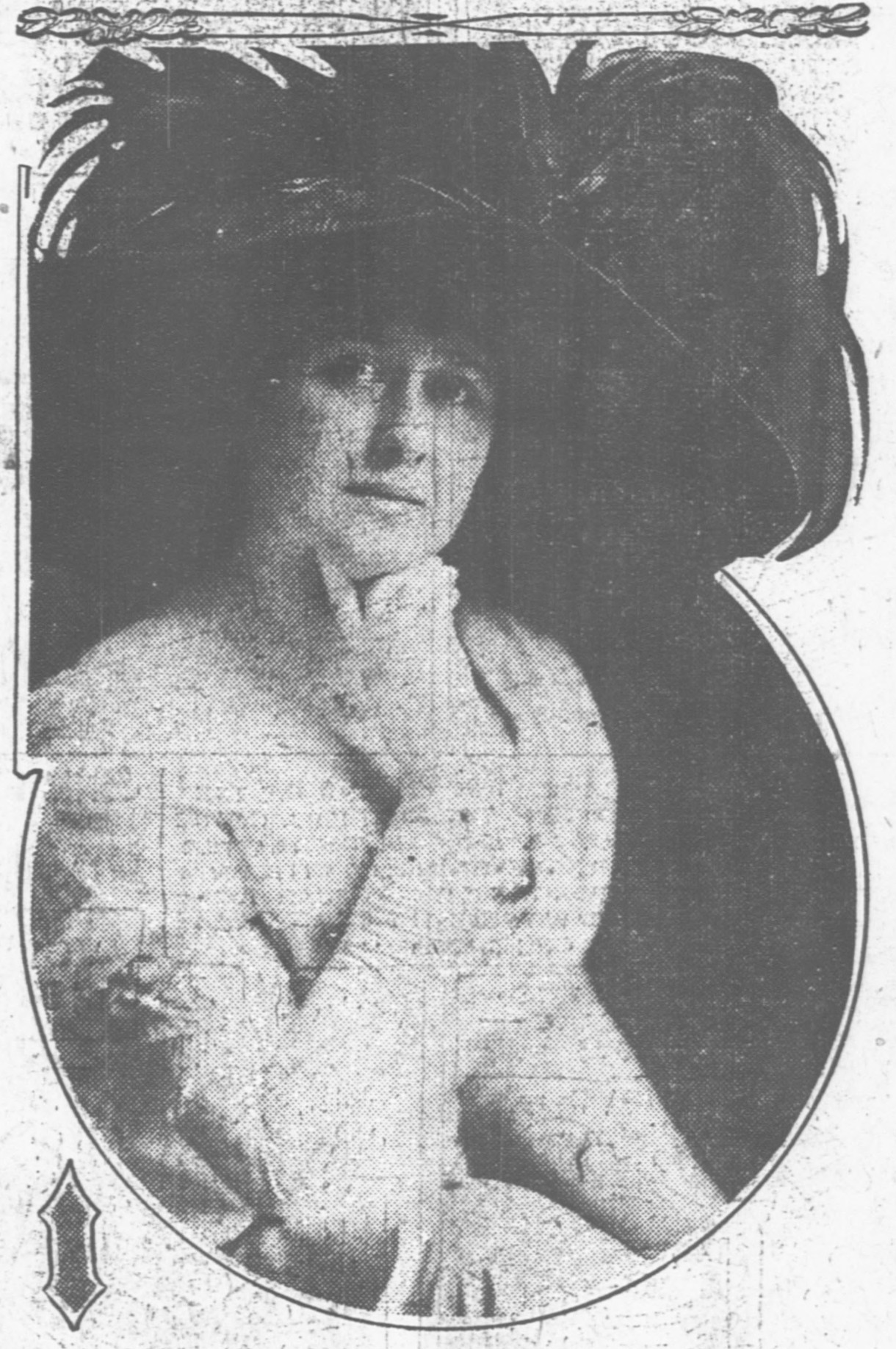
Joseph Knowland's second wife Emelyn in 1912

Knowland, a young widower with children, met Emelyn S. West (1884–1950) of West Lynne, Virginia. On September 28, 1909, they were wed in Chicago, Illinois. Emelyn Knowland was a loving stepmother and active in her husband's social and political life. Emelyn died July 14, 1950, during the California Centennial. Knowland's third wife, Clarice E. "Cookie" Cook (1902–1979), was an officer of the Native Daughters of the Golden West. Knowland and Cook were married on April 6, 1952, in Stockton, California. A shared interest in California history made a happy marriage for Knowland's twilight years. Knowland remained active in his old age and came each day to the Tribune.

== Death and legacy ==
Joseph Russell Knowland died February 1, 1966, in his residence at 25 Seaview Avenue in Piedmont. His wife Clarice and granddaughters Emelyn K. Jewett and Josephine L. Church were at his bedside.

The next day, the Tribune's headline was "Joseph R. Knowland Dead". Joseph R. Knowland was praised by Republicans and Democrats. California Governor Edmund G. Pat Brown said, "Knowland strongly believed in California...the State he loved so well." The public funeral of J.R. Knowland was held at the First Methodist Church and the private family service at Mountain View Cemetery Chapel in Oakland. He was cremated at Mountain View Cemetery Crematory and is inurned with his third wife, Clarice, in Serenity Section, Tier N-4, Number 3 at the Chapel of Memories Columbarium in Oakland, California.

In 1972, Knowland was posthumously inducted into the California Newspaper Hall of Fame.

== Fraternal organizations ==
- Native Sons of the Golden West
- Masons
- Shriners
- Knights Templar
- Ancient Arabic Order of Nobles of the Mystic Shrine
- Bohemian Club
- Pacific Union Club
- Benevolent & Protective Order of Elks—Oakland # 171
- Athens Athletic Club
- Athenian Nile Club
- California Historical Society
- Oakland and Alameda County Pioneers
- Claremont Country Club
- Associated Press
- California Press Association's Newspaper Hall of Fame

== Board memberships ==
- American Trust Company
- Marchant Calculating Machine Company
- Oakland Title Insurance and Guaranty Company
- California State Automobile Association
- American Automobile Association
- Associated Press
- California State Park Commission
- California State Chamber of Commerce

== Electoral history ==
1904 United States House of Representatives elections in California, District 3
Party	Candidate	Votes	%
Republican	Joseph R. Knowland (Incumbent)	24,637	68.6
Democratic	Henry C. McPike	7,210	20.1
Socialist	M. Lesser	3,617	10.1
Prohibition	Bates Morris	471	1.3
Total votes		35,935	100.0
Republican hold			

1906 United States House of Representatives elections in California, District 3
Party	Candidate	Votes	%
Republican	Joseph R. Knowland (Incumbent)	21,510	60.0
Democratic	Hugh W. Brunk	7,716	21.5
Independence	Charles C. Boynton	3,614	10.1
Socialist	William McDevitt	2,514	7.0
Prohibition	T. H. Montgomery	482	1.4
Total votes		35,836	100.0
Republican hold			

1908 United States House of Representatives elections in California, District 3
Party	Candidate	Votes	%
Republican	Joseph R. Knowland (Incumbent)	27,857	64.1
Democratic	George Peckham	9,889	22.8
Socialist	O. W. Philbrick	4,052	9.3
Independence	John A. Sands	923	2.1
Prohibition	T. H. Montgomery	717	1.7
Total votes		43,438	100.0
Republican hold			

1910 United States House of Representatives elections in California, District 3
Party	Candidate	Votes	%
Republican	Joseph R. Knowland (Incumbent)	34,291	81.9
Socialist	S. Miller	6,653	15.9
Prohibition	James N. Christian	906	2.2
Total votes		41,850	100.0
Republican hold			

1912 United States House of Representatives elections
Party	Candidate	Votes	%
Republican	Joseph R. Knowland (Incumbent)	35,219	53.7
Socialist	J. Stitt Wilson	26,234	40.0
Democratic	Hiram A. Luttrell	4,135	6.3
Total votes		65,588	100.0
Republican hold			

1914 U.S. Senate, California election
Party	Candidate	Votes	%
Democratic	James Duval Phelan	279,896	31.59
Progressive	Francis J. Heney	255,232	28.81
Republican	Joseph R. Knowland	254,159	28.69
Socialist	Ernest Untermann	56,805	6.41
Prohibition	Frederick F. Wheeler	39,921	4.51
Majority		24,664	2.78
Total votes		886,013	100.00
Democratic gain from Republican			

== Sources ==
- California Blue Book. Sacramento: State Printing Office, 1909.
- Gothberg, John A. "The Local Influence of Joseph R. Knowland's Oakland Tribune". Minneapolis Journalism Quarterly - 45, (Autumn 1968):487-95.
- Knowland, Joseph R. California: A Landmark History. Oakland: Tribune Press, 1941.
- Wyatt, Daniel E. Joseph R. Knowland: The Political Years 1899-1915. San Francisco, D.Wyatt, 1982.
- Joseph R. Knowland Papers, Bancroft Library, University of California, Berkeley.

California Assembly
Preceded by James A. Waymire	Member of the California State Assembly from the 47th district January 2, 1899 - January 5, 1903	Succeeded by J. Clem Bates, Jr.
California Senate
Preceded by E. K. Taylor	Member of the California State Senate from the 14th district 1903–1904	Succeeded by M. W. Simpson
U.S. House of Representatives
Preceded by Victor H. Metcalf	Member of the U.S. House of Representatives from California's 3rd congressional district 1904–1913	Succeeded by Charles F. Curry
Preceded by James C. Needham	Member of the U.S. House of Representatives from California's 6th congressional district 1913–1915	Succeeded by John A. Elston
Party political offices
First after direct election of Senators was adopted in 1913	Republican nominee for U.S. Senator from California (Class 3); 1914	Succeeded by Samuel M. Shortridge
