= 1926 United States Senate election in California =

- November 2, 1926
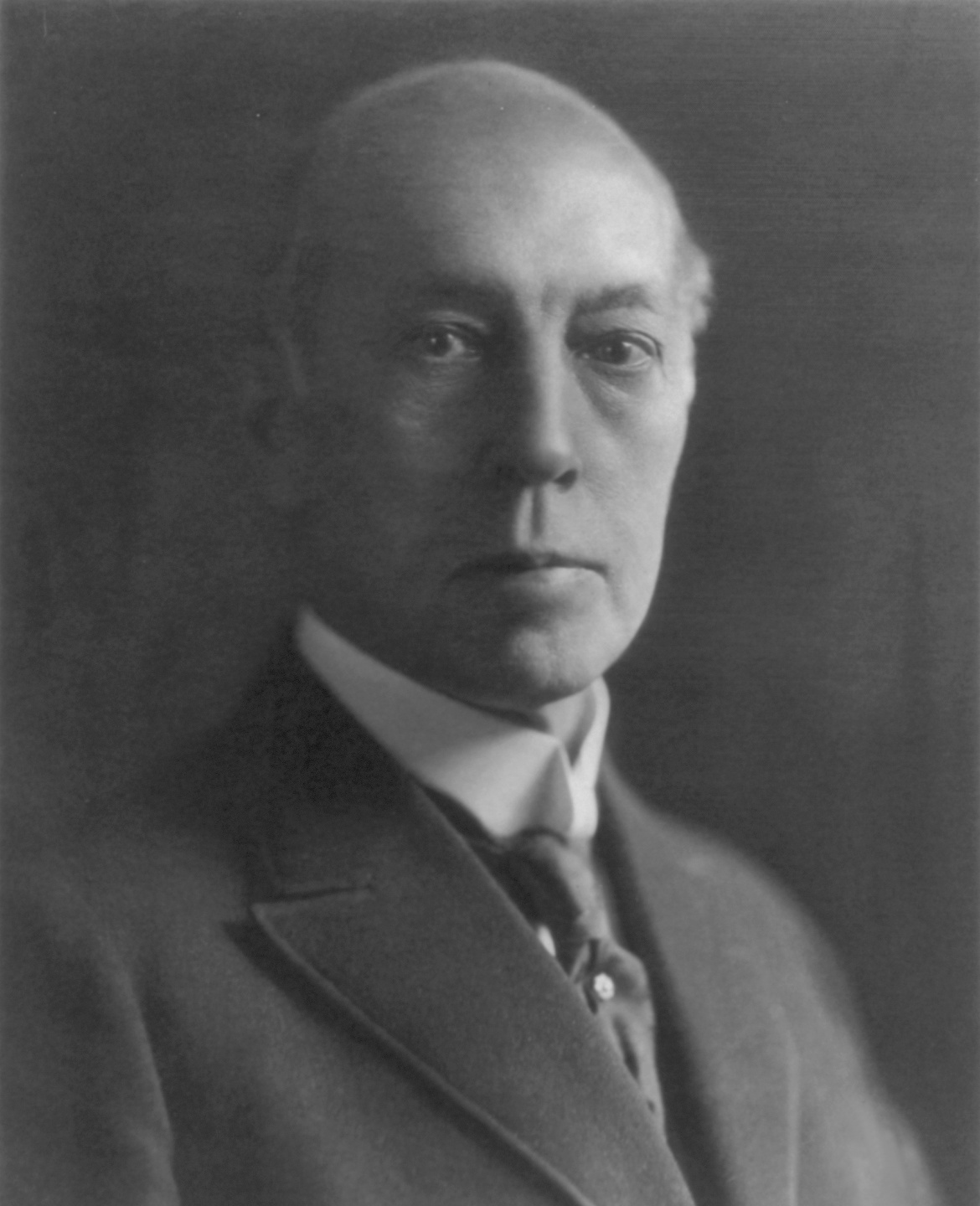

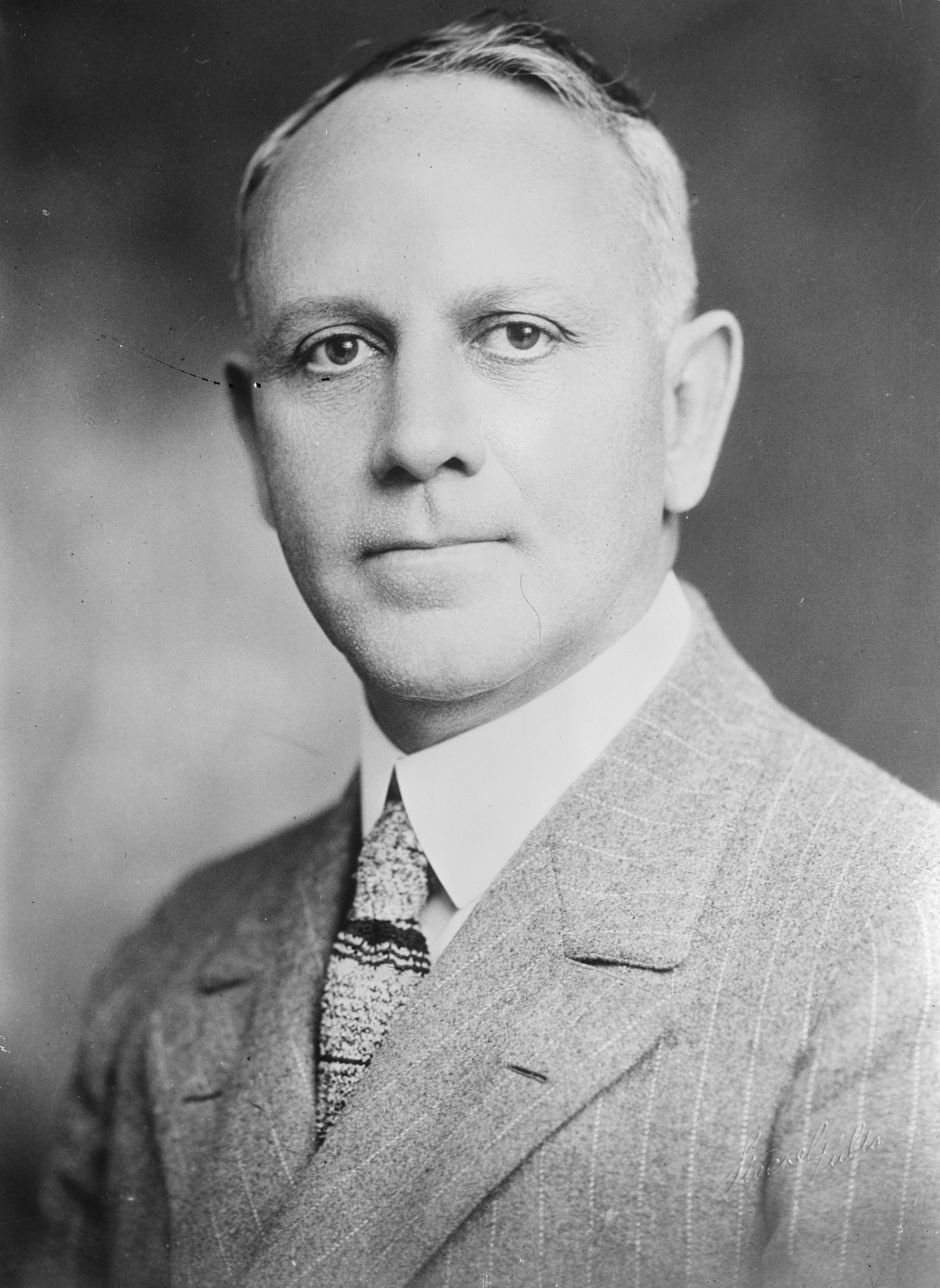
| Nominee | Samuel Morgan Shortridge | John B. Elliott |
| Party | Republican | Democratic |
| Popular vote | 670,128 | 391,599 |
| Percentage | 63.12% | 36.88% |
- County results Shortridge: 50–60% 60–70% 70–80% 80–90% >90%
U.S. senator before election
Samuel Morgan Shortridge
Republican
Elected U.S. Senator
Samuel Morgan Shortridge
Republican

The 1926 United States Senate election in California was held on November 2, 1926. Incumbent Republican Senator Samuel Morgan Shortridge was re-elected to a second term.

== Republican primary ==
=== Candidates ===
- Robert M. Clarke, member of the Los Angeles Harbor Commission
- Walter Lineberger, U.S. Representative from Long Beach
- Samuel Morgan Shortridge, incumbent Senator

=== Campaign ===
Hiram Johnson, the state's senior senator and a progressive maverick, recruited Clarke as an opponent to his own colleague and fellow Republican. Johnson sought to unseat Shortridge in order to undermine President Calvin Coolidge, whom he opposed, and to balance the Senate delegation with a native of Southern California, in order to boost his own re-election in 1928. (Johnson also supported C. C. Young for the governorship against incumbent Friend Richardson.)

Shortridge ran his campaign on his support for Coolidge, protective tariffs, and proposals for a World Court. The primary was bitter and considered tantamount to election, given minimal registration for the Democratic Party in the state.

=== Results ===
1926 Republican Senate primary
| Party | Candidate | Votes | % |
|---|---|---|---|
| Republican | Samuel Morgan Shortridge (incumbent) | 339,827 | 48.04% |
| Republican | Robert M. Clarke | 239,011 | 33.79% |
| Republican | Walter Lineberger | 128,488 | 18.17% |
| Total votes | | 707,326 | 100.00% |

== Democratic primary ==
=== Candidates ===
- Isidore B. Dockweiler, former Member of the United States Board of Indian Commissioners
- John B. Elliott, former Collector of the Port of Los Angeles

=== Campaign ===
Elliott was endorsed by former Secretary of the Treasury William Gibbs McAdoo, who would win this seat himself in 1932.

=== Results ===
1926 Democratic Senate primary
| Party | Candidate | Votes | % |
|---|---|---|---|
| Democratic | John B. Elliott | 77,841 | 60.18% |
| Democratic | Isidore B. Dockweiler | 51,507 | 39.82% |
| Total votes | | 129,348 | 100.00% |

== General election ==
=== Results ===
1926 United States Senate election in California
| Party | Candidate | Votes | % |
|---|---|---|---|
| Republican | Samuel Morgan Shortridge (incumbent) | 670,128 | 63.12% |
| Democratic | John B. Elliott | 391,599 | 36.88% |
| Total votes | | 1,061,727 | 100.00% |

== See also ==
- 1926 United States Senate elections
