= Samuel M. Shortridge =

American politician (1861-1952)

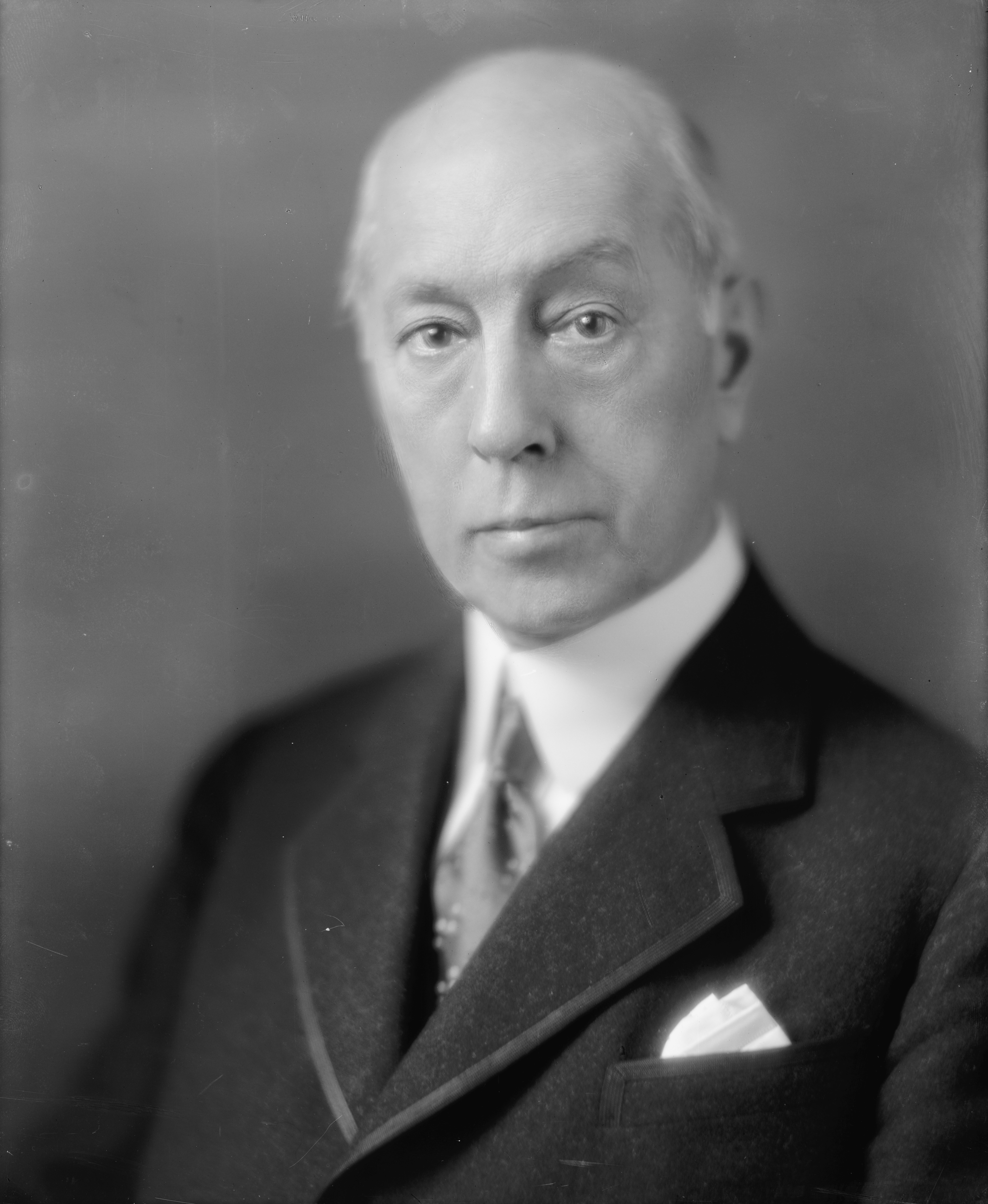
- Portrait c. 1921–1933

United States Senator from California
- In office March 4, 1921 – March 3, 1933
- Preceded by: James D. Phelan
- Succeeded by: William G. McAdoo

Personal details
- Born: August 3, 1861 Mount Pleasant, Iowa, U.S.
- Died: January 15, 1952 (aged 90) Atherton, California, U.S.
- Resting place: Oak Hill Memorial Park, San Jose, California, U.S.
- Party: Republican
- Spouse: Laura Leigh Gashwiler (m. 1889)
- Children: Samuel Jr.; John
- Relatives: Clara S. Foltz (sister); Charles M. Shortridge (brother)

Samuel Morgan Shortridge (August 3, 1861 – January 15, 1952) was an American attorney and politician who served as a U.S. senator from California from 1921 to 1933.

== Early years ==
Shortridge was born in Mount Pleasant, Iowa and moved to California as a child with his family, settling in San Jose in 1875. He attended school until 1879 and became a teacher in Napa County for four years after. He came to San Francisco in 1883 to practice law.

== Career ==
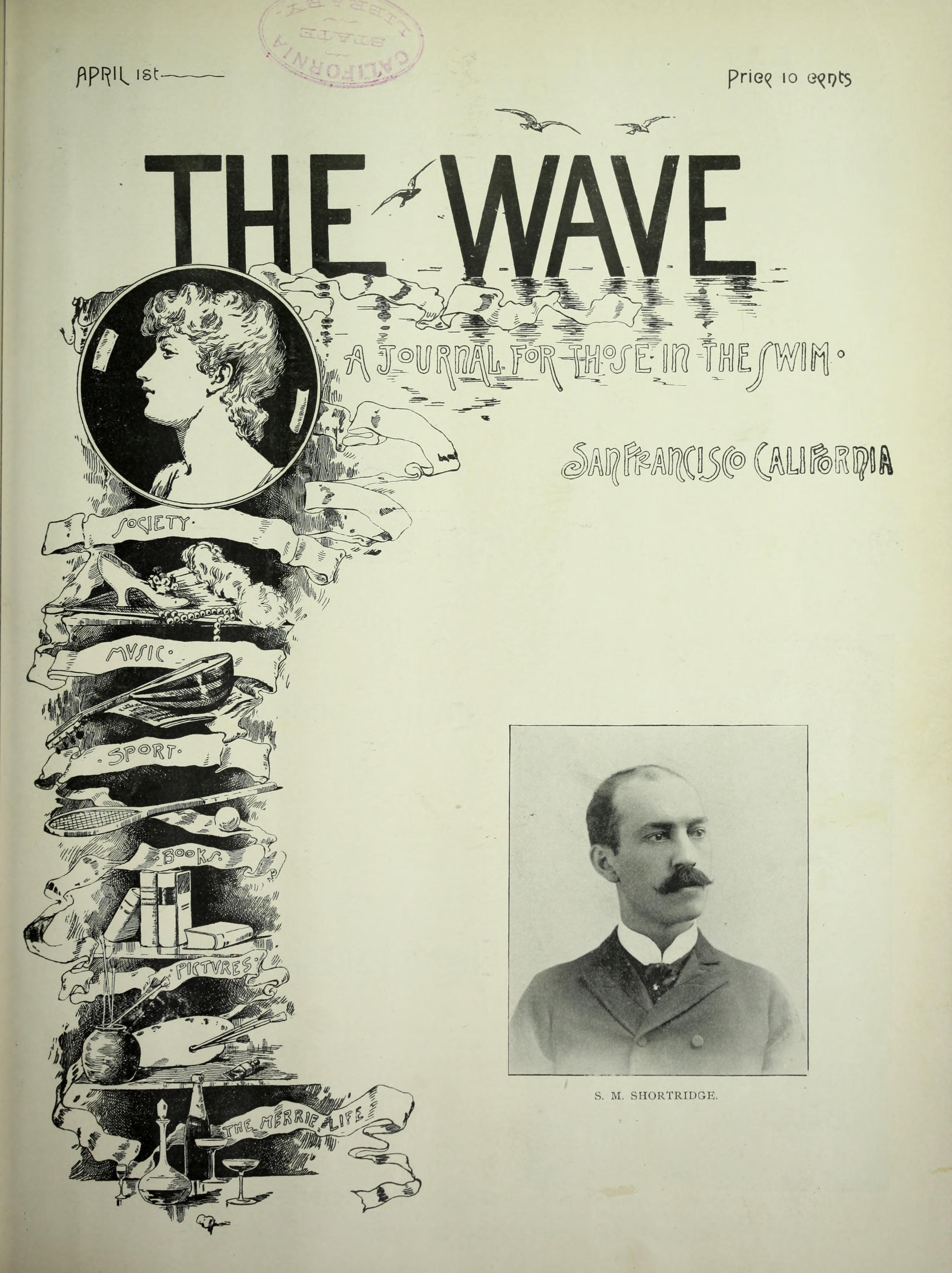
Shortridge on the cover of The Wave, April 1, 1893

Shortridge came to prominence as a Republican orator and leading member of the Bar Association of San Francisco. He acted as Abe Ruef's attorney during the San Francisco graft trials.

Shortridge was a presidential elector in 1888, 1900, and 1908. He lost the 1914 U.S. Senate Republican primary to veteran congressman Joseph R. Knowland, who was defeated in the general election by James D. Phelan. Shortridge was elected to the U.S. Senate in 1920, riding Warren G. Harding's post World War I "Return to Normalcy" campaign. Defeating Phelan and strong candidates from the Prohibition Party and Socialist Party of America, Shortridge won the general election with 49% of the vote. He was reelected in 1926 with 63% of the vote over Democrat John B. Elliott. He served two full terms before being defeated in a primary in 1932.

Shortridge became a prominent voice for racist anti-Japanese forces in California, declaring that a child of Japanese immigrants would regard "himself or herself as a native of Japan. His heart, his affections go out to the native land of the parent.". Shortridge's claims in 1924 were remarkably similar to some of the justifications made for Japanese internment during World War II. Even some senators who wanted to favor northern and western European immigrants found Shortridge's anti-Japanese position unnecessary.

Shortridge served as a special attorney for the Justice Department in Washington, D.C. from 1939 to 1943.

== Personal life and death ==
Shortridge died in Atherton, California on January 15, 1952. He was buried at Oak Hill Memorial Park in San Jose.

His sister, Clara S. Foltz, became the first female lawyer in California in 1878, and the first female deputy district attorney in the U.S. in 1910. She helped him campaign for the Senate.

His brother, Charles M. Shortridge, was the owner of the San Jose newspaper The Daily Mercury and purchased The San Francisco Call in 1895.

He was a member of the Bohemian Club. (Varied Types by Edward F. O'Day)

Party political offices
Preceded by Joseph R. Knowland	Republican nominee for U.S. Senator from California (Class 3); 1920, 1926	Succeeded by Tallant Tubbs
U.S. Senate
Preceded by James D. Phelan	U.S. Senator (Class 3) from California; 1921–1933	Succeeded by William Gibbs McAdoo
