= James D. Phelan =

United States Senator and 25th Mayor of San Francisco (1861–1930)

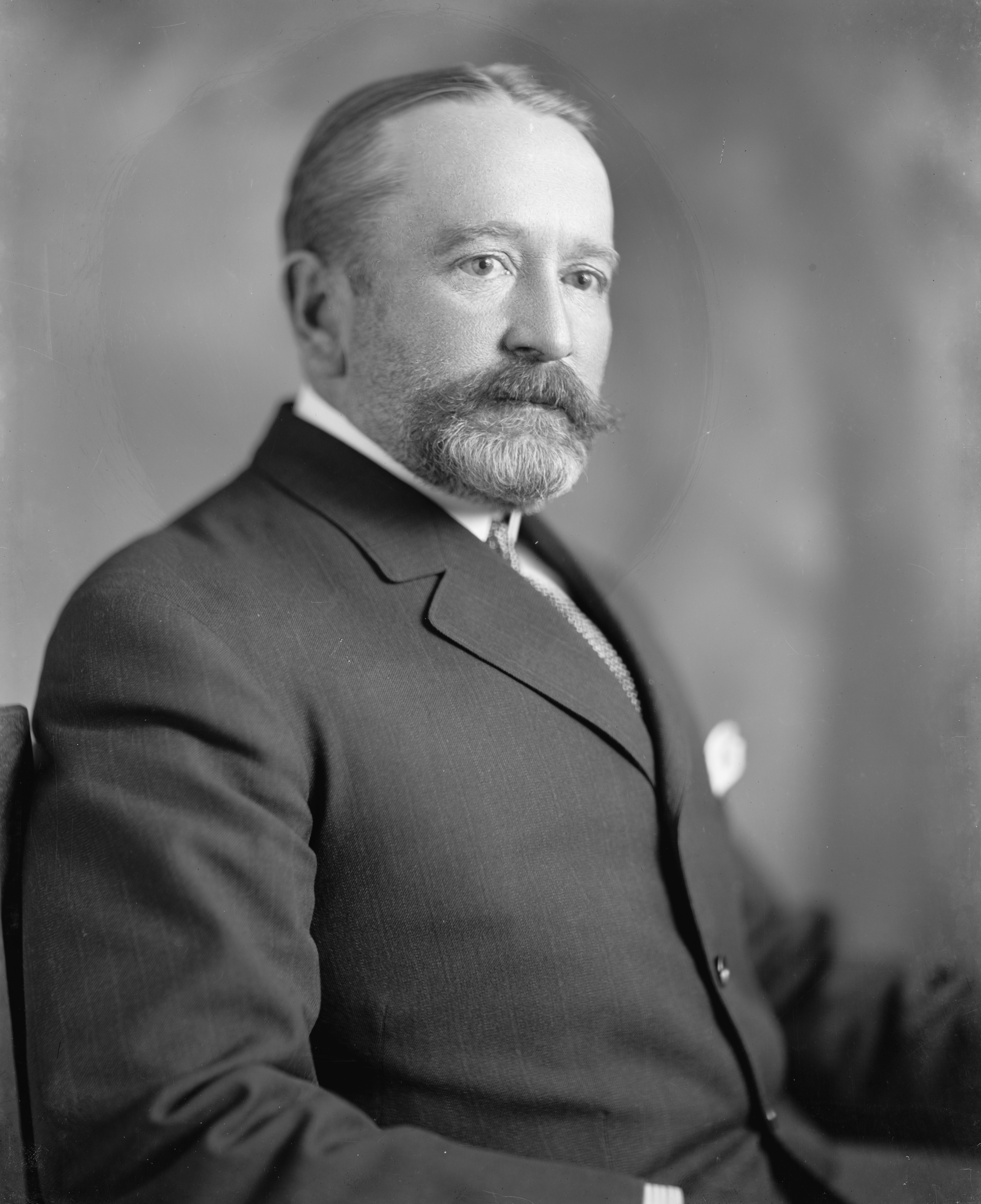
- Portrait by Harris & Ewing c. 1914

United States Senator from California
- In office March 4, 1915 – March 3, 1921
- Preceded by: George Clement Perkins
- Succeeded by: Samuel M. Shortridge

25th Mayor of San Francisco
- In office January 4, 1897 – January 7, 1902
- Preceded by: Adolph Sutro
- Succeeded by: Eugene Schmitz

Personal details
- Born: James Duval Phelan; April 20, 1861 San Francisco, California, U.S.
- Died: August 7, 1930 (aged 69) Saratoga, California, U.S.
- Party: Democratic
- Education: St. Ignatius College; University of California-Berkeley
- Profession: Banker, politician

James Duval Phelan (April 20, 1861 – August 7, 1930) was an American politician, civic leader, and banker who served as the mayor of San Francisco from 1897 to 1902 and as a U.S. senator from California from 1915 to 1921. As mayor he advocated municipally run utilities and tried to protect his constituents from the monopolistic practices of the trusts. In the Senate, Phelan was a progressive supporter of the policies of Woodrow Wilson and was a leader in the movement to restrict Japanese and Chinese immigration to the United States.

== Early life and education ==
Phelan was born in San Francisco, the son of James Phelan, an Irish immigrant and banker, and Alice Kelly. He was raised in the city's South of Market neighborhood and had two sisters, Alice Phelan Sullivan and Mary Louis Phelan.

In 1881 Phelan graduated from the Catholic Jesuit college in San Francisco, St. Ignatius College. He then studied law at the University of California, Berkeley and became a banker.

== Mayor of San Francisco ==
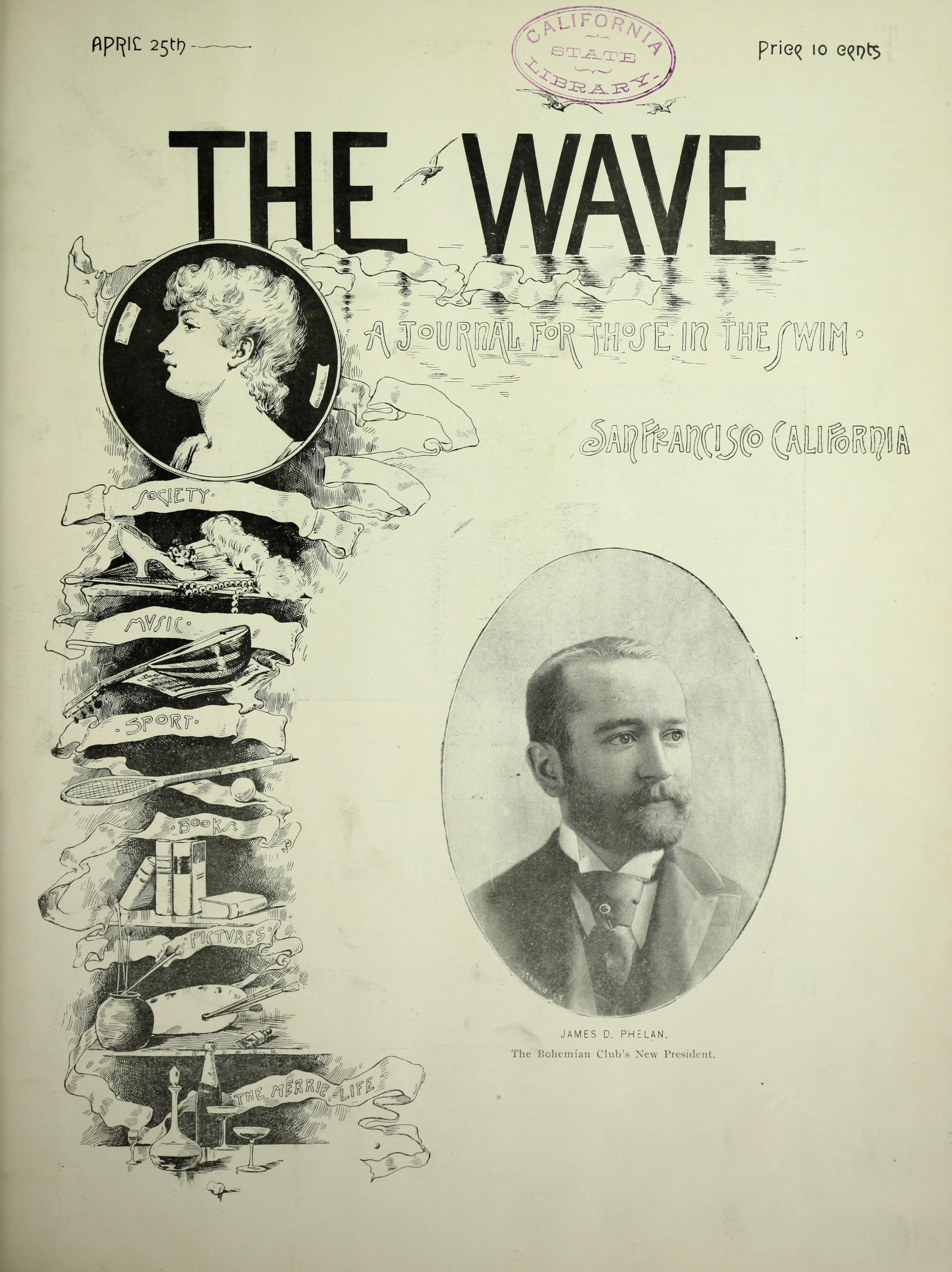
Phelan on the cover of The Wave, April 25, 1891

Phelan was elected Mayor of San Francisco in 1896, serving from 1897 until 1902, in three 2-year terms. He successfully pushed for the reform City Charter of 1898. He served as the first president of the League of California Cities, established in 1898. He was the Democratic candidate for U.S. Senate in 1900, but lost to Republican Thomas R. Bard.

During his tenure, Phelan appointed several former members of the anti-Chinese Workingmen's Party of California to public office. On New Year's Eve 1899, he named former city tax collector John H. Grady to the Board of Fire Commissioners, one of his first appointments under the new charter. In 1900, he named former state senator Joseph C. Gorman to the office of Secretary of the Board of Fire Commissioners and former assemblymen A. B. Maguire and Samuel Braunhart to the Board of Public Works and Board of Supervisors, respectively. The next year, he chose former constitutional convention delegate Clitus Barbour to revise city ordinances. He also nominated former city auditor John P. Dunn for the office of Gas Inspector, but he was rejected by the Board of Supervisors.

=== San Francisco Plague ===
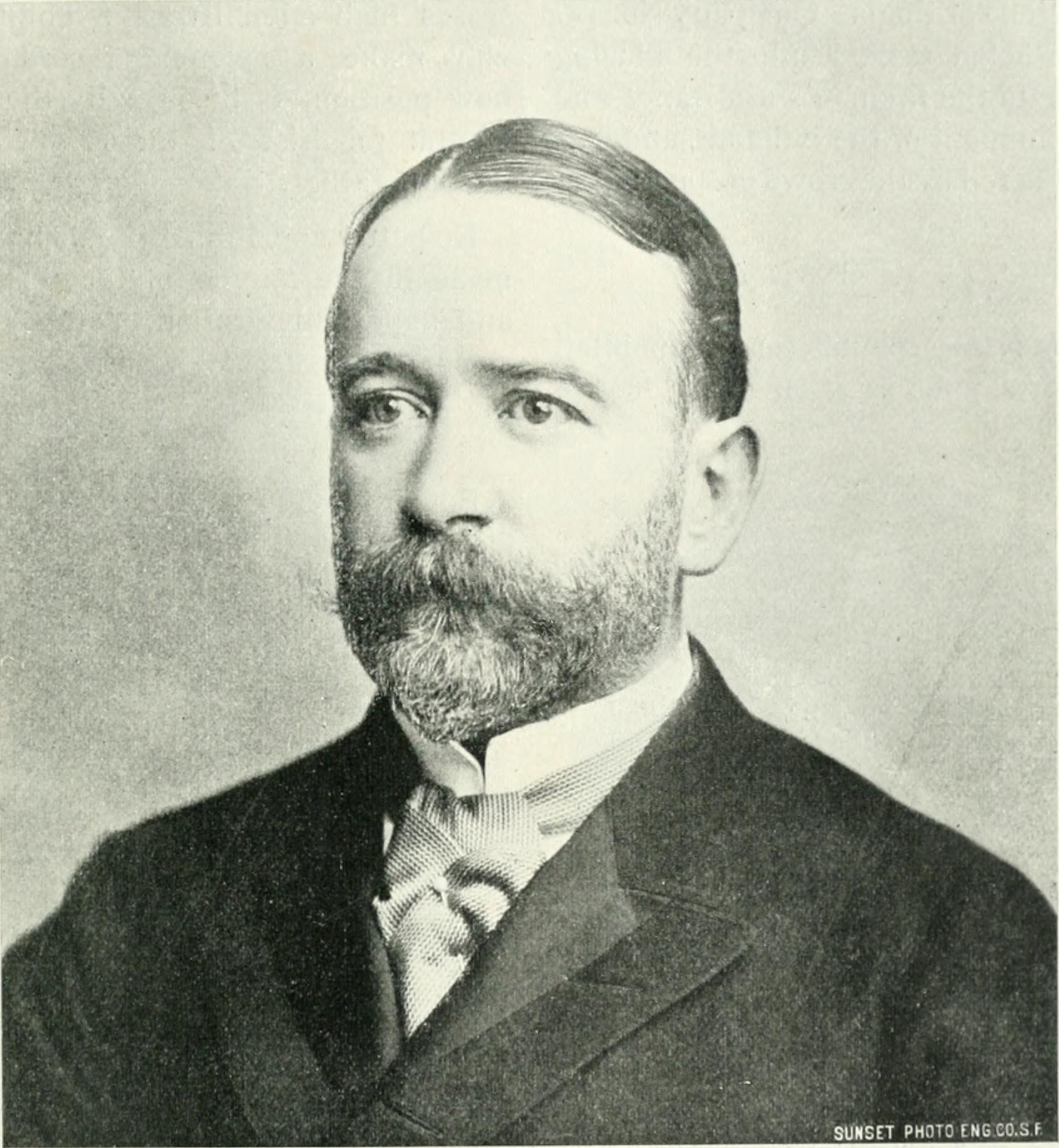
Phelan as mayor c. 1900

In 1900, San Francisco citizens distrusted government for previous waste of taxpayers' money as well as previous refusal to enhance community resources. Government officials refused to invest in public health because health was seen as a personal concern or even a commodity. For this reason, citizens had a lot of hope in Mayor Phelan, who had previously declared the need for healthier living conditions as well as the need for "health departments to provide salutary environments."

During his tenure as the Mayor of San Francisco, Phelan and his administration were faced with dealing with the plague of 1900–1904 that infected the city's Chinatown community. Prior to the plague outbreak in Chinatown, Phelan was an active advocate for improving public health in San Francisco. On October 25, 1897, Phelan addressed the California health board in San Francisco and stated that government intervention was needed in order to establish healthier living conditions. He argued that public health departments required more funding to help improve living conditions. Furthermore, in 1899, Phelan continued his strong advocacy for public health and the prevention of disease through city measures. Later that year, in a shocking move, he opted instead to support an $18 million bond to create a new hospital, schools, and city parks. In September 1899, Phelan and the San Francisco Board of Supervisors further defunded the cities health department. The San Francisco health department was only allocated $155,960 with two-thirds of that going towards the operation of a municipal hospital. Shortly after, the health board members were released from their duties due to political in-house fighting and excessive patronage. After being sworn in, Phelan's new health department board members discovered that the department was broke and that within the first six months of fiscal year 1899-1900 the department had already spent the majority of its budget. Through the defunding and mishandling of the department, Phelan and his administration left the health department and the city ill-prepared for what was looming around the corner.

In June 1900 San Francisco's city hall received the news that Joseph J. Kinyoun had instituted a travel ban in hopes of preventing the spread of the plague to the rest of the country. Mayor Phelan confirmed the news by stating that Kinyoun had notified him personally about the travel ban. Phelan went on to blame the federal court ruling that restricted the ability of the local government to deal with the plague. In order to improve sanitary living conditions in Chinatown, Governor Henry Gage proposed to hire inspectors and workers to eradicate the plague. Gage requested for Mayor Phelan and his administration to match the state's $25,000 contribution. However, Phelan informed Governor Gage that the city did not have the resources to match the state's contribution. After meeting with Governor Gage, Phelan and his Board of Supervisors agreed to contribute $6,000. In the summer of 1901, Mayor Phelan publicly announced that he would not run for another term. "During his final address before leaving office, Phelan praised the health board, claiming that because of its vigilance the city 'was saved from Oriental infection.'" Phelan concluded by thanking the federal government and their efforts to help the city endure the crisis.

Although the San Francisco Plague in Chinatown was reported in journalism, the material printed was prone to exaggerations, biased information, and focused on making the Chinese population look substandard. Newspapers were heavily averse to the Phelan administration and believed the health officials were corrupt and wasteful. For this reason, publications refused to print public health initiatives to prevent disease outbreaks and instead would focus on the community's lack of sanitation. Acts of racism were apparent because publications were heavily inclined to use offensive images and headlines to attract attention of readers.

== Water and land rights ==
In the 1900s, Phelan bought land and water acreage in various places around the San Francisco Bay Area, and he obtained the rights to the water flow of the Tuolumne River in Hetch Hetchy Valley. Ethan A. Hitchcock, Secretary of the Interior under President Theodore Roosevelt, tried to stop Phelan, but Roosevelt decided that the wild area could be used for "the permanent material development of the region." Phelan's plans for the region included publicly funded water and electricity for a geographical entity he called "Greater San Francisco." With his Bohemian Club fellows, Phelan sought to annex land at the perimeter of San Francisco Bay.

== Earthquake recovery efforts ==
During the 1906 San Francisco earthquake Phelan was a member of the Committee of Fifty, called into existence by Mayor Schmitz to manage the crisis. Afterward, when Dr. Edward Thomas Devine, representing the American Red Cross by appointment of President Roosevelt, was responsible for Relief and Red Cross Funds, ex-Mayor Phelan was allowed to assist Devine, thus keeping the money out of the hands of Schmitz and political boss Abe Ruef.

== U.S. Senate ==
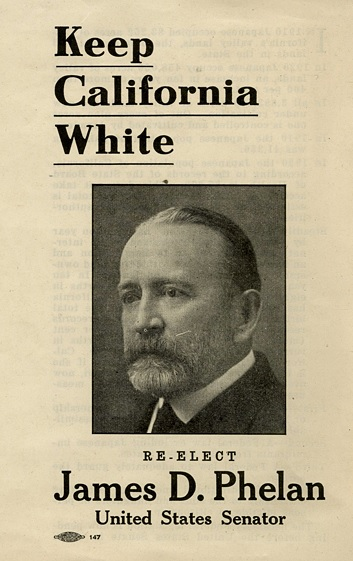
A 1920 re-election campaign pamphlet touting Phelan's white supremacy

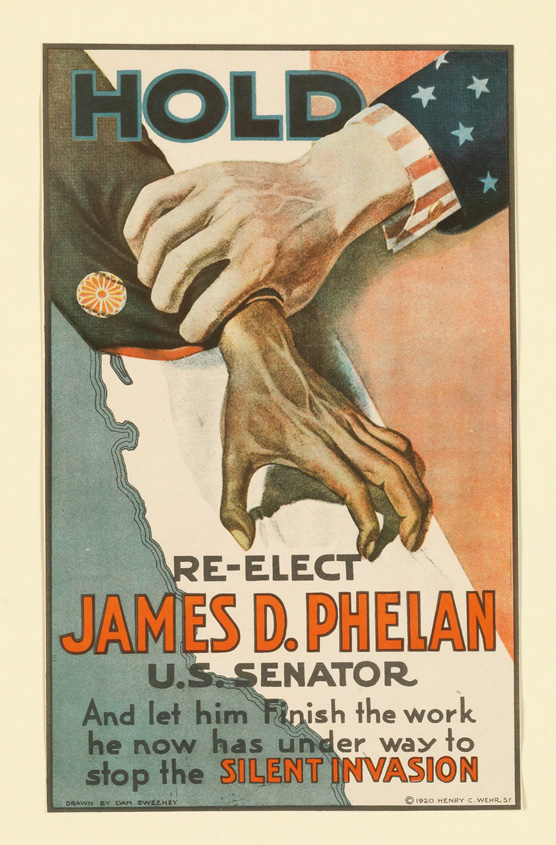
A political poster, also from 1920, depicting the hand of Uncle Sam grabbing a Japanese wrist reaching for California

As a Democrat, Phelan ran for the U.S. Senate against Republican Joseph R. Knowland and Progressive Francis J. Heney. He was elected to the United States Senate in 1914 and served from March 4, 1915, to March 3, 1921. During his tenure, Phelan established himself as a leader in what fellow anti-Japanese agitator V. S. McClatchy described as the "holy cause" of Japanese exclusion. He had been active in the anti-Japanese movement prior to his election, securing then-presidential candidate Woodrow Wilson's support for restricting Japanese immigration in 1912 and helping to push through California's discriminatory alien land law in 1913. Although he toned down his anti-Japanese rhetoric during World War I, when the United States was allied with Japan, Phelan once again began to speak out against the "Yellow Peril" in 1919, delivering a speech in favor of Japanese exclusion before a special session of the state legislature.

Phelan was also an advocate for excluding Chinese from the United States. He promoted the Chinese Exclusion Act of 1882 and wrote an article "Why the Chinese Should Be Excluded"(1901) in the North American Review, to increase support for the extension of these laws. In a debate with Imperial Chinese Consul Ho Yow, Phelan mentioned that the Chinese were an undesirable population because they had strong ties to their native country and were incapable of assimilating to the American society. This debate occurred just nineteen months after the outbreak of plague in San Francisco's Chinatown. Phelan mentioned that the Chinese had different mindsets and that after twenty years, they remained unchanged in their values. He concluded that American progress would be stunted if the United States continued to allow Chinese immigrants to remain in the country, and that the Chinese workers were taking work away from white workers because they worked for so much lower wages and an accustomed lower standard of living, allowing their labor to be exploited unfairly, driving down conditions of labor and standards of living generally.

During his tenure, Phelan voted for the 19th Amendment, granting women the right to vote, and against the Volstead Act, which established Prohibition in the United States. In 1920, he received a near-perfect "labor record" from the American Federation of Labor, having voted against their supported legislation only once.

He was an unsuccessful candidate for reelection in 1920, defeated by Republican Samuel M. Shortridge, coming in second with 40% of the vote. His re-election campaign relied on racial fears; one of his reelection campaign posters contained the headline "Keep California White." During his time in the Senate, he was chairman of the U.S. Senate Committee on Railroads during the 64th Congress and of the U.S. Senate Committee on Irrigation and Reclamation of Arid Lands during the 65th Congress.

== Later life ==
After his time in the Senate, Phelan returned to banking and collected art. He remained active in the anti-Japanese movement, collaborating with McClatchy and the Japanese Exclusion League of California to successfully ban Japanese immigrants from entering the country with the Immigration Act of 1924. First National Bank of San Francisco merged with Crocker National Bank in 1925. Phelan died at his country estate Villa Montalvo in Saratoga in 1930. He is buried in the family mausoleum in Holy Cross Cemetery in Colma, California.

== Legacy ==
- Upon his death, Phelan bequeathed the Villa Montalvo estate for use as a public park. Since 1930, it has been a center for the performing and visual arts called Montalvo Arts Center. Some of his mementos and correspondence are on display in the library at Villa Montalvo.
- Phelan Avenue, the main thoroughfare on the Ocean Campus of the City College of San Francisco, named after him was changed in 2018 to Frida Kahlo Way after a public vote.
- The unincorporated community of Phelan, California was named for him and his brother.
- The James D. Phelan awards, given to young California writers and artists, were established by a bequest in his will.
- A dormitory at the University of San Francisco used to be called Phelan Hall but was renamed in 2017 after protests by students concerned about Phelan's racist views.
- In 1887, James D. Phelan's father bought an 11-acre parcel on Point Santa Cruz as a family summer retreat, called Phelan Park. The property stayed in the family until a great-niece, Alice Sullivan Doyle, died in 1932. A year earlier Mrs. Doyle had funded construction of the Mission Santa Cruz chapel replica, and she is buried in an alcove off the chapel. A large portion of Phelan Park was given to the Oblates of St. Joseph, and the rest became Lighthouse Field State Beach in 1978.
- As mayor, he promoted bond issues for new sewer systems, city hospitals, and schools.
- Despite his contributions to San Francisco’s economic and industrial growth, James D. Phelan's white nativist ideology has caused controversy. His infamous slogan while running for re-election in the US Senate, “Keep California White”, earned allies as well as enemies and he was defeated.

== See also ==
- John P. Irish, who opposed Phelan over the latter's anti-Japanese proposals

== Sources ==
- Legacy of a Native Son: James Duval Phelan & Villa Montalvo (1993) by James P. Walsh and Timothy O'Keefe and
- "Creating the Fortune, Creating the Family," Journal of the West, (April 1992), by James P. Walsh
- Gordon Thomas & Max Morgan Witts: The San Francisco Earthquake (Stein and Day, New York; Souvenir Press, London, 1971; reprinted Dell, 1972, SBN 440-07631)

Party political offices
First after direct election of Senators was adopted in 1913	Democratic nominee for U.S. Senator from California (Class 3); 1914, 1920	Succeeded by John B. Elliott
Political offices
Preceded by Adolph Sutro	Mayor of San Francisco; 1897–1902	Succeeded by Eugene Schmitz
U.S. Senate
Preceded by George C. Perkins	U.S. Senator (Class 3) from California; 1915–1921; Served alongside: John D. Works, Hiram Johnson	Succeeded by Samuel M. Shortridge
