= 1914 United States Senate election in California =

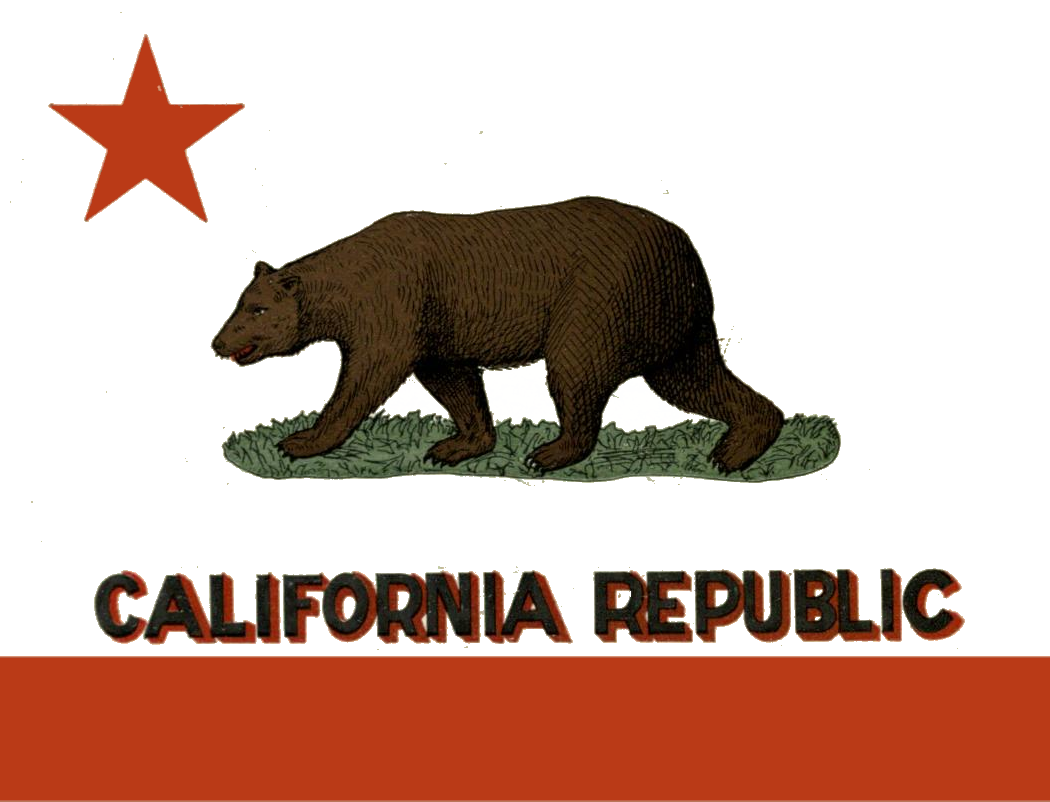
- November 3, 1914
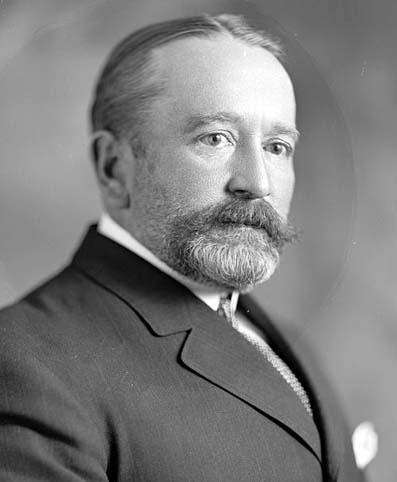

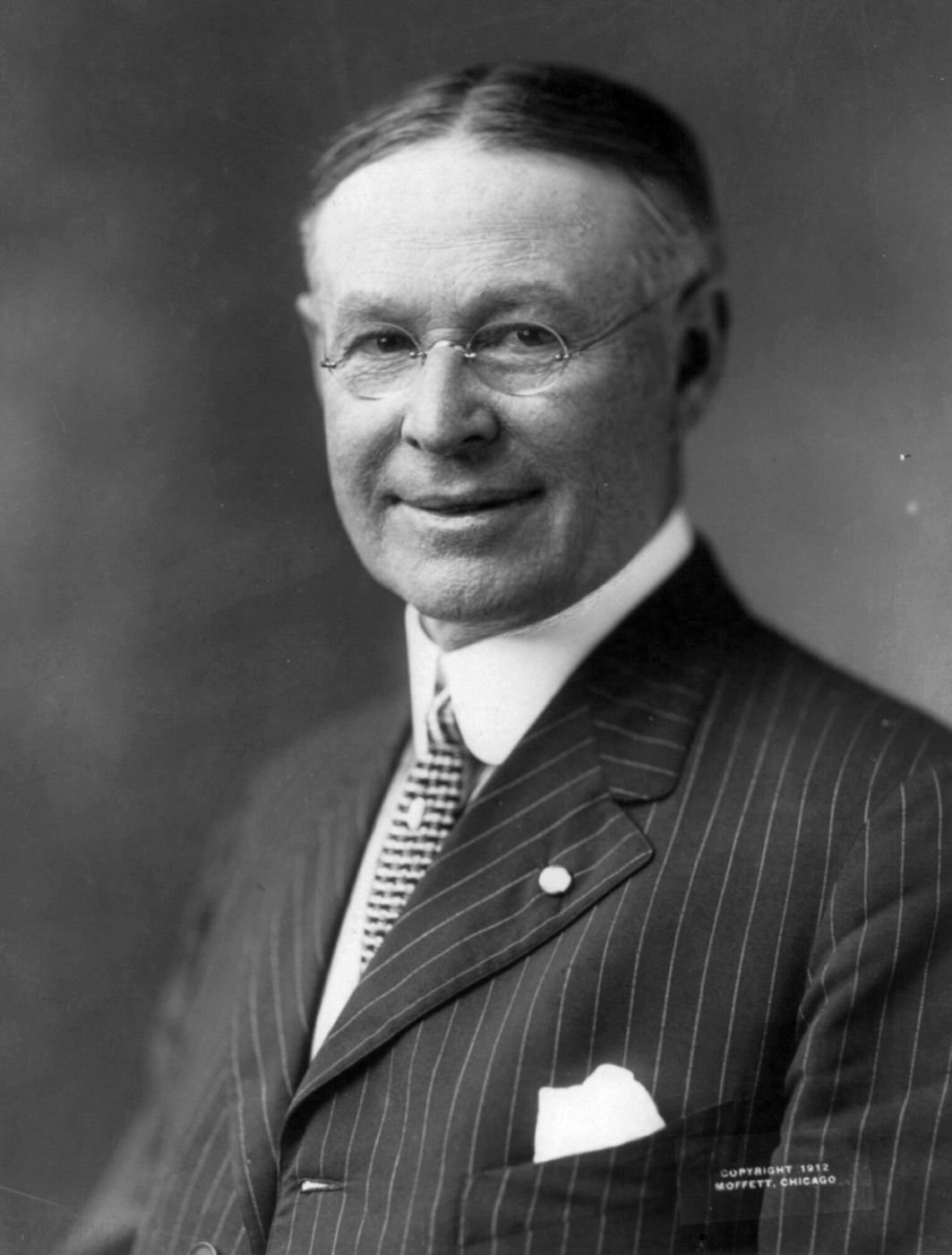

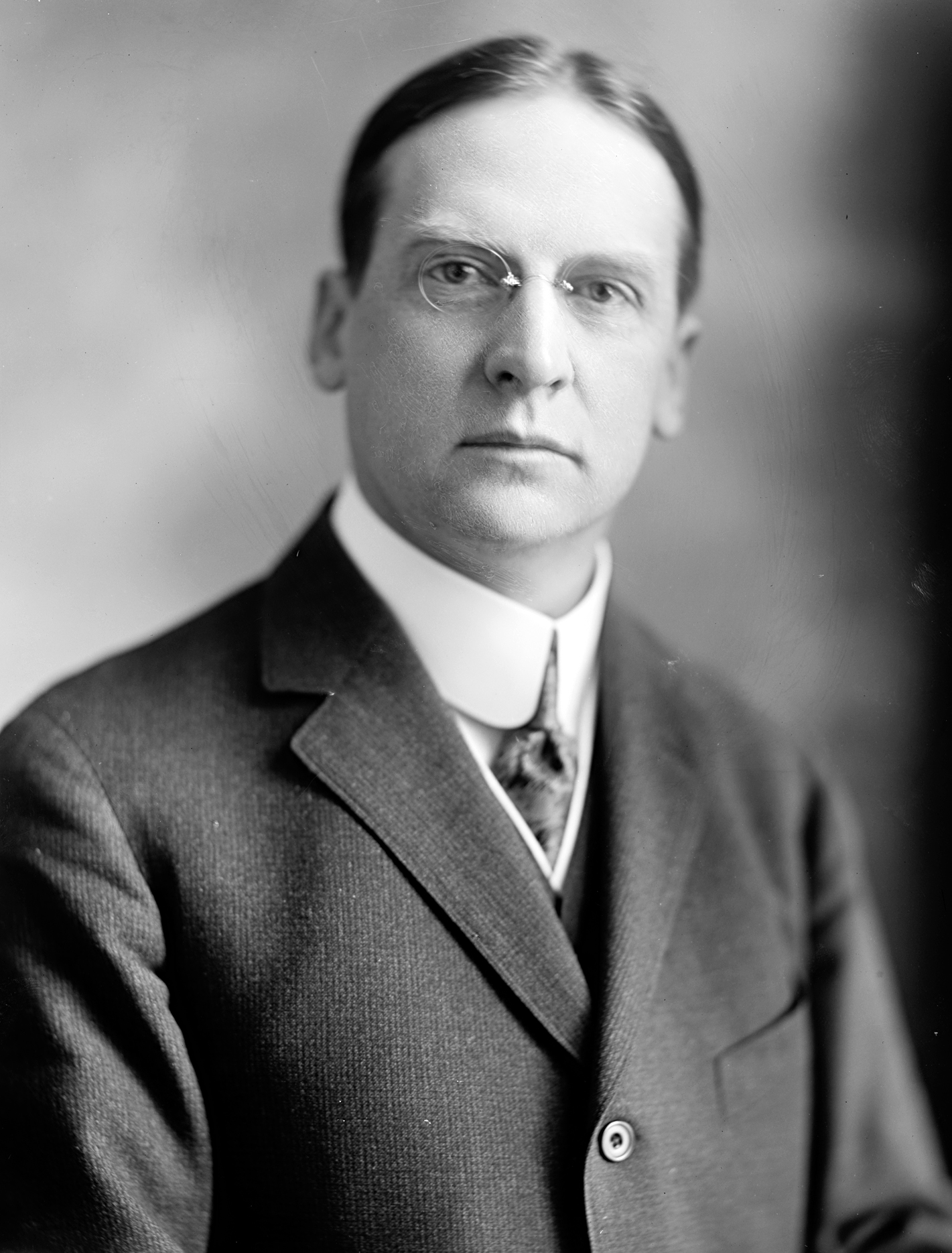

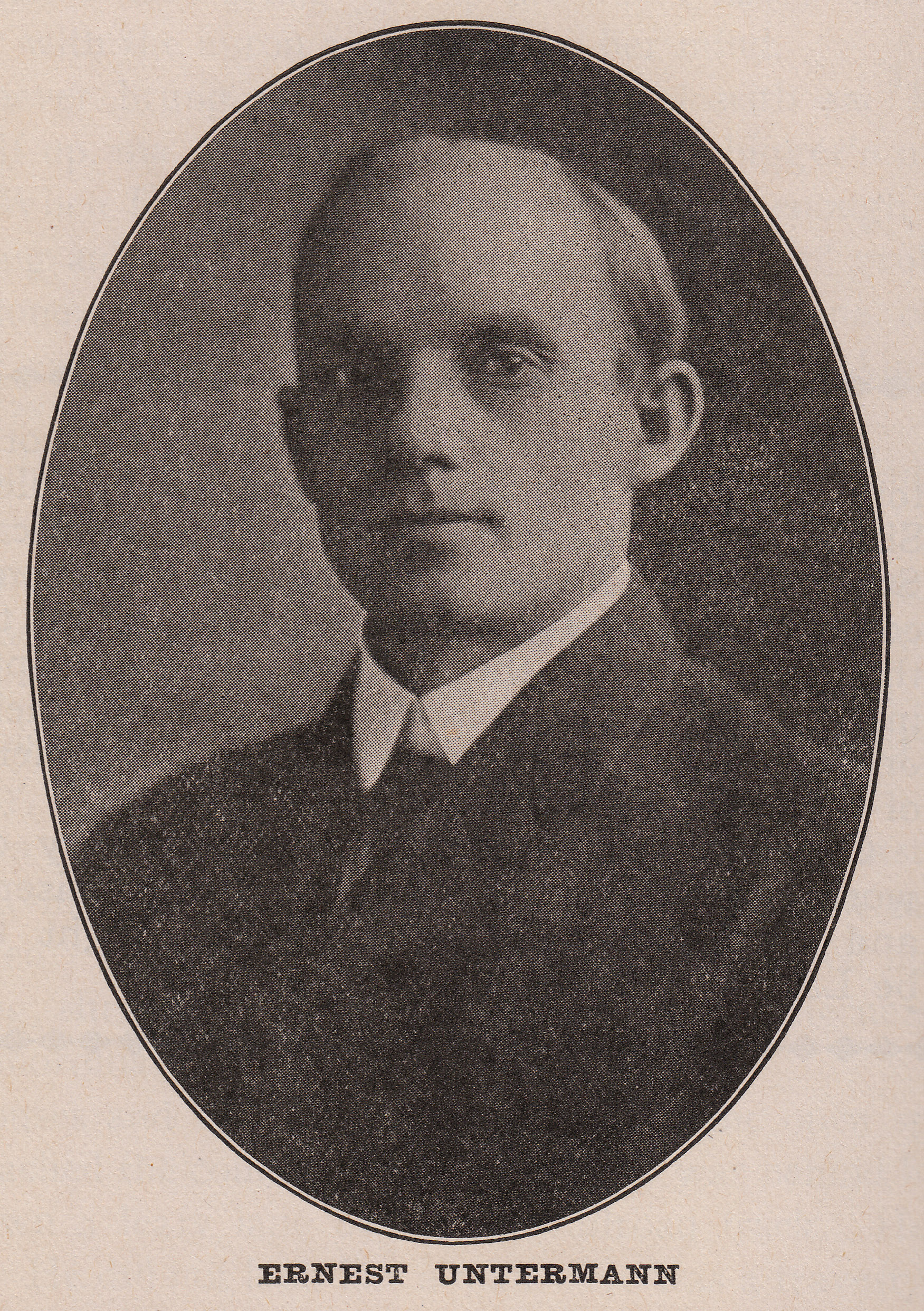
Nominee	James Duval Phelan	Francis J. Heney
Party	Democratic	Progressive
Popular vote	279,896	255,232
Percentage	31.59%	28.81%
Nominee	Joseph R. Knowland	Ernest Untermann
Party	Republican	Socialist
Popular vote	254,159	56,805
Percentage	28.69%	6.41%
- County results Phelan: 30–40% 40–50% 50–60% Heney: 30–40% Knowland: 20–30% 30–40% 40–50%
U.S. senator before election
George Clement Perkins
Republican
Elected U.S. Senator
James Duval Phelan
Democratic

The 1914 United States Senate election in California was held on November 3, 1914. Incumbent Republican Senator George Clement Perkins did not run for re-election.

In a three-way race, Democratic former mayor of San Francisco James Duval Phelan defeated Progressive attorney Francis J. Heney and Republican U.S. Representative Joseph R. Knowland.

== Republican primary ==
=== Candidates ===
- Joseph R. Knowland, U.S. Representative from Oakland
- Samuel Morgan Shortridge, attorney
- Francis J. Heney (Progressive), former Attorney General for the Arizona Territory (cross-filing)
- Chester Harvey Rowell (Progressive), member of the Panama–Pacific International Exposition Commission (cross-filing)
- James Duval Phelan (Democratic), former mayor of San Francisco (cross-filing)
- Thomas F. Griffin (Democratic), State Assemblyman (cross-filing)

=== Results ===
1914 Republican Senate primary
Party	Candidate	Votes	%
Republican	Joseph R. Knowland	135,598	55.39%
Republican	Samuel Morgan Shortridge	105,531	43.11%
Progressive	Francis J. Heney (cross-filing)	2,467	1.01%
Progressive	Chester H. Rowell (cross-filing)	670	0.27%
Democratic	James Duval Phelan (cross-filing)	403	0.16%
Democratic	Thomas F. Griffin (cross-filing)	123	0.05%
Total votes		244,792	100.00%

== Democratic primary ==
=== Candidates ===
- James Duval Phelan (Democratic), former mayor of San Francisco
- Thomas F. Griffin (Democratic), State Assemblyman
- Francis J. Heney (Progressive), former Attorney General for the Arizona Territory (cross-filing)
- Joseph R. Knowland, U.S. Representative from Oakland (cross-filing)
- Samuel Morgan Shortridge, attorney (cross-filing)
- Chester Harvey Rowell (Progressive), member of the Panama–Pacific International Exposition Commission (cross-filing)

=== Results ===
1914 Democratic Senate primary
Party	Candidate	Votes	%
Democratic	James Duval Phelan	88,378	71.30%
Democratic	Thomas F. Griffin	34,135	27.54%
Progressive	Francis J. Heney (cross-filing)	763	0.62%
Republican	Joseph R. Knowland (cross-filing)	322	0.26%
Republican	Samuel Morgan Shortridge (cross-filing)	182	0.15%
Progressive	Chester H. Rowell (cross-filing)	172	0.14%
Total votes		123,952	100.00%

== Progressive primary ==
=== Candidates ===
- Francis J. Heney (Progressive), former Attorney General for the Arizona Territory
- Chester Harvey Rowell (Progressive), member of the Panama–Pacific International Exposition Commission
- Joseph R. Knowland, U.S. Representative from Oakland (cross-filing)
- Samuel Morgan Shortridge, attorney (cross-filing)
- James Duval Phelan (Democratic), former mayor of San Francisco (cross-filing)
- Thomas F. Griffin (Democratic), State Assemblyman (cross-filing)

=== Results ===
1914 Progressive Senate primary
Party	Candidate	Votes	%
Progressive	Francis J. Heney	78,359	68.91%
Progressive	Chester H. Rowell	33,575	29.52%
Republican	Joseph R. Knowland (cross-filing)	1,332	1.17%
Republican	Samuel Morgan Shortridge (cross-filing)	194	0.17%
Democratic	James Duval Phelan (cross-filing)	194	0.17%
Democratic	Thomas F. Griffin (cross-filing)	64	0.06%
Total votes		113,718	100.00%

== General election ==
=== Candidates ===
- Francis J. Heney (Progressive), former Attorney General for the Arizona Territory
- James Duval Phelan (Democratic), former mayor of San Francisco
- Joseph R. Knowland (Republican), U.S. Representative from Oakland
- Ernest Untermann (Socialist), nominee for Governor of Idaho in 1908
- Frederick F. Wheeler (Prohibition), nominee for California's 7th congressional district in 1902

=== Results ===
1914 United States Senate election in California
Party	Candidate	Votes	%
Democratic	James Duval Phelan	279,896	31.59%
Progressive	Francis J. Heney	255,232	28.81%
Republican	Joseph R. Knowland	254,159	28.69%
Socialist	Ernest Untermann	56,805	6.41%
Prohibition	Frederick F. Wheeler	39,921	4.51%
Total votes		886,013	100.00%

== See also ==
- 1914 United States Senate elections
