= William E. Dargie =

American politician

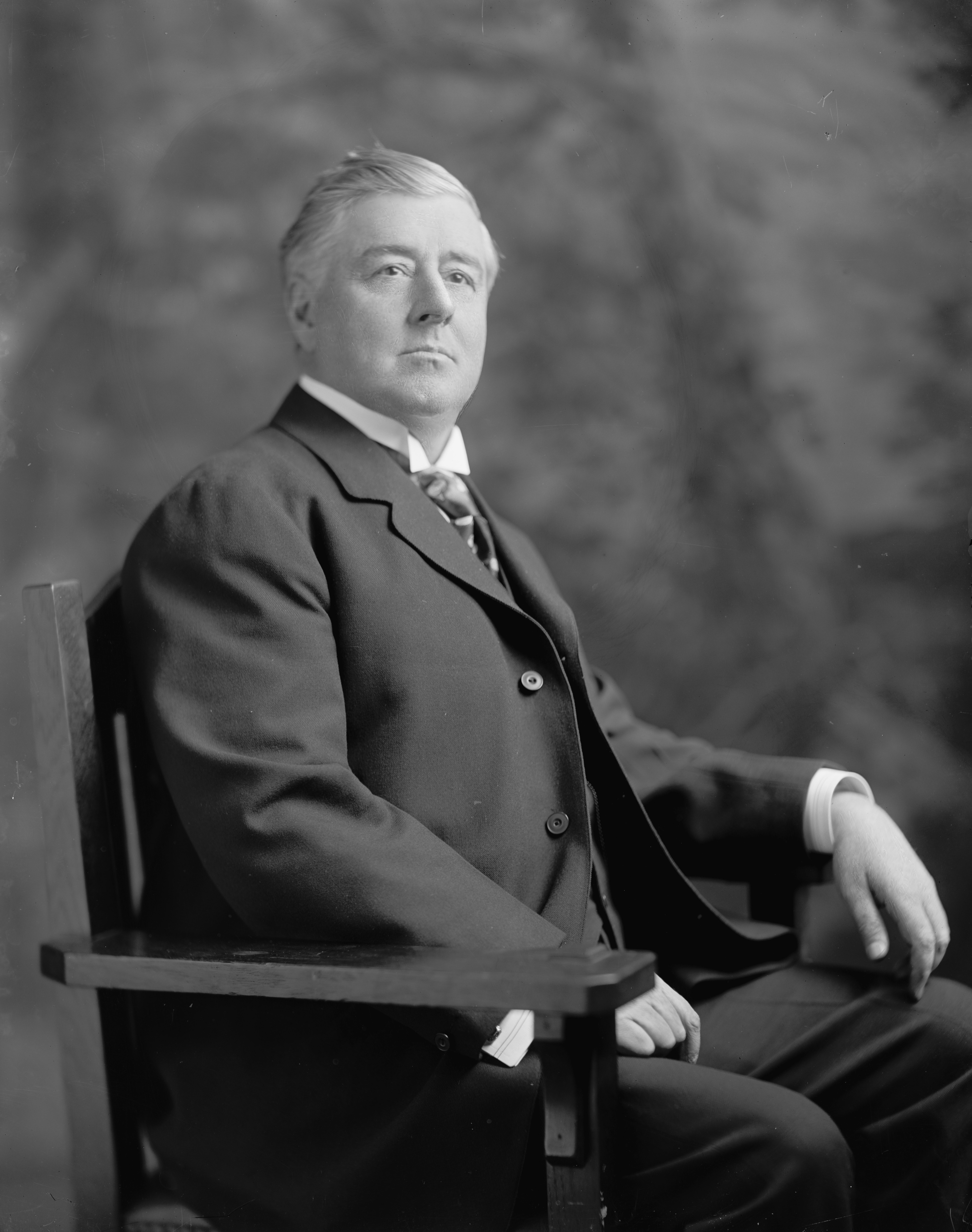
- Portrait by Harris & Ewing c. 1905–1911

Member of the California Senate from the 17th district
- In office January 7, 1889 - January 2, 1893
- Preceded by: Henry Vrooman
- Succeeded by: William J. Dunn

Personal details
- Born: March 13, 1854 San Francisco, California, U.S.
- Died: February 10, 1911 (aged 56) Oakland, California, U.S.
- Party: Republican
- Spouse: Herminia Peralta
- Children: 1
- Occupation: Publisher

William Edward Dargie (March 13, 1854 – February 10, 1911) was an American newspaper publisher and politician.

== Early life ==
Born in San Francisco, California, to John and Eliza G. Dargie. He graduated from Union Grammar School, one year he attended San Francisco High School. In 1867, Dargie, secured the position of bill clerk with the wholesale wood firm of Armes & Dallam. Dargie became an apprentice in the printer's trade at the San Francisco Bulletin, becoming a member of the International Typographical Union's, San Francisco Local # 21. As a journeyman printer, Dargie learned all the operations and jobs in the composing room. He was transferred to the editorial department as a reporter for the Bulletin.

== Career ==
=== Oakland Tribune ===
In 1875, Dargie decided to better his education and entered the new University of California at Berkeley. He continued to work as a reporter for the San Francisco Bulletin. Dargie's salary from the Bulletin paid his university expenses. After his freshman year at the university, Dargie purchased controlling interest in the Oakland Tribune with a loan from A. K. P. (Albion Keith Paris) Harmon. On July 24, 1876, Dargie became the manager of the newspaper.

He envisioned that Oakland and Alameda County would grow in the future and that the Oakland Tribune would be the major newspaper to serve the new populace. Using his knowledge from the composing room and editorial department, Dargie tried to improve the Tribune. He hired more staff and purchased new presses and linotype machines.

=== Politics ===
Dargie in the San Francisco News Letter, November 3, 1888

On February 27, 1883, President Chester A. Arthur appointed Dargie, a Republican, to the post of Postmaster of Oakland. When his term as postmaster ended in 1888, Dargie ran for the California State Senate for the 17th district. He represented Alameda County in the California State Senate from 1889 to 1891. During his political career, Dargie continued as publisher of the Oakland Tribune.

== Personal life ==
On December 15, 1881, Dargie married Hermina Peralta at San Leandro, California in the home of the bride's father Miguel Peralta. The couple's daughter died at birth, their son, William Edward Dargie, Jr. died at age 20. Dargie died in Oakland, California from the effects of a nervous breakdown and stroke. The California State Senate adjourned in honor of William E. Dargie. State Senator John W. Stetson of Alameda County praised the work of William E. Dargie. His widow, Hermina would be involved in a long legal battle over the purchase of the Oakland Tribune with former U.S. Congressman Joseph R. Knowland.

The Peralta-Dargie Family have two large burial plots one located at Saint Mary Cemetery, and another at Mountain View Cemetery, both in Oakland.

== Memberships ==
- Mason, A. F & A. M.
- Athenian and Nile Clubs
- Union Club
- Family Club
- Press Club of San Francisco
