= 1946 United States Senate elections in California =

1946 United States Senate election in California
- November 5, 1946
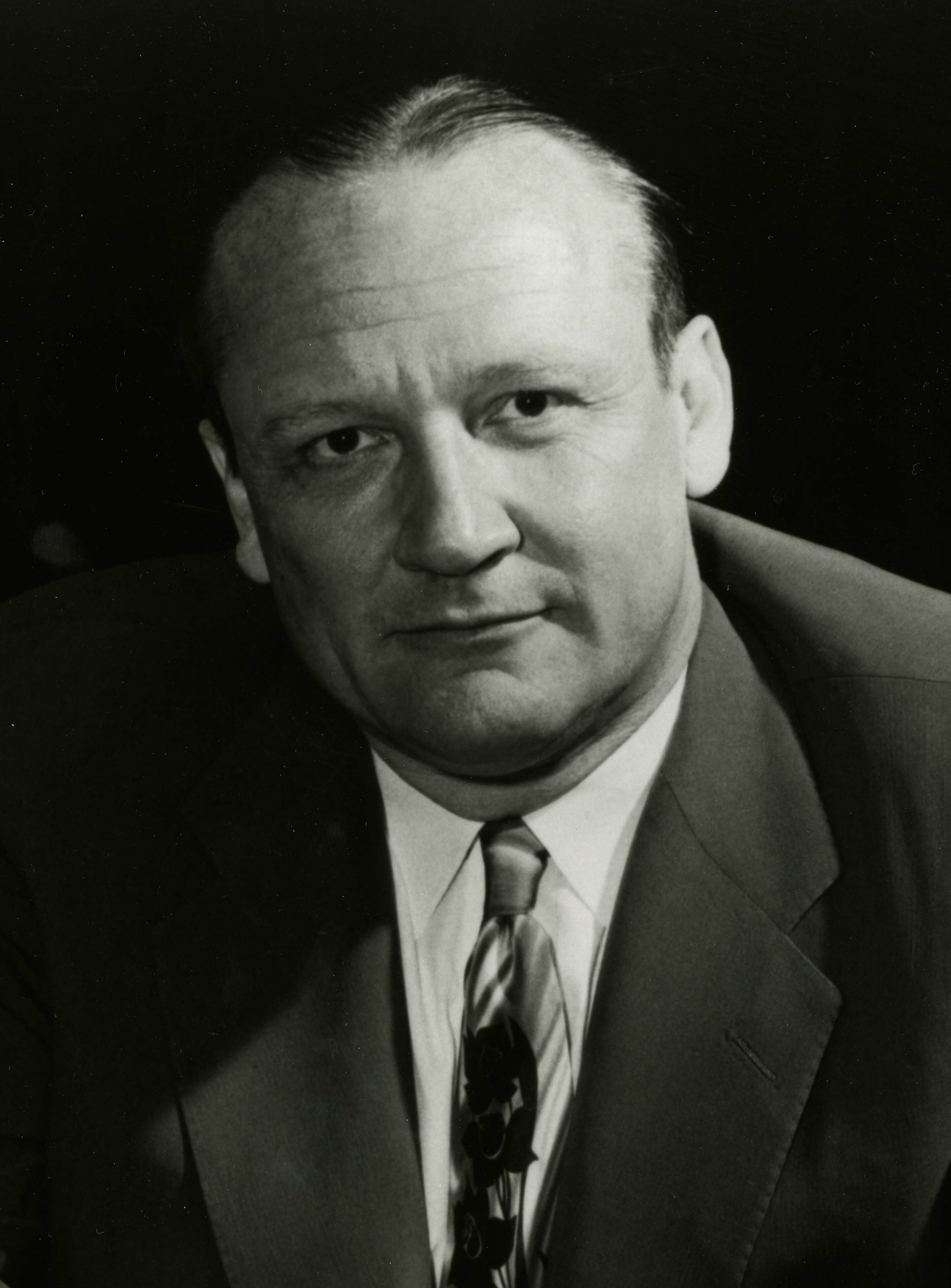

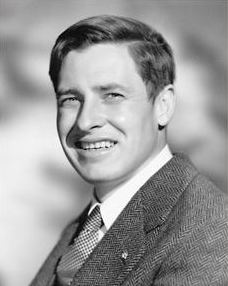
| Nominee | William Knowland | Will Rogers Jr. |
| Party | Republican | Democratic |
| Popular vote | 1,428,067 | 1,167,161 |
| Percentage | 54.10% | 44.22% |
- County results Knowland: 40–50% 50–60% 60–70% 70–80% Rogers: 50–60%
U.S. senator before election
William F. Knowland
Republican
Elected U.S. Senator
William F. Knowland
Republican

The two 1946 United States Senate elections in California were held concurrently on November 5, 1946.

After incumbent Republican Senator Hiram Johnson died in office in August 1945, Governor Earl Warren appointed U.S. Army Major and former State Senator William F. Knowland to finish Johnson's term until a successor could be duly elected. Knowland won both the special election to complete Johnson's term, and the regularly scheduled 1946 election, over former U.S. Representative Will Rogers Jr., both held on November 5.

== Republican primary ==
=== Candidates ===
- William F. Knowland, incumbent Senator since 1945

=== Results ===
1946 Republican U.S. Senate primary
| Party | Candidate | Votes | % |
|---|---|---|---|
| Republican | William F. Knowland (inc.) | 514,667 | 64.80% |
| Democratic | Will Rogers Jr. (cross-filing) | 203,436 | 25.61% |
| Democratic | Ellis E. Patterson (cross-filing) | 76,151 | 9.59% |
| Total votes | | 794,254 | 100.00 |

== Democratic primary ==
=== Candidates ===
- John S. Crowder
- Adam C. Derkum
- Wayne McFarland
- Ellis Patterson, U.S. Representative and former Lieutenant Governor of California
- Will Rogers Jr., former U.S. Representative from Culver City and son of humorist Will Rogers

=== Results ===
1946 Democratic U.S. Senate primary
| Party | Candidate | Votes | % |
|---|---|---|---|
| Democratic | Will Rogers Jr. | 501,634 | 47.45% |
| Democratic | Ellis Patterson | 286,812 | 27.13% |
| Republican | William F. Knowland (inc.) (cross-filing) | 226,182 | 21.40% |
| Democratic | Wayne McFarland | 17,774 | 1.68% |
| Democratic | John S. Crowder | 17,156 | 1.62% |
| Democratic | Adam C. Derkum | 7,578 | 0.72% |
| Total votes | | 1,057,136 | 100.00 |

== General election ==
=== Results ===
General election results
| Party | Candidate | Votes | % |
|---|---|---|---|
| Republican | William F. Knowland (inc.) | 1,428,067 | 54.10% |
| Democratic | Will Rogers Jr. | 1,167,161 | 44.22% |
| Prohibition | Douglas Corrigan | 42,683 | 1.62% |
| Socialist Labor | Herbert Steiner (write-in) | 156 | 0.01% |
| Write-in | All others | 1,398 | 0.05% |
| Total votes | | 2,639,465 | 100.00% |

== Special election ==
In a simultaneous special election for the remainder of Johnson's term, Knowland won easily. Notably, no candidates were listed on the ballot. Each vote was a write-in, making Knowland technically the first ever write-in candidate elected to the U.S. Senate. In 1954, Strom Thurmond became the first candidate to win a Senate election by write-in where another candidate was actually listed on the ballot.

=== Results ===
1946 U.S. Senate special election in California
| Party | Candidate | Votes | % |
|---|---|---|---|
| Write-in | William F. Knowland (inc.) | 425,273 | 74.31% |
| Write-in | Will Rogers Jr. | 90,723 | 15.85% |
| Write-in | George H. McLain | 17,883 | 3.13% |
| Write-in | Ellis E. Patterson | 3,889 | 0.68% |
| Write-in | Douglas Corrigan | 2,464 | 0.43% |
| Write-in | Vic Paulsen | 1,616 | 0.28% |
| Write-in | Moody Staten | 1,494 | 0.26% |
| Write-in | Hartley F. Peart | 1,383 | 0.24% |
| Write-in | George C. Highley | 1,268 | 0.22% |
| Write-in | James Moran | 918 | 0.16% |
| Write-in | Ben Rinaldo | 765 | 0.13% |
| Write-in | Aubrey D. Lewis | 519 | 0.09% |
| Write-in | Frank Merriam | 507 | 0.09% |
| Write-in | All others | 23,619 | 4.13% |
| Total votes | | 572,321 | 100.00% |

== See also ==
- 1946 United States Senate elections
