= Knowland =

Knowland is a surname. Notable people with the surname include:

- George Arthur Knowland VC (1922–1945), English recipient of the Victoria Cross during the Second World War
- Joe Knowland (1930–2019), actor from Oakland, California
- Joseph Knowland (1833–1912), father of U.S. Representative Joseph Russell Knowland, grandfather of U.S. Senator William Fife Knowland
- Joseph R. Knowland (1873–1966), American politician and newspaper publisher
- Tony Knowland (1919–2006), professor of English literature
- William F. Knowland (1908–1974), United States politician, newspaperman, and Republican Party leader

== See also ==
- Joseph Knowland State Arboretum and Park, park located in Oakland, California
