= Will Rogers Jr. =

American politician (1911–1993)

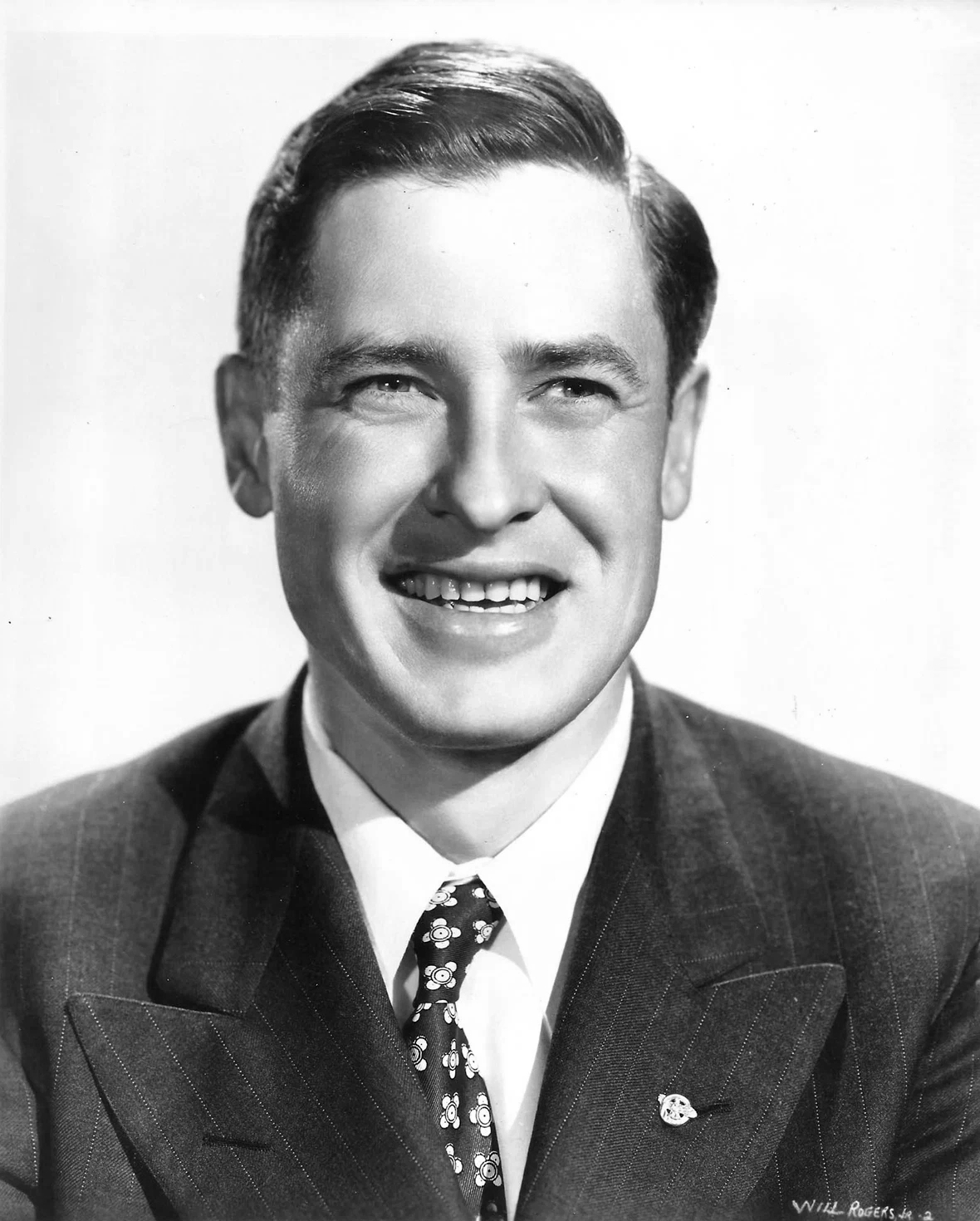
- Rogers c. 1952

Member of the U.S. House of Representatives from California's 16th district
- In office January 3, 1943 – May 23, 1944
- Preceded by: Leland M. Ford
- Succeeded by: Ellis E. Patterson

Personal details
- Born: William Vann Rogers; October 20, 1911 New York City, U.S.
- Died: July 9, 1993 (aged 81) Tubac, Arizona, U.S.
- Citizenship: American; Cherokee Nation
- Party: Democratic
- Spouse: Collier Connell (m. 1941)
- Children: Clem Adair and Carl Connell
- Parent: Will Rogers (father)
- Relatives: Mary Amelia Rogers (sister), Jimmy Rogers (brother), Fred Stone Rogers (brother)
- Education: Stanford University (BA)

Military service
- Allegiance: United States
- Branch/service: U.S. Army
- Years of service: 1942–1946
- Rank: Lieutenant
- Unit: 893rd Tank Destroyer Battalion; 814th Tank Destroyer Battalion
- Battles/wars: World War II; Western Front; Battle of the Bulge (WIA)
- Awards: Bronze Star

William Vann Rogers (October 20, 1911 - July 9, 1993), generally known as Will Rogers Jr., was an American politician, writer, and newspaper publisher. He was a Democratic U.S. representative from California from January 3, 1943, until May 23, 1944, when he resigned to return to the United States Army.

== Early life and military service ==
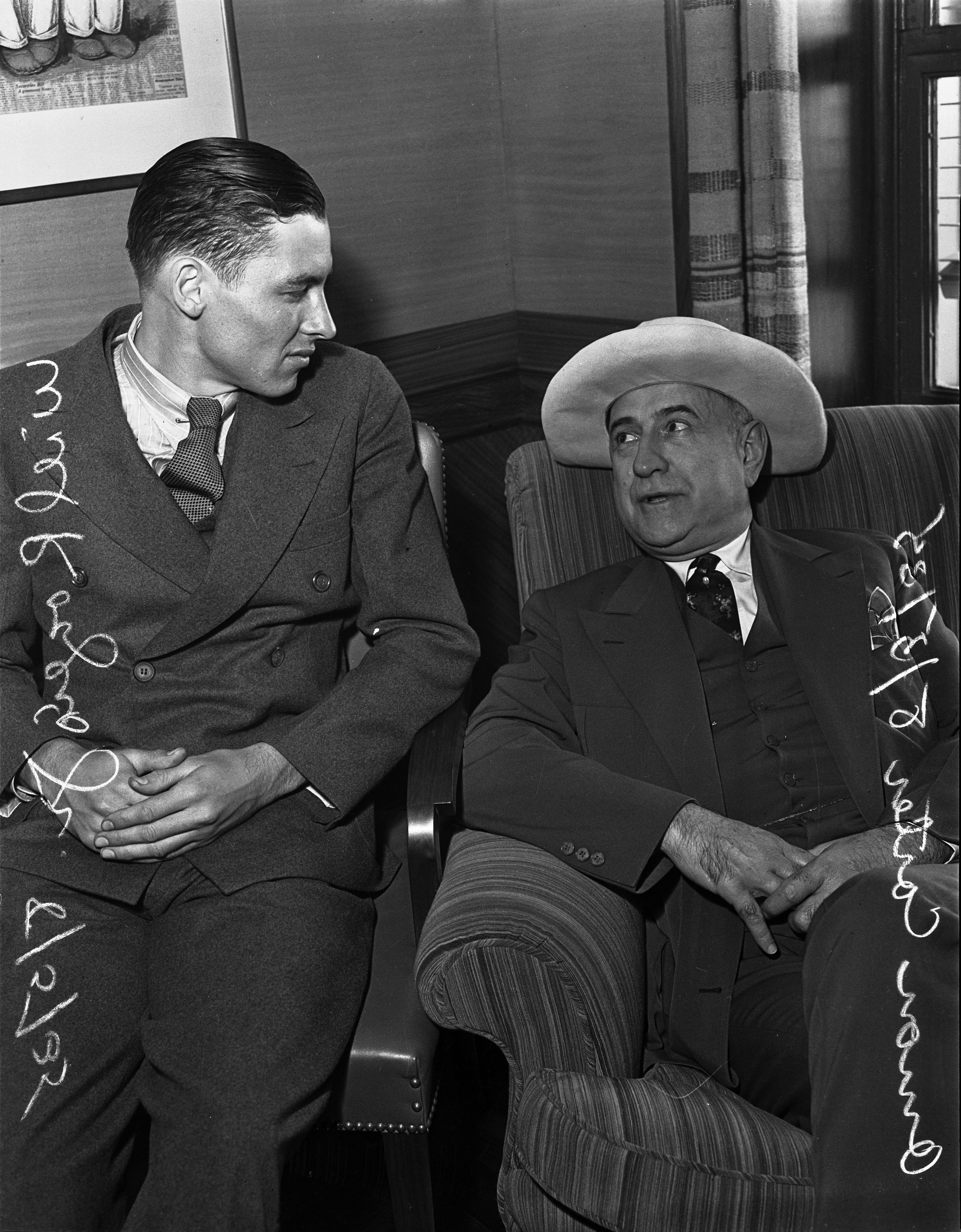
Rogers (left) with newspaper publisher Amon G. Carter, August 5, 1935

Rogers was the eldest son of humorist Will Rogers and Betty Blake Rogers. He was born in New York City, where his father was performing. He grew up in Los Angeles, and attended school there. He received a Bachelor of Arts degree from Stanford University in 1935. On completing his studies, he served as publisher of the Beverly Hills Citizen newspaper, a role in which he continued until 1953.

During the Spanish Civil War, Rogers visited the country to show his support for the Republican government and the Abraham Lincoln Brigade. During his stay in Barcelona, he survived a Nationalist air raid that blew the windows out of his hotel room.

On May 26, 1941, he married Collier "Colly" Connell in Las Vegas, Nevada.

Rogers had been commissioned a second lieutenant through the Reserve Officers' Training Corps, but did not go on active duty. With U.S. entry into World War II, however, he enlisted as a private in June 1942, and was commissioned in the field artillery the following month and assigned to the 893rd Tank Destroyer Battalion.

== Congress and return to active duty ==
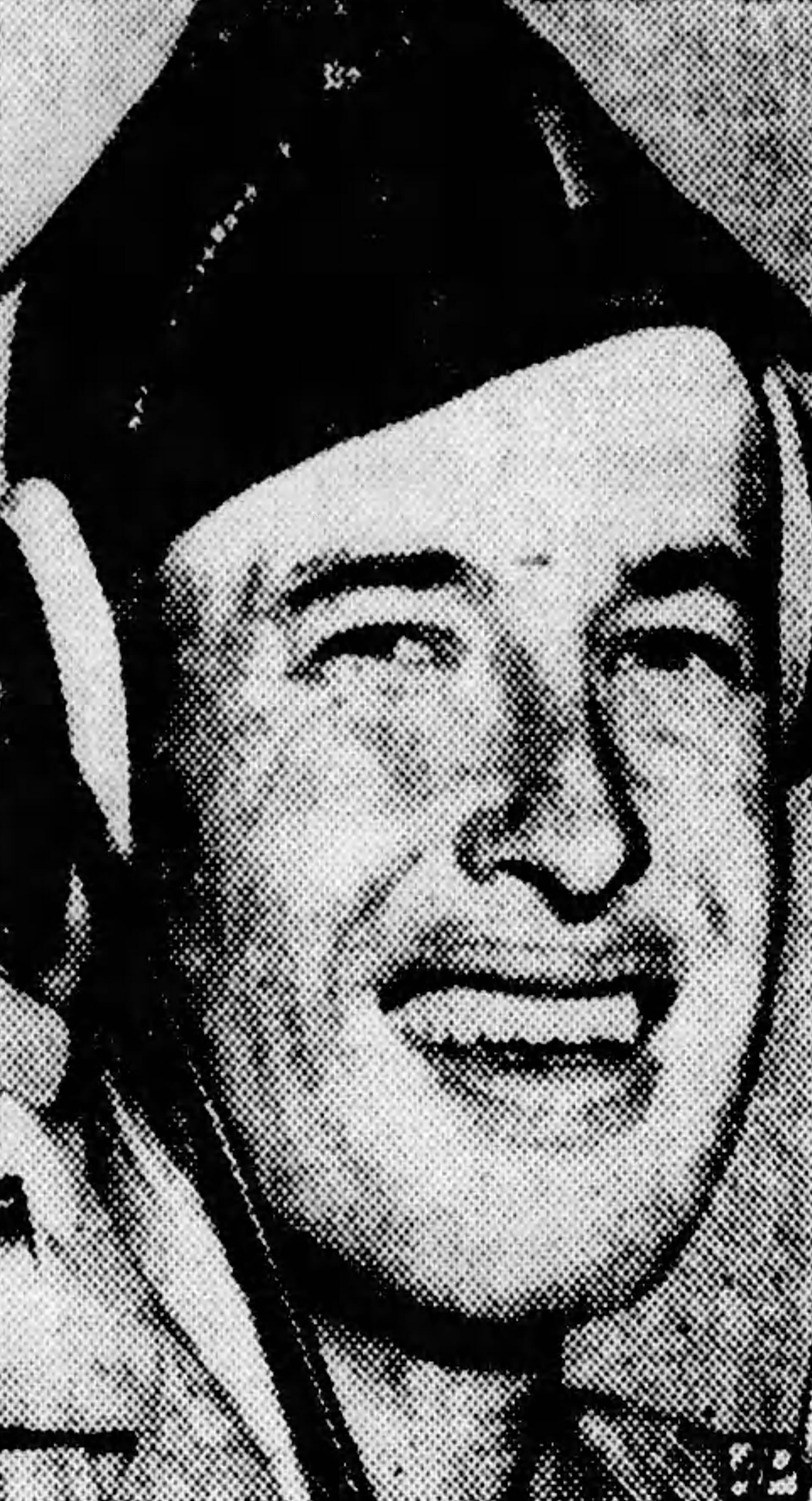
Rogers in his U.S. Army uniform c. 1942–1946

While on active duty, Rogers was elected to the House of Representatives from California, and was sworn into office on January 3, 1943. He served in the 78th Congress. He did not complete his term, however, returning to active duty in the Army after resigning from Congress on May 23, 1944.

As part of his confidential 1943 report for the British government about the United States House Committee on Foreign Affairs, Foreign Office analyst Isaiah Berlin described Rogers's political leanings and his prospective post-war positions regarding world order and, more specifically, the British Empire:

A new-comer to the House. Son of a very celebrated father. A sincere and somewhat impassioned young man who believes strongly in the Wallace type of internationalism and in cooperation with the United Nations. A trifle callow and politically inexperienced, he will undoubtedly be a vigorous and enthusiastic champion of all-out post-war co-operation with the United Nations. His fervent adherence to the liberal ideals of the "New Republic" may tend to make him critical of the British Empire.

After his resignation, Rogers was assigned to the 814th Tank Destroyer Battalion and served in the European campaign in George Patton's Third United States Army. Rogers was wounded in action and also received a Bronze Star. He was released from active duty with the rank of lieutenant on March 1, 1946.

== Postwar politics ==
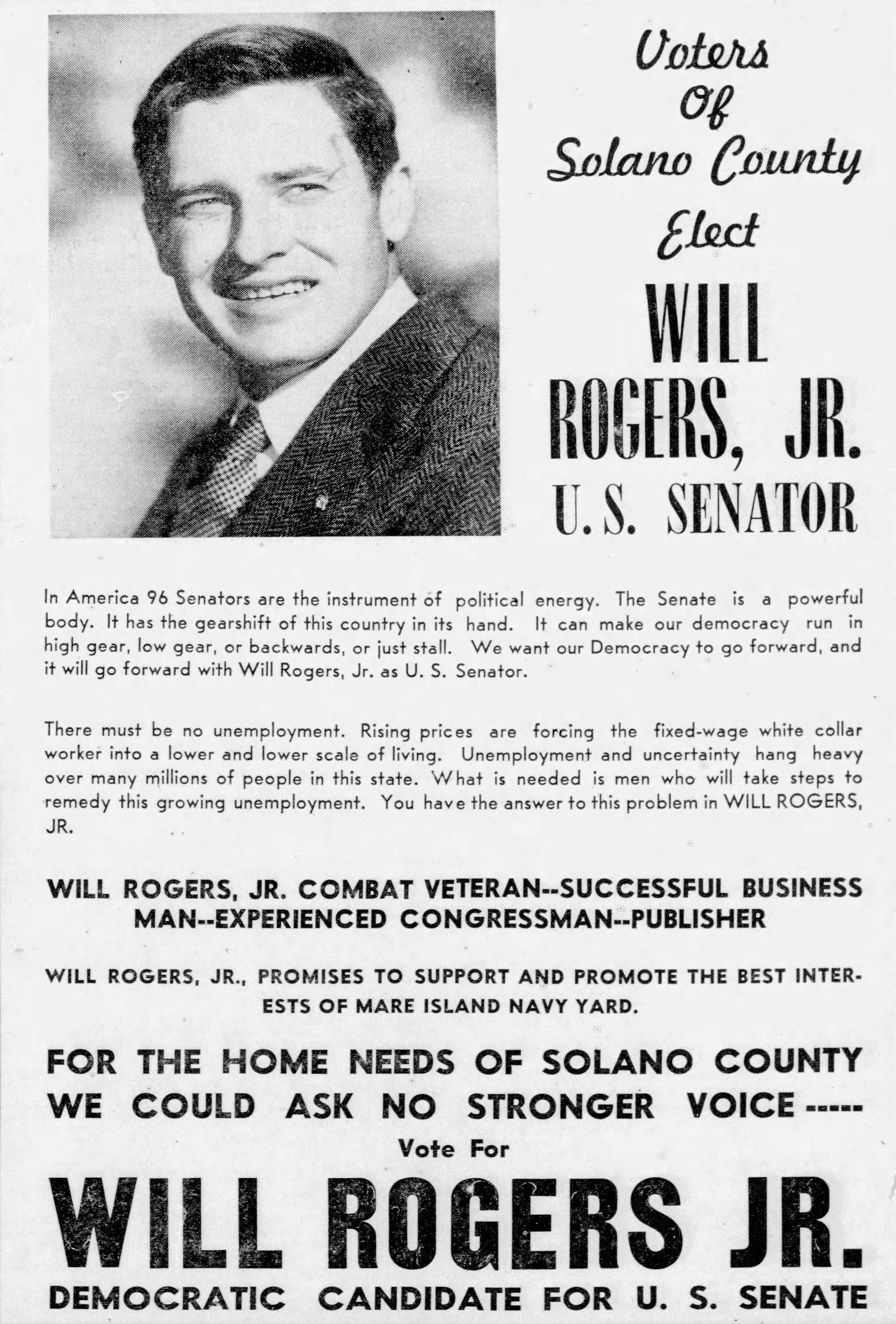
Advertisement for Rogers's Senate candidacy published in the Vallejo Times Herald, October 30, 1946

Rogers ran for U.S. Senate in 1946, challenging incumbent William Knowland, who had been appointed by Governor Earl Warren in August of the previous year to fill the vacancy caused by the death of Hiram Johnson. California held two elections involving the seat: a special election (with blank ballots) for filling out the remainder of Johnson's term (to 1947) and a full six-year term. Knowland won the special election handily over Rogers among an array of other write-ins and won a full term in the general election by over 200,000 votes.

After this, Rogers Jr. managed the Southern California presidential campaign for Harry S. Truman in 1948. He was a delegate to the Democratic National Convention in 1948, 1952, and 1956. He participated in government service, serving as a member of the California State Parks Commission (1958–1962, chairman 1960–1962). Proud of his Cherokee heritage, he served as a special assistant to the Commission on Indian Affairs during the Johnson administration from 1967 to 1969.

== Acting ==
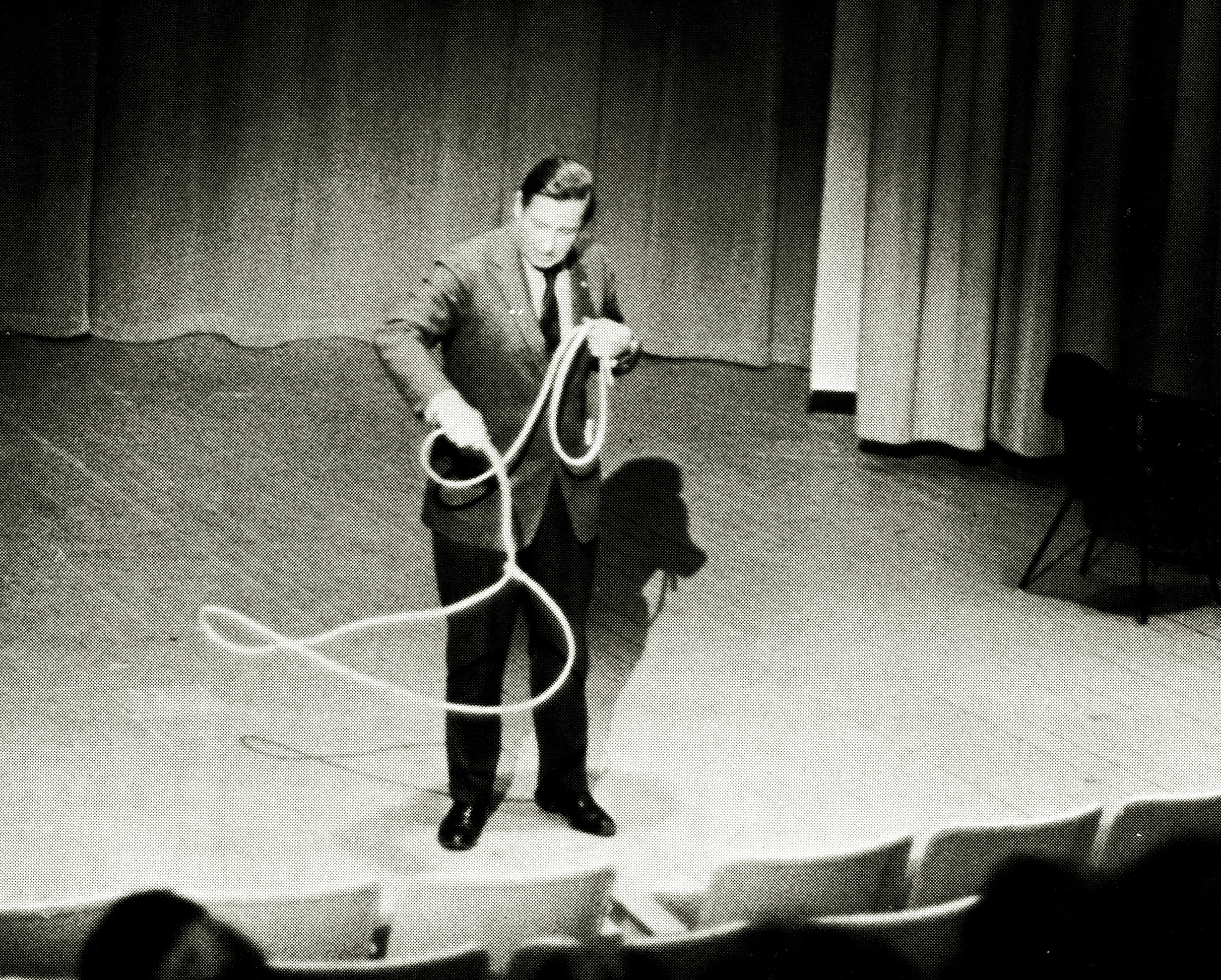
Rogers at Alaska Methodist University during the 1967–1968 academic year, showing attendees his skill with a lasso.

Rogers had a minor career as an actor and was most noted for playing his father (whom he closely resembled), particularly in The Story of Will Rogers (1952) and The Eddie Cantor Story (1953). As a character actor he starred in The Boy from Oklahoma, a 1954 Western film directed by Michael Curtiz (the basis for the 1957 television series Sugarfoot). He appeared in Wild Heritage (1958) as a judge, and also appeared frequently in the 1950s television anthology series Schlitz Playhouse of Stars.

During the 1953–54 season, he starred in Rogers of the Gazette for CBS Radio, as the owner of a small-town newspaper. Also from 1956 to 1957, he hosted the weekday-morning (7:00 a.m.) Good Morning show on CBS Television, but was replaced by Jimmy Dean. He was one of several actors as well to host syndicated reruns of the television anthology series Death Valley Days, with the episodes he hosted airing under the title The Pioneers.

In 1982 he provided the voice for the audio-animatronic figure of his father in the The American Adventure attraction at Disney's Epcot in Florida, which continues to run to this day.

== Later years and death ==
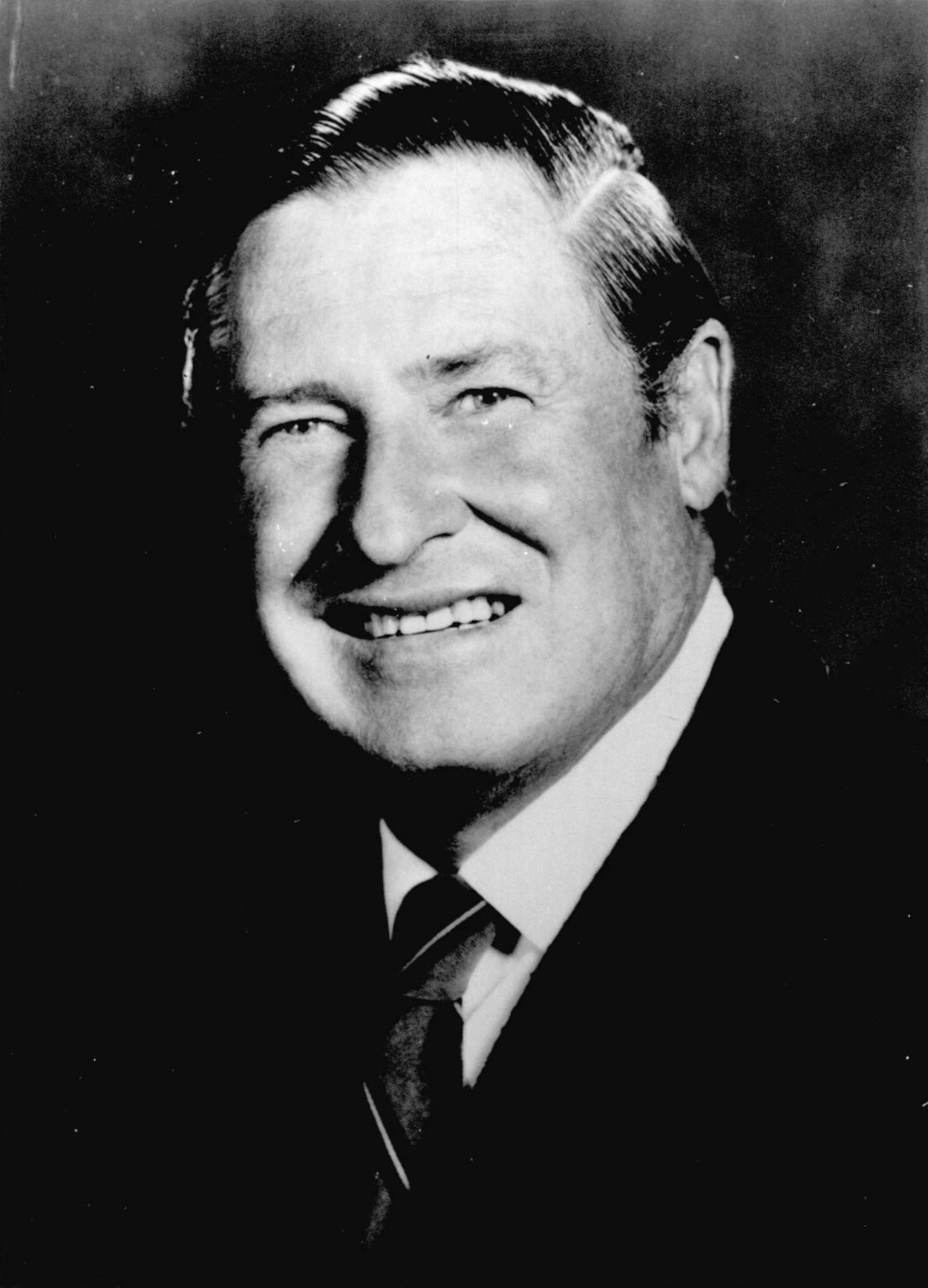
Rogers c. 1971

Rogers' wife Collier died on June 12, 1976.

Rogers retired to his ranch at Tubac, Arizona. In poor health after suffering several strokes, having heart problems, and having had hip replacements, Rogers died by suicide in 1993 at the age of 81. His body was found in his car near the ranch with a self-inflicted gunshot wound. He was buried next to his wife in the Tubac Cemetery. Rogers was survived by his two sons, Clem Adair Rogers and Carl Connell Rogers and his brother, James Rogers.

== Electoral history ==
United States House of Representatives elections, 1942
Party	Candidate	Votes	%
Democratic	Will Rogers Jr.	61,437	53.7
Republican	Leland M. Ford (incumbent)	52,023	45.4
Communist	Allen L. Ryan	1,043	0.9
Total votes		114,503	100.0
Turnout			
Democratic gain from Republican			

=== Results ===
1946 U.S. Senate special election in California
Party	Candidate	Votes	%
Write-in	William F. Knowland (inc.)	425,273	74.31%
Write-in	Will Rogers Jr.	90,723	15.85%
Write-in	George H. McLain	17,883	3.13%
Write-in	Ellis E. Patterson	3,889	0.68%
Write-in	Douglas Corrigan	2,464	0.43%
Write-in	Vic Paulsen	1,616	0.28%
Write-in	Moody Staten	1,494	0.26%
Write-in	Hartley F. Peart	1,383	0.24%
Write-in	George C. Highley	1,268	0.22%
Write-in	James Moran	918	0.16%
Write-in	Ben Rinaldo	765	0.13%
Write-in	Aubrey D. Lewis	519	0.09%
Write-in	Frank Merriam	507	0.09%
Write-in	All others	23,619	4.13%
Total votes		572,321	100.00%

General election results
Party	Candidate	Votes	%
Republican	William F. Knowland (inc.)	1,428,067	54.10%
Democratic	Will Rogers Jr.	1,167,161	44.22%
Prohibition	Douglas Corrigan	42,683	1.62%
Socialist Labor	Herbert Steiner (write-in)	156	0.01%
Write-in	All others	1,398	0.05%
Total votes		2,639,465	100.00%

== See also ==
- List of Native Americans in the United States Congress

== Bibliography ==
- Johnston, Lyle (2019). Standing on the Shadow: The Will Rogers, Jr. Story. Privately printed.

U.S. House of Representatives
Preceded by Leland M. Ford	Member of the U.S. House of Representatives from California's 16th congressional district 1943–1944	Succeeded by Ellis E. Patterson
Party political offices
Preceded by Hiram Johnson; Endorsed	Democratic nominee for U.S. Senator from California (Class 1); 1946	Succeeded by William Knowland; Endorsed
