= George H. McLain =

American politician (1901–1965)

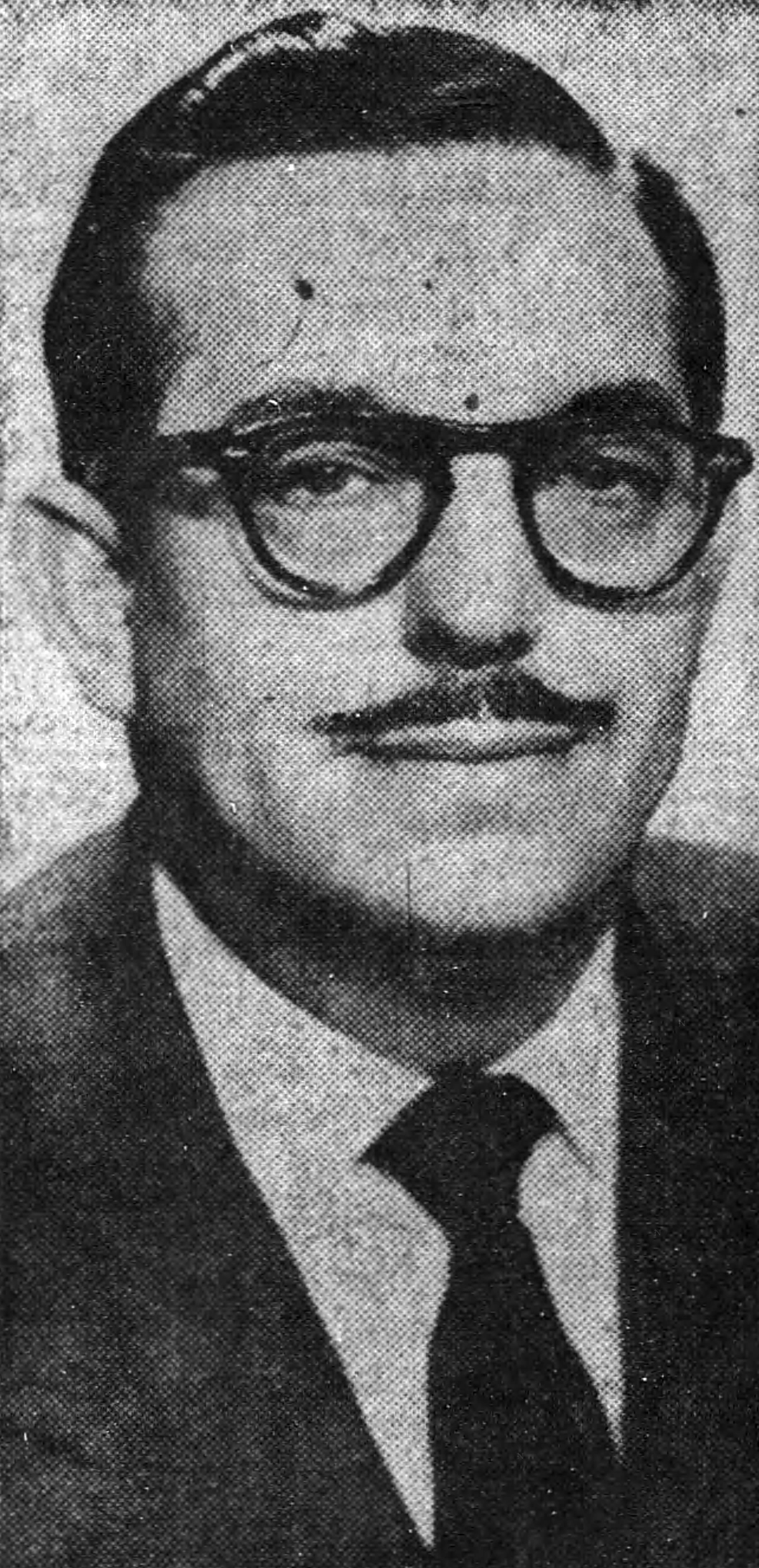
McLain c. 1949

George H. McLain (June 24, 1901 – July 12, 1965) was a United States Democratic politician from California and an influential pension promoter from the 1930s through the early 1950s.

== Career ==
McLain began his political career campaigning on behalf of 1934 California gubernatorial candidate Upton Sinclair, before turning to social organizing. He formed a nativist organization called "Natives of California, Inc." in 1936, whose avowed purpose was "to return the government of California to the natives of the state, and keep it there," a reaction to the large number of migrants from the Great Plains who had arrived during the Depression. In the early forties, McLain gained control of an organization that would become the California Institute of Social Welfare and McLain's main platform for political organizing. In 1949, he was accused of bribing state lawmakers, but the case was dismissed the following year by California's Third District Court of Appeal.

After leading a series of ballot proposition campaigns that all failed in the early 1950s, McLain largely retreated from public life, save to run for federal office twice in the early sixties.

McLain may be best known for running in California's Democratic presidential primary in 1960. He was the only opponent of the heavily favored favorite son candidate, Governor Pat Brown. McLain lost to Brown, but, because of the large number of votes cast in California, and the small number of primaries overall, he finished third in total number of votes cast in all Democratic primaries, just behind eventual nominee John F. Kennedy and Brown, even though he ran only in California.

McLain ran unsuccessfully, at various times, for the Los Angeles School Board, the City Council and Mayor of Los Angeles; the State Assembly and State Senate, and California's 23rd Congressional District. He also ran twice for the United States Senate: as a Democratic write-in in a 1946 special election and for his party's nomination in 1964, losing both times.

== Personal ==
McLain married three times, with his second marriage to Rose C. McLain ending in a contested divorce in 1961. Circa 1962 he married Elenor Yorke, a poet, to whom he stayed married until his sudden death in 1965.

== Electoral history (incomplete) ==
California special United States Senate election, 1946:

- William F. Knowland (R) (inc.) - 425,273 (74.31%)
- Will Rogers, Jr. (D) (write-in) - 90,723 (15.85%)
- George H. McLain (D) (write-in) - 17,883 (3.13%)
- Ellis E. Patterson (D) (write-in) - 3,889 (0.68%)
- Douglas Corrigan (Prohibition) (write-in) - 2,464 (0.43%)
- Vic Paulsen (I) (write-in) - 1,616 (0.28%)
- Others write-ins - 26,328 (4.60%)

Democratic presidential primary in California, 1960

- Pat Brown - 1,354,031 (67.69%)
- George H. McLain - 646,387 (32.31%)

Democratic Party (United States) presidential primaries, 1960

- John F. Kennedy - 1,847,259 (31.43%)
- Pat Brown - 1,354,031 (23.04%)
- George H. McLain - 646,387 (11.00%)
- Hubert Humphrey - 590,410 (10.05%)
- George Smathers - 322,235 (5.48%)
- Michael DiSalle - 315,312 (5.37%)
- Unpledged delegates - 241,958 (4.12%)
- Wayne Morse - 147,262 (2.51%)
- Adlai Stevenson - 51,833 (0.88%)

Democratic primaries for U.S. Senate, 1964:

- Pierre Salinger - 1,177,517 (44.26%)
- Alan Cranston - 1,037,748 (39.01%)
- George H. McLain - 180,405 (6.78%)
- Clair Engle (inc.) - 119,967 (4.51%)
- Lynn W. Johnston - 43,744 (1.64%)
- Walter R. Buchanan - 24,093 (0.91%)
- Harold E. Fields - 16,061 (0.60%)
- Demos Cordiero - 15,696 (0.59%)
- Mark Morris - 12,357 (0.46%)
- Emanuel Braude - 10,064 (0.38%)
- Henry A. Mermel - 6,092 (0.23%)
