= Nowlan =

Nowlan is a surname. Notable people with the surname include:

- Alden Nowlan (1933–1983), Canadian poet, novelist, and playwright
- Cherie Nowlan (née Singleton), Australian film and television director, known for the 2007 film Clubland
- George Nowlan, PC (1898–1965), Canadian member of Parliament and Cabinet Minister
- James Nowlan (1862–1924), President of the Gaelic Athletic Association (GAA) from 1901 to 1921
- James William Nowlan (1818–1900), political figure in New Brunswick, Canada
- John Nowlan (1821–1895), Irish-born Australian politician
- Kevin Nowlan (born 1958), American comic-book artist
- Lawrence Nowlan (1965–2013), American sculptor and figurative artist
- Max Nowlan (born 1939), former Australian rules footballer
- Pat Nowlan (born 1931), Canadian parliamentarian and son of Diefenbaker-era Minister of Finance George Nowlan
- Patrick Nowlan (1827–1896), merchant and political figure in Newfoundland
- Philip Francis Nowlan (1888–1940), American science fiction author, best known as the creator of Buck Rogers

== See also ==
- Lovejoy and Merrill-Nowlan Houses, located in the Courthouse Hill Historic District in Janesville, Wisconsin
- Nowlan Park, Gaelic Athletic Association stadium in Kilkenny, Ireland
- Knowland
- Nolan (surname)
- Olan (disambiguation)
