= The Flying Irishman =

1939 film

- Directed by: Leigh Jason
- Written by: Ernest Pagano; Dalton Trumbo
- Starring: Douglas Corrigan
- Cinematography: J. Roy Hunt
- Edited by: Arthur E. Roberts
- Music by: Roy Webb
- Production companies: RKO Radio Pictures, Inc.
- Distributed by: RKO Pictures
- Release date: April 7, 1939
- Running time: 91 minutes
- Country: United States
- Language: English

The Flying Irishman (aka Born to Fly) is a 1939 biographical drama film produced by RKO Pictures about Douglas Corrigan's unofficial transatlantic flight the previous year in a dilapidated Curtiss Robin light aircraft. The film was directed by Leigh Jason based on a screenplay by Ernest Pagano and Dalton Trumbo.

The Flying Irishman covers the material of Corrigan's 1938 autobiography, That's My Story, from his early life to his return from his wrong-way flight. Because of the huge popularity of Corrigan and his flight, the screenplay assumes that the material is already familiar to its audience.

== Plot ==
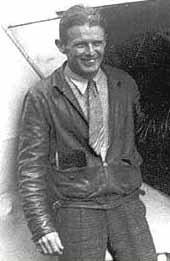
Douglas Corrigan as himself in the lead role.

In 1938, an unlikely event unfolds as pilot Douglas Corrigan returns to the United States after his transatlantic flight, made "the wrong way" across the Atlantic. The passion to fly was there from an early age as young Douglas faced some hardships as his parents separated, leaving his mother (Dorothy Peterson) to rear two sons and a daughter.

When his mother dies, Douglas becomes the family breadwinner, putting his brother Henry (Eddie Quillan) through college. With his own funds, he becomes partners with his friend Butch (Paul Kelly), an experienced pilot, in the purchase of an aircraft. Doug aspires to attain a pilot's job, but increasing regulation of commercial aviation keeps putting the job beyond his grasp: by the time he gains the experience required, the qualification standards have been increased again. After a series of setbacks, including losing his aircraft in a crash and seeing the qualification requirements include a college degree beyond his means, Doug begins to plan an audacious feat, flying across the Atlantic just like Charles Lindbergh (who also did not have a college education), to prove his exceptional ability. (Note: In one of his many jobs in aviation, Corrigan was a mechanic who helped assemble Lindbergh's Spirit of St. Louis at the Ryan plant in San Diego.)

After earning enough money as a welder to purchase and modify a second-hand aircraft, Doug goes into business with Henry as a barn-stormer to finance a transatlantic attempt, but Henry eventually tires of the drudgery of eking out a living day to day. Doug learns about a new commercial airline route to Ireland and decides to make a solo flight to prove his qualifications. In New York, after his plane is grounded by an inspector, Doug's brother arranges a return flight to San Diego, lifting the flight ban. Once in the air, Doug instead heads off to Ireland, and, 28 hours later, makes it successfully to Dublin. When Doug rejects an airline offer of a job as vice-president and chief pilot because he only wants to be a pilot, he is told that his goal is impossible, because passengers going "to Cheyenne" want to be confident of arriving at the correct destination!

== Cast ==
- Douglas Corrigan as himself
- Paul Kelly as Butch Brannan
- Robert Armstrong as Joe Alden, the flying instructor
- Gene Reynolds as Douglas Corrigan as a boy
- Donald MacBride as Roy Thompson
- Eddie Quillan as Henry Corrigan, Douglas' brother
- J. M. Kerrigan as Clyde Corrigan Sr., Douglas' father
- Dorothy Peterson as Mrs. Corrigan
- Olaf Hytten as Radio Operator (uncredited)
- Lloyd Ingraham as Doctor (uncredited)

== Production ==
The Flying Irishman was made quickly, with principal photography taking place from November 15 to December 1938 in Van Nuys and Culver City, California, to exploit the huge public interest in the adventure. Although the production attempted to provide an accurate account of his life story, with Corrigan as himself in the lead role, many of the other parts were played by established character actors, which undermined its attempt at realism.

== Reception ==
The Flying Irishman was a typical "B" film in terms of length and treatment as well as having an obviously uncomfortable individual featured in the lead role, yet the "fun" of the unlikely tale was conveyed. Frank Nugent of The New York Times charitably called it a "freak picture" that, nonetheless, was "... lively, unassuming, natural and thoroughly entertaining."
