= 1952 United States Senate election in California =

- November 4, 1952
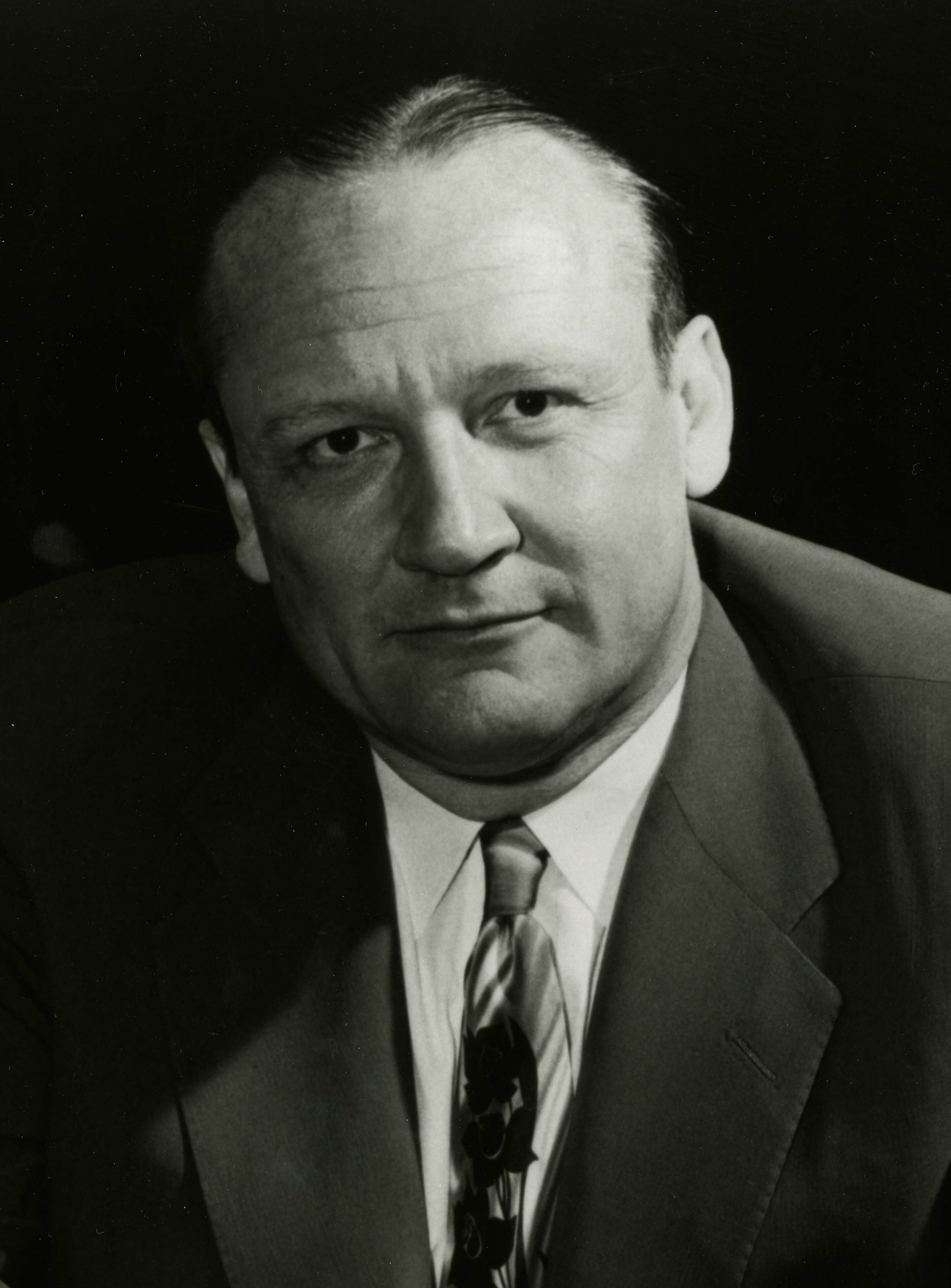

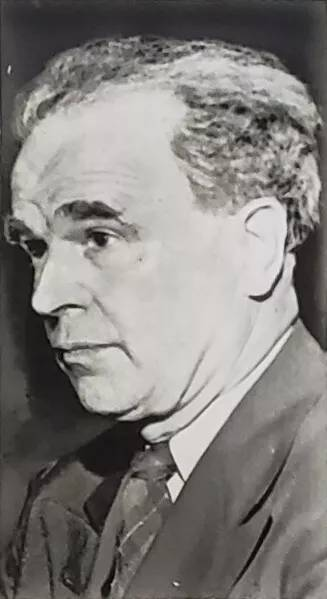
| Nominee | William Knowland | Reuben W. Borough |
| Party | Republican | Progressive |
| Alliance | Democratic |
| Popular vote | 3,982,448 | 542,270 |
| Percentage | 87.79% | 11.95% |
- County results Knowland: 80–90% 90–100%
U.S. senator before election
William F. Knowland
Republican
Elected U.S. Senator
William F. Knowland
Republican

The 1952 United States Senate election in California was held on November 4, 1952, concurrently with the 1952 U.S. presidential election, other elections to the United States Senate and House of Representatives, and various state and local elections.

By cross-filing and winning the Democratic nomination, incumbent Republican Senator William F. Knowland was able to cruise to a general election victory with only nominal opposition.

Until 1988, this was the last time a nominee from either party won re-election to this seat.

== Republican primary ==
=== Candidates ===
- Robert D. Adams
- William F. Knowland, incumbent senator since 1945

=== Results ===
1952 Republican U.S. Senate primary
| Party | Candidate | Votes | % |
|---|---|---|---|
| Republican | William F. Knowland (inc.) | 1,341,170 | 87.68% |
| Democratic | Clinton D. McKinnon (cross-filing) | 140,571 | 9.19% |
| Republican | Robert D. Adams | 47,969 | 3.14% |
| Total votes | | 1,529,710 | 100.00 |

== Democratic primary ==
=== Candidates ===
- Clinton D. McKinnon, U.S. representative from San Diego
- Arthur W. Watwood

=== Results ===
Primary result Knowland: 40–50% 50–60% 60–70% 70–80% McKinnon: 70–80%

1952 Democratic U.S. Senate primary
| Party | Candidate | Votes | % |
|---|---|---|---|
| Republican | William F. Knowland (inc.) (cross-filing) | 966,881 | 55.54% |
| Democratic | Clinton D. McKinnon | 633,556 | 36.39% |
| Democratic | Arthur W. Watwood | 140,406 | 8.07% |
| Total votes | | 1,740,843 | 100.00 |

== General election ==
=== Candidates ===
- Reuben W. Borough, former Los Angeles public works commissioner and editor of EPIC News (Progressive)
- William F. Knowland, incumbent senator since 1945 (Republican)

=== Results ===
General election results
| Party | Candidate | Votes | % | ±% |
|---|---|---|---|---|
| Republican | William Knowland (incumbent) | 3,982,448 | 87.79% | +33.69% |
| Progressive | Reuben W. Borough | 542,270 | 11.95% | N/A |
| Write-in | Helen Gahagan Douglas | 11,812 | 0.26% | N/A |
| Total votes | | 4,536,530 | 100.00% | |
| Republican hold | | Swing | | |

== See also ==
- 1952 United States Senate elections
