= Hymns of All Churches =

Americar radio musical series (1935–1947)

Hymns of All Churches is a quarter-hour American musical radio program that began in 1935 and ended in 1947. During that span it was broadcast on all of the four major networks of that era at one time or another. After being sustaining for the first year, it became the first commercially sponsored religious radio show.

== Overview ==
As the name implied, Hymns of All Churches featured hymns from churches of all denominations. Baritone Joe Emerson began the program. He was joined on the air by a choir and orchestra, with Eric Sagerquist directing them. Fred Jacky later directed those groups. William Sumner played the organ. Franklyn MacCormack, the host, provided "sensitive readings of familiar poetry and thought".

Emerson had a collection of approximately 500 hymn books for use in selecting the songs to be used on the air. He received thousands of requests for specific hymns, and he often introduced a hymn with an anecdote about how the composition was inspired. On any given program, a listener might have heard "a rousing old-time Methodist song of praise, ... a thousand-year-old Catholic chant, ... stately Hebrew phrases of an innocent Jewish hymn", or a Confucian hymn that was included in "a beautiful silk-covered volume with Chinese characters inside". Content of some episodes was tailored to fit specific events, such the September 17, 1936, broadcast, which (in observance of the Jewish New Year celebration) began with "Ovinu Malkenu", a traditional Hebrew hymn for God's protection and blessing in the new year. Episodes sometimes included talks by clergymen, including Preston Bradley.

== Production ==
Although the show began on WLW radio, as a network program, Hymns of All Churches originated from WBBM in Chicago. Emerson was the producer and arranger. The first 39 episodes were recorded at NBC's Recording Division. After that, recordings were made at World Broadcasting System's studios. General Mills products that were advertised on the program included Cheerios, Softasilk Cake Flour, and Gold Medal Kitchen-Tested Flour.

== Recordings ==
The program's choir recorded more than 400 favorite hymns for members of the United States armed services. Among those recordings were "the best-loved hymns of every creed and race", some from years past and others that were modern hymns at the time. Victor released a Christmas album recorded by the program's choir in 1946 and another album of the choir's music in 1949.

== Minister's opposition ==
On September 29, 1935, a minister in New York City criticized commercial sponsorship of religious radio programs in general and Hymns of All Churches in particular. The New York Times reported that Dr. Raymond L. Forman, in his sermon at St. Paul's Methodist Episcopal Church, called the program "a desecration of that which is sacred — a form of blasphemy" and encouraged both individual Christians and churches to protest it. That week was when Hymns of All Churches was scheduled to move to a national network. Forman said that he supported churches' sponsorship of religious programs, but "The worst form of exploitation of the religious life of people is perpetrated by commercial interests." He suggested that one result would be that when people sang hymns in church they would think about the sponsor.
