= Franklyn MacCormack =

American radio personality (1906–1971)

- Born: Franklin McCormick; March 8, 1906; Waterloo, Iowa, U.S.
- Died: June 12, 1971 (aged 65)
- Occupation: Radio personality
- Years active: 1930-1971
- Spouses: Vi Johnstone; Barbara Carlson

Franklyn MacCormack (March 8, 1906 – June 12, 1971) was an American radio personality in Chicago, Illinois, from the 1930s into the 1970s. After his death, Ward Quaal, the president of the last company for which MacCormack worked, described him as "a natural talent and one of the truly great performers of broadcasting's first 50 years."

== Early years ==
MacCormack was born Franklin H. McCormick on March 8, 1906, in Waterloo, Iowa, and had four siblings. He attended the University of Iowa.

== Radio ==
MacCormack began his radio career in South Bend, Indiana, and in 1930 had his first large-market job with WIL in St. Louis, Missouri. In 1933, he moved to WBBM in Chicago, Illinois, where he was "an actor, announcer and producer." His obituary in the Chicago Tribune said, "He developed his technique of lacing music with poetry while announcing in his native Waterloo, Ia."

MacCormack was the announcer of the long-running old-time radio serial Jack Armstrong, the All-American Boy. He was also the announcer for Easy Aces, Hymns of All Churches, Myrt and Marge, The Story of Joan and Kermit, The Wayne King Show, Woman in White, Bouquet for You, Caroline's Golden Store, The Curley Bradley Show and Dot and Will. Beginning November 9, 1936, MacCormack (poetry reader) and Jack Fulton (tenor) starred on Poetic Melodies. The program was carried on CBS.

On WCFL in Chicago, he was host of A Great Day for Music. For many, years he was the overnight broadcaster on two of Chicago's well-known clear-channel radio stations, first on WBBM and then on WGN.

In contrast to the primary sports-and-talk formats of WBBM and WGN, MacCormack read romantic and sentimental poetry and played classical, big band and Broadway music. One poem, "Why Do I Love You?" became his signature, the first line of which he would typically use to begin his program:

I love you not only for who you are, but for what I am when I am with you.

MacCormack's sotto voce style of reading these poems inspired the Bob and Ray character Charles the Poet, who can never get through one of his overly sentimental poems without breaking up into laughter.

In his final stint on radio, MacCormack hosted The All Night Showcase on WGN from 1959 until the day he died in 1971. The program was syndicated in addition to its broadcasts on WGN. The show originated at Uphoff's Rotunda Motel and Restaurant in Wisconsin Dells, Wisconsin for two weeks every summer, through the courtesy of local waterski show impresario Tommy Bartlett. An article in the June 27, 1965, issue of the Chicago Tribune reported, "These remote pickups ... are bigger nightly draws these summer nights than the city's biggest night clubs." Columnist Larry Wolters added, "People come from Madison, LaCrosse, Dubuque, Milwaukee, Chicago, and other places to watch Franklyn read his poetry, hear popular and familiar music, to hear him philosophize, and give out information on a variety of subjects."

== Books and recordings ==
MacCormack edited the 245-page Why I Love You and Other Poems from My Old Book of Memories (John C. Winston Company, 1948), and a paperback edition was published in 1963 by Chicago's Carl Mack Books.

In 1958, MacCormack recorded an album for Liberty Records. The album, The Torch Is Burning, consisted of spoken-word interpretations of classic big band era popular songs, backed by a string orchestra arranged and conducted by Russ Garcia.

== Personal life ==
MacCormack was married earlier in his life to Vi Johnstone. In 1943, he and his wife were sued by Elenor Yorke, a poet living in Chicago, for copyright infringement. The suit was dismissed in February 1944 after the judge ruled Yorke was unable to prove her cause of action. In 1961 he married Barbara Carlson, his secretary.

== Public perception ==
MacCormack was sometimes described by some as an aloof, effete romantic. Alternatively he was considered to be an ordinary beer-drinking man, blending in as a blue collar resident of Chicago. He owned a black Cadillac, described as the shiniest in town. His all night broadcasts on clear channel radio station WGN, sponsored by the Meister Brau beer, was popular with many long haul truckers, who tuned in his show because they could cross several state lines without having to change stations.

MacCormack often interspersed romantic on-air poetry readings with talk of running down to the corner to buy the early edition of the morning paper which he would read while eating a corned beef sandwich.

Later in his career MacCormack teamed up with recently widowed Nelson Eddy for a live concert in Chicago. MacCormack did not wear his toupee, letting his fans see the radio announcer "behind the curtain".

His long-time engineer, who was with him the night he died, commented on-air that MacCormack died after choking on a corned beef sandwich.

== Death ==
MacCormack became ill during the broadcast of June 12, 1971, and was quickly taken to a hospital. He had, in fact, suffered his second heart attack in a nine-month period, this time fatally, as he died Saturday afternoon. His time slot was initially filled by occasional guest host and staff newscaster Clif Mercer. 2,500 people gathered two days later to honor his passing.

MacCormack is cited as a member of the eclectic (and fictional) "orchestra" in The Bonzo Dog Doo-Dah Band's recording, The Intro and the Outro, where he is credited with playing the harmonica.

== Legacy ==
In 1971, the Franklyn MacCormack Music Library was established at the Dixon State School in Dixon, Illinois.

== See also ==
- Nick Kenny

== Listen to ==
- Franklyn MacCormack readings
