= Elenor Yorke =

American author

- Born: Elenor Ostermeier; 1919 Chicago
- Died: 1969 (aged 49–50)
- Genres: Non-fiction; Poetry
- Spouse: George McLain, 1962-1965
- Children: none

Elenor Yorke (1919–1969) was an American writer and poet, best known for her work My Weapon is Love, an autobiography first published in 1945 and reprinted since that time by other publishers.

== Personal ==
Yorke was born and raised in Chicago, one of two children of Martin and Theresa Ostermeier. Her writing style was noted for its upbeat tone, even as America faced challenges from World War II. In January 1944, she lost a copyright lawsuit against Franklyn MacCormack, a well known radio personality, and his wife Vi Johnstone. The following year, in her book My Weapon is Love, Yorke recounted her side of the dispute. She moved to California, and in 1954 she became president of the Hollywood chapter of the National League of American Pen Women. Circa 1962, she married George McLain, a prominent political figure. In 1963, she was nominated to be poet laureate of California.

== Selected works ==
- Anthills of Joy (1941) published by Lew Lauria, Hollywood, CA
- My Weapon is Love: An Autobiography (1945) published by Oceanic Publishing Company, Chicago, IL
- Direct Current (1953) published by Oceanic Publishing Company, Chicago, IL
