= Joe Knowland =

American actor (1930–2019)

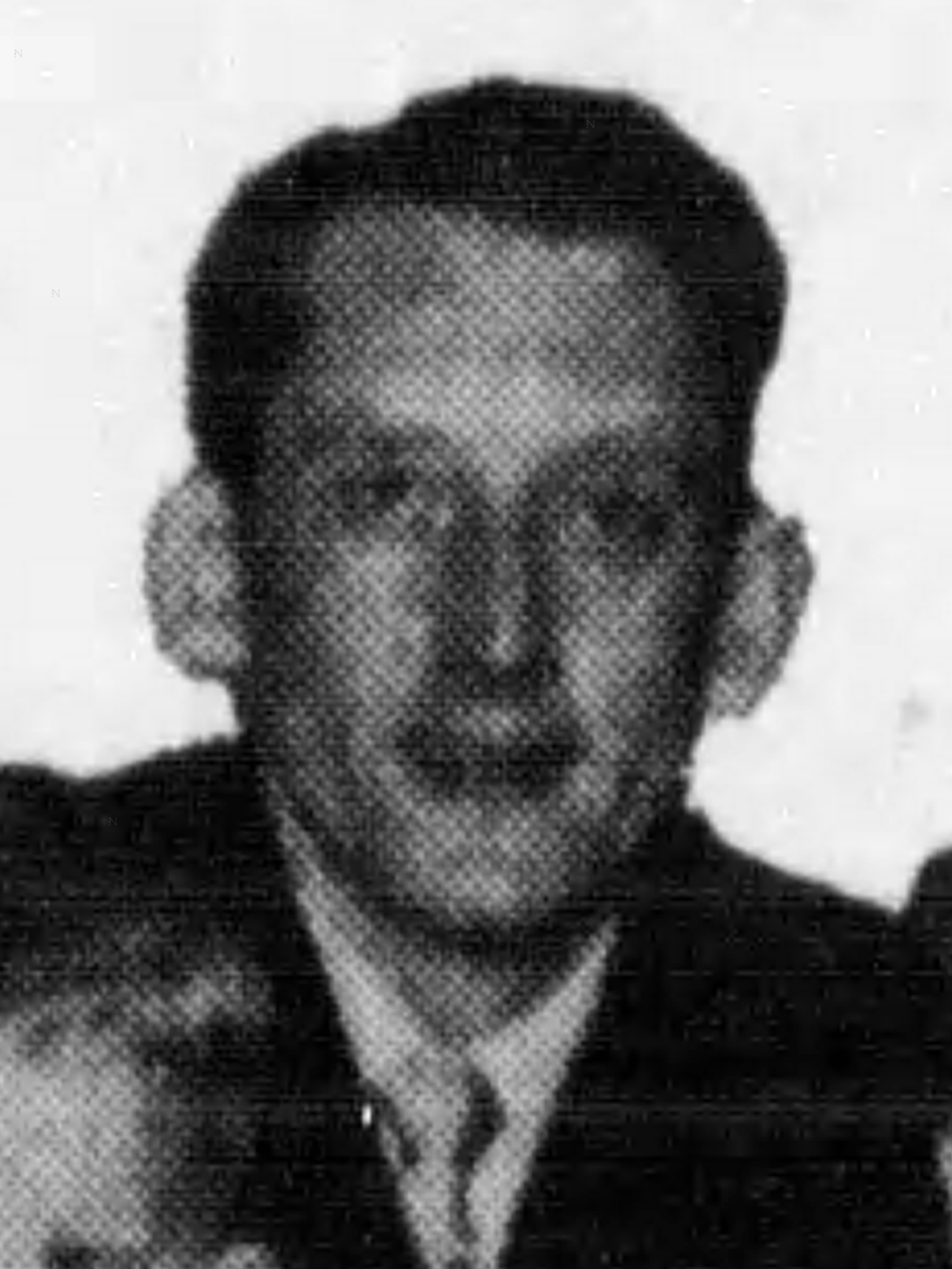
- Knowland in 1958
- Born: Joseph William Knowland; July 26, 1930; Oakland, California, U.S.
- Died: March 14, 2019 (aged 88); San Francisco, California, U.S.
- Education: University of California, Berkeley
- Spouse: Dee Knowland

Joseph William Knowland (July 26, 1930 – March 14, 2019) was a newspaper publisher and actor from Oakland, California. Knowland served as the editor and publisher of The Oakland Tribune newspaper, as did his father William F. Knowland and his grandfather Joseph R. Knowland before him. Knowland has acted in four feature films, a short film, three made-for-TV movies and two television episodes. In his acting career, Knowland billed himself as "Joe Knowland" starting in 1983. 'Joe' is the nickname formerly used by his grandfather.

== Early life ==
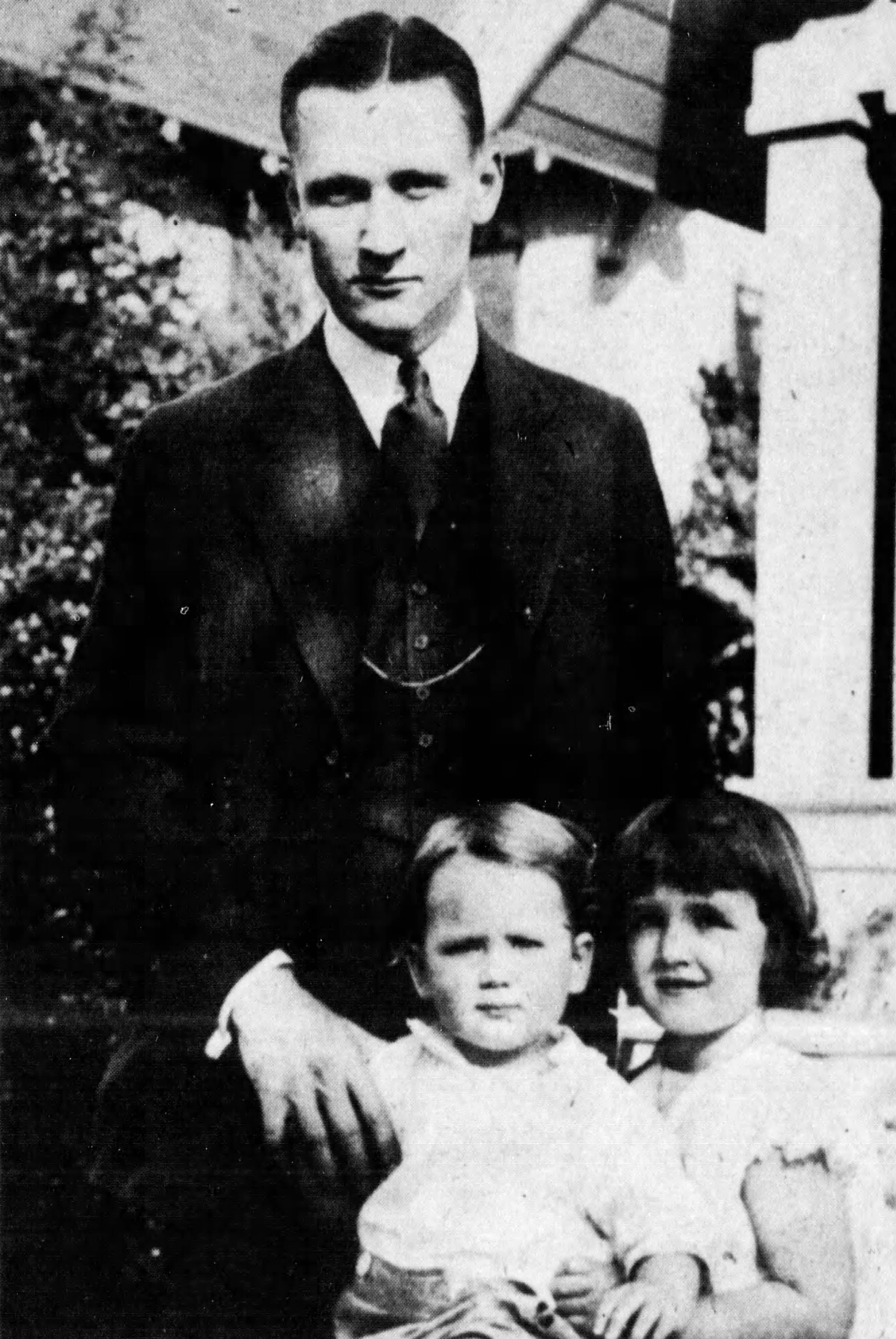
Knowland with his father William and sister Emelyn, 1932

Knowland was born in Oakland, California, on July 26, 1930, the second of three children born to William F. Knowland and Helen (née Herrick) Knowland, and the only son. Knowland was raised in Piedmont, a prosperous city surrounded by Oakland. In 1953, Knowland graduated from the University of California, Berkeley. His two Bachelor of Arts degrees covered the subjects of 'Speech' as well as 'Communications and Public Policy', a political science major.

== The Oakland Tribune ==
Knowland joined The Oakland Tribune in 1954 as a cub reporter, and trained in all aspects of running the enterprise. A magazine article in Time reported in 1963 that a "jet-setty Joseph W. Knowland" had set himself up in a luxurious office with a bar, refrigerator and television, and an expensive walnut desk grander than the dingy ones used by other Tribune staffers. One employee was reported as complaining, "It's like something out of Playboy." An industry veteran would later describe Knowland-the-publisher as "charming but ineffectual." In 1966, Knowland's grandfather died, leaving The Oakland Tribune newspaper to Knowland's father, the former United States Senator. Knowland was named the vice president and general manager of the paper. In 1974, a hundred years after the founding of the newspaper, and following the suicide of his father, Knowland became editor and publisher. He earned the "Publisher of the Year" award from the California Press Association just one year later.

== Acting ==
In 1977, Knowland's relatives sold the newspaper in a "bitter family squabble" to Combined Communications Corporation, owned by Arizona-based outdoor sign mogul Karl Eller. At the age of 47, Knowland left the firm to embark on an acting and modeling career. Knowland modeled for print advertisements and appeared in television commercials. Knowland's first feature film role was as a prison guard in Escape from Alcatraz, released in 1979.Knowland changed from billing himself as "Joseph Knowland" to "Joe Knowland" in 1983, with one television episode in 1986 reverting to using the name "Joseph Knowland" in the credits. He also appeared as the antique store clerk in Star Trek IV: The Voyage Home who bought the broken eye glasses Dr. McCoy gave Admiral Kirk in Star Trek II: The Wrath of Khan for one hundred dollars. for Knowland's most recent film was the half-hour short subject San Francisco: The Movie, in which Knowland was featured in the only credited role, the Old Sea Captain.

== Politics ==
The family business of Knowland's great-grandfather Joseph Knowland was lumber and shipping; he gained political power from the amassing of wealth. His grandfather Joseph Russell "J.R." Knowland served in the California State Legislature from 1899 to 1904 and the United States House of Representatives from 1904 to 1915. Upon leaving elected office, the elder Knowland acquired The Oakland Tribune, then the third-ranking newspaper in the San Francisco Bay Area, and used it to shape regional political opinion. Knowland's father, William F. Knowland, served in the California State Legislature and was appointed to the United States Senate in 1945, and re-elected twice, serving first as Senate Majority Leader, then as Senate Minority Leader. The Knowland family built far-reaching political ties.

Steeped in the powerful and politically conservative tradition of his forefathers, Knowland ran for US Senator in 1986, but in the primary election, he received only 1.81% of the vote against a large field of 12 other Republican candidates dominated by Bruce Herschensohn and the eventual winner, Ed Zschau. In the subsequent general election, Zschau lost to incumbent Alan Cranston in a narrow race. After that experience, Knowland never again ran for elected office.

== Clubs ==
Knowland was a member of several private clubs. In 1975, he served on the Public Relations committee of the Commonwealth Club of California. In 2006, veteran columnist Gerald Nachman observed that, in the 1970s, Knowland's heart was in performing onstage at the Bohemian Club, not in publishing a newspaper. In October 1982, Knowland played two characters, archenemy supervillain Professor Moriarty and elder brother Mycroft Holmes, in a Bohemian Club production entitled An Appointment with Sherlock Holmes.

== Personal life ==
Knowland and his realtor wife, Dee Knowland, were active in Oakland; both led the push in 1972–1973 to gain funding for the restoration of the city's Art Deco masterpiece, the Paramount Theatre, an effort that resulted in the building being designated a National Historic Landmark. The couple lived in Piedmont for 25 years, then in 1988 moved to the Upper Rockridge neighborhood of the so-called Oakland Hills. He died on March 14, 2019, at the age of 88.

== Filmography ==
Year	Title	Role	Notes
1979	Escape from Alcatraz	Guard #11	
1980	Little Miss Marker	Paddock Judge	
1986	Star Trek IV: The Voyage Home	Antique Store Owner	(Old San Francisco)
1987	Delta Fever	Earl	

== Television ==
Year	Title	Role	Notes
1989	Midnight Caller	Anton Crukshank (as Joseph Knowland)	Episode: "Wait Until Midnight"
