= Joseph Knowland =

American businessman

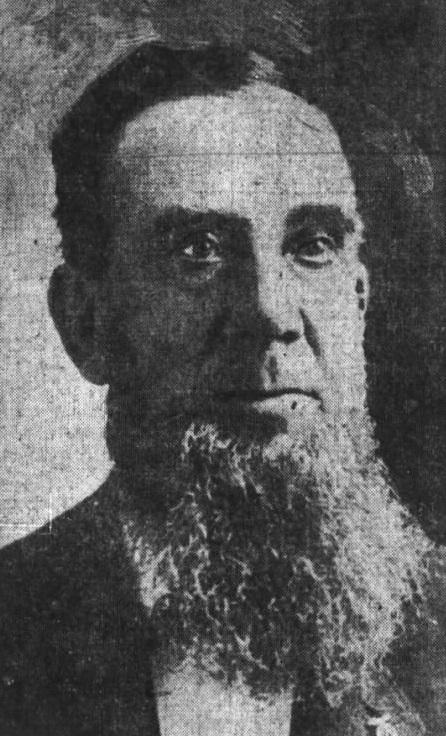
- Oakland Tribune (Oakland, CA), November 13, 1912
- Born: October 8, 1833; New York City, New York
- Died: November 13, 1912 (aged 79); Alameda, California

Joseph Knowland (October 8, 1833 – November 13, 1912) was an American businessman active in the San Francisco Bay Area. He was the father of United States Representative Joseph Russell Knowland, grandfather of United States Senator William Fife Knowland, and great-grandfather of publisher and actor Joseph William "Joe" Knowland.

== New York ==
Joseph Knowland was born in New York City, October 8, 1833.

He was orphaned as a youth. Little is known of his early life. His son, Joseph Russell Knowland, wrote: "his father's parents died when he was a small boy and [he] recalled little or nothing of them".

== Argonaut ==
As a young man, Joseph Knowland traveled west to seek his fortune in the California gold fields. He left Southampton, Long Island, New York, on the S.S. George Law to Aspinwall, the Port of the Isthmus of Panama, on the Atlantic side. He crossed the Isthmus by the 49-mile railway, seeing the tropical trees and jungle. He departed Panama on the Pacific side aboard the S.S. John L. Stephens. Joseph Knowland arrived in San Francisco on February 14, 1857. He traveled to Yankee Jim's in Placer County, the argonauts' gateway to the gold fields. However, chronic illness and lack of success made Knowland return to San Francisco.

== San Francisco ==
Joseph Knowland worked as a laborer, with the firm of George H. Moore and Francis B. Folger, which handled clipper ship service between New York and San Francisco. He left Moore and Folger in 1862, to clerk for Charles Hare's Anchors and Ship Chandler Company. However, a position with Benjamin Dore's Lumber Company soon proved more lucrative.

Having a secure job, May 13, 1863, Joseph Knowland married in San Francisco, Hannah Bailey Russell, (1832–1921) born in Moscow, Maine, and raised in Bingham, Maine. The daughter of Francis Russell and Rhoda Bailey Russell. Her ancestors, Joseph Russell and Calvin Russell, were veterans of the American Revolution.

Shortly after his marriage, Joseph Knowland was elevated to bookkeeper at Henry Blythe's Lumber Yard. Saving enough money to invest, in 1867, he formed a partnership with Jason Springer. Springer and Knowland Lumber Company was a profitable venture. Four years later Knowland and Charles Franklin Doe formed the Knowland and Doe Lumber Company. Charles Franklin Doe, the benefactor of the University of California, Berkeley, the main library bears his name.

The Knowland daughters were born during this period. Sadie E., (1864–1905), and Lucille, (1870–1926). A son, Hollis Russell Knowland, died as an infant.

Due to a recurrence of the illness of his mining days, in 1872, Joseph Knowland moved his family from San Francisco to the city of Alameda in Alameda County.

== Alameda ==
The new home at 2426 Lincoln Avenue was for a growing family. Joseph Russell Knowland, was born at home, August 5, 1873. The home was not a political one, yet the Northern ideals were instilled in the children. The children attended the public schools. Sadie and Lucy attended the private Snell Seminary School for Women and JR went to Hopkins Academy and University of the Pacific. Joseph R. Knowland wrote of his mother, "she was known as a warm, confident person who got things done, with a minimum of histrionics and a maximum of effectiveness.... having the rock-ribbed benevolence of a native of Maine".

== Business ==
Joseph Knowland had an instinct for business and a willingness to undertake new and exciting ventures. Diversified interests, related to the lumber business. He reorganized Gardiner Mill Company of Gardiner City, Oregon. A major interest-holder in the Kerchoff-Cuzner Mill in Los Angeles. Serving with the Hoopers and Talbots on the board of directors of the San Pedro Lumber Company. Joseph Knowland was chief advisor to the Southern Lumber Company of San Diego. Investing with Egbert Judson, former California governor, Frederick Low and other prominent men in mining interests in Tombstone, Arizona Territory. He served as vice-president of the Kennedy Mining and Milling Company in Jackson, Amador County. When whaling was very lucrative, Joseph Knowland, was the principal owner of the whaler Amethyst. U.S. Naval ships saved the crew; but, the Amethyst sank. Knowland, became a major stockholder in the Alameda Bank, and trustee of the Gas Consumers Association.

== Later life ==
A 33rd degree Mason, he served on the board of trustees of the Old People's Home. Joseph Knowland each Christmas would send coal and groceries to the most needy in the community and ask nothing for his charity.

His eldest daughter, Sadie E. Coe, wife of Professor George A. Coe of the Northwestern University at Evanston, Illinois. daughter, Lucille K. Hill and son, US Congressman Joseph Russell Knowland. His grandchildren, Elinor, Russ and Billy.

Sadie died August 23, 1905, and daughter-in-law, Ellie died July 20, 1908.

Knowland left a sick bed to vote for his son, November 5, 1912. The afternoon of November 13, 1912, Knowland died at his Alameda home, surrounded by his wife, son and daughter. The funeral was conducted as a joint Presbyterian and First Methodist service. Knowland was honored with full Masonic rites. Knowland was cremated. At Chapel of Memories in Oakland, California, his remains are in Verbena Section, Tier 2 Number 6 along with wife, Hannah and daughter, Lucille Knowland Hill.

== Fraternal organizations ==
Free and Accepted Mason, Knights Templar, Royal Arch Mason, Ancient Arabic Order of Nobles of the Mystic Shrine and Independent Order of Odd Fellows.
