= Douglas Corrigan =

American aviator (1907–1995)

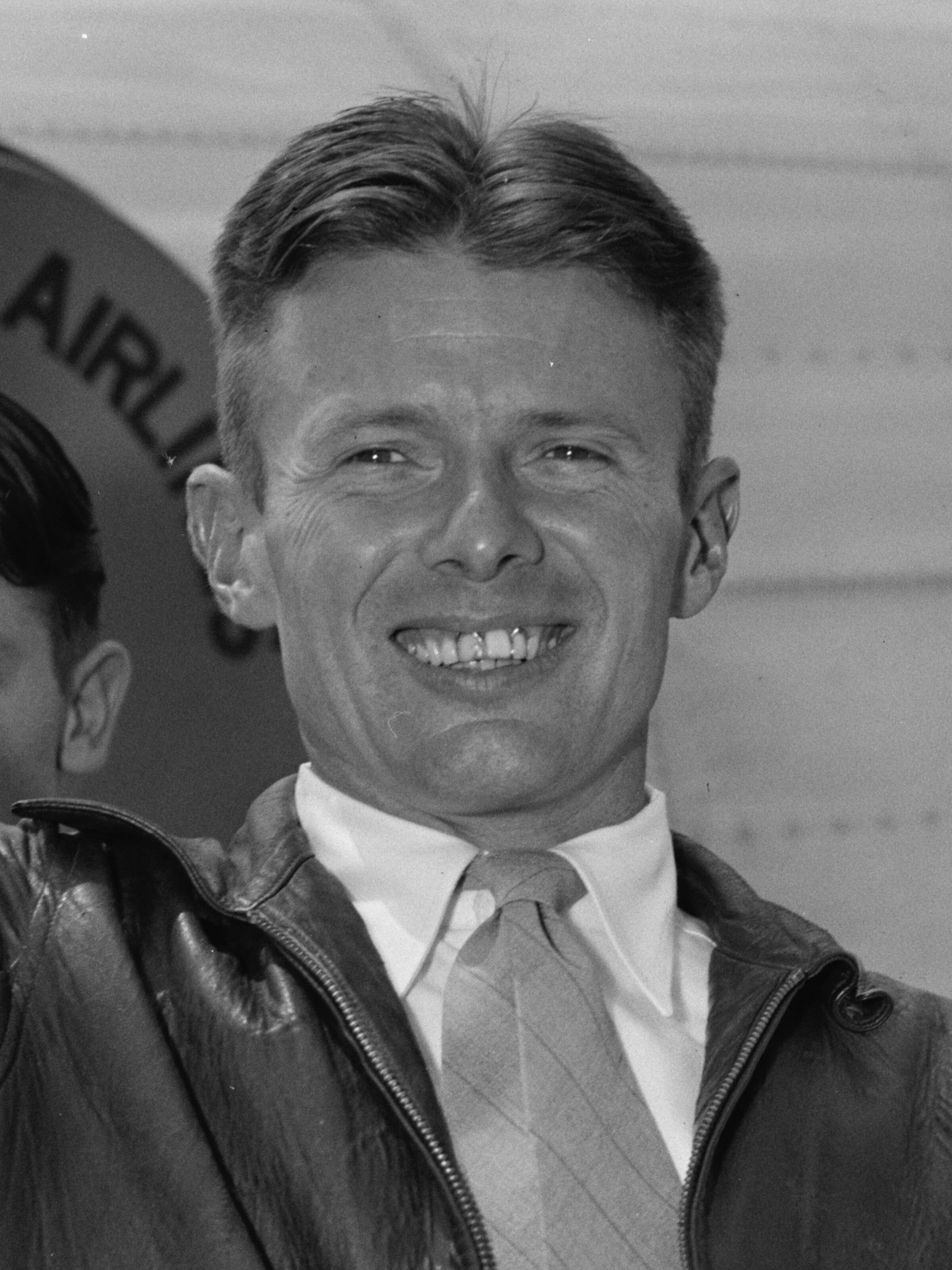
- Corrigan in 1938
- Born: Clyde Groce Corrigan; January 22, 1907; Galveston, Texas, U.S.
- Died: December 9, 1995 (aged 88); Santa Ana, California, U.S.
- Resting place: Fairhaven Memorial Park; Santa Ana, California
- Occupations: Aviator, mechanic, orange grower
- Spouse: Elizabeth Marvin Corrigan
- Children: 3 sons

Douglas Corrigan (born Clyde Groce Corrigan; January 22, 1907 – December 9, 1995) was an American aviator, nicknamed "Wrong Way" in 1938. After a transcontinental flight in July from Long Beach, California, to New York City, he then flew from Floyd Bennett Field in Brooklyn to Ireland, although his flight plan was filed to return to Long Beach.

Corrigan claimed his unauthorized transatlantic flight was due to a navigation error, caused by heavy cloud cover that obscured landmarks and by misreading his compass in low-light conditions. However, he was a skilled aircraft mechanic (he had helped construct Charles Lindbergh's Spirit of St. Louis) and had made several modifications to his own plane, preparing it for his transatlantic flight. He had been denied permission to make a nonstop flight from New York to Ireland, and his "navigational error" was seen as deliberate. Nevertheless, he never publicly admitted to having flown to Ireland intentionally.

== Early life ==
Clyde Groce Corrigan was named for his father, a construction engineer; his mother was a teacher. As an adult, he changed his name to Douglas. Born in Galveston, Texas, Corrigan was of Irish descent. The family moved often and his parents finally divorced, sharing custody of their children. Corrigan eventually settled with his mother, brother Harry, and sister Evelyn in Los Angeles. Quitting high school before graduation, he went to work in construction.

In October 1925, eighteen-year-old Corrigan saw people paying to be taken for short rides in a Curtiss JN-4 "Jenny" biplane near his home. He paid $2.50 (equivalent to $46 in 2025) for his own ride. A week later, he began flying lessons, spending non-flying time watching and learning from local aircraft mechanics. After twenty lessons, he made his first solo flight on March 25, 1926.

== Aircraft mechanic ==
Ryan Aeronautical Company operated from the airfield where Corrigan learned to fly, and hired him for their San Diego factory in 1926. Corrigan was responsible for assembling the wing and installing the fuel tanks and instrument panel of Charles Lindbergh's Spirit of St. Louis. Corrigan and his colleague Dan Burnett increased the lift of the aircraft by extending the wing 10 feet (3.0 m) longer than any previous Ryan design. Corrigan pulled the chocks from the Spirit of St Louis when Lindbergh took off from San Diego to New York to prepare for his historic flight.

After Lindbergh's success in May 1927, Corrigan decided to duplicate it and selected Ireland as his objective. He discussed the idea with friends and mentioned flying without permission. When Ryan Aeronautical moved to St. Louis in October 1928, Corrigan stayed in San Diego as a mechanic for the newly formed Airtech School. With more than fifty students flying each day, Corrigan could get flight time only during his lunch break.

During his short flights, Corrigan performed aerobatic stunts. His favorite maneuver was the chandelle, in strings of up to a dozen, spiralling from close to the ground. The company disapproved and prohibited him from performing stunts in the company aircraft. Corrigan simply flew to a field farther south where his stunts could not be seen by his employers.

Corrigan moved from job to job as an aircraft mechanic, using his employers' planes to develop his flying skills. He gained his transport pilot certificate in October 1929, and started a passenger service in 1930 with his friend Steve Reich, flying between small East Coast towns. The most lucrative part of the business turned out to be barnstorming displays promoting short recreational plane rides. Despite business success, Corrigan decided to return to California after a few years. In 1933, he spent $310 (equivalent to $7,700 in 2025) on a used 1929 Curtiss Robin OX-5 monoplane and flew it home, where he again worked as an aircraft mechanic, and began to modify the Robin for a transatlantic flight.

== Transatlantic flier ==
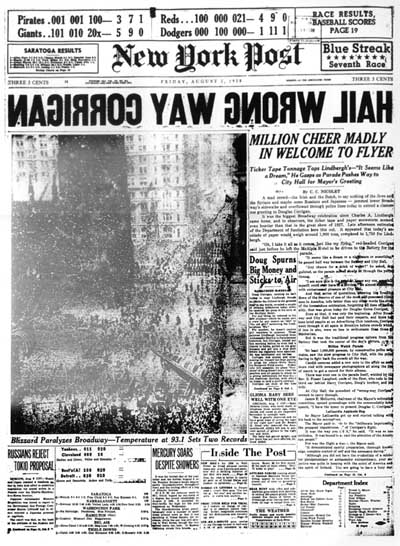
Friday, August 5, 1938 New York Post, mirrored banner headline

Having installed an engine built from two old Wright Whirlwind J6-5 engines (affording 165 hp (123 kW) instead of the 90 hp (67 kW) of the original) and extra fuel tanks, Corrigan applied to the Bureau of Air Commerce in 1935, seeking permission to make a nonstop flight from New York to Ireland. The application was rejected; his plane was deemed unsound for a nonstop transatlantic trip, although it was certified to the lower standard for cross-country journeys.

Over the next two years, Corrigan made repeated modifications and reapplications for full certification, but none succeeded. Indeed, by 1937, after extensive modifications in the face of increasing regulation, his aircraft was refused renewal of its license because it was deemed to be too unstable for safe flight. His autobiography expresses his exasperation with official resistance and he is widely thought to have responded by deciding that year to make an unofficial crossing.

Although he never admitted it, he apparently planned a late arrival at New York so that he could refill his tanks and leave for Ireland after airport officials had gone home from work. Mechanical problems extended his unapproved flight to nine days, which delayed him beyond the Atlantic "safe weather window", and he returned to California. As a result of this trip, he named his plane Sunshine. However, federal officials notified Californian airfield officials that Sunshine was not airworthy and it was grounded for six months.

On July 9, 1938, Corrigan again left California for Floyd Bennett Field in Brooklyn, New York. He had repaired the engine, taking his total spent on the aircraft to about $900 (equivalent to $20,600 in 2025), gained an experimental license, and obtained permission for a transcontinental flight with conditional consent for a return trip. With the Robin cruising at 85 miles per hour (137 km/h) for maximum fuel efficiency, the eastbound journey took him 27 hours. Fuel efficiency became critical toward the end of the flight, and a gasoline leak developed, filling the cockpit with fumes.

Upon his unannounced arrival at Floyd Bennett Field, in the midst of Howard Hughes' preparations for departure on a world tour, Corrigan decided repairing the leak would take too long if he was to meet his schedule. His logged flight plan had him returning to California on July 17. Before takeoff, Corrigan asked the manager of Floyd Bennett Field, Kenneth P. Behr, which runway to use, and Behr told him to use any runway as long as he didn't take off to the west, in the direction of the administration building where Behr had his office. As recorded in Corrigan's autobiography, Behr wished him "Bon Voyage" prior to takeoff, perhaps in a nod to Corrigan's intentions to fly the Atlantic. Upon takeoff at 0515 with 320 US gallons (1,200 L) of gasoline and 16 US gallons (61 L) of oil, Corrigan made a straight-out departure from the 4,200-foot (1,300 m) runway 06, and kept going east. (Behr later swore publicly he had no foreknowledge of Corrigan's intentions.)

Corrigan claimed to have noticed his "error" after flying for about 26 hours. This is not entirely consistent with his claim that after 10 hours, he felt his feet go cold; the cockpit floor was awash with gasoline leaking from the unrepaired tank. He used a screwdriver to punch a hole through the cockpit floor so that the fuel would drain away on the side opposite the hot exhaust pipe, reducing the risk of a midair explosion. Had he been truly unaware he was over ocean, it seems likely he would have descended at this point; instead, he claimed to have increased the engine speed by almost 20% in the hope of decreasing his flight time.

He landed at Baldonnel Aerodrome, County Dublin, on July 18, after flying 28:13 hrs. His provisions had been two chocolate bars, two boxes of fig bars, and a quart of water.

Corrigan's plane had fuel tanks mounted ahead of his position, allowing him to see only out of the sides. He had no radio and his compass was 20 years old. The journalist H. R. Knickerbocker, who met Corrigan in Ireland after his arrival, wrote in 1941:

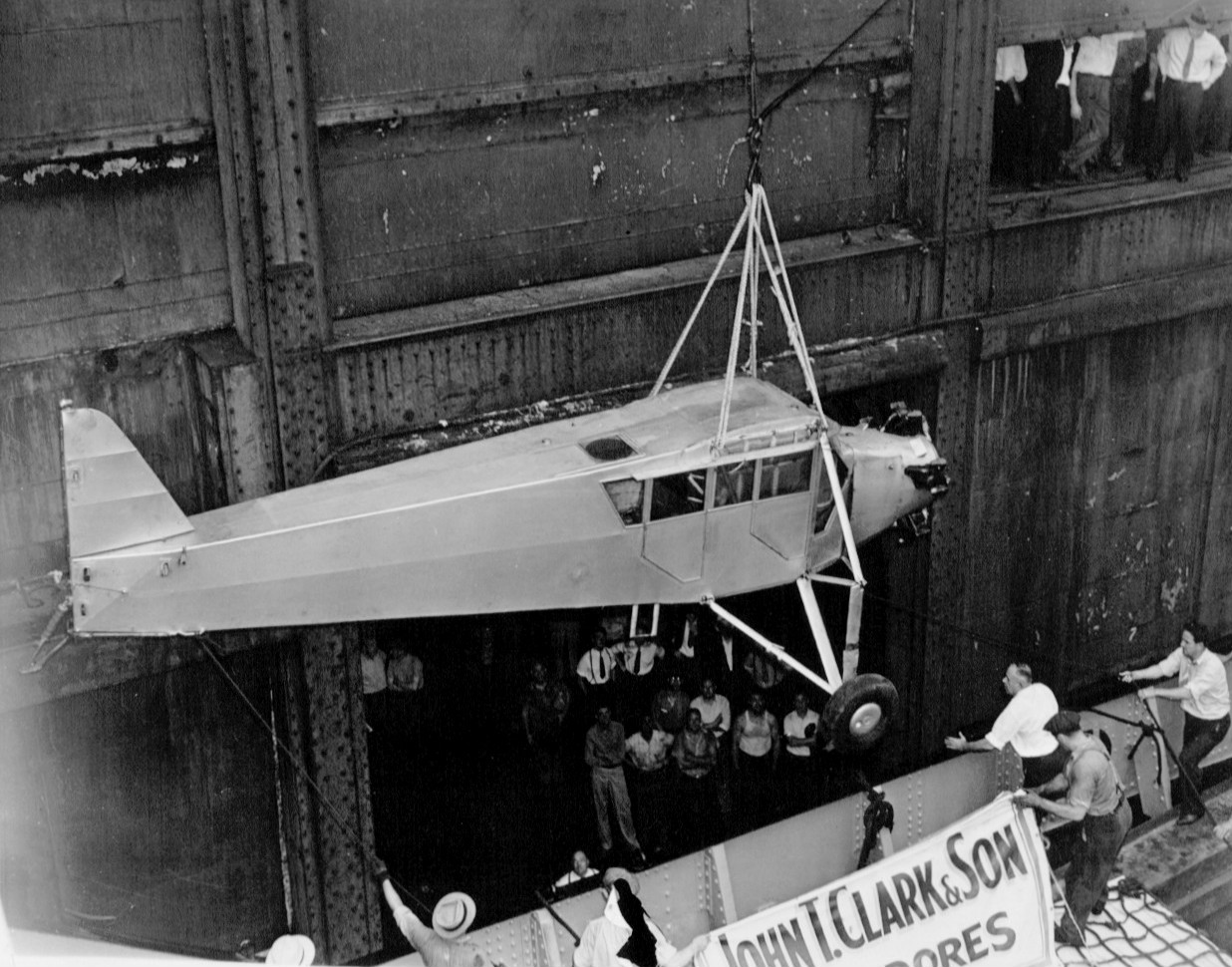
Corrigan's plane arriving in New York via ship

You may say that Corrigan's flight could not be compared to Lindbergh's in its sensational appeal as the first solo flight across the ocean. Yes, but in another way the obscure little Irishman's flight was the more audacious of the two. Lindbergh had a plane specially constructed, the finest money could buy. He had lavish financial backing, friends to help him at every turn. Corrigan had nothing but his own ambition, courage, and ability. His plane, a nine-year-old Curtiss Robin, was the most wretched-looking jalopy. As I looked over it at the Dublin airdrome I really marveled that anyone should have been rash enough even to go in the air with it, much less try to fly the Atlantic. He built it, or rebuilt it, practically as a boy would build a scooter out of a soapbox and a pair of old roller skates. It looked it. The nose of the engine hood was a mass of patches soldered by Corrigan himself into a crazy-quilt design. The door behind which Corrigan crouched for twenty-eight hours was fastened together with a piece of baling wire. The reserve gasoline tanks put together by Corrigan, left him so little room that he had to sit hunched forward with his knees cramped, and not enough window space to see the ground when landing.

Aviation officials sent a 600-word telegram to list the regulations broken by his flight (in a medium that encourages brevity by charging at a rate per word). Despite the extent of Corrigan's illegality, he received only a mild punishment; his pilot's certificate was suspended for 14 days. He and his plane returned to New York on the steamship Manhattan and arrived on August 4, the last day of his suspension. His return was marked with great celebration. More people attended his Broadway ticker-tape parade than had honored Lindbergh after his triumph. He was also given a ticker tape parade in Chicago. Later he met with United States President Franklin D. Roosevelt at the White House.

He appeared as a contestant on the July 16, 1957 episode of the United States television panel show To Tell the Truth.

== Later life ==
Retailer sample of Corrigan's autobiography That's My Story consisting of only the first chapter and all the illustrations followed by blank pages. The sales blurb pasted to the front cover explains it all.

Corrigan wrote his autobiography, That's My Story, within months of the flight; it was published for the Christmas market on 15 December 1938. He also endorsed 'wrong-way' products including a wristwatch that ran counter-clockwise. The following year (1939), he portrayed himself in RKO Radio Pictures' movie biography The Flying Irishman. The $75,000 (equal to $1,736,000 today) he earned from that movie role was the equivalent of 30 years' income at his airfield jobs. Although he did not immediately acknowledge the accomplishment, Charles Lindbergh wrote a friendly four-page handwritten letter to Corrigan in 1939 after Corrigan sent him a copy of the autobiography.

According to a letter written to a fan in 1940, Corrigan said he had "no hobbies except working on airplanes or machinery". When the United States entered World War II, he tested bombers and flew in the Ferry Command, a division of the Air Transport Command. In 1946, he gained less than 2% of the vote running for the U.S. Senate in California as a member of the Prohibition Party, running against Republican William F. Knowland. He then worked as a commercial pilot for a small California airline.

Corrigan retired from aviation in 1950 and bought an 18-acre (7.3 ha) orange grove in Santa Ana, California. He lived there with his wife and three sons for the remainder of his life. He knew nothing about raising oranges, and said he learned by copying his neighbors. His wife died in 1966, and Corrigan sold most of his grove for development, keeping only the ranch-style house. One of the streets in the 93-house estate is named after him. He became reclusive after one of his sons died in a private plane crash on Santa Catalina Island in 1972. In 1988, however, he joined in the golden anniversary celebration of his famous "wrong way" flight, allowing enthusiasts to retrieve the Robin from its hangar. The plane was reassembled and the engine was run successfully. Corrigan was so excited that the organizers placed guards at the plane's wings while he was at the show and considered tethering the tail to a police car to prevent him from taking off in it. Later, Corrigan became elusive about the plane's location. It was rumored he had dismantled and stored it in several locations to prevent its theft.

An anthology of aircraft-related mysteries published in 1995 claimed that Corrigan was elected an Honorary Member of the 'Liars Club of America' at the age of 84, and that the 'honor' (as with so many other suggestions over the years since his transatlantic flight) had been politely but firmly refused. Up to his death on December 9, 1995, Corrigan still maintained that he had made his transatlantic flight by accident.

In October 2019, Corrigan's Curtiss Robin was delivered to the Planes of Fame Air Museum in Chino, California, where it remains on display (although in a disassembled state).

== In popular culture ==
Corrigan's "error" caught the imagination of the depressed American public and inspired many jokes. The nickname "'Wrong Way' Corrigan" passed into common use (sometimes confused with the memory of 1929's "Wrong Way" Riegels football incident during the Rose Bowl) and was mentioned (or used as satire) when someone had the reputation for taking the wrong direction.

In the 1938 Three Stooges short “Flat Foot Stooges,” upon realizing they are heading in the wrong direction, firefighter Curly quips "Hey, we're doing the Corrigan!", a reference to aviator Douglas "Wrong Way" Corrigan.

== See also ==
- Amelia Earhart
- Charles Lindbergh
- Richard E. Byrd
- Jacqueline Cochran
- Jerrie Mock
- Roscoe Turner
