= 1986 United States Senate election in California =

- November 4, 1986
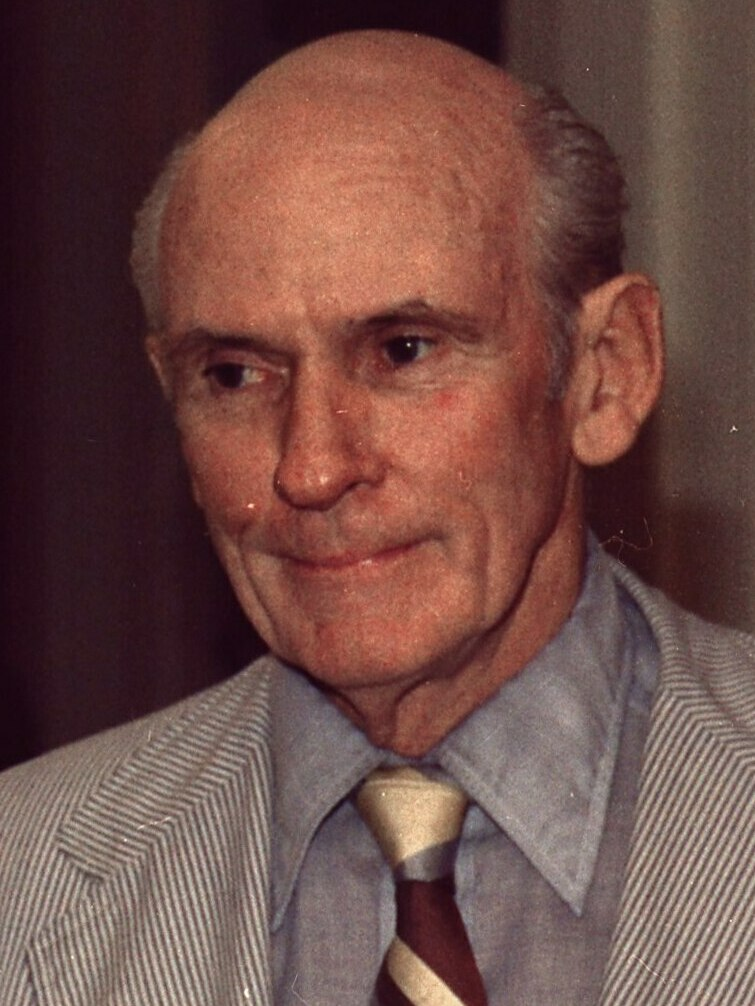

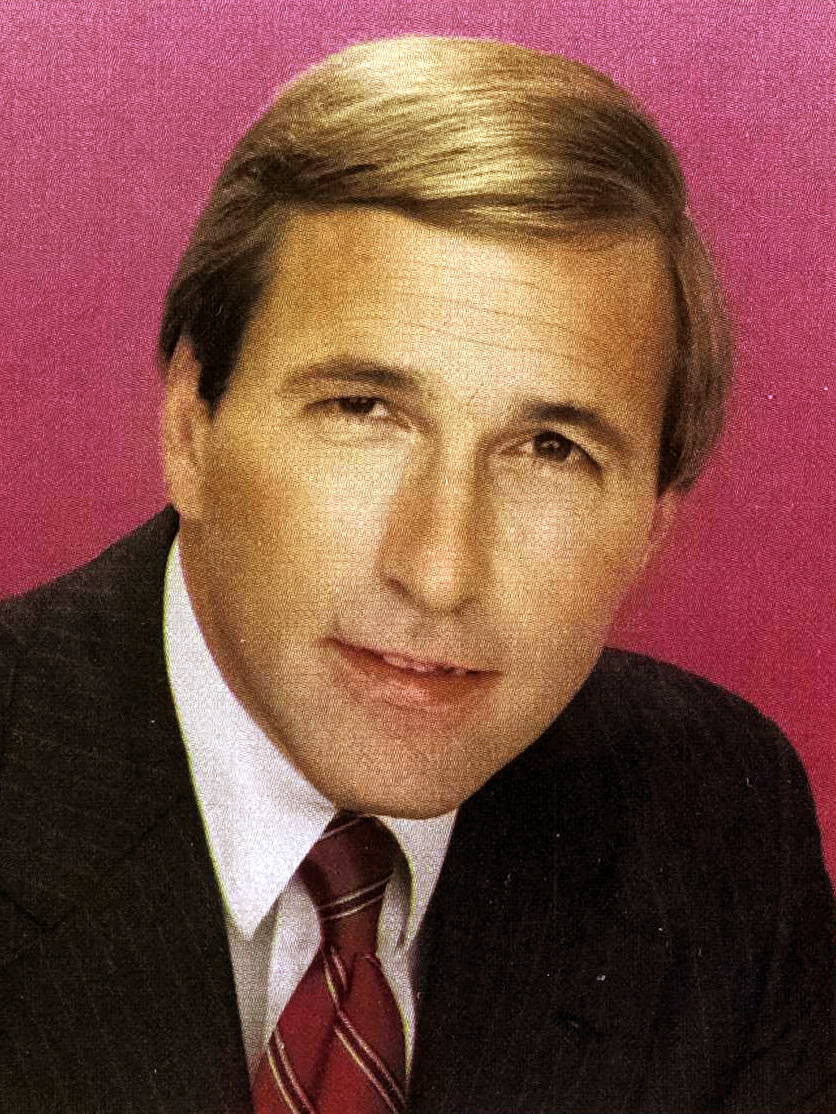
Nominee	Alan Cranston	Ed Zschau
Party	Democratic	Republican
Popular vote	3,646,672	3,541,804
Percentage	49.29%	47.87%
- County results Cranston: 40–50% 50–60% 60–70% 70–80% Zschau: 40–50% 50–60% 60–70%
U.S. senator before election
Alan Cranston
Democratic
Elected U.S. Senator
Alan Cranston
Democratic

The 1986 United States Senate election in California took place on November 4, 1986. Incumbent Democratic U.S. Senator Alan Cranston narrowly won re-election to a fourth and final term over Republican U.S. Congressman Ed Zschau. This was the last time where both major party nominees for the Class 3 Senate seat in California were men until 2022.

== Democratic primary ==
=== Candidates ===
- John Hancock Abbott, perennial candidate
- Robert John Banuelos, resident of Costa Mesa
- Alan Cranston, incumbent Senator
- Charles Greene
- Brian Lantz, candidate for Mayor of San Francisco in 1983

=== Results ===
1986 Democratic Senate primary
Party	Candidate	Votes	%
Democratic	Alan Cranston (incumbent)	1,807,244	80.71%
Democratic	Charles Greene	165,594	7.40%
Democratic	John Hancock Abbott	124,218	5.55%
Democratic	Robert John Banuelos	77,286	3.45%
Democratic	Brian Lantz	64,907	2.90%
Total votes		2,239,249	100.00%

== Republican primary ==
=== Candidates ===
- William B. Allen, professor at Harvey Mudd College and member of the National Council on the Humanities
- Michael D. Antonovich, Los Angeles County Supervisor and former State Assemblyman
- Eldridge Cleaver, author and former Black Panther
- Edward M. Davis, State Senator and former chief of the Los Angeles Police Department
- Bobbi Fiedler, U.S. Representative from Encino
- Bruce Herschensohn, political commentator for KABC-TV in Los Angeles
- Joe Knowland, actor, publisher of The Oakland Tribune and son of former Senator William Knowland
- Art Laffer, economic advisor to President Ronald Reagan
- George Montgomery
- Robert W. Naylor, State Assemblyman from Menlo Park
- William H. Pemberton, candidate for Senate in 1982
- John W. Spring
- Ed Zschau, U.S. Representative from Los Altos

=== Results ===
1986 Republican Senate primary
Party	Candidate	Votes	%
Republican	Ed Zschau	737,384	37.12%
Republican	Bruce Herschensohn	587,852	29.59%
Republican	Michael D. Antonovich	180,010	9.06%
Republican	Bobbi Fiedler	143,032	7.20%
Republican	Edward M. Davis	130,309	6.56%
Republican	Robert W. Naylor	60,820	3.06%
Republican	Art Laffer	47,288	2.38%
Republican	Joe Knowland	35,987	1.81%
Republican	Eldridge Cleaver	23,512	1.17%
Republican	George Montgomery	16,374	0.82%
Republican	William B. Allen	12,990	0.65%
Republican	William H. Pemberton	6,698	0.34%
Republican	John W. Spring	4,478	0.23%
Total votes		1,986,374	100.00%

== Peace and Freedom primary ==
=== Candidates ===
- Lenni Brenner, Trotskyist anti-war activist and writer
- Paul Kangas, private investigator and perennial candidate

=== Results ===
1986 Peace and Freedom Senate primary
Party	Candidate	Votes	%
Peace and Freedom	Paul Kangas	2,495	51.03%
Peace and Freedom	Lenni Brenner	2,394	48.97%
Total votes		4,889	100.00%

== General election ==
=== Results ===
1986 California U.S. Senate election
Party	Candidate	Votes	%
Democratic	Alan Cranston (incumbent)	3,646,672	49.29%
Republican	Ed Zschau	3,541,804	47.87%
American Independent	Edward B. Vallen	109,916	1.49%
Libertarian	Breck McKinley	66,261	0.90%
Peace and Freedom	Paul Kangas	33,869	0.46%
Independent	John W. Spring	12	0.00%
Independent	Sam Manuel	11	0.00%
Independent	John Hancock Abbott	4	0.00%
Total votes		7,398,549	100.00%
Democratic hold			

==== By county ====
County	Alan Cranston Democratic		Ed Zschau Republican		Various candidates Other parties		Margin		Total votes cast
County	#	%	#	%	#	%	#	%	Total votes cast
Alameda	235,338	64.6%	121,941	33.4%	7,273	2.0%	113,397	31.2%	364,552
Alpine	186	43.8%	214	50.4%	25	5.9%	-28	6.6%	425
Amador	4,131	42.0%	5,356	54.4%	350	3.5%	-1,225	-12.4%	9,837
Butte	22,864	40.1%	32,424	56.9%	1,684	3.0%	-9,560	-16.8%	56,972
Calaveras	4,375	40.0%	6,249	57.1%	313	2.8%	-1,874	-17.1%	10,937
Colusa	1,873	40.2%	2,691	57.8%	93	2.0%	-818	-17.6%	4,657
Contra Costa	126,673	50.5%	118,940	47.4%	5,075	2.0%	7,733	3.1%	250,688
Del Norte	2,858	45.0%	3,225	50.7%	272	4.3%	-367	-5.7%	6,355
El Dorado	13,983	39.6%	19,890	56.4%	1,413	3.9%	-5,907	-16.8%	35,286
Fresno	67,841	46.6%	72,420	49.8%	5,193	3.6%	-4,579	-3.2%	145,454
Glenn	2,375	33.4%	4,495	63.3%	231	3.3%	-2,120	-29.9%	7,101
Humboldt	22,741	55.5%	16,692	40.7%	1,564	3.8%	6,049	14.8%	40,997
Imperial	8,355	44.6%	9,630	51.4%	750	4.0%	-1,275	-6.8%	18,735
Inyo	2,169	32.1%	4,363	64.6%	218	3.3%	-2,194	-32.5%	6,750
Kern	48,108	38.2%	74,195	58.8%	3,791	3.0%	-26,087	-20.6%	126,094
Kings	7,786	44.1%	9,304	52.7%	573	3.3%	-1,518	-8.6%	17,663
Lake	7,755	47.9%	7,930	49.0%	493	3.1%	-175	-1.1%	16,178
Lassen	3,660	49.2%	3,414	45.9%	360	4.8%	246	3.3%	7,434
Los Angeles	1,110,614	54.5%	876,250	43.0%	52,368	2.6%	234,364	11.5%	2,039,232
Madera	6,895	39.5%	9,777	56.0%	777	4.4%	-2,882	-16.5%	17,449
Marin	52,906	57.8%	37,053	40.5%	1,577	1.7%	15,853	17.3%	91,536
Mariposa	2,292	42.1%	2,940	54.0%	216	3.9%	-648	-11.9%	5,448
Mendocino	12,830	52.5%	10,828	44.3%	790	3.2%	2,002	8.2%	24,448
Merced	12,873	43.3%	15,743	53.0%	1,104	3.7%	-2,870	-9.7%	29,720
Modoc	1,514	43.2%	1,827	52.2%	162	4.6%	-313	-9.0%	3,503
Mono	995	38.5%	1,521	58.9%	67	2.6%	-526	-20.4%	2,583
Monterey	35,861	49.2%	35,242	48.4%	1,715	2.3%	619	0.8%	72,818
Napa	18,417	47.6%	19,320	50.0%	932	2.4%	-903	-2.4%	38,669
Nevada	10,837	38.8%	16,084	57.6%	1,023	3.7%	-5,247	-18.8%	27,944
Orange	223,911	34.6%	399,963	61.9%	40,682	3.4%	-176,052	-27.3%	646,556
Placer	20,797	41.0%	27,991	55.2%	1,926	3.8%	-7,194	-14.2%	50,714
Plumas	3,084	45.2%	3,426	50.3%	307	4.5%	-342	-5.1%	6,817
Riverside	99,788	42.1%	129,312	54.6%	7,708	2.2%	-29,524	-12.5%	236,808
Sacramento	151,830	49.9%	143,286	47.1%	8,950	2.9%	8,544	2.8%	304,066
San Benito	3,184	42.2%	3,986	52.8%	374	4.9%	-802	-10.6%	7,544
San Bernardino	110,132	42.5%	138,786	53.5%	10,354	4.0%	-28,654	-11.0%	259,272
San Diego	245,282	42.1%	317,349	54.5%	19,502	3.3%	-72,067	-12.4%	582,133
San Francisco	168,327	74.2%	54,675	24.1%	3,708	1.7%	113,652	50.1%	226,710
San Joaquin	45,770	43.2%	57,572	54.3%	2,640	2.5%	-11,802	-11.1%	105,982
San Luis Obispo	24,755	40.0%	25,063	56.6%	2,097	3.4%	-10,308	-16.6%	61,915
San Mateo	104,485	53.7%	86,518	44.4%	3,715	1.9%	17,967	9.3%	194,718
Santa Barbara	48,989	45.7%	55,495	51.7%	2,778	2.6%	-6,506	-6.0%	107,262
Santa Clara	193,585	51.1%	174,960	46.2%	10,259	2.7%	18,625	4.9%	378,804
Santa Cruz	43,820	59.2%	28,349	38.3%	1,900	2.6%	15,471	20.9%	74,069
Shasta	18,604	45.2%	21,097	51.2%	1,487	3.6%	-2,493	-6.0%	41,188
Sierra	712	45.6%	788	50.5%	61	3.9%	-76	-4.9%	1,561
Siskiyou	7,328	47.8%	7,369	48.0%	649	4.2%	-41	-0.2%	15,346
Solano	38,356	51.6%	33,734	45.4%	2,227	3.0%	4,622	6.2%	74,317
Sonoma	67,721	54.0%	54,254	43.3%	3,393	3.6%	13,467	10.7%	125,368
Stanislaus	33,301	44.4%	39,696	52.9%	2,075	2.7%	-6,395	-8.5%	75,072
Sutter	5,099	33.2%	9,658	62.8%	615	4.0%	-4,559	-29.6%	15,372
Tehama	6,316	42.9%	7,857	53.4%	534	3.6%	-1,541	-10.5%	14,707
Trinity	2,591	46.7%	2,669	48.1%	287	5.2%	-78	-1.4%	5,547
Tulare	23,393	38.0%	36,230	58.8%	1,982	3.2%	-12,837	-20.8%	61,605
Tuolumne	6,701	43.4%	8,339	54.0%	395	2.5%	-1,638	-10.6%	15,435
Ventura	70,847	40.4%	99,223	56.5%	5,412	3.1%	-28,376	-16.1%	175,482
Yolo	23,995	55.9%	17,724	41.3%	1,175	2.8%	6,271	14.6%	42,894
Yuba	4,864	41.2%	6,477	54.9%	452	3.8%	-1,613	-13.7%	11,793
Total	3,646,672	49.3%	3,541,804	47.9%	210,073	2.8%	108,868	1.4%	7,398,549

Counties that flipped from Democratic to Republican

- Alpine
- Amador
- Butte
- Calaveras
- Colusa
- Del Norte
- Fresno
- Glenn
- Imperial
- Kings
- Kern
- Lake
- Madera
- Merced
- Mariposa
- Napa
- Placer
- Plumas
- Riverside
- San Benito
- San Bernardino
- San Diego
- San Joaquin
- San Luis Obispo
- Santa Barbara
- Shasta
- Sierra
- Siskiyou
- Stanislaus
- Trinity
- Tehama
- Tulare
- Tuolumne
- Ventura
- Yuba

== See also ==
- 1986 United States Senate elections
