= 1992 United States Senate election in California =

- November 3, 1992
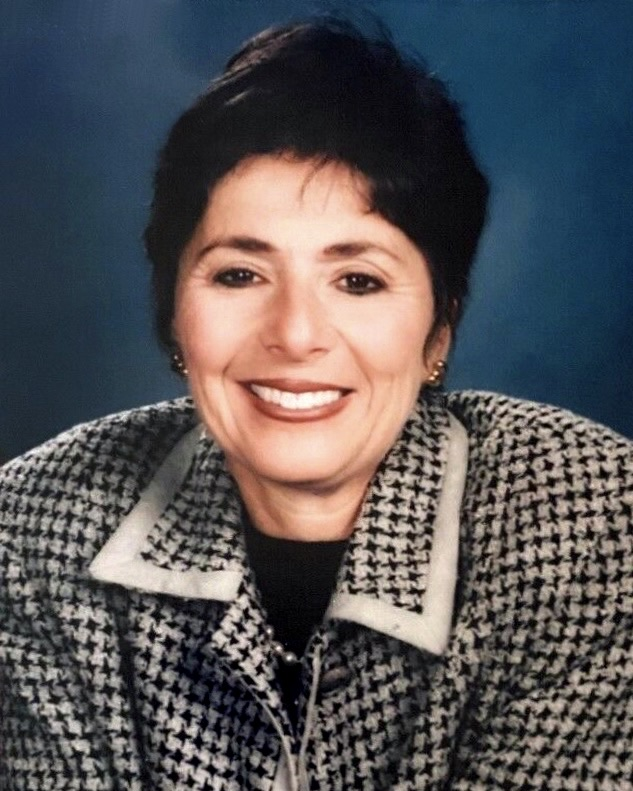

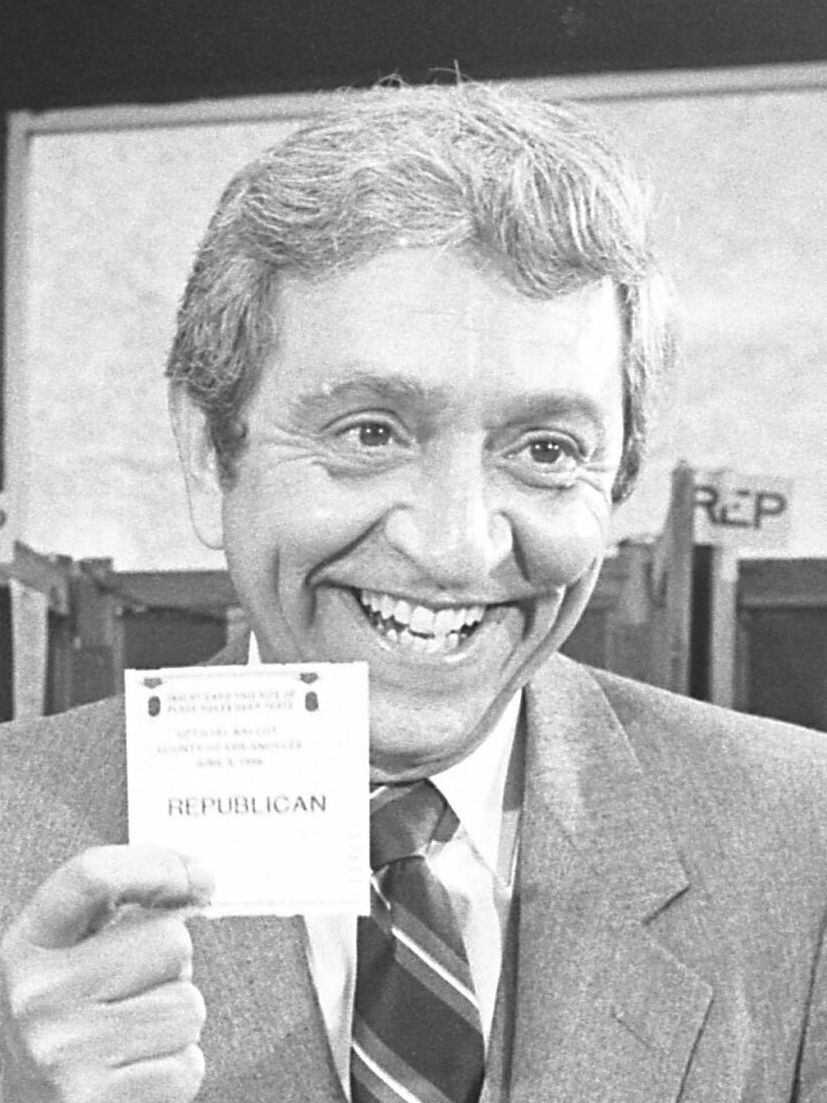
Nominee	Barbara Boxer	Bruce Herschensohn
Party	Democratic	Republican
Popular vote	5,173,467	4,644,182
Percentage	47.90%	43.00%
- Boxer: 40–50% 50–60% 60–70% 70–80% Herschensohn: 40–50% 50–60% 60–70%
U.S. senator before election
Alan Cranston
Democratic
Elected U.S. Senator
Barbara Boxer
Democratic

The 1992 United States Senate election in California took place on November 3, 1992, at the same time as the special election to the United States Senate in California. Incumbent Democrat Alan Cranston decided to retire. Democrat Barbara Boxer won the open seat. This election was noted as both of California's senators were elected for the first time. This is not a unique occurrence; it would happen again in Tennessee in 1994, Kansas in 1996, and Georgia in 2021. Fellow Democrat Dianne Feinstein, California's senior senator, won the special election and was inaugurated in November 1992.

== Democratic primary ==
=== Candidates ===
- Barbara Boxer, U.S. representative from Greenbrae
- Charles Greene, perennial candidate
- Mel Levine, U.S. representative from Santa Monica
- Leo T. McCarthy, lieutenant governor of California and nominee for Senate in 1988

=== Results ===
In the primary election in June, Boxer defeated McCarthy and Levine with 43.6% of the vote.

1992 Democratic Senate primary
Party	Candidate	Votes	%
Democratic	Barbara Boxer	1,339,126	43.58%
Democratic	Leo T. McCarthy	943,229	30.70%
Democratic	Mel Levine	667,359	21.72%
Democratic	Charles Greene	122,954	4.00%
Total votes		3,072,668	100.00%

== Republican primary ==
=== Candidates ===
- Sonny Bono, mayor of Palm Springs and retired entertainer, best known as a member of Sonny & Cher
- John M. Brown, resident of Stockton
- Tom Campbell, U.S. representative from Silicon Valley
- Bruce Herschensohn, political commentator for KABC-TV in Los Angeles and candidate for Senate in 1986
- Alexander Swift Justice, Pasadena gem cutter and candidate for U.S. representative in 1990
- John W. Spring, independent candidate for Senate in 1986
- Isaac Park Yonker, candidate for U.S. representative in 1990 from Mariposa

=== Results ===
1992 Republican Senate primary
Party	Candidate	Votes	%
Republican	Bruce Herschensohn	956,146	38.80%
Republican	Tom Campbell	859,970	34.90%
Republican	Sonny Bono	417,848	16.96%
Republican	Isaac Park Yonker	94,623	3.84%
Republican	Alexander Swift Justice	60,104	2.44%
Republican	John W. Spring	54,941	2.23%
Republican	John M. Brown	20,810	0.84%
Total votes		2,464,442	100.00%

== Peace and Freedom primary ==
=== Candidates ===
- Genevieve Torres
- Shirley Lee

=== Results ===
1992 Peace and Freedom Senate primary
Party	Candidate	Votes	%
Peace and Freedom	Genevieve Torres	5,492	60.34%
Peace and Freedom	Shirley Lee	3,610	39.66%
Total votes		9,102	100.00%

== General election ==
=== Candidates ===
- Barbara Boxer, U.S. representative from Greenbrae (Democratic)
- June R. Genis (Libertarian)
- Bruce Herschensohn, political commentator for KABC-TV in Los Angeles and candidate for Senate in 1986 (Republican)
- Jerome N. McCready (American Independent)
- Genevieve Torres (Peace and Freedom)

=== Campaign ===
Initially, Herschensohn was given little chance in the election because of his relatively conservative views, support from the religious right, and the large lead of Democratic nominee Bill Clinton in the presidential campaign in the state. Herschensohn proposed cutting funding for nearly every federal agency except the Department of Defense, repealing the Endangered Species Act, banning abortion with exceptions for rape, incest, and the life of the mothers, replacing the progressive income tax with a flat tax, and eliminating federal emergency relief aid for riots and most natural disasters (despite the Los Angeles riots which had occurred in the spring). Herschensohn also opposed restrictions on international trade and proposed a strong international military presence, citing his views as "constitutionalist." Despite these views, which were generally considered out-of-step with the California electorate, Herschensohn won support with a media-friendly approach, which observers and voters, including women, described as "down to earth" and contrasted with the "overly shrill" Boxer. His years of experience on Los Angeles television had also made him familiar to voters. He also criticized Boxer for her involvement in the House banking scandal, having overdrawn 143 checks on public funds during her time as U.S. representative.

In September, pollster Mervin Field gave Boxer a 22-point lead, but he found that her lead had halved to 11 points by October. No such narrowing was found in the presidential campaign nor the race for California's other Senate seat. Boxer attributed her campaign's issues to early, massive spending by the National Republican Senatorial Committee to criticize her record. By contrast, Boxer's advertisements avoided direct attacks on her opponent.

At the eleventh hour, controversy emerged that the Republican nominee attended a strip club. Four days before Election Day, polls showed Herschensohn had narrowed a double digit deficit, to come within by 3 percentage points. Political operative Bob Mulholland disrupted a Herschensohn campaign appearance with a large poster advertising a strip club shouting "Should the voters of California elect someone who frequently travels the strip joints of Hollywood?" Herschensohn admitted he had visited a strip club once, with his girlfriend and another couple. With press coverage of the story, Herschensohn spent the waning days of the campaign denying related allegations. Although some Republicans later blamed Herschensohn's defeat on Mulholland and accused the Boxer campaign of dirty tricks, evidence of the connection between Mulholland's outburst and the Boxer campaign never surfaced.

=== Results ===
The election was very close. Boxer was declared the winner by the Associated Press at 1:22 A.M. Pacific Coast Time.

1992 U.S. Senate election in California
Party	Candidate	Votes	%
Democratic	Barbara Boxer	5,173,467	47.90%
Republican	Bruce Herschensohn	4,644,182	43.00%
American Independent	Jerome N. McCready	373,051	3.45%
Peace and Freedom	Genevieve Torres	372,817	3.45%
Libertarian	June R. Genis	235,919	2.18%
Write-in	Joel Britton	110	0.00%
Write-in	John Cortese	101	0.00%
Write-in	Robert L. Bell	56	0.00%
Total votes		10,799,647	100.00
Democratic hold			

==== By county ====
Final results from the Secretary of State of California.

County	Boxer	Votes	Hersch.	Votes	McC.	Votes	Torres	Votes	Genis	Votes	W/I	V's
San Francisco	76.57%	233,068	18.72%	56,972	1.48%	4,503	1.84%	5,602	1.38%	4,214	0.00%	13
Alameda	66.94%	343,020	25.08%	128,489	3.08%	15,768	2.85%	14,610	2.04%	10,477	0.01%	29
Marin	63.47%	80,902	29.14%	37,150	2.59%	3,299	2.08%	2,656	2.72%	3,464	0.00%	1
Santa Cruz	61.21%	67,927	29.27%	32,482	2.98%	3,309	3.18%	3,525	3.36%	3,726	0.00%	2
San Mateo	59.39%	158,490	32.68%	87,209	2.49%	6,638	2.87%	7,669	2.58%	6,879	0.00%	0
Yolo	58.23%	35,006	33.10%	19,900	3.70%	2,222	2.85%	1,711	2.12%	1,274	0.00%	0
Sonoma	56.76%	108,991	32.65%	62,696	4.05%	7,772	3.69%	7,084	2.85%	5,476	0.00%	7
Mendocino	55.99%	19,818	33.10%	11,718	4.60%	1,627	3.28%	1,160	3.03%	1,074	0.00%	0
Contra Costa	55.17%	203,563	35.76%	131,923	3.65%	13,462	3.06%	11,290	2.36%	8,711	0.00%	3
Santa Clara	54.11%	314,884	35.55%	206,913	3.61%	21,001	3.59%	20,922	3.14%	18,261	0.00%	2
Los Angeles	52.55%	1,410,423	39.60%	1,062,974	2.56%	68,630	3.57%	95,779	1.72%	46,195	0.00%	65
Solano	51.87%	67,007	36.50%	47,148	5.12%	6,615	4.02%	5,188	2.49%	3,217	0.00%	0
Napa	49.63%	25,746	39.81%	20,655	4.32%	2,240	3.55%	1,841	2.69%	1,396	0.00%	0
Sacramento	49.09%	215,853	40.90%	179,844	3.96%	17,425	3.79%	16,684	2.25%	9,911	0.00%	0
Monterey	48.65%	54,400	41.05%	45,903	4.16%	4,648	3.63%	4,058	2.51%	2,801	0.00%	0
Humboldt	48.63%	27,916	43.13%	24,757	3.14%	1,802	3.38%	1,941	1.72%	986	0.00%	0
Lake	46.82%	10,805	40.54%	9,357	6.01%	1,388	3.51%	810	3.12%	720	0.00%	0
Alpine	45.18%	272	43.19%	260	5.81%	35	4.65%	28	1.16%	7	0.00%	0
Santa Barbara	45.11%	70,998	46.25%	72,793	3.49%	5,486	3.46%	5,444	1.70%	2,673	0.00%	0
Stanislaus	45.03%	55,688	45.18%	55,875	4.31%	5,332	3.64%	4,501	1.85%	2,285	0.00%	0
Imperial	44.66%	11,614	43.79%	11,389	3.15%	819	7.07%	1,839	1.33%	347	0.00%	0
San Benito	43.68%	5,415	44.59%	5,527	4.76%	590	4.34%	538	2.63%	326	0.00%	0
Tuolumne	42.81%	9,811	46.24%	10,596	4.86%	1,113	3.87%	886	2.21%	507	0.01%	2
Del Norte	42.36%	3,891	46.69%	4,289	6.00%	551	3.05%	280	1.91%	175	0.00%	0
Mono	42.23%	1,820	47.19%	2,034	4.01%	173	3.83%	165	2.74%	118	0.00%	0
San Diego	42.17%	399,087	47.35%	448,181	4.06%	38,434	3.53%	33,379	2.89%	27,336	0.00%	12
San Joaquin	42.15%	66,484	47.57%	75,032	4.41%	6,963	3.94%	6,213	1.92%	3,036	0.00%	0
S. L. Obispo	41.23%	41,824	49.24%	49,945	4.47%	4,530	2.89%	2,933	2.17%	2,205	0.00%	0
Siskiyou	40.60%	8,115	47.87%	9,568	6.33%	1,266	3.00%	599	2.21%	441	0.00%	0
Plumas	40.48%	4,032	47.47%	4,728	7.13%	710	2.78%	277	2.13%	212	0.01%	1
Amador	40.38%	6,082	48.91%	7,366	5.07%	764	3.23%	486	2.41%	363	0.00%	0
Ventura	39.62%	104,335	50.62%	133,274	3.89%	10,253	3.66%	9,629	2.20%	5,793	0.01%	25
Nevada	39.45%	17,091	49.87%	21,609	5.35%	2,317	2.74%	1,186	2.60%	1,125	0.00%	0
Placer	39.33%	34,905	50.50%	44,813	3.98%	3,532	3.72%	3,297	2.47%	2,193	0.00%	0
Merced	39.21%	17,848	49.12%	22,360	5.35%	2,434	3.47%	1,579	2.85%	1,298	0.00%	0
Sierra	38.69%	705	48.19%	878	7.14%	130	3.02%	55	2.96%	54	0.00%	0
El Dorado	38.66%	24,601	50.86%	32,368	4.68%	2,975	3.33%	2,116	2.48%	1,576	0.00%	0
Calaveras	38.35%	6,402	49.54%	8,269	5.80%	969	3.35%	559	2.96%	494	0.00%	0
Lassen	38.09%	3,761	48.85%	4,823	7.67%	757	3.33%	329	2.06%	203	0.00%	0
Riverside	38.05%	160,630	51.83%	218,778	4.39%	18,512	3.63%	15,323	2.11%	8,891	0.00%	0
Butte	37.41%	31,505	51.47%	43,338	5.11%	4,306	3.28%	2,762	2.73%	2,296	0.00%	0
Fresno	36.93%	78,321	55.59%	117,891	2.16%	4,587	3.78%	8,009	1.53%	3,248	0.00%	3
S. Bernardino	36.90%	164,620	51.81%	231,143	4.74%	21,138	4.38%	19,555	2.14%	9,558	0.02%	100
Mariposa	36.86%	2,989	51.92%	4,211	5.36%	435	3.86%	313	2.00%	162	0.00%	0
Trinity	35.16%	2,261	49.51%	3,184	7.79%	501	4.15%	267	3.39%	218	0.00%	0
Yuba	34.03%	5,638	52.67%	8,726	7.24%	1,199	3.30%	547	2.76%	458	0.00%	0
Colusa	33.57%	1,859	56.19%	3,112	5.00%	277	3.21%	178	2.02%	112	0.00%	0
Orange	33.41%	317,740	57.89%	550,502	3.20%	30,400	3.21%	30,550	2.29%	21,783	0.00%	2
Kings	33.09%	8,151	57.15%	14,079	3.63%	895	4.85%	1,196	1.28%	315	0.00%	0
Modoc	32.64%	1,429	54.07%	2,367	8.18%	358	3.22%	141	1.90%	83	0.00%	0
Madera	31.89%	9,401	59.74%	17,609	3.42%	1,009	3.82%	1,127	1.12%	329	0.00%	0
Inyo	30.98%	2,563	58.59%	4,847	4.96%	410	3.36%	278	2.12%	175	0.00%	0
Sutter	30.83%	7,719	59.04%	14,783	4.86%	1,216	3.23%	809	2.05%	513	0.00%	0
Tehama	30.71%	6,450	56.62%	11,893	6.47%	1,360	3.08%	647	3.12%	655	0.00%	0
Kern	30.30%	53,141	60.97%	106,916	3.58%	6,286	3.54%	6,200	1.61%	2,823	0.00%	0
Tulare	29.24%	25,311	62.21%	53,856	3.54%	3,066	3.78%	3,273	1.23%	1,067	0.00%	0
Shasta	28.39%	18,868	59.44%	39,507	6.15%	4,085	3.78%	2,515	2.24%	1,492	0.00%	0
Glenn	26.27%	2,271	62.16%	5,373	6.12%	529	3.23%	279	2.22%	192	0.00%	0

Counties that flipped from Republican to Democratic

- Imperial
- Alpine
- Lake
- Napa

Counties that flipped from Democratic to Republican

- Lassen

== See also ==
- 1992 United States Senate elections
