= Bob Mulholland =

American political operative (1946–2025)

Bob Mulholland (December 4, 1946 – October 19, 2025) was an American political operative in the California Democratic Party and a member of the Democratic National Committee for California.

== Early life ==
Son of a World War II veteran, Mulholland fought in the Vietnam War, where he served in the 101st Airborne division, 1967–68. He had supported the war at first, but changed his mind as the war dragged on.

== Political career ==
=== 1970s and 1980s: Tom Hayden ===
Mulholland started his political career by working with antiwar activist Tom Hayden. The two men had met in the summer of 1975. Mulholland worked with Hayden for 15 years, and ran his two first campaigns for the California State Assembly.

=== 1990s and 2000s: political consultant ===
In 1987, Mulholland became consultant for the California Democratic Party, and for the British Labour Party a few years later.

The November 1991 San Francisco Bay Guardian alleged Mulholland intercepted voter registration cards from Democratic Party voter registration tables of voters who had re-registered Green Party, sending the card back to the voter with a letter on state Democratic Party letterhead, reprinted by the Guardian, asking the voter to reconsider the change of party. After the Green party complained about this to the Secretary of State, Mulholland promised such things would not happen again. Withholding a voter registration card for more than three days is a misdemeanor in California.

During the 1990s, Mulholland acquired the hatred of Republicans, especially in his home state of California, due to a series of incidents, and statements he made. He was subsequently labelled "The US Democrats' leading dirty trickster" by The Guardian columnist Ed Harriman. Mulholland believed that, in politics, "people don't remember the good things about your guy. They remember the bad things about the other guy. That's what sticks. You gotta go negative to win." As such, Mulholland would search for dirt in his opponent's past (divorce, bankruptcy, child support problems), and throw it at them during the election campaign.

An example of this tactic can be seen during the 1992 United States Senate election in California, where Mulholland disrupted one of Bruce Herschensohn's campaign appearance with a large poster advertising a strip club shouting "Should the voters of California elect someone who frequently travels the strip joints of Hollywood?" Herschensohn admitted he had visited a strip club once, with his girlfriend and another couple. With press coverage of the story, Herschensohn spent the waning days of the campaign denying related allegations. Democratic candidate Barbara Boxer ended up winning the election by five points. Mrs. Boxer denounced Mulholland, and then party chairman Phil Angelides suspended him from his job as the party's political director. He was reinstated two weeks later.

During the 1996 United States presidential election, Mulholland suggested that democrats should follow Republican presidential candidate Bob Dole in walking cigarettes costume, and label him "Mr. Puff" to highlight his ties to the tobacco industry.

Mulholland's participation in the 2000 United States presidential election recount in Florida reportedly induced anxiety among Republicans, fearing he would not act in an impartial manner in this position.

Mulholland was very critical of then-California Governor Arnold Schwarzenegger. He claimed that "Arnold Schwarzenegger is a scoundrel, he's not a man who keeps his word. He'll look you in the face, make a pledge and then an hour later will say the opposite. His tenure has been all sizzle, no steak. He's acting as if he's still on stage. Truth or lies, it's of no concern: he's lied all his life to promote his career." On his height, Mulholland claimed Schwarzenegger was 5'10" (instead of his official height of 6'2") and that he wore "risers in his boots", a metaphor for his political ambitions.

He participated in killing a 2007 proposal that the party censure U.S. Senator Dianne Feinstein for her failure to oppose the confirmation of Judge Michael Mukasey as U.S. Attorney General. He is quoted as saying "It is going to be thrown out and rejected. Sometimes people can't anticipate or can't understand the big picture."

In the 2008 United States presidential election, he criticized John McCain for his age and for contemplating a campaign for California's electoral votes.

=== 2010s: Democratic National Committee proposals ===
Mulholland was a member of the Democratic National Committee from California, and a superdelegate at the Democratic National Convention. Mulholland supported Hillary Clinton in the 2016 Democratic Party presidential primaries.

In February 2017, Mulholland was a vocal opponent of a DNC resolution which would have banned donations from Corporate Political action committees to the DNC. This ban was first imposed by presidential nominee Barack Obama in 2008, but was removed by then-DNC chair Debbie Wasserman Schultz in 2016. Mulholland also opposed the nomination Keith Ellison as DNC chairman, calling him a "tax cheat", and thus unqualified for this position. Mulholland was referring to an unpaid traffic ticket which lead to Ellison's drivers licence being suspended in 2006.

In October 2017, Mulholland proposed a resolution at the DNC urging Independent Senators Bernie Sanders from Vermont and Angus King from Maine to join the Democratic Party, with which they are already caucusing. The resolution was denied a vote at the meeting.

During this DNC meeting in October 2017, Mulholland suggested that it is useless for the Democratic Party to do outreach for rural white voters. "The majority of white people in America have not voted for us since 1964," he said. "White people… are not interested in our program."

Mulholland was a vocal critic of the proposal to significantly decrease the influence of superdelegates in the democratic presidential candidate nomination process. Mulholland compared it to the violent suppression of the civil rights movement. In an email to Tom Perez and Keith Ellison, he accused them of "conspiring with Bernie Sanders to block Congress members John Lewis, Maxine Waters, Barbara Lee and the rest of the congressional delegation, Governors, State Party Chairs and the rest of us DNC Members from entering our Convention floor in 2020 as voters", with an attached picture of the police beating Lewis in 1965 during a civil rights protest. "I don’t know if you will have paid thugs at the doorways to beat up Congressman Lewis and the rest of us or not", he added. Mulholland also suggested that this proposal is part of a Russian plot. He bases this claim on the fact that an avowed Jill Stein voter from West Virginia has been attending multiple DNC's rule and bylaws committee national meetings to promote the proposal. Mulholland wrote that he then "concluded someone is picking up her expenses" and that "The Putin operation is still active." He admitted he processes no evidence for this claim.

Bob Mulholland had initially endorsed California Senator Kamala Harris in the 2020 Democratic Party presidential primaries. After she dropped out, he endorsed former Vice-President Joe Biden in December 2019. Ahead of the 2020 US Presidential election, he warned Democrats that defeating Donald Trump could be challenging because of the President's innate ability "to talk with the everyday voter".

== Personal life and death ==
Mulholland was married to Jane Dolan, who was defeated June 2010 in her reelection for Butte County Supervisor of the second district in California after over 30 years of service in this position. Mulholland died on October 19, 2025, at the age of 78.
