= Bobbi Fiedler =

American politician (1937–2019)

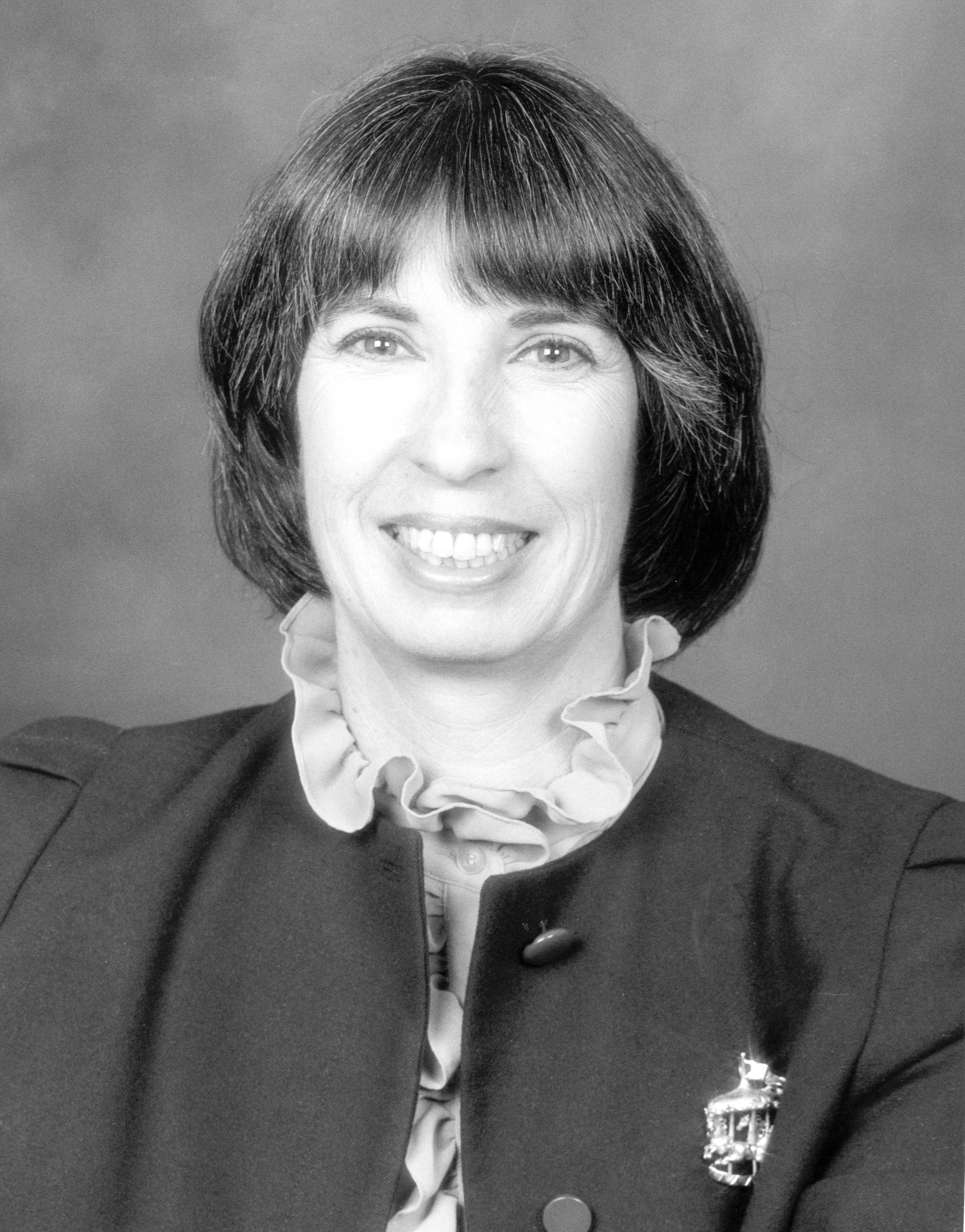

Member of the U.S. House of Representatives from California's 21st district
- In office January 3, 1981 – January 3, 1987
- Preceded by: James C. Corman
- Succeeded by: Elton Gallegly

Personal details
- Born: Roberta Frances Horowitz; April 22, 1937 Santa Monica, California, U.S.
- Died: March 3, 2019 (aged 81) Los Angeles, California, U.S.
- Party: Republican
- Education: Santa Monica City College

Roberta Frances "Bobbi" Fiedler (née Horowitz; April 22, 1937 – March 3, 2019) was an American politician who served three terms as a Republican U.S. Representative from California from 1981 to 1987.

== Early life and education ==
Born to Jack and Sylvia (Levin) Horowitz in Santa Monica, California on April 22, 1937, Fiedler grew up in a Jewish family, the second of two sisters, and attended area public schools. Her father was a former champion boxer and owner of a construction business. She continued her studies at Santa Monica Technical School (1955–1957) and Santa Monica City College (1955–1959).

== Career ==
Fiedler began her political career at Encino's Lanai Road Elementary School, where she mobilized other mothers to protest court-ordered desegregation busing. Fiedler formed an organization called Bustop in 1976, and the organization grew to 30,000 members in weeks. Fiedler was elected to the Los Angeles Board of Education in 1977 after defeating board president Robert Docter, who favored desegregation busing. While serving on the Los Angeles (City) Board of Education, Fiedler and fellow board member Roberta Weintraub were outspoken opponents of desegregation busing.

=== Congress ===
In 1980, Fiedler ran as a Republican for Congress against Democrat James C. Corman, who had served 20 years in Congress and was the chairman of the Democratic Congressional Campaign Committee. Fiedler was an underdog, running against Corman in a district that was 62% Democratic, and with the incumbent next in line to be chairman of the United States House Committee on Ways and Means. The National Republican Congressional Committee targeted Corman, hoping not to defeat him, but to embarrass him. Desegregation busing was the central issue in the election between Fiedler and Corman, with some children being forced to ride a bus up to 50 miles away from home. Time reported on the campaign as follows: "Again the issue is local: busing that was ordered by the Supreme Court of California in 1977 to desegregate public schools in Los Angeles County."

Corman's campaign manager, Clint Reilly, later recalled that his candidate's position on racial integration drew heavy fire from Fiedler, whom he described as "the leader of LA's anti-busing movement." Reilly noted that the Republican Party raised more than a million dollars for Fiedler, and "the campaign was waged in the racially charged atmosphere of the San Fernando Valley." During the campaign, anti-busing activists frequently picketed Corman. Polls showed the race nearly tied before the election, and Corman lost to Fiedler by 750 votes out of 200,000 cast (less than 0.4%). Jimmy Carter publicly conceded the election to Ronald Reagan while the polls were still open in California. There were anecdotal reports of disgruntled Democrats leaving election day lines and going home rather than voting, thus potentially costing Corman the election.

Fiedler was one of several Jewish women who have been elected to Congress from California; she was followed in 1982 by Barbara Boxer and in 1992 by Jane Harman. (The first woman elected from California was Mae Ella Nolan of San Francisco in 1923.) Fiedler considered herself an independent Republican, breaking with her party over her support for abortion rights and the Equal Rights Amendment.

After her narrow victory in 1980, Fiedler was drawn into the same congressional district as Barry Goldwater Jr. When Goldwater decided to run instead for the U.S. Senate, Fiedler had only token opposition in the GOP primary and won an easy re-election later that year in the heavily Republican district. She defeated Democrat George Henry Margolis 71.8% to 24.1%. She won in another landslide in 1984, defeating Charlie Davis 72.3% to 25.9%.

=== U.S. Senate campaign ===
In 1986, Fiedler did not run for re-election to the House of Representatives, opting instead to make what proved to be an unsuccessful bid for the Republican nomination to challenge three-term Democratic incumbent Alan Cranston for his United States Senate seat.

She was charged with political corruption in January 1986 after an undercover investigation allegedly showed that Fiedler offered $100,000 to a rival, State Senator Ed Davis (R), if he would withdraw from the Republican senatorial primary. The charges were dismissed by Judge Robert Altman before the matter went to trial. Despite the dismissal of the charges in February 1986, Fiedler garnered only 7.2% of the vote in the Republican primary.

=== Later career ===
After her congressional career, Fiedler contributed to the successful campaigns of George H. W. Bush and California governor Pete Wilson. She also advised Republican women running for local and state office. In 1993, Los Angeles mayor Richard Riordan appointed her to the Community Redevelopment Agency, and Governor Wilson named her to the California Lottery Commission. Fiedler completed one term on each body before stepping down, and she later supported the movement for San Fernando Valley secession.

== Personal life and death ==
Fiedler was married three times, and had two children. Her first husband was a pharmacist, who she divorced in 1977. Her second husband was Paul Clarke, her former chief of staff, whom she married in 1987. Clarke died in 1996, and in 1998 Fiedler married Harry Coleman, a Los Angeles-based political activist.

Fiedler died in Northridge, Los Angeles on March 3, 2019.

== Electoral results ==
1980 United States House of Representatives elections in California, 21st district
Party	Candidate	Votes	%
Republican	Bobbi Fiedler	74,674	48.7
Democratic	James C. Corman (Incumbent)	73,898	48.2
Libertarian	George J. Lehmann	2,790	1.8
Peace and Freedom	Jan B. Tucker	2,038	1.3
Total votes		153,400	100.0
Turnout			
Republican gain from Democratic			

1982 United States House of Representatives elections in California, 21st district
Party	Candidate	Votes	%
Republican	Bobbi Fiedler (Incumbent)	138,474	71.8
Democratic	George Henry Margolis	46,412	24.1
Libertarian	Daniel Wiener	7,881	4.1
Total votes		192,767	100.0
Turnout			
Republican hold			

1984 United States House of Representatives elections in California, 21st district
Party	Candidate	Votes	%
Republican	Bobbi Fiedler (Incumbent)	173,504	72.3
Democratic	Charles "Charlie" Davis	62,085	25.9
Libertarian	Robert Townsend Leet	4,379	1.8
Total votes		239,968	100.0
Turnout			
Republican hold			

1986 Republican Senate primary
Party	Candidate	Votes	%
Republican	Ed Zschau	737,384	37.12%
Republican	Bruce Herschensohn	587,852	29.59%
Republican	Michael D. Antonovich	180,010	9.06%
Republican	Bobbi Fiedler	143,032	7.20%
Republican	Edward M. Davis	130,309	6.56%
Republican	Robert W. Naylor	60,820	3.06%
Republican	Art Laffer	47,288	2.38%
Republican	Joe Knowland	35,987	1.81%
Republican	Eldridge Cleaver	23,512	1.17%
Republican	George Montgomery	16,374	0.82%
Republican	William B. Allen	12,990	0.65%
Republican	William H. Pemberton	6,698	0.34%
Republican	John W. Spring	4,478	0.23%
Total votes		1,986,374	100.00%

== See also ==
- List of Jewish members of the United States Congress
- Women in the United States House of Representatives

U.S. House of Representatives
Preceded by James C. Corman	Member of the U.S. House of Representatives from California's 21st congressional district 1981–1987	Succeeded by Elton Gallegly
