= Gun Owners of America =

American gun rights organization

- Founded: November 9, 1976; 49 years ago
- Tax ID no.: 52-1256643
- Legal status: 501(c)(4)
- Headquarters: Springfield, Virginia, US
- Coordinates: 38.8075°N 77.2196°W
- Members: 2,000,000+
- Founder: H.L. Richardson
- Senior Vice President: Erich Pratt
- Revenue: $2,152,940 (2015)
- Expenses: $2,319,763 (2015)
- Employees: 14 (2015)
- Website: www.gunowners.org

Gun Owners of America (GOA) is a gun rights organization in the United States. It makes efforts to differentiate itself from the larger National Rifle Association (NRA) and has publicly criticized the NRA on multiple occasions for what it considers to be compromising on gun rights.

The GOA was outspoken in opposing John McCain's 2008 presidential bid, describing his gun-rights voting record as "abysmal, wretched, and pathetic" and giving him an F− grade on Second Amendment issues since 2004, while the NRA (through its political action committee, the NRA-PVF) gave him a C+.

The GOA has been described by Congressman Ron Paul as "The only no-compromise gun lobby in Washington." This quote from Paul is displayed on the home page of the Gun Owners of America website. Paul was the only 2008 presidential candidate to receive an A+ grade from Gun Owners of America.

== History ==
Gun Owners of America (GOA) was founded in 1976 by California state senator H. L. Richardson. The GOA lobbies both state and federal legislatures to promote Second Amendment rights. Richardson was chairman of Gun Owners of America until he retired in 2017. Tim Macy, who had been on the board since the organization’s founding, then became chairman.

Tim Macy is president and chairman of the Board of Gun Owners of America. He has been on the Board of Directors for over 35 years since the inception of GOA. Macy is involved with GOA’s sister organization as well. Serving on the boards of Gun Owners Foundation, Gun Owners of America’s Political Victory Fund and Gun Owners of California.

John Velleco serves as the executive vice president. He previously served as the director of federal affairs for the organization.

Erich Pratt is the senior vice president for GOA, having worked in gun politics for over three decades. Erich served under several titles at GOA – from federal and state directors to communications director for the organization. He now serves as the chief national spokesman and focuses on policy for both the federal and state levels of government.

Sam Paredes is a board member of GOA and currently serves as the executive director for GOA’s sister organization, Gun Owners of California. Paredes is a certified firearms instructor.

== Activities ==
Gun Owners of America is a 501(c)(4) nonprofit organization. According to Gun Owners of America's website, its board contends that Americans have lost some of their gun rights, and GOA strives to get them back.

By its own account, Gun Owners of America spent over $1.75 million lobbying Congress in 2004, and over $18 million between 1998 and 2004. Gun Owners of America's Federal Political Action Committee is "Gun Owners of America Inc. Political Victory Fund" (C00278101). It raises funds to support the election of pro-gun candidates at all levels of government.

Gun Owners Foundation is an educational nonprofit foundation. It acts as the research arm for GOA. Its main objective is to hold seminars around the country to inform the public, media outlets, and various government officials on Second Amendment issues. The Gun Owners Foundation around 2008 began a new campaign by creating public service announcements to promote what it calls "PROPER Gun Safety". According to Gun Owners Foundation, its campaign objective is "to generate public awareness of the dangers of not having a gun ready for protection and to encourage gun owners not to lock up their best means of self-defense".

== GOA victories ==
On July 13, 2006, Senator David Vitter saw an 84–16 vote for his amendment prohibiting the use of federal money for federal agents to confiscate weapons during a declared state of emergency.

On June 27, 2007, the Pence Amendment passed. The bill, named after then-representative and future vice president Mike Pence, was passed by a vote of 309–115. According to Gun Owners of America, the amendment blocked the Federal Communications Commission's ability to use the Fairness Doctrine to limit the free speech allowed by organizations like Gun Owners of America over the airwaves.

On August 9, 2007, Gun Owners of America supported Vitter's work in pushing through a bill stating that no U.S. funds can be used by the United Nations or any group affiliated with the United Nations to restrict or tax Second Amendment rights. If they attempt to do so, the U.S. can withdraw their funds from the organization. This bill, HR-2764, also known as the Consolidated Appropriations Act, passed by an 81–10 vote.

On February 25, 2008, Senator Jim DeMint amended bill S-1200, the Indian Health Care Improvement Act. The act stated that the funds were to be used for "violence prevention". Once the funds were attempted to be used for gun buybacks, DeMint pushed through an amendment to the act stating that the money cannot be used for any anti-gun programs. DeMint's amendment passed by a margin of 78–11.

2010, GOA campaigns for and helps pass the Firearms Freedom Act laws across the country including Alaska, Arizona, Idaho, South Dakota, Utah and Wyoming.
