= High Tech Los Angeles =

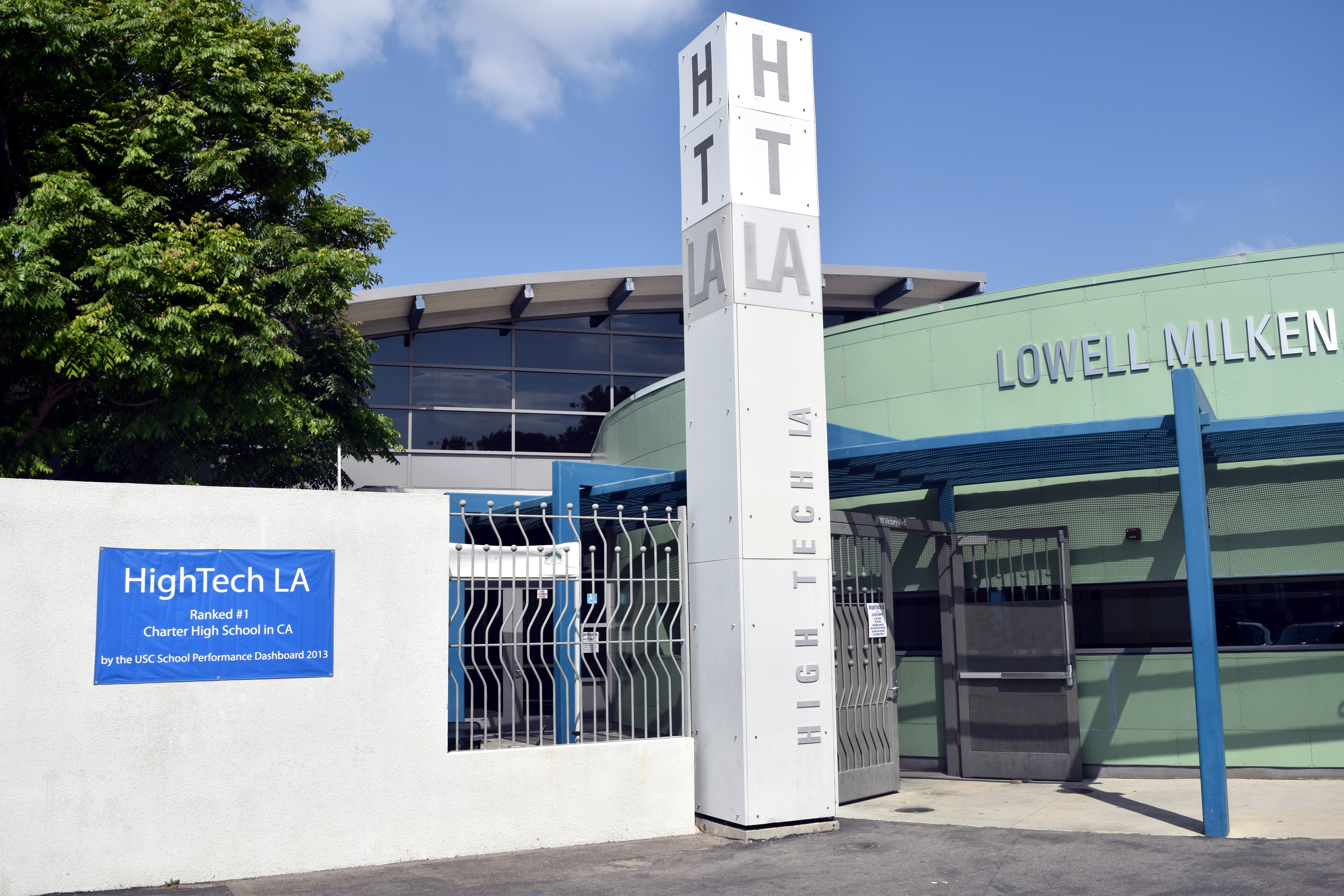
- The front of the school

Location
- Lake Balboa, CA, on the site of Birmingham High School; United States
- 34°11′14″N 118°30′22″W

Information
- Type: Charter school
- Established: 2002
- School district: LAUSD
- Superintendent: Austin Beutner
- Principal: Colleen Molina
- Grades: 9–12 (high school)
- Enrollment: 390 (2015-16)
- Website: ht-la.org

High Tech Los Angeles, or HTLA is an American charter high school located in Lake Balboa, CA, in the San Fernando Valley. It is located on the site of Birmingham High School, but it has its own separate buildings.

== History ==
High Tech LA was conceived in 2002 by entrepreneur Roberta Weintraub as a school to prepare students for the 21st century. It was modeled after the successful chain of High Tech High schools, being formerly called High Tech High Los Angeles. It opened in 2002 and became the nation's first charter high school operating from the campus of another public school, Birmingham High. By 2004 more permanent buildings had been built. The school was accredited by the Western Association of Schools and Colleges and it 2007 was named a California Distinguished High School.

In 2013, it was named the best charter high school in all of California by the USC School Performance Dashboard. In December 2017, High Tech LA's charter was renewed by the Los Angeles Unified School District (LAUSD) board for another five years. It received a second California Distinguished High School designation in 2019.

== Education ==
The school is small with nearly 400 students enrolled as of the 2016-2017 school year. The school targets low income families, with 50% of students on the Federal Free/Reduced lunch program. 53% of students who go to college from HTLA will be first in their families to attend college. Latinos make up 33% of the population.

The HTLA curriculum is based around getting into college. All students will complete the University of California/California State University "A-G" requirements to apply to one of the colleges in those college systems. All students must take one semester of internship with a professional.

Technology is also central at the school, with each student getting their own personal school laptop/netbook.
