= John F. Kennedy: Years of Lightning, Day of Drums =

- Directed by: Bruce Herschensohn
- Written by: Bruce Herschensohn
- Produced by: George Stevens Jr.
- Narrated by: Gregory Peck; Maximilian Schell
- Music by: Bruce Herschensohn
- Production company: United States Information Agency
- Distributed by: Embassy Pictures
- Release dates: December 1964 (Philippines); 1966
- Running time: 90 minutes
- Country: United States

John F. Kennedy: Years of Lightning, Day of Drums is a 1964 filmed memorial tribute to President John F. Kennedy, who was assassinated on November 22, 1963. It was completed in 1964, and released to theatres by Embassy Pictures in 1966. The film, containing both color and black-and-white footage, is narrated by Gregory Peck, and features extensive excerpts from President Kennedy's speeches, including color footage of his swearing in and inaugural address. It was written and directed by Bruce Herschensohn, who also composed the music. Maximilian Schell narrated the German version.

Because Years of Lightning... was produced by the United States Information Agency, it was originally prohibited by law from being screened in the United States; it first premiered at the Rizal Theater in Makati, Rizal in the Philippines in late 1964, with First Lady Eva Macapagal in attendance. However, the quality of the film was considered so outstanding that a special act of Congress allowed it to be shown in regular American motion picture theatres, a rare honor for USIA films. Two years after the film's actual completion, it made its debut in regular movie houses. A soundtrack album from the film, featuring both music and narration was also issued, but it is unavailable on CD.

The film concentrates on his public achievements in office, among them the launching of the Peace Corps, the successful resolution of the Cuban Missile Crisis, the successful attempt to put American astronauts into outer space, the beginning of the Alliance for Progress, the signing of the Nuclear Test Ban Treaty, and Kennedy's original drafting of the Civil Rights Act of 1964, alternating coverage of these achievements with somber footage of the funeral procession carrying Kennedy's casket.

The film was preserved by the Academy Film Archive, in conjunction with Warner Brothers, in 2014.

The film was released on DVD from Warner Home Video on November 12, 2013.

== See also ==
- Cultural depictions of John F. Kennedy
