= H. L. Richardson =

American gun rights activist (1927–2020)

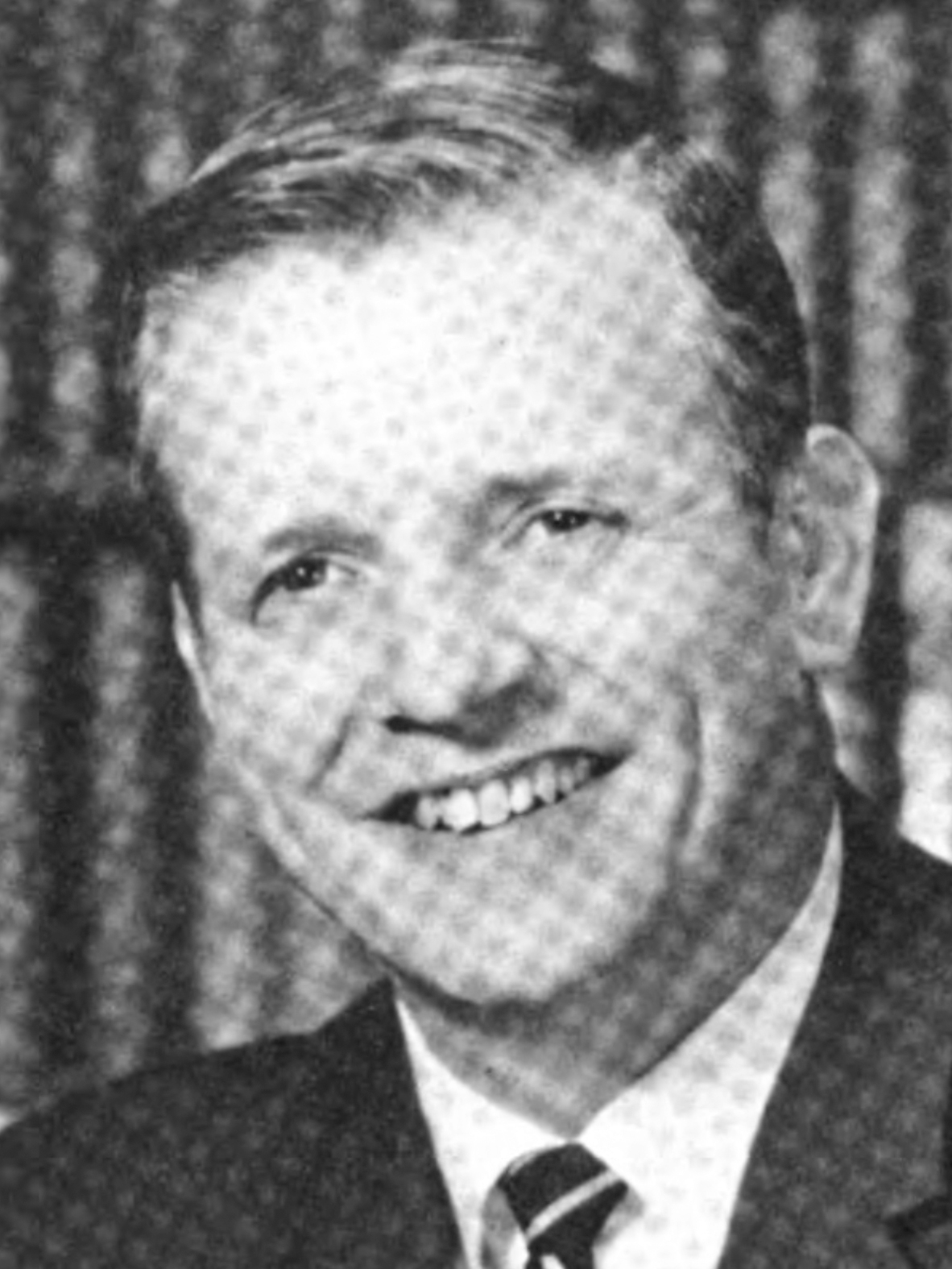
- Official portrait, 1971

Member of the California State Senate
- In office December 6, 1976 – November 30, 1988
- Preceded by: Robert S. Stevens
- Succeeded by: Bill Leonard
- Constituency: 25th district
- In office January 2, 1967 – November 30, 1976
- Preceded by: Albert S. Rodda
- Succeeded by: Lou Cusanovich
- Constituency: 19th district

Personal details
- Born: Hubert Leon Richardson; December 28, 1927 Terre Haute, Indiana, U.S.
- Died: January 13, 2020 (aged 92) California, U.S.
- Party: Republican
- Spouse: Barbara Budrow
- Children: Doug Richardson, 2 others
- Education: Olympic College; Cornish College of the Arts

Military service
- Branch/service: United States Navy
- Battles/wars: World War II

Hubert Leon "Bill" Richardson (December 28, 1927 – January 13, 2020) was an American gun rights activist and former politician who founded Gun Owners of America (GOA) in 1976 and served as a California state senator from 1966 to 1989.

== Early life and education ==
Richardson was born in Terre Haute, Indiana, in 1927 and served in the United States Navy in World War II. He attended Olympic College and the Cornish Conservatory, both in Seattle, Washington.

== Career ==
Richardson's political career began as a member of the John Birch Society. He was elected to the California State Senate in 1966.

During his tenure in the State Senate, Richardson served as the Republican Caucus Chair for several of these years. He was an unsuccessful Republican candidate for the United States Senate in 1974, having been defeated by incumbent Alan Cranston. He ran for Congress in 1962, and again in 1992, losing to Democrat Vic Fazio.

Richardson was credited with electing seven members of the California senate between 1978 and 1980. He led a group of organizations, including Gun Owners of America, that spent up to $1 million to elect conservative candidates.

Richardson was the author of Confrontational Politics, a book that has served as a guide for right-wing political figures, activists, and organizations.

== Personal life ==
He died on January 13, 2020, at the age of 92.

== Bibliography ==
- Slightly to the Right. Whittier, California: Constructive Action, 1965.
- What Makes You Think We Read the Bills? Ottawa, Illinois: Caroline House, 1978.
- The Devil's Eye. Dallas: Word, 1995.
- The Shadows of Crazy Mountain. Dallas: Word, 1996.
- Split Ticket. Dallas: Word, 1996.
- Confrontational Politics. Ventura, California: Nordskog, 2010.

Party political offices
Preceded by Max Rafferty	Republican Party nominee for United States Senator from California (Class 3); 1974	Succeeded by Paul Gann
