= 1949 World Federalist California Resolution =

The 1949 World Federalist California Resolution was a measure passed by the California legislature that called on the United States Congress to amend the United States Constitution to allow for U.S. participation in a federal world government. It was introduced at the request of United World Federalists leaders Alan Cranston and Bob Walker.
