= The Five Cities of June =

1963 film

- Directed by: Bruce Herschensohn
- Written by: Bruce Herschensohn
- Produced by: George Stevens Jr.
- Narrated by: Charlton Heston
- Music by: Bernhard Kaun
- Distributed by: United States Information Agency
- Release date: 1963
- Running time: 36 minutes
- Country: United States
- Language: English

The Five Cities of June is a 1963 American short documentary film directed by Bruce Herschensohn. It was nominated for an Academy Award for Best Documentary Short.

This United States Information Agency-sponsored film details the events of June 1963 in five cities. In the Vatican, the election and coronation of Pope Paul VI; in the Soviet Union, the launch of a Soviet rocket as part of the Space Race with the United States; in South Vietnam, fighting between Communists and South Vietnamese soldiers; in Tuscaloosa, Alabama, United States, the racial integration of the University of Alabama opposed by Governor George Wallace; and in Berlin, President John F. Kennedy's visit to Germany and Rudolph Wilde Platz.

== See also ==
- Charlton Heston filmography
