= Robert Docter =

American educator (1928–2025)

Robert L. Docter
- Born: Robert Lloyd Docter; July 20, 1928; San Francisco, California, U.S.
- Died: November 3, 2025 (aged 97); Northridge, Los Angeles, California, U.S.
- Occupations: Educator; school board member; Salvation Army leader
- Known for: Ending corporal punishment in LAUSD; Advocacy of school integration
- Spouse: Dolores Diane Beecher (m. 1953; died 2025)
- Children: 6

Robert Lloyd Docter (July 20, 1928 – November 3, 2025) was an American educator, professor at California State University, Northridge, and member of the Los Angeles Board of Education. During his tenure on the board, he led the initiative to abolish corporal punishment in the Los Angeles Unified School District (LAUSD) and supported court-ordered mandatory busing to achieve racial integration. He was also a longtime lay leader in the Salvation Army and the founding editor of New Frontier Publications.

== Early life and education ==
Docter was born in San Francisco, California, to Salvation Army pastors Lloyd and Violet Docter. The family moved to Los Angeles in 1945, where he graduated from Fairfax High School in 1946. He earned a bachelor's degree in English from the University of California, Los Angeles, in 1952, and later completed both a master's degree in education (1956) and a doctorate in educational psychology (1960) at the University of Southern California.

From 1952 to 1954, Docter served in the U.S. Army at Fort Ord, where he played trumpet in the 6th Infantry Division Band. After completing military service, he taught at Vanalden Elementary School in Tarzana for six years.

== Academic career ==
Docter joined the education faculty of San Fernando Valley State College (now California State University, Northridge) in 1960, where he taught for more than five decades. He wrote about and taught classes on teaching methods, ethics in education, and the place of the arts and critical thinking in the curriculum.

== Los Angeles Board of Education ==
=== Election and early service ===
Docter was elected to the Los Angeles Board of Education in 1969. During his service, he supported changes in instructional practices and publicly criticized board member J. C. Chambers for remarks described as racist. He supported collective bargaining rights for teachers, but his endorsement by the teachers union was withdrawn in 1977 after he supported integrating faculty assignments.

=== Ban on corporal punishment ===
Docter was a principal proponent of eliminating corporal punishment in LAUSD. After several failed attempts, the board approved a districtwide ban in 1975 by a 4–3 vote. He argued that physical punishment should not be used as a disciplinary method in schools. The district implemented the ban over several years while adopting alternative disciplinary practices.

=== School integration and busing ===
As president of the Board of Education, Docter supported the court-ordered mandatory busing plan intended to address racial segregation within LAUSD. The program was met with significant opposition, especially in the San Fernando Valley, leading to threats against Docter and police protection at his home. He also faced pressure from integration advocates who urged more expansive districtwide action.

In 1977, he lost his reelection bid to anti-busing activist Bobbi Fiedler, who received 56% of the vote. Docter later stated that voluntary busing might have mitigated public resistance and reduced white flight.

== Salvation Army involvement ==
Docter was involved in the Salvation Army throughout his life. He met his future wife, Dolores Diane Beecher, at a Salvation Army summer camp, and the two married in 1953. He played in Salvation Army bands for more than 70 years, including over 50 appearances in the Tournament of Roses Parade, and led open-air services at Hollywood and Vine.

In 1983, Docter founded New Frontier Publications for the Salvation Army. He served as its editor until 2017 and wrote more than 600 columns. He was admitted to the Salvation Army's Order of the Founder in 1992, the organization's highest honor for a lay member.

== Publications ==
Docter authored three books:

- A View from the Corner (2008)
- Integrity: A Complete Life (2015)
- Lost and Found in Montana (2022)

== Personal life and death ==
Docter and his wife, Dolores, were married for 71 years until her death in April 2025. They had six children.

Docter died at his home in Northridge, Los Angeles, on November 3, 2025, due to neurological complications.
