= 1974 United States Senate election in California =

- November 5, 1974
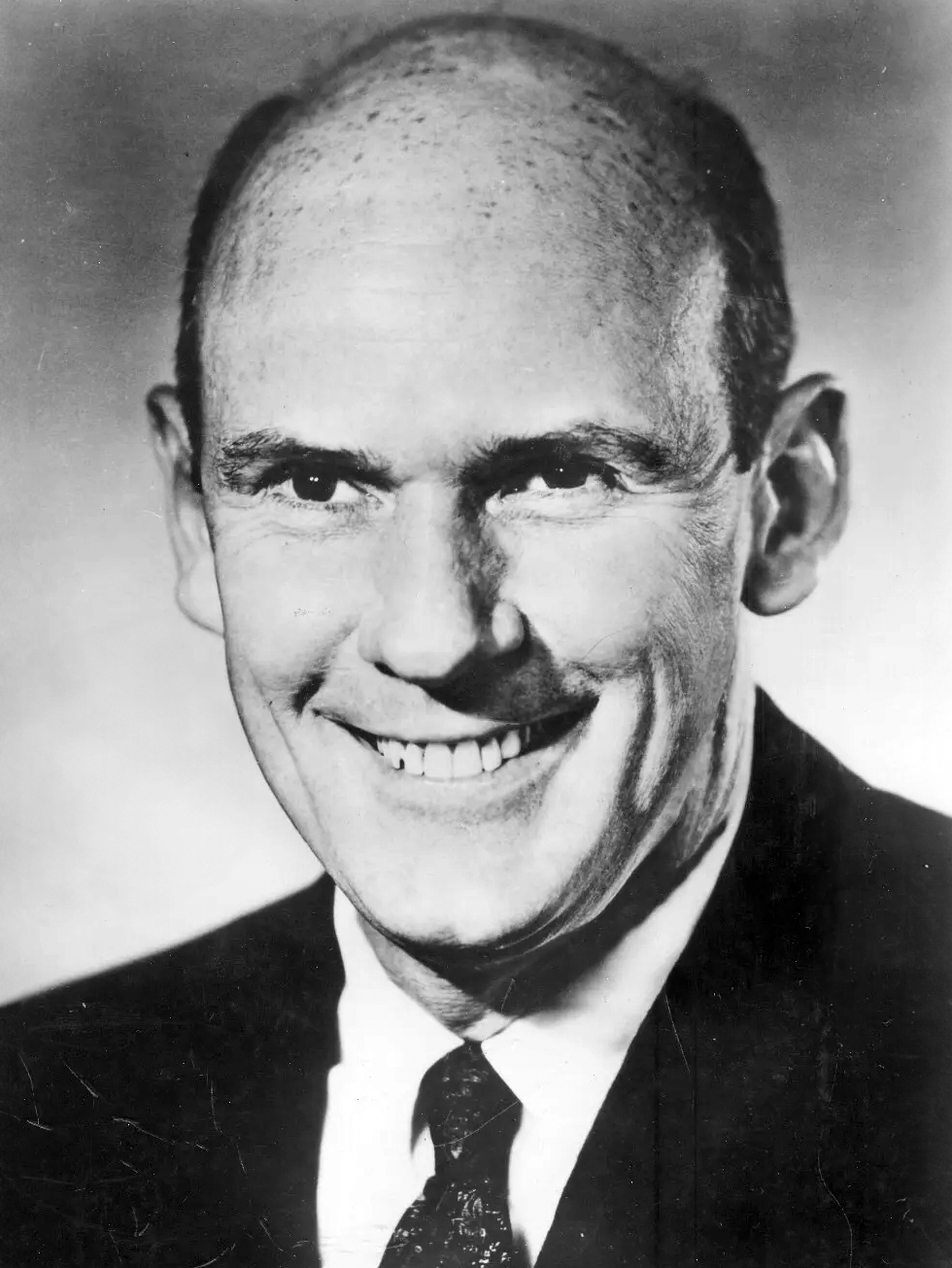

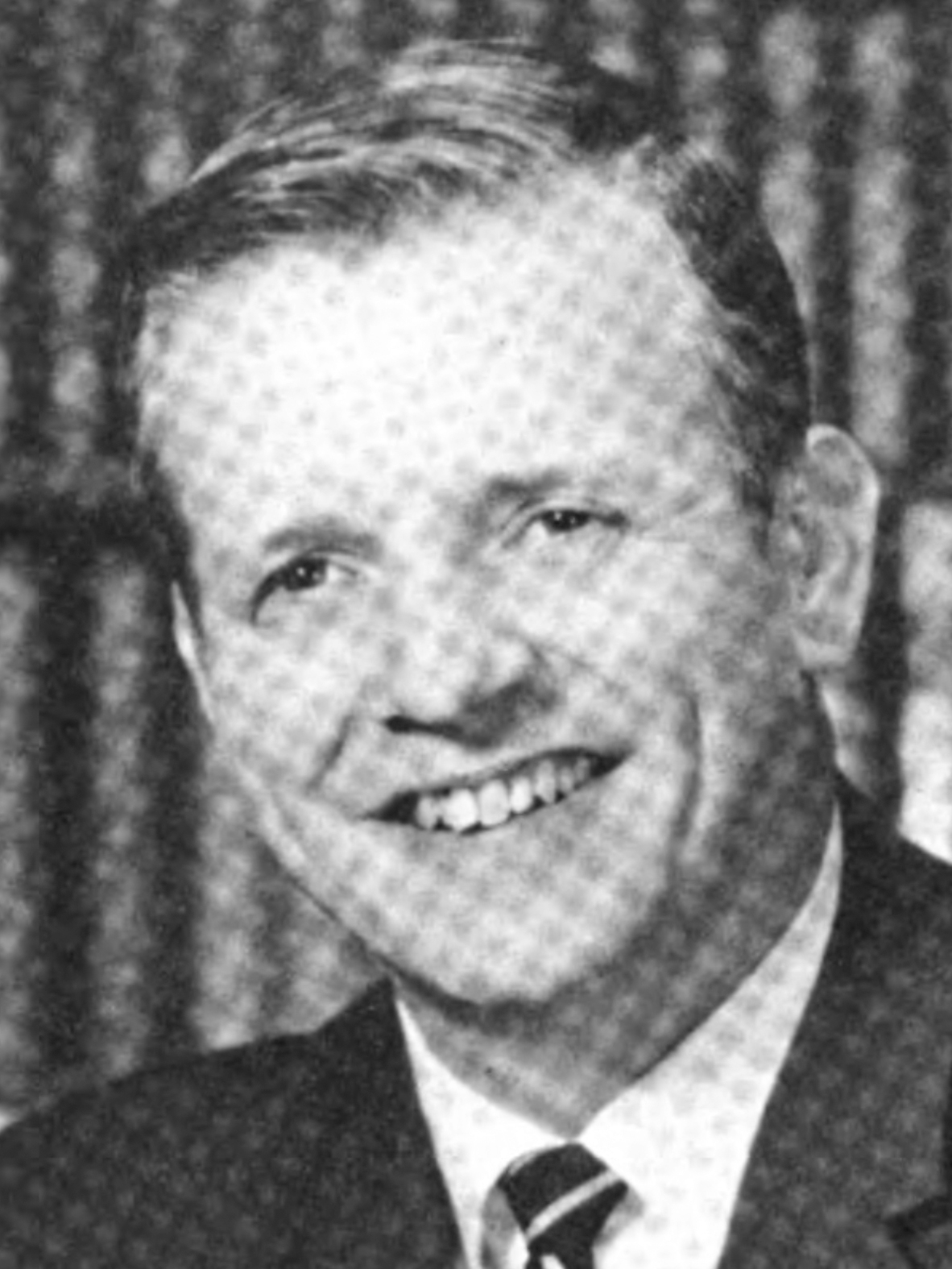
Nominee	Alan Cranston	H. L. Richardson
Party	Democratic	Republican
Popular vote	3,693,160	2,210,267
Percentage	60.52%	36.22%
- County results Cranston: 40–50% 50–60% 60–70% 70–80% Richardson: 40–50%
U.S. senator before election
Alan Cranston
Democratic
Elected U.S. Senator
Alan Cranston
Democratic

The 1974 United States Senate election in California was held on November 5, 1974. Incumbent Democrat Alan Cranston defeated Republican nominee H. L. Richardson with 60.52% of the vote.

Primary elections were held on June 4, 1974. In the general election, only Inyo County voted Republican. As of 2025, this was the last time Orange County voted Democratic in a Senate election contested by both political parties. (Note: Excluding 2016 and 2018, when two Democrats advanced to the general election and the county voted Democratic.)

== Democratic primary ==
=== Candidates ===
- Alan Cranston, incumbent United States senator
- Howard L. Gifford
- Frank Kacsinta

=== Results ===
Democratic primary results
Party	Candidate	Votes	%
Democratic	Alan Cranston (incumbent)	2,262,574	83.54
Democratic	Howard L. Gifford	318,080	11.75
Democratic	Frank Kacsinta	127,149	4.70%
Total votes		2,707,803	100.00

== Republican primary ==
=== Candidates ===
- Earl Brian, California secretary of health and welfare
- James E. Johnson
- Thomas A. Malatesta
- William H. Reinholz
- H. L. Richardson, state senator from Pasadena

=== Results ===
Republican primary results
Party	Candidate	Votes	%
Republican	H. L. Richardson	1,061,986	64.64
Republican	Earl W. Brian	273,636	16.65
Republican	James E. Johnson	118,715	7.23
Republican	William H. Reinholz	107,217	6.53
Republican	Thomas A. Malatesta	79,955	4.87
Total votes		1,641,509	100.00

== General election ==
=== Candidates ===
- Alan Cranston, incumbent United States senator (Democratic)
- Gayle M. Justice (Peace and Freedom)
- Jack McCoy (American Independent)
- H. L. Richardson, state senator from Pasadena (Republican)

=== Results ===
1974 United States Senate election in California
Party	Candidate	Votes	%	±%
Democratic	Alan Cranston (incumbent)	3,693,160	60.52%	
Republican	H. L. Richardson	2,210,267	36.22%	
American Independent	Jack McCoy	101,145	1.66%	
Peace and Freedom	Gayle M. Justice	96,436	1.58%	
Majority		1,482,893		
Turnout		6,102,432		
Democratic hold		Swing		
