= Ed Zschau =

American management consultant and politician

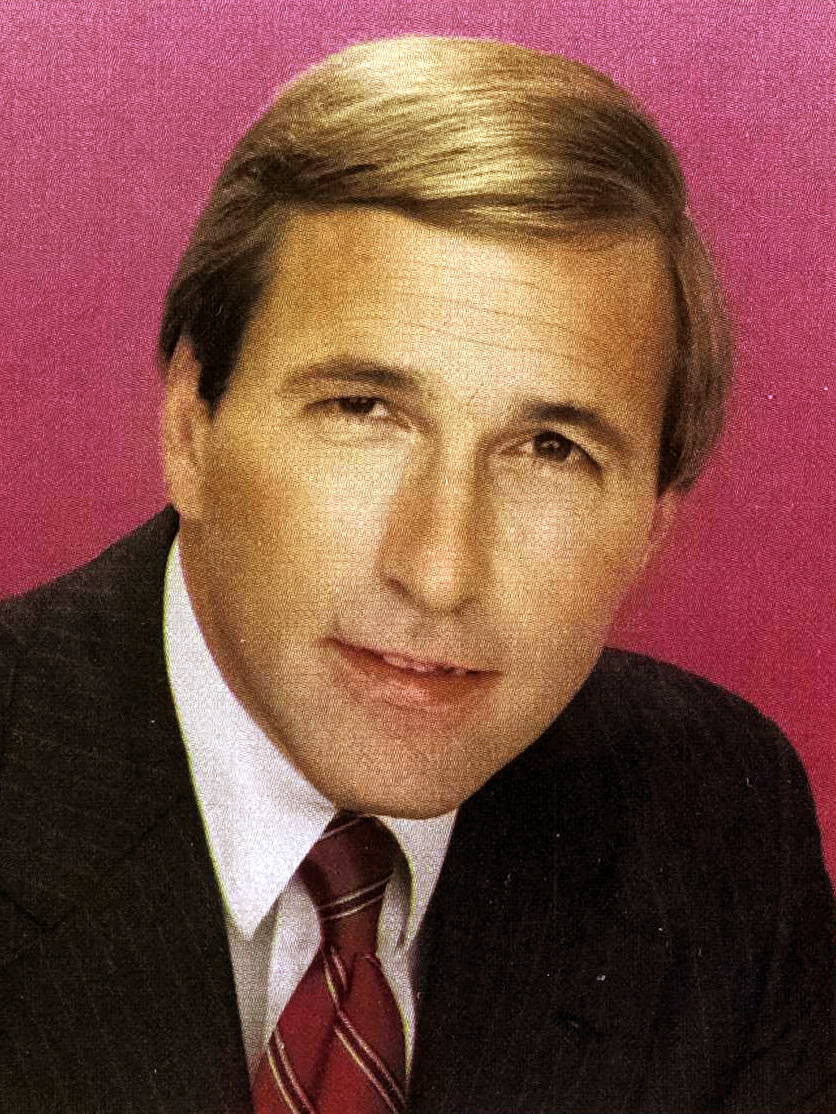
- Zschau in 1986

Member of the U.S. House of Representatives from California's 12th district
- In office January 3, 1983 – January 3, 1987
- Preceded by: Pete McCloskey
- Succeeded by: Ernie Konnyu

Personal details
- Born: Edwin Van Wyck Zschau; January 6, 1940 (age 86) Omaha, Nebraska, U.S.
- Party: Republican
- Other political affiliations: Reform (1996)
- Education: Princeton University (BA); Stanford University (MBA, MS, PhD)

Edwin Van Wyck Zschau (/ˈɛdwɪn ˈvæn wɪk ˈʃaʊ/; born January 6, 1940) is an American educator who represented California's 12th District in the United States House of Representatives from 1983 to 1987. In 1986, he was the unsuccessful Republican nominee for the U.S. Senate, losing to incumbent Democrat Alan Cranston by a narrow margin.

Zschau briefly re-entered the political arena as the vice presidential running mate to former Colorado Governor Dick Lamm, a Democrat, who challenged Ross Perot for the Reform Party presidential nomination in 1996.

== Early life ==
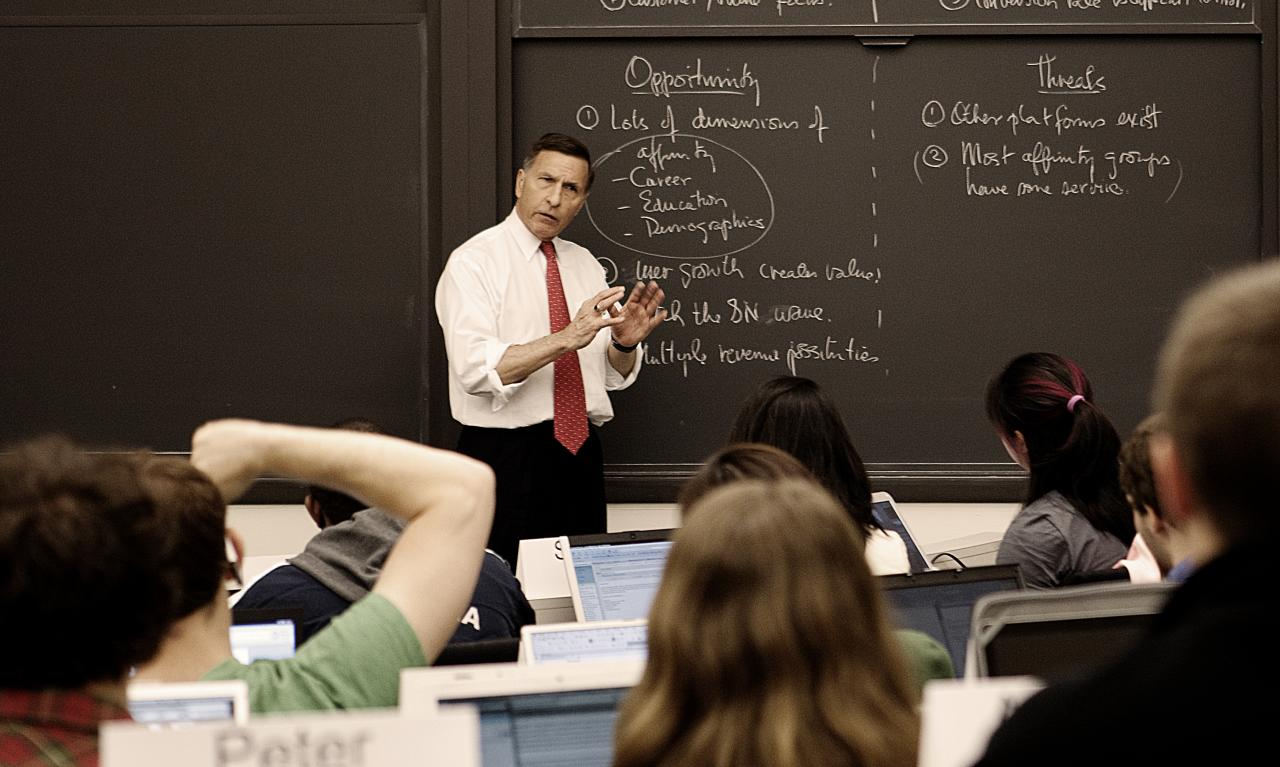
Zschau giving a lecture at Princeton University

Zschau was born in Omaha, Nebraska and was a figure skating champion in his teenage years.

Zschau graduated cum laude with an A.B. in philosophy from Princeton University in 1961 after completing a senior thesis titled "Space Time and Geometry from Kant to Einstein." He also holds M.B.A., M.S. (statistics), and Ph.D. degrees from Stanford University.

== Political career ==
In 1986 he ran as the Republican candidate for a seat in the United States Senate. He prevailed in a crowded Republican primary that included, among others, conservative commentator Bruce Herschensohn, Los Angeles County supervisor Michael D. Antonovich and Congresswoman Bobbi Fiedler, but then lost to incumbent Democrat Alan Cranston by a narrow margin.

== Academic career ==
During the 1960s, Zschau was for five years an assistant professor at the Stanford Graduate School of Business, teaching courses in computer systems, management science, and business policy. In 1967–68 he was a visiting assistant professor at the Harvard Business School, where he taught the required first year MBA course in managerial economics.

On May 26, 2019, Zschau became the Interim President of Sierra Nevada College, a role he held until the appointment of his successor the following year.

Zschau is currently a visiting lecturer with rank of professor at Princeton University in the Departments of Electrical Engineering, Operations Research and Financial Engineering, and in the Keller Center for Innovation in Engineering Education. Prior to his current post at Princeton, from 1997 to 2000, he was professor of management at the Harvard Business School and a visiting professor at Princeton University. During his years at Princeton, Zschau was a professor and mentor to Tim Ferriss. In the summer of 2019, Zschau accepted a pro bono position as Interim President of Sierra Nevada University, in Incline Village, Nevada.

== Business career ==
In 1968 Zschau founded a computer company, System Industries. One of his collaborators in founding this company was Henry B. Eyring. Zschau served as CEO of System Industries from 1968 to 1981.

In 1987 Zschau became a general partner of Brentwood Associates, a Los Angeles-based venture capital firm, and in 1988, he was elected chairman and CEO of Censtor Corp., a company which had been founded by Brentwood to develop advanced magnetic recording components for disk drives. He was recruited to be chairman and CEO of AdStar, the IBM Storage Systems Division, in 1993.

Zschau is also the founding chairman, emeritus, and a member of the National Advisory Board of The Tech Museum of Innovation in San Jose, is on the board of scholars of the ACCF Center for Policy Research in Washington, D.C., and is a fellow of the California Council on Science and Technology. He serves as chairman of the board of NanoOpto Corporation, Princeton Power Systems, and StarTek, Inc. (NYSE), President of Polyera Corporation, as a director of The Reader's Digest Association, Inc. (NYSE), and Washington Live, Inc.

== Electoral history ==
1982 California 12th congressional district election
Party	Candidate	Votes	%
Republican	Ed Zschau	115,365	63.0%
Democratic	Emmett Lynch	61,372	33.5%
Libertarian	William C. "Bill" White	6,471	3.5%
Total votes		183,208	100.0%
Republican hold			

1984 California 12th congressional district election
Party	Candidate	Votes	%
Republican	Ed Zschau (Incumbent)	155,795	61.7%
Democratic	Martin Carnoy	91,026	36.0%
Libertarian	William C. "Bill" White	5,872	2.3%
Total votes		252,963	100.0%
Republican hold			

1986 United States Senate election in California
Primary election
Party	Candidate	Votes	%
Republican	Ed Zschau	737,384	37.12%
Republican	Bruce Herschensohn	587,852	29.59%
Republican	Michael D. Antonovich	180,010	9.06%
Republican	Bobbi Fiedler	143,032	7.20%
Republican	Edward M. Davis	130,309	6.56%
Republican	Robert W. Naylor	60,820	3.06%
Republican	Art Laffer	47,288	2.38%
Republican	Joe Knowland	35,987	1.81%
Republican	Eldridge Cleaver	23,512	1.17%
Republican	George Montgomery	16,374	0.82%
Republican	William B. Allen	12,990	0.65%
Republican	William H. Pemberton	6,698	0.34%
Republican	John W. Spring	4,478	0.23%
Total votes		1,986,374	100.00%
General election
Democratic	Alan Cranston (incumbent)	3,646,672	49.29%
Republican	Ed Zschau	3,541,804	47.87%
American Independent	Edward B. Vallen	109,916	1.49%
Libertarian	Breck McKinley	66,261	0.90%
Peace and Freedom	Paul Kangas	33,869	0.46%
Independent	John W. Spring (write-in)	12	0.00%
Independent	Sam Manuel (write-in)	11	0.00%
Independent	John Hancock Abbott (write-in)	4	0.00%
Total votes		7,398,549	100.00%
Democratic hold			

U.S. House of Representatives
Preceded by Pete McCloskey	Member of the U.S. House of Representatives from California's 12th congressional district 1983–1987	Succeeded by Ernie Konnyu
Party political offices
Preceded by Paul Gann	Republican nominee for U.S. Senator from California (Class 3); 1986	Succeeded by Bruce Herschensohn
U.S. order of precedence (ceremonial)
Preceded by Steve Kagen as Former U.S. Representative	Order of precedence of the United States as Former U.S. Representative	Succeeded by William P. Baker as Former U.S. Representative
