= Roberta Weintraub =

American politician and entrepreneur (1935–2019)

- Born: Roberta Goldring; 1935; Los Angeles, California, U.S.
- Died: January 1, 2019 (aged 83–84)
- Education: University of California, Los Angeles (BA)
- Occupations: Politician, educator, entrepreneur
- Known for: Member and four-time president of the Los Angeles Board of Education; founder of the Police Academy Magnet School Program and High Tech Los Angeles
- Political party: Republican
- Spouses: Lewis Weintraub (divorced); Ira Krinsky
- Children: 2

Roberta Weintraub (née Goldring; 1935 – January 1, 2019) was an activist in the anti–school‑busing movement in Los Angeles who later was elected to the Los Angeles Board of Education. After leaving elected office, Weintraub founded educational programs and charter schools in Los Angeles.

== Early life and education ==
Roberta Weintraub was born in Los Angeles in 1935. Her family was Jewish. She was a third‑generation Angeleno, the daughter of Charles and Leona Goldring, and attended Fairfax High School. She graduated from UCLA in 1960, majoring in education with a minor in political science. During that time period she also worked on John F. Kennedy's presidential campaign and was an active participant in the civil rights movement. She later earned a certificate in state and local government from Harvard Kennedy School at Harvard University.

== Career ==
Weintraub first entered the political sphere when she worked for the Democratic Party in New York City before she was married. Later, as a physician's spouse in the mid-1970s, she began to lobby in Sacramento for medical malpractice laws that would be more advantageous for doctors, especially in regard to insurance premiums. Weintraub later said that her work on medical malpractice legislation led her to conclude that she could be more effective as a conservative, and she changed her registration to Republican.

As a parent in the San Fernando Valley, Weintraub became an activist in the anti school busing movement in the 1970s. She was elected to the Los Angeles School Board in 1979 after losing her first election in 1977. She served 14 years on the board and was elected president four times.

Weintraub was frequently outspoken in public debates, including once calling fellow board member Rita Walters a "bitch" on the radio and pushing for expulsion of students carrying weapons. She advocated for more magnet schools and helped open the first school‑based health clinics that dispensed contraceptives. The Los Angeles Times described Weintraub as a conservative who nevertheless worked with board members across ideological lines.

Weintraub left the Board of Education in 1993 and ran unsuccessfully for the Los Angeles City Council in 1995. She founded the Police Academy Magnet School Program in the late 1990s, creating a partnership between LAUSD and LAPD. The program eventually expanded to nine campuses and offered instruction in law enforcement, constitutional law, and criminal justice. She founded High Tech Los Angeles in 2004, a charter school focused on science, math, and technology.

In 2007, Weintraub helped establish the Police Orientation Preparation Program for young adults who had finished high school but were not yet old enough to enter police service. She hosted the Emmy‑winning television show School Beat. She also co-created Students Run LA, a running program for students.

== Personal life ==
Weintraub married Lewis Weintraub, a physician, with whom she had two sons, Richard and Michael. Michael died in a car accident in 1985 at the age of seventeen. She divorced Weintraub and later married Ira Krinsky. Weintraub had been a long-time resident of the San Fernando Valley, but she relocated from Sherman Oaks to the Westside, Los Angeles after the 1994 Northridge earthquake damaged her home.

== Death ==
Weintraub died on January 1, 2019, at the age of 83 after a long battle with glioblastoma.

== Legacy ==
After her death, former LAPD Chief William J. Bratton called Weintraub "the guardian angel of the Los Angeles law enforcement community." California State Senator Bob Hertzberg said that "she listened deeply (and) was a master at bridge building ... for a better LA and particularly for our children."
