= Bruce Herschensohn =

American television personality (1932–2020)

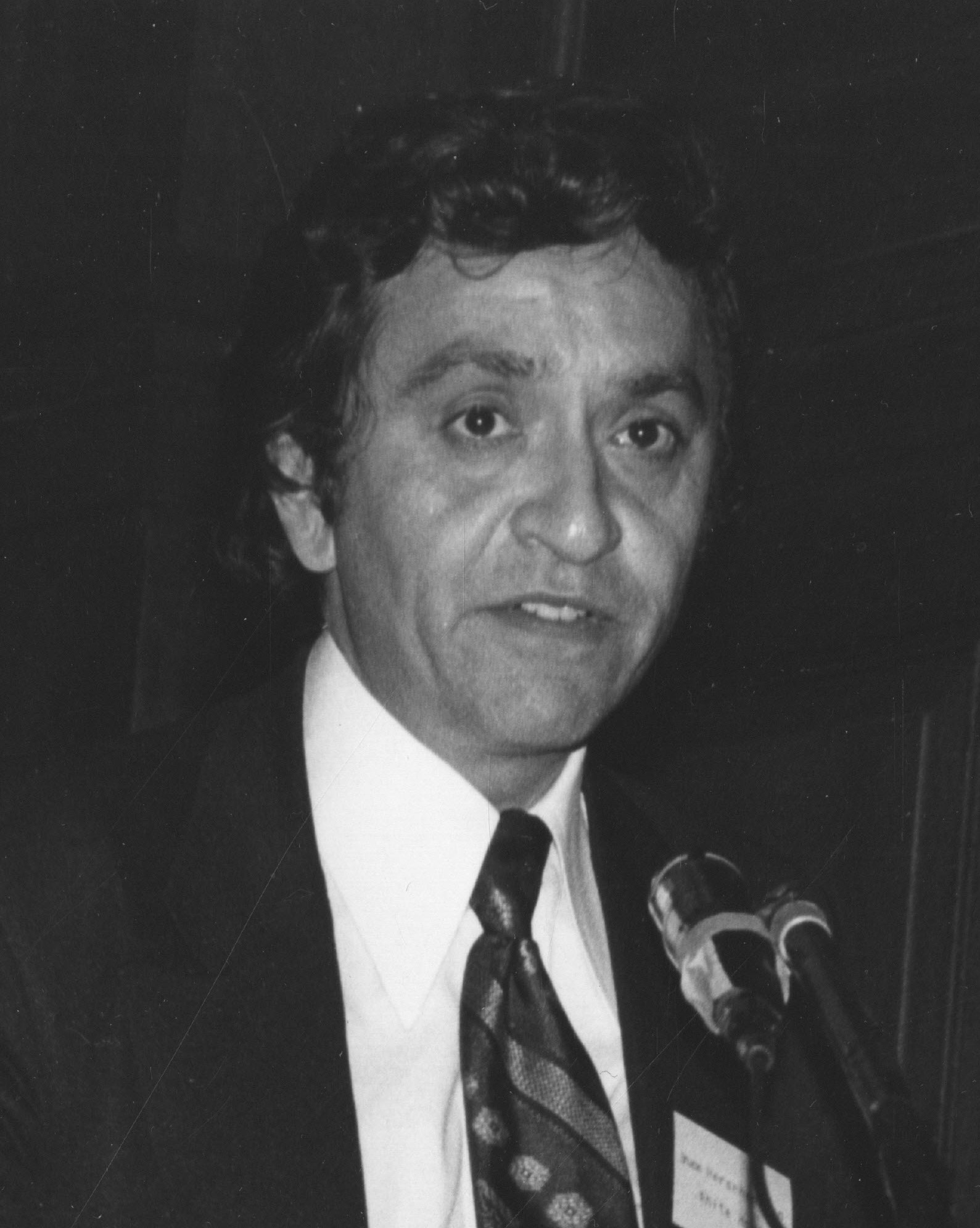
- Herschensohn in 1973
- Born: Stanley Bruce Herschensohn; September 10, 1932; Milwaukee, Wisconsin, U.S.
- Died: November 30, 2020 (aged 88)
- Occupation: Political commentator
- Spouse: Bunny Domenic

Stanley Bruce Herschensohn (September 10, 1932 – November 30, 2020) was an American conservative political commentator, author, film director, and senior fellow at the Pepperdine University School of Public Policy in Malibu, California.

Herschensohn quickly rose to prominence in the Republican Party, becoming a consultant to the Republican National Convention in 1972 and joining the Nixon administration on September 11, 1972. He served primarily as a speech writer. He left following Nixon's resignation, but served on the Ronald Reagan presidential transition team and as an official in the Reagan administration.

Previously, Herschensohn had been a Distinguished Fellow at the Claremont Institute and a fellow at the Institute of Politics at Harvard's John F. Kennedy School of Government in Cambridge, Massachusetts. He had taught politics at the University of Maryland, Whittier College and at Pepperdine University School of Public Policy.

== Early life and career ==
Herschensohn attended University High School in Los Angeles. He then joined the United States Air Force and served 1951–1952.

== Political campaigns ==
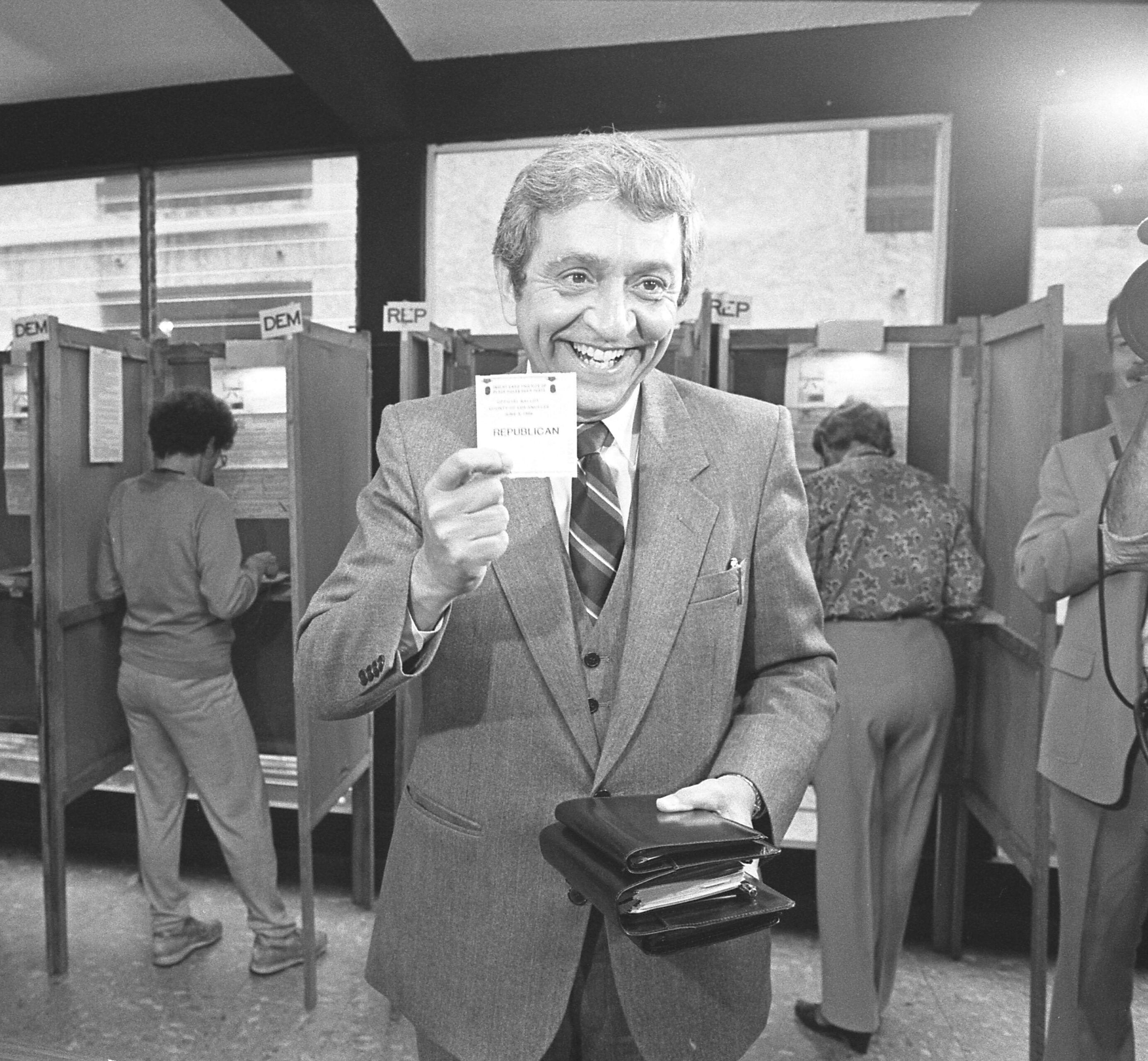
Herschensohn casting his vote in the 1986 U.S. Senate election.

=== Unsuccessful 1986 U.S. Senate primary campaign ===
In 1986, Herschensohn unsuccessfully sought the Republican nomination for the United States Senate seat held by Democrat Alan Cranston. He finished far ahead of the crowded pack in most of Southern California but finished second statewide to Silicon Valley Representative Ed Zschau, who won the nomination by plurality.

=== 1992 U.S. Senate election ===
In 1992, when Cranston retired, Herschensohn won the Republican nomination narrowly, defeating U.S. Representative Tom Campbell, a more moderate Republican who had been on the faculty of Stanford University and who had been elected to Zschau's former Congressional seat. Herschensohn received 956,136 votes (38.2 percent) to Campbell's 895,970 (35.8 percent). The remaining 417,848 ballots (16.7 percent) went to Mayor Sonny Bono of Palm Springs, also a relative moderate. During the primary campaign and afterwards, Herschensohn became a close friend of Bono and encouraged his former rival to seek election to the United States House of Representatives in 1994.

Herschensohn lost the 1992 general election to the Democratic Party nominee Barbara Boxer, but received over one million votes more than the Republican presidential ticket of George H. W. Bush and Dan Quayle received in California during the same election. (Note: The 1992 presidential election featured a strong 3rd party candidate, Ross Perot, who had the effect of a spoiler candidate.) Herschensohn won more votes than any losing Senate candidate had ever gotten at the time, topping the count of Leo McCarthy (D-CA) in 1988. His record wasn't broken until Elizabeth Emken topped it in the 2012 California Senate race.

== Career ==
- RKO Pictures, Los Angeles
- Studio messenger, 1950–51
- In art department, 1953–55
- United States Air Force, 1951–52
- General Dynamics Corp., Convair Division, San Diego, California, film maker and director, 1955–56
- Self-employed film director, producer, and writer in Los Angeles, 1956–68
  - Director, John F. Kennedy: Years of Lightning, Day of Drums (1964)
- Member of board of trustees of American Film Institute, 1967
- U.S. delegation to International Film Festival
  - Chairman of delegation, Czechoslovakia, 1968
  - Member of delegation in U.S.S.R., 1969
- U.S. Information Agency, Washington, D.C., director of Motion Picture and Television Service, 1968–72
- Instructor for "U.S. Image Abroad" at the University of Maryland, 1972
- Member of board of governors of Charles Edison Memorial Youth Foundation
- Consultant to 1972 Republican National Convention
- White House, Washington, D.C. (Richard Nixon administration)
  - Staff assistant to president, 1972–73
  - Deputy special assistant, 1973–74
- Self-employed film director, producer, and writer, 1975–76
- Freelance writer, 1976–2020
- Ronald Reagan Presidential Transition Team, 1980
- Political commentator for Los Angeles KABC radio and TV stations, 1978–1991
- Senior Fellow, School of Public Policy at Pepperdine University, 2006–2020
- Nonresident Associate Fellow, Nixon Center
- Board of directors, Center for Individual Freedom

== Authorship ==
- The Gods of Antenna, Arlington House. (1976)
- Lost Trumpets: A Conservative's Map to America's Destiny, The Claremont Institute Press, Claremont, California. (1994)
- Hong Kong at the Handover (Editor), Lexington Books, Lanham, Maryland. (1999)
- Across the Taiwan Strait: Democracy: The Bridge Between Mainland China and Taiwan (Editor), Lexington Books. (2002)
- Passport: A Novel of The Cold War (1st ed.). New York: I Books. 2003. ISBN 978-0-7434-7984-4.
- Taiwan : the threatened democracy. Los Angeles: World Ahead Pub. 2006. ISBN 978-0-9778984-2-8. LCCN 2006933774.
- Above Empyrean : a novel of the final days of the war on Islamic terrorism (1st ed.). New York: Beaufort Books. 2008. ISBN 978-0-8253-0516-0.
- An American Amnesia: How the U.S. Congress Forced the Surrenders of South Vietnam and Cambodia. New York: Beaufort Books. 2010. ISBN 978-0-8253-0632-7.
- Obama's Globe: A President's Abandonment of US Allies Around the World. New York: Beaufort Books. 2012. ISBN 978-0825306853.
- Author of films:
  - "Tall Man Five-Five", (Strategic Air Command)
  - "Karma", International Communications Foundation
  - "The President", U.S. Information Agency
  - "Bridges of the Barrios", U.S. Information Agency
  - "The Five Cities of June", 1963, U.S. Information Agency
  - "John F. Kennedy: Years of Lightning, Day of Drums", 1965, U.S. Information Agency
  - "Eulogy to 5:02", 1965, U.S. Information Agency
- Contributor of stories to, among others:
  - Conservative Digest
  - Newsday
  - Newsweek
  - Human Events
  - Saturday Evening Post

== Awards ==
- Arthur S. Flemming Award, 1969
- Academy Award from Academy of Motion Picture Arts and Sciences, 1970, for short documentary film "Czechoslovakia: 1968"
- Academy Award nominations, 1969 and 1972
- Distinguished service award from U.S. Information Agency, 1972
- Award from Council Against Communist Aggression, 1972

== Electoral history ==
1986 Republican Senate primary
Party	Candidate	Votes	%
Republican	Ed Zschau	737,384	37.12%
Republican	Bruce Herschensohn	587,852	29.59%
Republican	Michael D. Antonovich	180,010	9.06%
Republican	Bobbi Fiedler	143,032	7.20%
Republican	Edward M. Davis	130,309	6.56%
Republican	Robert W. Naylor	60,820	3.06%
Republican	Art Laffer	47,288	2.38%
Republican	Joe Knowland	35,987	1.81%
Republican	Eldridge Cleaver	23,512	1.17%
Republican	George Montgomery	16,374	0.82%
Republican	William B. Allen	12,990	0.65%
Republican	William H. Pemberton	6,698	0.34%
Republican	John W. Spring	4,478	0.23%
Total votes		1,986,374	100.00%

1992 Republican Senate primary
Party	Candidate	Votes	%
Republican	Bruce Herschensohn	956,146	38.80%
Republican	Tom Campbell	859,970	34.90%
Republican	Sonny Bono	417,848	16.96%
Republican	Isaac Park Yonker	94,623	3.84%
Republican	Alexander Swift Justice	60,104	2.44%
Republican	John W. Spring	54,941	2.23%
Republican	John M. Brown	20,810	0.84%
Total votes		2,464,442	100.00%

1992 U.S. Senate election in California
Party	Candidate	Votes	%
Democratic	Barbara Boxer	5,173,467	47.90%
Republican	Bruce Herschensohn	4,644,182	43.00%
American Independent	Jerome N. McCready	373,051	3.45%
Peace and Freedom	Genevieve Torres	372,817	3.45%
Libertarian	June R. Genis	235,919	2.18%
Write-in	Joel Britton	110	0.00%
Write-in	John Cortese	101	0.00%
Write-in	Robert L. Bell	56	0.00%
Total votes		10,799,647	100.00
Democratic hold			

== Notes ==
Party political offices
Preceded by Ed Zschau	Republican Party nominee for United States Senator from California (Class 3); 1992	Succeeded by Matt Fong
