= Alan Cranston =

American politician and journalist (1914–2000)

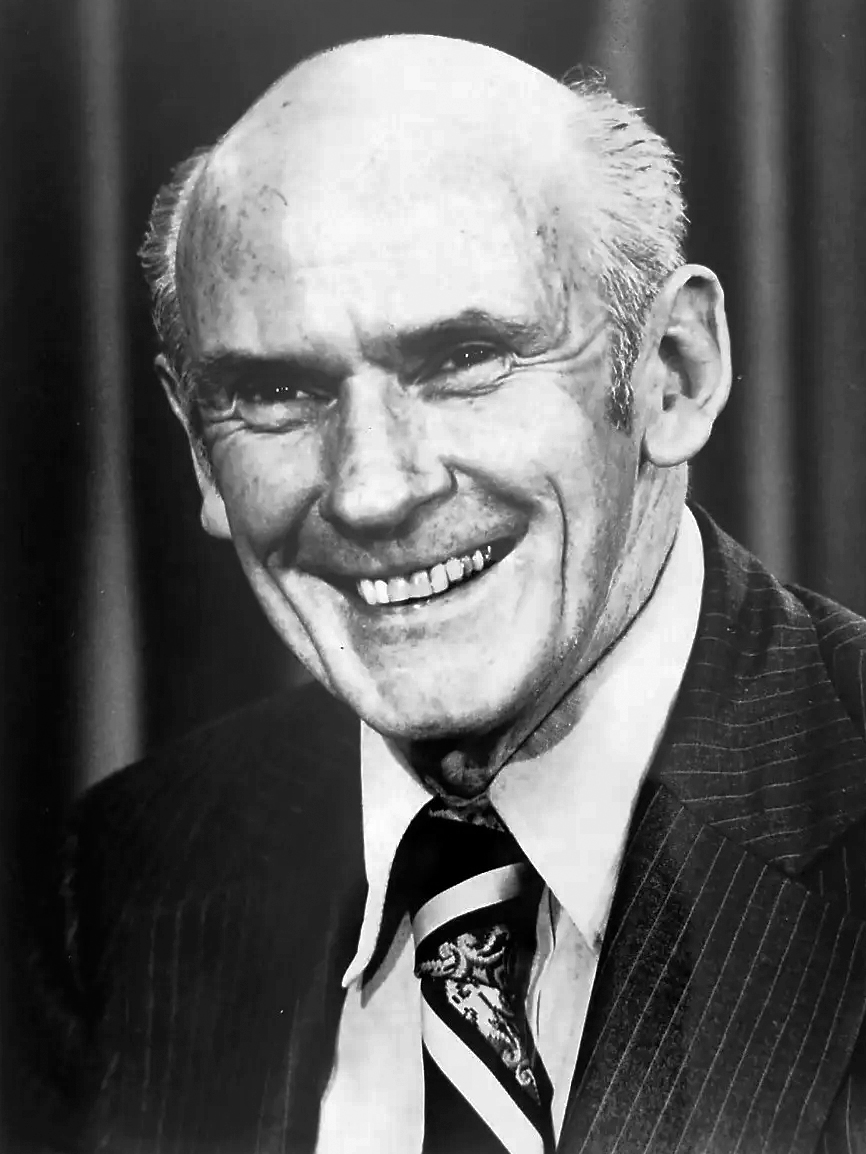
- Official portrait, 1977

United States Senator from California
- In office January 3, 1969 – January 3, 1993
- Preceded by: Thomas Kuchel
- Succeeded by: Barbara Boxer
Senate positions
Chair of the Senate Veterans Affairs Committee
In office January 3, 1987 – January 3, 1993
Preceded by	Frank Murkowski
Succeeded by	Jay Rockefeller
In office January 3, 1977 – January 3, 1981
Preceded by	Vance Hartke
Succeeded by	Alan K. Simpson
Senate Majority Whip
In office January 3, 1987 – January 3, 1991
Leader	Robert Byrd; George Mitchell
Preceded by	Alan K. Simpson
Succeeded by	Wendell Ford
In office January 3, 1977 – January 3, 1981
Leader	Robert Byrd
Preceded by	Robert Byrd
Succeeded by	Ted Stevens
Senate Minority Whip
In office January 3, 1981 – January 3, 1987
Leader	Robert Byrd
Preceded by	Ted Stevens
Succeeded by	Alan K. Simpson

25th Controller of California
- In office January 5, 1959 – January 2, 1967
- Governor: Pat Brown
- Preceded by: Robert C. Kirkwood
- Succeeded by: Houston I. Flournoy

Personal details
- Born: Alan MacGregor Cranston; June 19, 1914 Palo Alto, California, U.S.
- Died: December 31, 2000 (aged 86) Los Altos Hills, California, U.S.
- Party: Democratic
- Spouses: Geneva McMath (m. 1940; div. 1977) Norma Weintraub (m. 1978; div. 1989)
- Children: 2
- Education: Stanford University (BA)

Military service
- Allegiance: United States
- Branch/service: United States Army
- Years of service: 1944–1945
- Battles/wars: World War II
- Alan Cranston's voice Alan Cranston on legislation sanctioning South Africa for apartheid Recorded July 19, 1986

Alan MacGregor Cranston (June 19, 1914 – December 31, 2000) was an American politician and journalist who served as a United States senator from California from 1969 to 1993, and as President of the World Federalist Association from 1949 to 1952.

Born in Palo Alto, California, Cranston worked as a journalist after graduating from Stanford University. After serving as California State Controller, he was elected to the Senate in 1968. He served as the Senate Democratic Whip from 1977 to 1991. In 1984, Cranston sought the Democratic presidential nomination, advocating a nuclear freeze during the later stages of the Cold War. He dropped out after the first set of primaries.

In 1991, the Senate Ethics Committee reprimanded Cranston for his role in the savings and loan crisis as a member of the Keating Five. After being diagnosed with prostate cancer, he decided not to run for a fifth term. After his retirement from the Senate, he served as president of the Global Security Institute and advocated for the global abolition of nuclear weapons.

== Early life and education ==
Cranston was born in Palo Alto, California, the son of Carol (née Dixon) and William MacGregor Cranston. He attended Pomona College for one year and studied abroad for a summer at the National Autonomous University of Mexico before graduating from Stanford University in 1936 with a degree in English.

== Early career ==
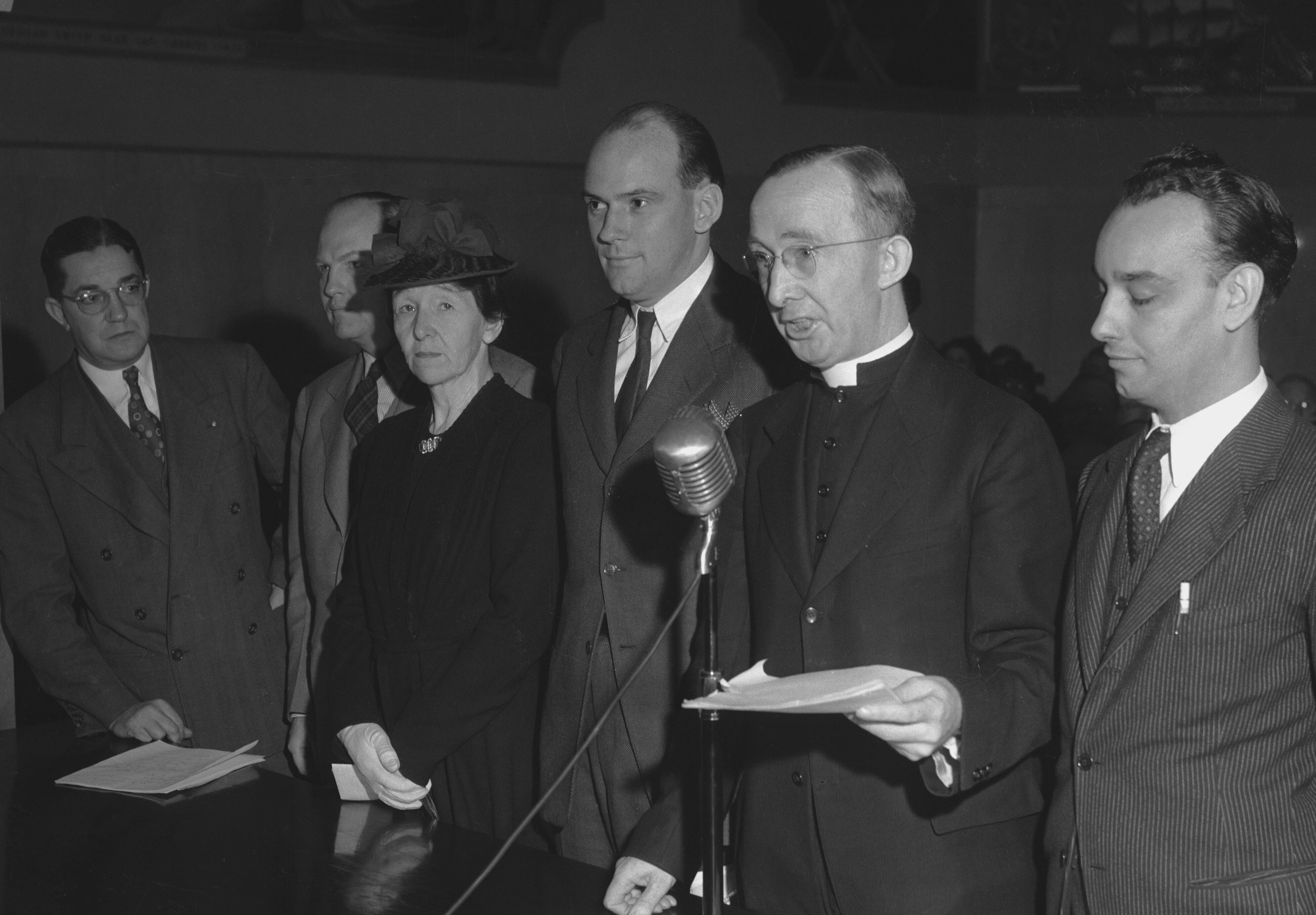
Cranston (third from right) with other authorities discussing the Zoot Suit Riots, 1943.

Cranston was a correspondent for the International News Service for two years before World War II. When an abridged English-language translation of Adolf Hitler's Mein Kampf was released, sanitized to exclude some of Hitler's antisemitism and militancy, Cranston published a different translation (with annotations) that he believed reflected the contents of the book more accurately. In 1939, Hitler's publisher sued him for copyright violation in Connecticut; a judge ruled in the publisher's favor and publication of the book was halted, but by then a half million copies had been sold, helping inform a wide audience about the threat Hitler posed.

Before enlisting in the armed forces in 1944, Cranston worked as an editor and writer for the magazine Common Ground, and later in the Office of War Information. Enlisting in the army as a private in 1944, he requested service with a combat unit after completing Infantry basic training, but was instead assigned to be editor of Army Talk magazine. While on active duty, he wrote a second book, The Killing of the Peace, a synopsis of the failed bid to get the United States to join the League of Nations immediately after World War I. Cranston held the rank of sergeant when he was discharged at the end of the war in 1945.

A supporter of world government, Cranston attended the 1945 conference that led to the Dublin Declaration. He organized California chapters of the UWF and served as the president of the national UWF from 1949 to 1952. He successfully pushed the California legislature to pass the 1949 World Federalist California Resolution, calling on Congress to amend the Constitution to allow U.S. participation in a federal world government. Also in the late 1940s, Cranston began his longstanding opposition to nuclear weapons.

In 1952, Cranston co-founded the California Democratic Council (CDC), and served as chairman. Since that time, the CDC has served as an unofficial coalition of local Democratic clubs that coordinate electoral activities and activism throughout California. The CDC provided substantial support to Cranston in his bid for State Controller in 1958 and his numerous runs for the U.S. Senate.

== Public office ==
=== State Controller ===
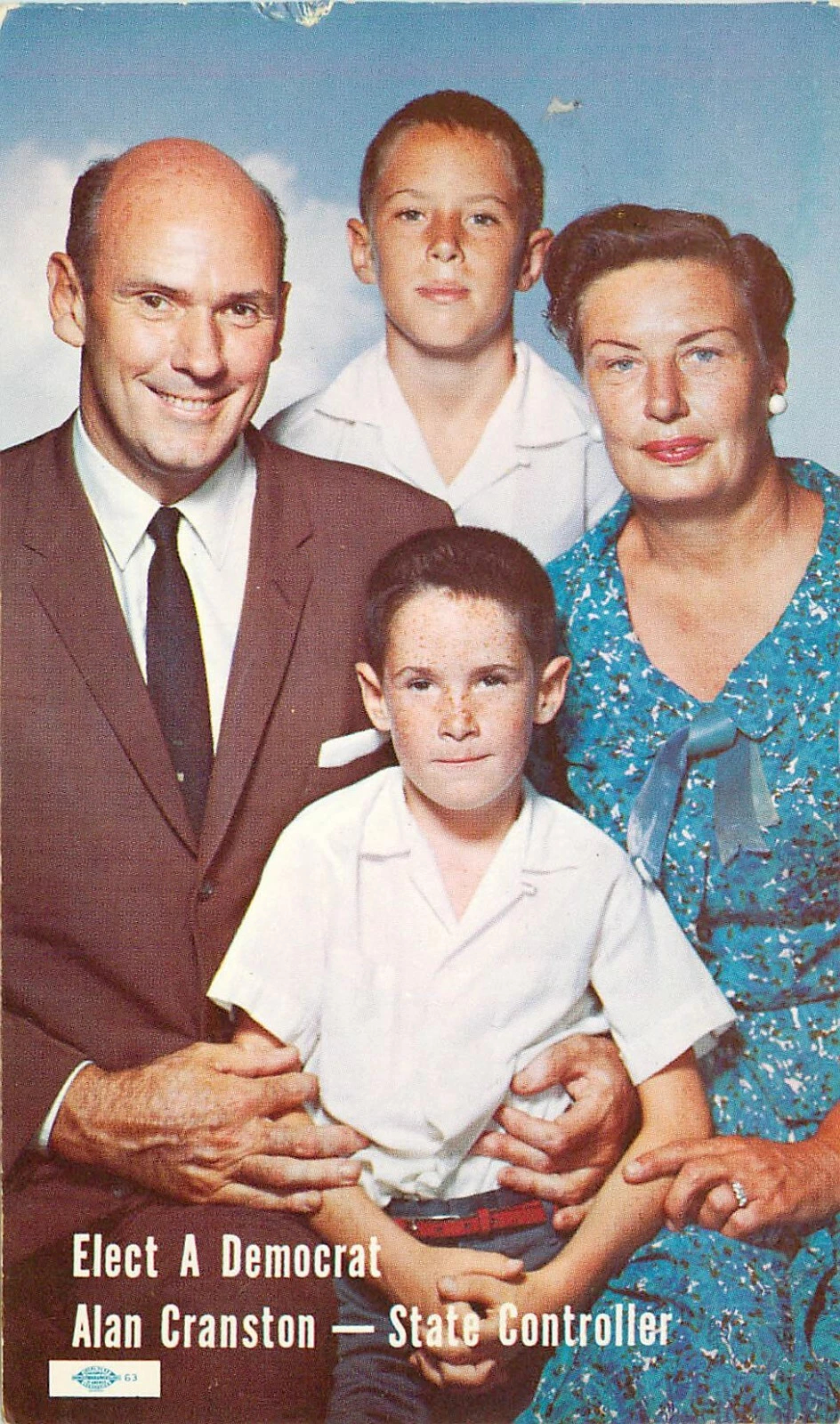
Cranston and his family on a campaign postcard, 1958

A Democrat, Cranston was elected California State Controller in 1958, reelected in 1962, and defeated for reelection in 1966. He was the first Democrat to hold the position since John P. Dunn left office in 1891.

=== U.S. Senator ===
Cranston first ran for the United States Senate in 1964. He lost the Democratic primary to former White House Press Secretary Pierre Salinger, who went on to lose the general election to Republican George Murphy.

In 1968, Cranston was elected to the first of four terms in the U.S. Senate, defeating Republican state Superintendent of Schools Max Rafferty in the general election after the staunchly conservative Rafferty had narrowly defeated the liberal Republican incumbent, Thomas Kuchel, in that party's primary.

The election was marred by mudslinging. A conservative writer, Frank Capell, authored a pamphlet suggesting that Cranston might have had Communist leanings in his youth, and that during his stint at the Office of War Information he helped falsely convince Franklin D. Roosevelt that Nazi Germany had perpetrated the Katyń massacre. Many of the same allegations were recycled in an article that ran in American Opinion in 1974 titled "Alan Cranston: The Shadow in the Senate". (The article's title was a reference to Lamont Cranston, the main character in the popular radio program The Shadow.)

During his first few months in office, Cranston introduced a resolution calling for President Nixon to halt closing 59 Job Corps Centers. He amended the original resolution to include a June 30 deadline that would allow Congress to do a study of the targeted facilities and removed language criticizing the Nixon administration for damaging trainees' lives by closing the facilities. In April 1969, the Senate Labor and Public Welfare Committee approved the revised Cranston proposal in a vote of 10 to 6. Cranston predicted victory for the resolution when it was taken up for a vote by the entire chamber, but the Senate defeated it on May 13, 1969, by a vote of 52–40.

In a September 12, 1971 statement, Cranston disputed the Pentagon's claims that military manpower and national security would be threatened if Congress did not renew Nixon's draft authority and said he would filibuster the draft measure.

In September 1973, Cranston introduced an amendment that would reduce American forces overseas by 20% in the next 18 months and would include naval forces. It was introduced as a fallback amendment to the 40% reduction in American forces overseas Senator Mike Mansfield had offered.

In November 1973, Cranston announced his support for the nomination of Gerald Ford as vice president. He said his support came after consulting "several hundred persons—Democrats and Republicans, business and labor leaders, elected politicians and party functionaries—in his own state of California" and finding little opposition to Ford.

On April 23, 1974, Cranston stated that members of the Veterans Administration had been encouraged to contribute to Nixon's reelection campaign and that head of the Veterans Administration Donald E. Johnson was privy to these activities. Cranston's allegations were corroborated later that day by a former VA employee.

In 1974, Cranston defeated Republican H. L. "Bill" Richardson, a conservative state senator previously affiliated with the John Birch Society. Cranston polled 3,693,160 votes (60.5%) to Richardson's 2,210,267 (36.2%).

In 1979, after 19 senators signed a letter indicating that their support for the SALT II treaty hinged on President Jimmy Carter's response to its impact on U.S. defense posture, Cranston said their concerns were legitimate but mostly did not "relate directly to the text of the SALT II treaty" and it was likely that their reservations about the treaty could be resolved without using killer amendments.

In 1980, Cranston defeated Republican Paul Gann, 4,705,399 (56.5%) to 3,093,426 (37.1%). His campaign was notable for a July 31 benefit that was the last concert the Eagles played at together for 14 years. During the event Cranston's wife thanked Eagles guitarist Don Felder for performing, to which Felder reportedly replied, "You're welcome...I guess." Bandmate Glenn Frey took exception to Felder's comment, leading to onstage bickering and the band's breakup immediately after the concert.

In March 1981, Cranston was one of 24 elected officials to issue a joint statement calling on the Reagan administration to find a peaceful solution to the Ulster conflict.

In April 1981, during a Senate floor speech, Cranston asserted that India and Pakistan had entered the final stages of their preparation for nuclear test sites, speculating that India "will decide to make another test at the Pokaran site in the next few months" and Pakistan "could produce the fissile materials for a similar test, perhaps by the end of this year, most likely by the end of 1982." He did not identify the source of his information, but senior Reagan administration officials verified "the gist of Senator Cranston's information."

Cranston was reelected in 1986, narrowly defeating Republican nominee Congressman Ed Zschau after an expensive and heated election.

On October 2, 1990, Cranston was one of nine senators to vote against the nomination of David Souter for Associate Justice of the Supreme Court.

=== Presidential candidate ===
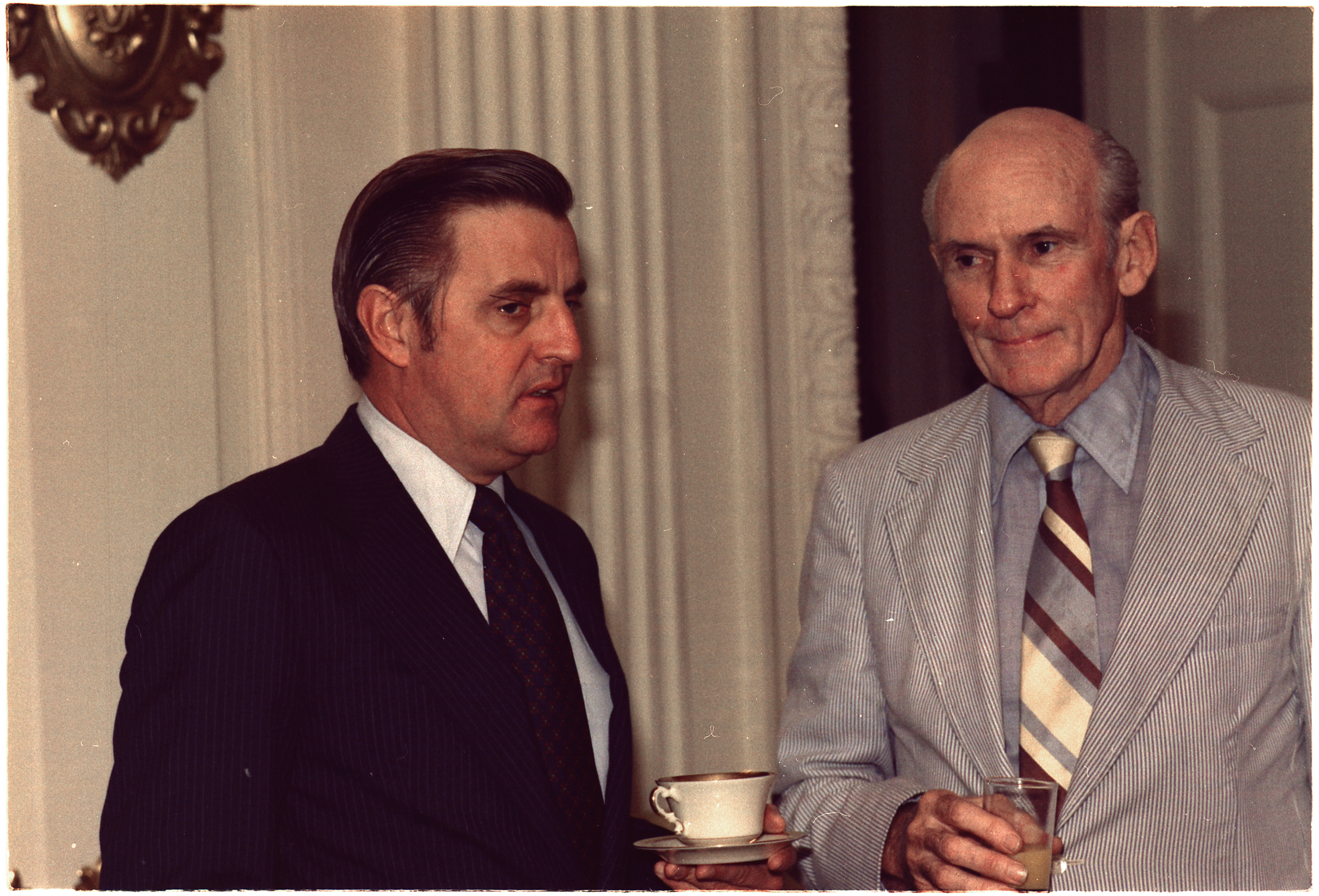
Cranston (right) with Vice President Walter Mondale, September 20, 1977

Cranston was Democratic Whip from 1977 to 1991.

He was an unsuccessful candidate for the Democratic presidential nomination for the 1984 election. He became the first announced candidate on February 1, 1983. Despite his age (69) and appearance that seemed even older (he dyed his little remaining white hair a color that most called orange), Cranston quickly became a recognized candidate. His strong support for a nuclear freeze won him an intense following among anti-nuclear activists, support that translated into campaign donations, committed staff (future Washington Senator Maria Cantwell moved to the state in 1983 to head up Cranston's caucus campaign effort there) and volunteers and straw poll victories in Wisconsin, California, and Alabama. However, the entry of George McGovern into the race in September 1983 cut into Cranston's support. He finished a weak fourth in Iowa in February 1984 and dropped out a week later after finishing seventh out of eight candidates in New Hampshire, with only two percent of the vote.

Cranston also faced a campaign debt of $2 million from his 1984 run as he began gearing up for an expensive and tough re-election fight in 1986, when he narrowly defeated Republican U.S. Representative Ed Zschau.

=== Reprimand ===
On November 20, 1991, Cranston was reprimanded by the U.S. Senate Select Committee on Ethics for "improper conduct" after Lincoln Savings head Charles Keating's companies contributed $850,000 to voter registration groups closely affiliated with Cranston. Keating had wanted federal regulators to stop "hounding" his savings and loan association. Although the committee found that "no evidence was presented to the Committee that Senator Cranston ever agreed to help Mr. Keating in return for a contribution", the committee deemed Cranston's misconduct the worst among the Keating Five.

Cranston announced his retirement from the Senate in 1991, citing his diagnosis of prostate cancer as the reason. However, it was widely speculated that his decision not to seek re-election was strongly influenced by the fallout from the savings and loan scandal. His involvement with Charles Keating and the subsequent Senate Ethics Committee reprimand had severely damaged his public image. Polls suggested that had he ran for reelection in 1992, he would likely lost. His successor in the Senate, Barbara Boxer, later expressed doubt that he would have stepped down if not for the Keating scandal.

=== Track and field ===
Throughout his public life, Cranston was notable for practicing and participating in the sport of track and field as a sprinter in special senior races. Many of the events, races for senior sprinters at major track meets, were the early events that became the sport of masters athletics. While on his many political trips, Cranston would spend time sprinting in long hotel hallways to maintain his fitness.

== Personal life ==
Cranston's family was wealthy, with investments in real estate. He married and divorced twice. His first wife, Geneva McMath, was the mother of his sons, Kim and Robin. Robin died in 1980 in a Los Angeles traffic accident.

Cranston later married Norma Weintraub. Weintraub was afflicted by Parkinson's disease. The two divorced in 1989.

== Retirement and death ==
After retiring from the Senate, Cranston largely stepped out of public view. He spent his later years dedicated to the global abolition of nuclear weapons, which had been central to his political career. In 1996, he became chairman of the Gorbachev Foundation USA, a San Francisco-based think tank founded by former Soviet President Mikhail Gorbachev to advance world peace and nuclear arms control. He also served as Chairman of the State of the World Forum, where he led efforts for nuclear disarmament through the Nuclear Weapon Elimination Initiative of the State of the World Forum. In 1999, he founded the Global Security Institute, a non-profit organization aiming for the global abolition of the use of nuclear weapons.

Cranston died from natural causes at his home in Los Altos Hills, California, on December 31, 2000, at the age of 86.

== Political positions ==
Cranston received a score of 100% from the AFL-CIO in 1969, 1970, 1972, and 1981 while his lowest score was 79% in 1977. His lowest score from Americans for Democratic Action was 72% in 1969 and his highest was 95% in 1982. The United States Chamber of Commerce gave him a score of 0% from 1969 to 1973, and in 1976.

== Works cited ==
- Wormser, Michael, ed. (1984). Candidates '84. Congressional Quarterly. ISBN 0871873125.

Political offices
Preceded by Robert C. Kirkwood	Controller of California; 1959–1967	Succeeded by Houston I. Flournoy
Party political offices
Preceded by Richard B. Richards	Democratic nominee for U.S. Senator from California (Class 3); 1968, 1974, 1980, 1986	Succeeded by Barbara Boxer
Vacant Title last held by Ted Stevens; John Rhodes	Response to the State of the Union address 1982; Served alongside: Robert Byrd, Al Gore, Gary Hart, Bennett Johnston, Ted Kennedy, Tip O'Neill, Don Riegle, Paul Sarbanes, Jim Sasser	Succeeded by Les AuCoin, Joe Biden, Bill Bradley, Robert Byrd, Tom Daschle, Bill Hefner, Barbara B. Kennelly, George Miller, Tip O'Neill, Paul Tsongas, Tim Wirth
Preceded by Robert Byrd	Senate Democratic Whip; 1977–1991	Succeeded by Wendell Ford
U.S. Senate
Preceded by Thomas Kuchel	United States Senator (Class 3) from California; 1969–1993; Served alongside: George Murphy, John V. Tunney, S. I. Hayakawa, Pete Wilson, John F. Seymour, Dianne Feinstein	Succeeded by Barbara Boxer
Preceded by Robert Byrd	Senate Majority Whip; 1977–1981	Succeeded by Ted Stevens
Preceded by Vance Hartke	Chair of the Senate Veterans Affairs Committee; 1977–1981	Succeeded by Alan K. Simpson
Preceded by Ted Stevens	Senate Minority Whip; 1981–1987	Succeeded by Alan K. Simpson
Preceded by Alan K. Simpson	Senate Majority Whip; 1987–1991	Succeeded by Wendell Ford
Preceded by Frank Murkowski	Chair of the Senate Veterans Affairs Committee; 1987–1993	Succeeded by Jay Rockefeller
