= Germain Bulcke =

American union leader (1902–1994)

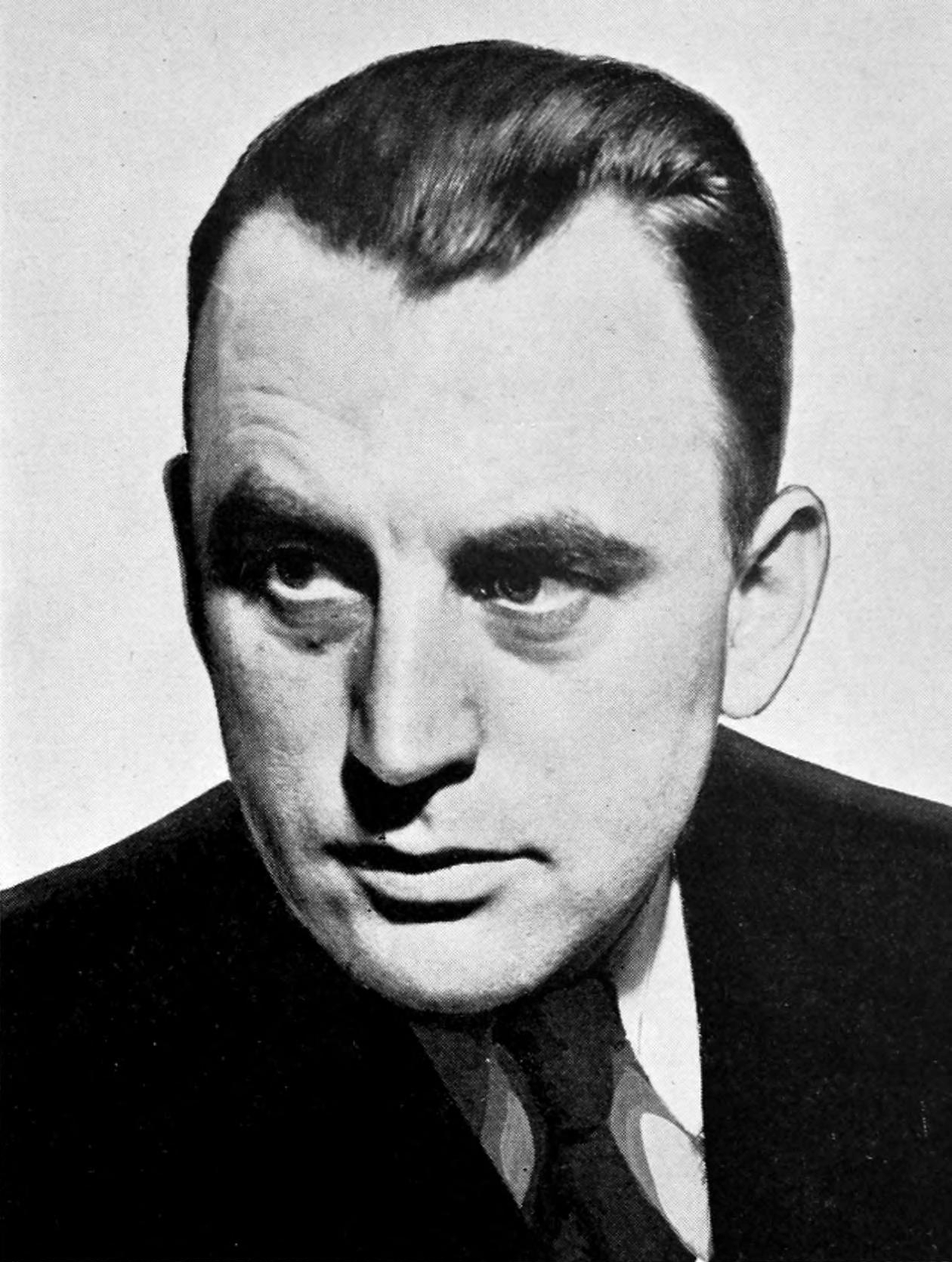
- Bulcke c. 1940

Second Vice President of the International Longshore and Warehouse Union
- In office June 14, 1947 – October 18, 1960
- President: Harry Bridges
- Preceded by: Mike Johnson
- Succeeded by: Office abolished

Member of the California Fish and Game Commission
- In office September 15, 1939 – January 15, 1944
- Appointed by: Culbert Olson
- Preceded by: E. C. Moore
- Succeeded by: Dom Civitello

Personal details
- Born: May 18, 1902 West Flanders, Belgium
- Died: April 6, 1994 (aged 91) Santa Rosa, California, U.S.
- Party: Democratic
- Other political affiliations: Progressive (1948)
- Spouse(s): Marie Delmotte (m. 1923) Helen Bruce (m. 1952)
- Children: Muriel; Ken
- Occupation: Labor leader

Germain Julien Bulcke (May 18, 1902 – April 6, 1994) was a Belgian-American longshore worker from San Francisco and leader in the International Longshore and Warehouse Union.

== Biography ==
Germain (Jerry) Bulcke was born in Belgium and moved to the United States as a child. He began working on the waterfront in the 1920s when the union was company controlled (known as the "blue book" union). During the 1934 West Coast Waterfront Strike, Bulcke served as a picket captain and witnessed the murders of longshore workers Nick Bordoise and Howard Sperry by police that became the impetus for the San Francisco General Strike. Bulcke also recounted that he carried another worker who had been wounded in the shootout to safety.

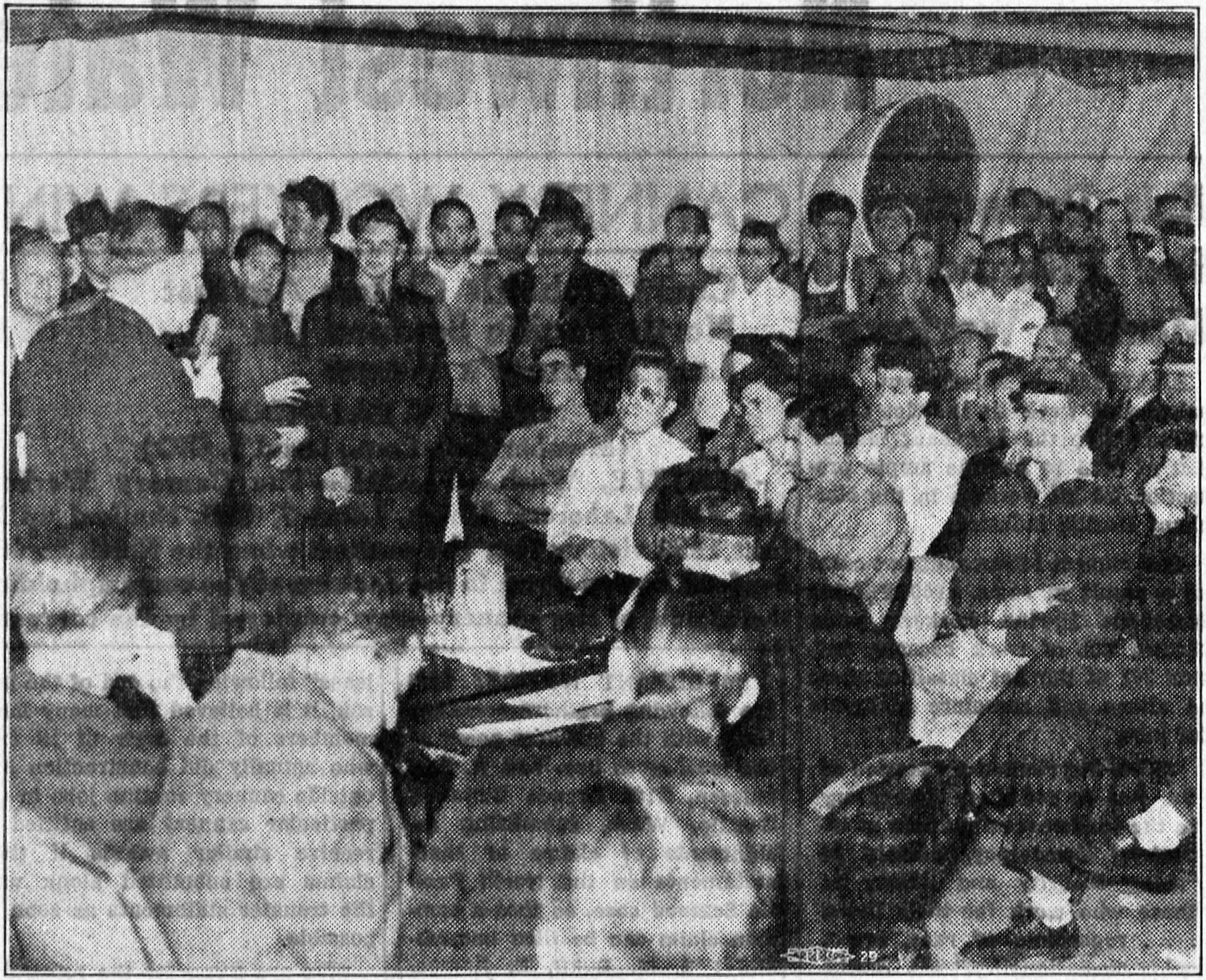
Bulcke (standing with microphone) speaks to National Maritime Union members on the importance of labor unity, 1939

After the 1934 strike, Bulcke rose to prominence in the union. Though never a member of the Communist Party, Bulcke aligned himself with Harry Bridges and the left wing of the union and was often involved in factional fights. In the 1930s, he protested the Reichstag Fire that led to the rise of Adolf Hitler in Germany and opposed US involvement in World War II until 1941. He was also active in the Harry Bridges Defense Committee during Bridges' deportation trials.

In 1939, Bulcke was appointed to the California Fish and Game Commission by governor Culbert Olson, serving until 1944. Olson had previously tried to appoint him to the San Francisco Harbor Commission, but the nomination was rejected by the State Senate. During the 1940 Democratic Party presidential primaries, Bulcke joined a left-wing slate pledged to lieutenant governor Ellis E. Patterson for president. They opposed incumbent Franklin D. Roosevelt on the grounds he was focusing too much on foreign affairs and not enough on domestic unemployment. The Patterson slate lost to Roosevelt's by a margin of fifteen to one. Bulcke later supported former vice president Henry A. Wallace in the 1948 presidential election, serving as chairman of the San Francisco County Progressive Central Committee and as a candidate for presidential elector.

In 1938, Bulcke was elected president of ILWU Local 10 (San Francisco Bay Area). He served as president for most of the 1940s, including during World War II. In 1947, he was elected international vice president (also known as second vice president), which he held until 1960. In 1960, Bulcke became the ILWU-PMA arbitrator for southern California. He held this position until his retirement in 1966.
