= Ralph C. Dills =

American politician in the state of California

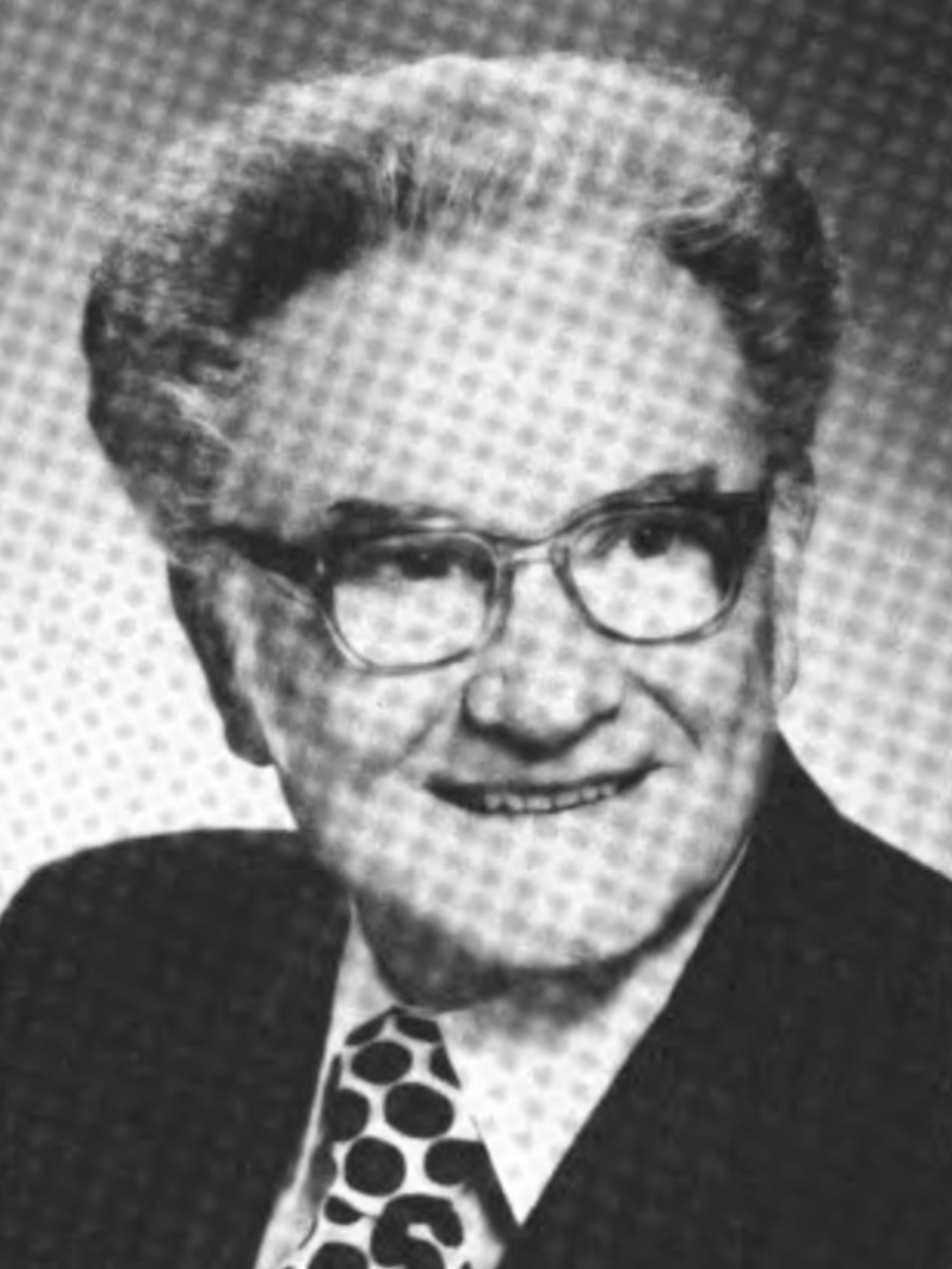
- Dills c. 1975

Member of the California Senate
- In office January 2, 1967 – November 30, 1998
- Preceded by: Howard Way
- Succeeded by: Debra Bowen
- Constituency: 32nd district (1967–1974); 28th district (1974–1982); 30th district (1982–1994); 28th district (1994–1998)

Judge of the Compton Municipal Court
- In office June 1, 1949 – January 2, 1967
- Appointed by: Los Angeles County Board of Supervisors
- Preceded by: Leonard Kaufman

Member of the California State Assembly from the 69th district
- In office January 2, 1939 – June 1, 1949
- Preceded by: Fred P. Glick
- Succeeded by: Carley V. Porter

Personal details
- Born: February 19, 1910 Rosston, Texas
- Died: May 23, 2002 (aged 92) Rocklin, California
- Party: Democratic
- Spouse(s): Elizabeth Ging Lee; Wendi Lewellen Lai
- Children: Gregory Lee Dills
- Relatives: Clayton A. Dills (brother)
- Education: University of California, Los Angeles; University of Southern California; McGeorge School of Law

Ralph Clinton Dills (February 19, 1910 – May 23, 2002) was an American politician in the state of California. A Democrat, he served in the California State Assembly from 1939 to 1949, and in the California State Senate from 1966 to 1998. He is the longest-serving member in the history of the California Legislature. He was born in Rosston, Texas and died in Rocklin, California.

During the 1940 Democratic Party presidential primaries, Dills joined a left-wing slate pledged to lieutenant governor Ellis E. Patterson for president. They opposed incumbent Franklin D. Roosevelt on the grounds he was focusing too much on foreign affairs and not enough on domestic unemployment. The Patterson slate lost to Roosevelt's by a margin of fifteen to one.
