= Donald L. Jackson =

American politician (1910–1981)

Don Jackson
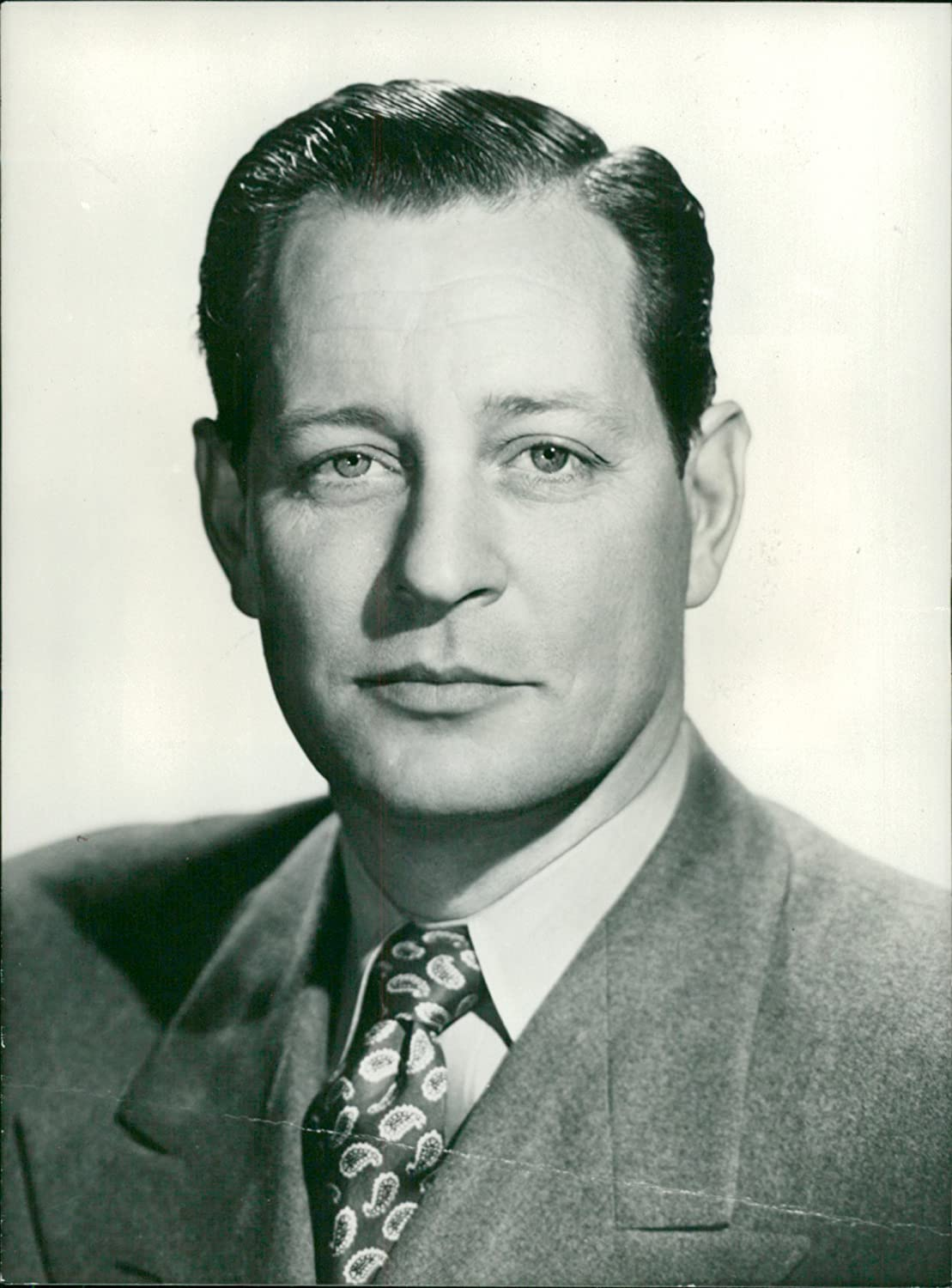

Member of the U.S. House of Representatives from California's 16th district
- In office January 3, 1947 – January 3, 1961
- Preceded by: Ellis E. Patterson
- Succeeded by: Alphonzo E. Bell Jr.

Personal details
- Born: Donald Lester Jackson; January 23, 1910 Ipswich, South Dakota, U.S.
- Died: May 27, 1981 (aged 71) Bethesda, Maryland, U.S.
- Resting place: Arlington National Cemetery
- Party: Republican

Donald Lester Jackson (January 23, 1910 – May 27, 1981) was an American military veteran, public relations executive and politician who served seven terms as a U.S. representative from California from 1947 to 1961.

== Early life and career ==
Born in Ipswich, Edmunds County, South Dakota, Jackson attended the public schools of South Dakota and California.

=== Military ===
He served as a private in the United States Marine Corps from 1927 to 1931 and again from 1940 until discharged as a colonel in 1945 with two years' combat service overseas during World War II.

=== Public relations ===
He engaged in public relations, and worked as a reporter and editor in Santa Monica, California, from 1938 to 1940. He served as director of publicity for the city of Santa Monica, in 1939 and 1940.

== Congress ==
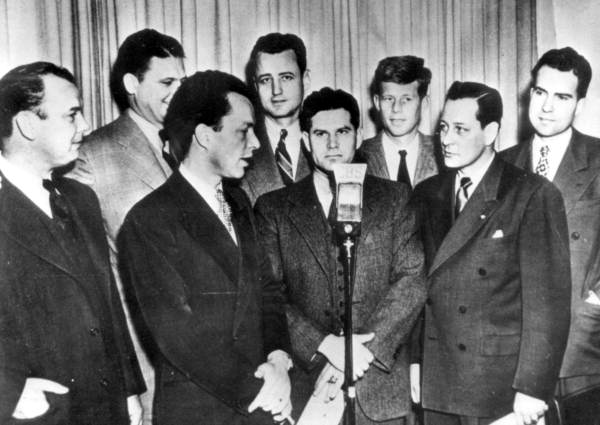
Jackson (on right, in front row, between John F. Kennedy and Richard Nixon) with the Congressional freshman class of 1947.

Jackson was elected as a Republican in 1946 to the Eightieth Congress. Although the County Republican Committee's candidate, he had to stave off former Republican Rep. Leland M. Ford in the primary. In the general election the Democratic Party was divided between the incumbent Ellis Patterson running as a write-in and the party nominee Harold Harby. Jackson was elected to the six succeeding Congresses and served from January 3, 1947, to January 3, 1961. Among other members of that historic 1946 congressional freshman class were future U.S. presidents John F. Kennedy and Richard Nixon.

Jackson served all seven terms on the Foreign Affairs Committee. He was a congressional adviser at the ninth conference of American States at Bogotá, Colombia in 1948. His one public bill enactment addressed civil service annuities, but four of his five successful resolutions commended efforts in Latin America. He was much more an initiator of successful private bills, seventeen being enacted.

=== House Un-American Activities Committee ===
His congressional service included the House Un-American Activities Committee, and a notable role in accusing Methodist Bishop G. Bromley Oxnam of engaging in communist activities. He was appointed to the committee to replace future president Richard Nixon, who had just been elected to the United States Senate.

=== Civil Rights votes ===
Jackson voted in favor of the Civil Rights Acts of 1957, but did not vote on the Civil Rights Act of 1960.

He was not a candidate for renomination in 1960. The seat remained Republican for another eight terms.

== Later career ==
He worked as a radio and television commentator from 1960 to 1968 and was appointed by President Nixon to the Interstate Commerce Commission in 1969. He resigned in 1972, before the end of his term.

== Death and burial ==
Jackson resided in Sosua, Dominican Republic, West Indies, until his death in Bethesda, Maryland, May 27, 1981. He was interred in Arlington National Cemetery.

== Electoral history ==
United States House of Representatives elections, 1946
Party	Candidate	Votes	%
Republican	Donald L. Jackson	78,264	53.9
Democratic	Harold Harby	45,951	31.7
Democratic	Ellis E. Patterson (write-in)	20,945	14.4
Total votes		145,160	100.0
Turnout			
Republican gain from Democratic			

United States House of Representatives elections, 1948
Party	Candidate	Votes	%
Republican	Donald L. Jackson (inc.)	121,198	57
Democratic	Ellis E. Patterson	91,268	43
Total votes		212,466	100
Turnout			
Republican hold			

United States House of Representatives elections, 1950
Party	Candidate	Votes	%
Republican	Donald L. Jackson (inc.)	115,970	59.3
Democratic	S. Mark Hogue	79,744	40.7
Total votes		195,714	100.0
Turnout			
Republican hold			

United States House of Representatives elections, 1952
Party	Candidate	Votes	%
Republican	Donald L. Jackson (inc.)	79,127	59.7
Democratic	S. Mark Hogue	53,337	40.3
Total votes		132,464	100.0
Turnout			
Republican hold			

United States House of Representatives elections, 1954
Party	Candidate	Votes	%
Republican	Donald L. Jackson (inc.)	63,124	60.8
Democratic	S. Mark Hogue	40,659	39.2
Total votes		103,783	100.0
Turnout			
Republican hold			

United States House of Representatives elections, 1956
Party	Candidate	Votes	%
Republican	Donald L. Jackson (inc.)	84,050	60.8
Democratic	G. Robert "Bob" Fleming	53,624	39.2
Total votes		137,674	100.0
Turnout			
Republican hold			

United States House of Representatives elections, 1958
Party	Candidate	Votes	%
Republican	Donald L. Jackson (inc.)	70,724	57.8
Democratic	Melvin Lennard	51,616	42.2
Total votes		122,340	100.0
Turnout			
Republican hold			

== See also ==
- List of members of the House Un-American Activities Committee

U.S. House of Representatives
Preceded by Ellis E. Patterson	Member of the U.S. House of Representatives from California's 16th congressional district 1947–1961	Succeeded by Alphonzo E. Bell Jr.
