= 1944 United States Senate election in California =

- November 7, 1944
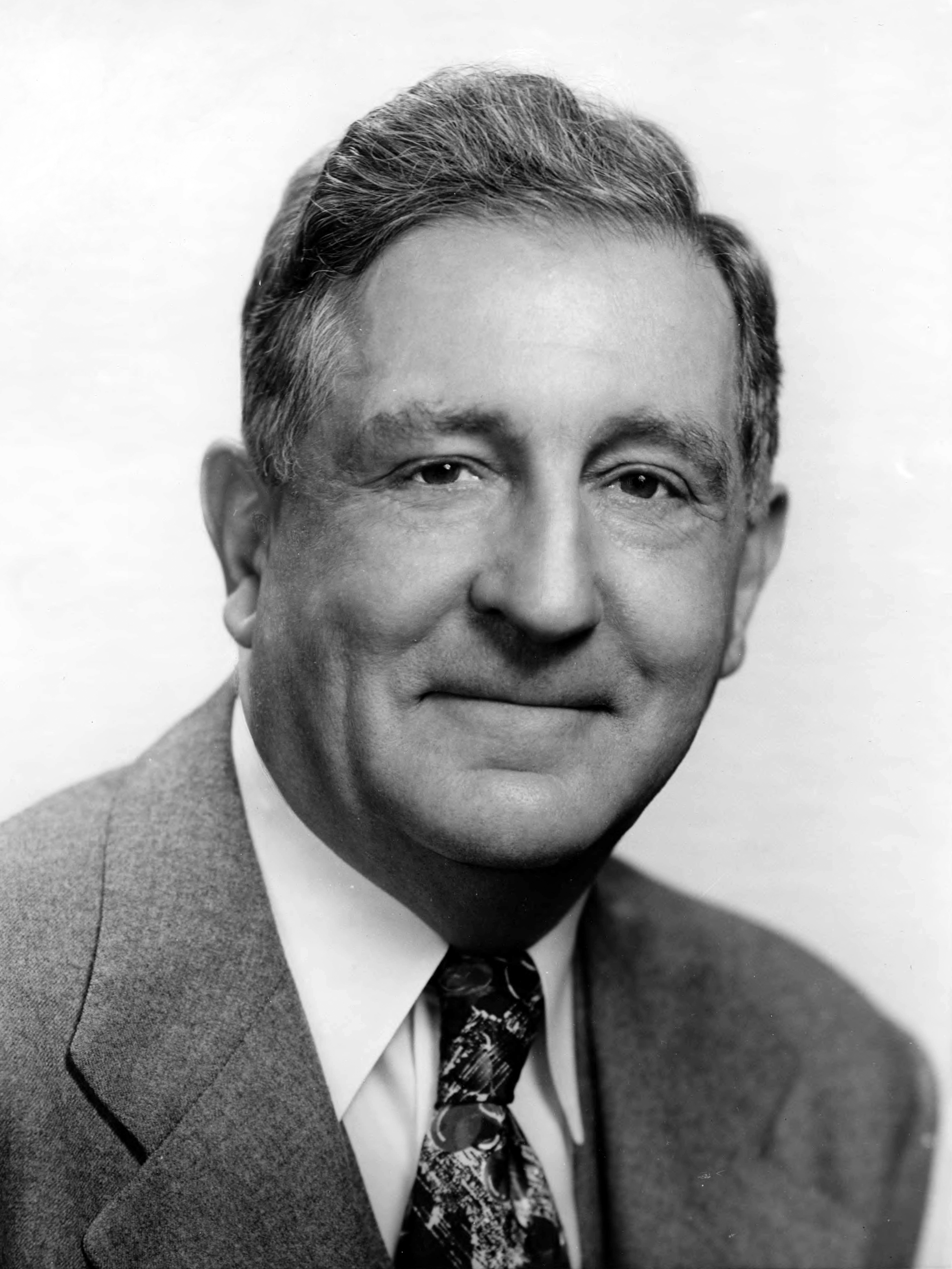

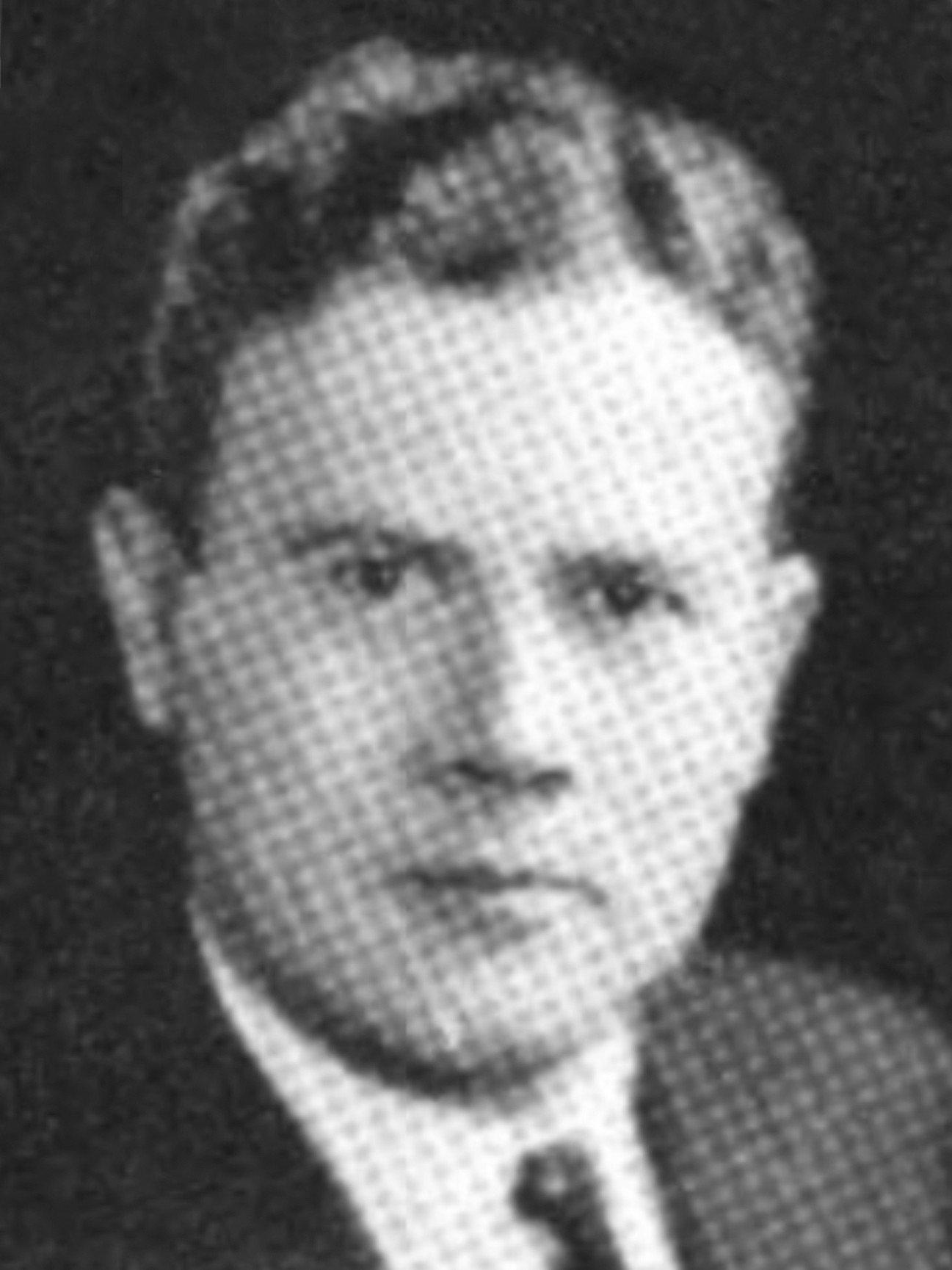
Nominee	Sheridan Downey	Frederick F. Houser
Party	Democratic	Republican
Alliance		Prohibition
Popular vote	1,728,155	1,576,553
Percentage	52.29%	47.71%
- Downey: 50–60% 60–70% Houser: 50–60% 60–70% 70–80% Tie: 50%
U.S. senator before election
Sheridan Downey
Democratic
Elected U.S. Senator
Sheridan Downey
Democratic

The 1944 United States Senate election in California was held on November 7, 1944.

Incumbent Democratic Senator Sheridan Downey was re-elected to a second term in office over Republican Lieutenant Governor Frederick F. Houser.

== Democratic primary ==
=== Candidates ===
- Justus F. Craemer
- Irene Dockweiler
- Sheridan Downey, incumbent Senator since 1939
- John J. Taheney
- Jack B. Tenney, singer and anti-communist State Senator from Banning

=== Results ===
1944 Democratic U.S. Senate primary results
Party	Candidate	Votes	%
Democratic	Sheridan Downey (inc.)	510,069	54.75%
Republican	Frederick F. Houser (cross-filing)	132,376	14.21%
Republican	William G. Bonelli (cross-filing)	60,080	6.45%
Republican	Philip Bancroft (cross-filing)	53,094	5.70%
Republican	Charles G. Johnson (cross-filing)	45,325	4.87%
Unknown (Note: It is unclear whether Tenney was a member of the Republican or Democratic Party at this point. He was elected as a Democratic candidate in 1938, but also won the Republican primary. At some point, he switched to the Republican Party.)	Jack B. Tenney	40,859	4.39%
Democratic	Irene M. Dockweiler	39,364	4.23%
Unknown	Justus F. Craemer	23,167	2.49%
Unknown	John J. Taheney	13,898	1.49%
Democratic	John S. Crowder	9,292	1.00%
Republican	Roland C. Casad (cross-filing)	4,106	0.44%
Total votes		931,630	100.00

== Republican primary ==
=== Candidates ===
- Philip Bancroft, 1938 Republican nominee for Senate
- William G. Bonelli, former member of the California Board of Equalization, former Los Angeles City Councilman, and State Representative
- Roland C. Casad, perennial candidate
- Justus F. Craemer
- John S. Crowder
- Frederick F. Houser, Lieutenant Governor of California
- Charles G. Johnson, California State Treasurer
- Alonzo J. Riggs
- John J. Taheney
- Jack B. Tenney, singer and anti-communist State Senator from Banning

=== Results ===
1944 Republican U.S. Senate primary
Party	Candidate	Votes	%
Republican	Frederick F. Houser	315,828	43.99%
Democratic	Sheridan Downey (inc.) (cross-filing)	119,412	16.63%
Republican	Philip Bancroft	106,463	14.83%
Republican	William G. Bonelli	54,078	7.53%
Republican	Charles G. Johnson	48,014	6.69%
Unknown	Justus F. Craemer	41,786	5.82%
Unknown	Jack B. Tenney	19,341	2.69%
Unknown	John J. Taheney	6,953	0.97%
Republican	Alonzo J. Riggs	3,446	0.48%
Republican	Roland C. Casad	2,629	0.37%
Total votes		717,950	100.00

== Prohibition primary ==
=== Candidates ===
- Sheridan Downey, incumbent Senator since 1939 (cross-filing)
- Frederick F. Houser, Lieutenant Governor of California (cross-filing)

=== Results ===
1944 Prohibition U.S. Senate primary
Party	Candidate	Votes	%
Republican	Frederick F. Houser	196	50.78%
Democratic	Sheridan Downey (inc.) (cross-filing)	190	49.22%
Total votes		386	100.00%

== General election ==
=== Results ===

General election results
Party	Candidate	Votes	%	±%
Democratic	Sheridan Downey (inc.)	1,728,155	52.29%	▼2.14
Republican	Frederick F. Houser	1,576,553	47.71%	▲3.04
Total votes		3,304,708	100.00%	

== See also ==
- 1944 United States Senate elections
