= Ellis E. Patterson =

American attorney and politician

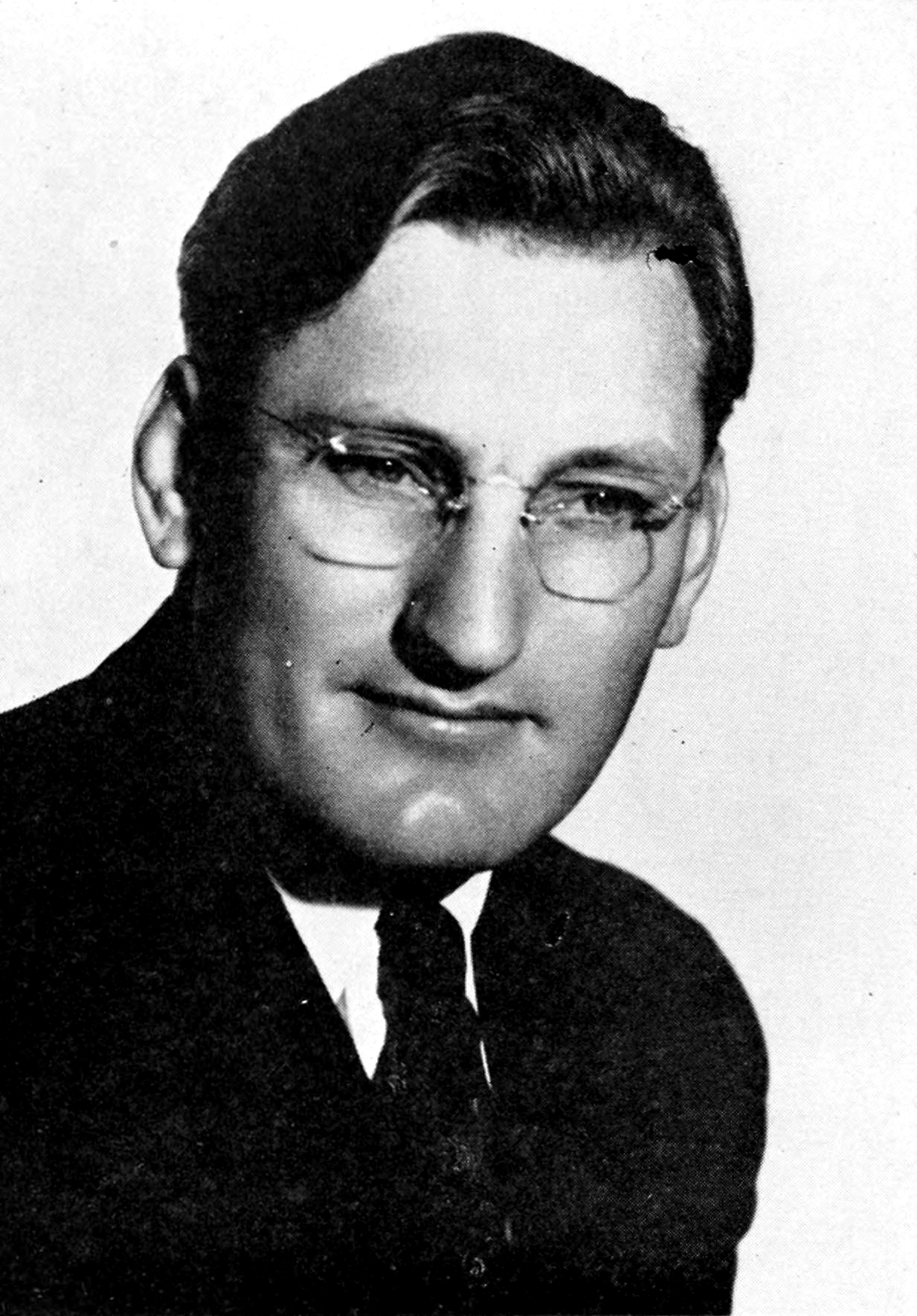
- Patterson c. 1938

33rd Lieutenant Governor of California
- In office January 2, 1939 – January 4, 1943
- Governor: Culbert Olson
- Preceded by: George J. Hatfield
- Succeeded by: Frederick F. Houser

Member of the U.S. House of Representatives from California's 16th district
- In office January 3, 1945 – January 3, 1947
- Preceded by: Will Rogers Jr.
- Succeeded by: Donald L. Jackson

Member of the California State Assembly from the 35th district
- In office January 2, 1933 – January 2, 1939
- Preceded by: Roy Bishop
- Succeeded by: Frederick Weybret

Personal details
- Born: Ellis Ellwood Patterson; November 28, 1897 Yuba City, California, U.S.
- Died: August 25, 1985 (aged 87) Los Angeles, California, U.S.
- Party: Republican (before 1937); Democratic (after 1937)
- Spouse(s): Helen Hjelte (m. 1928; died 1982) Mildred Faw (m. 1983)
- Children: Ellis Jr.; Jane; Robert
- Education: University of California, Berkeley; Stanford University; University of California
- Profession: Attorney, politician

Military service
- Allegiance: United States
- Branch/service: United States Navy; United States Merchant Marine
- Years of service: 1918
- Rank: Seaman
- Battles/wars: World War I

Ellis Ellwood Patterson (November 28, 1897 – August 25, 1985) was an American attorney and politician who served as the 33rd lieutenant governor of California from 1939 to 1943. He previously served in the California State Assembly from 1933 to 1939, and later in the U.S. House of Representatives from 1945 to 1947.

== Early life and career ==
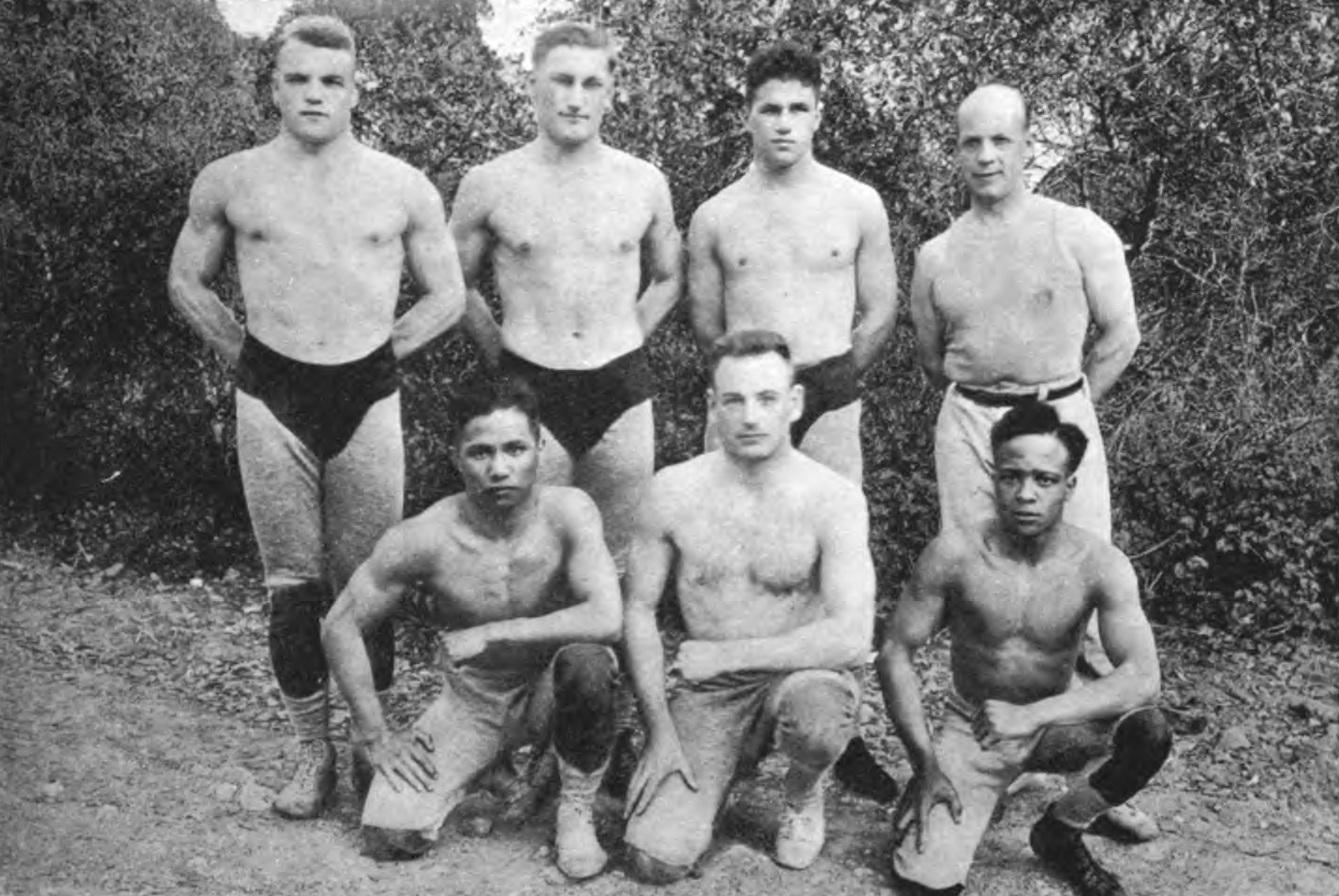
Patterson (standing, second from left) with other members of the UC Berkeley wrestling team, 1921

Born in Yuba City, California, Patterson attended public schools and graduated from the University of California, Berkeley with an A.B. in 1921. He served as a seaman in the United States Navy during World War I and later in the United States Merchant Marine. He taught school in Colusa County, California from 1922 to 1924.

From 1923 to 1932, Patterson served as the district superintendent of schools for South Monterey County, California. He also studied law at Stanford University and the University of California from 1931 to 1936. He was admitted to the bar in 1937 and commenced law practice in Sacramento and Los Angeles.

== Political career ==
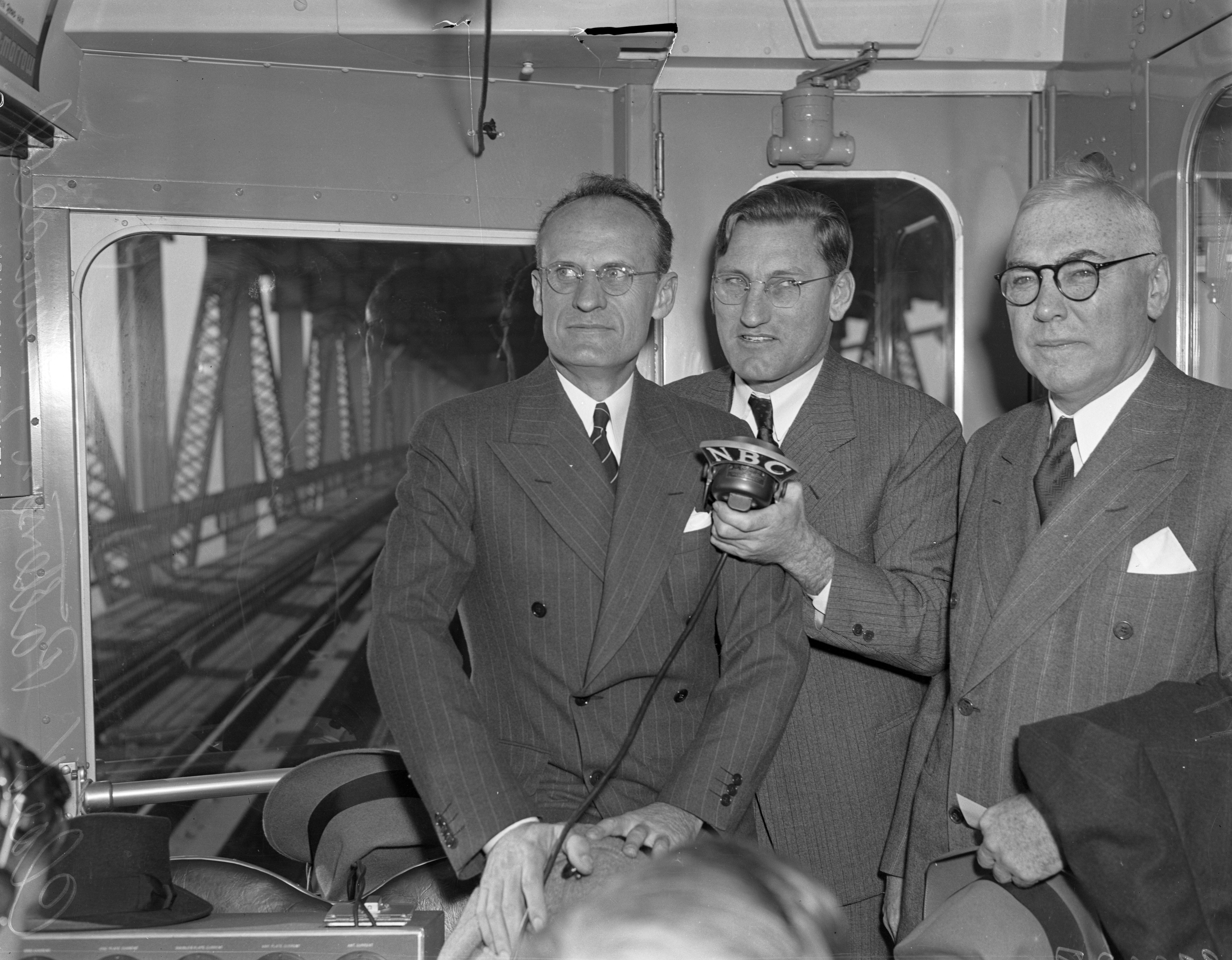
Public Works Director Frank W. Clark (left), Lieutenant Governor Ellis E. Patterson (center), and State Highway Engineer Charles H. Purcell take the first train over the Bay Bridge, January 14, 1939

Patterson served as a member of the California State Assembly for the 35th district from 1931 to 1939. In 1936, after being defeated in the primaries in his second re-election bid, Patterson waged a write-in campaign and won the election. Originally elected as a Republican, Patterson switched his party affiliation to Democratic after becoming enamored with President Franklin D. Roosevelt's New Deal.

After gaining publicity for his write-in Assembly campaign, Patterson was elected Lieutenant Governor of California in 1938, serving from 1939 to 1943. He was defeated for reelection in 1942. In 1940, he was an unsuccessful candidate for United States Senate, losing the Democratic primary to incumbent Republican Hiram Johnson.

During the 1940 Democratic Party presidential primaries in California, Patterson headed a slate pledged to himself for president. They opposed incumbent Franklin D. Roosevelt on the grounds he was focusing too much on foreign affairs and not enough on domestic unemployment. Among the Patterson slate's candidates were State Assemblymen Ralph C. Dills and Paul A. Richie, journalists Carey McWilliams and Frank Scully, labor leaders Germain Bulcke and Herbert Sorrell, Los Angeles County SRA director Sam Houston Allen, and Los Angeles Board of Education member Fay E. Allen. The Patterson slate lost to Roosevelt's by a margin of fifteen to one.

=== Congress ===
Patterson was elected as a Democrat to the 79th United States Congress in 1944. In 1946, he did not seek reelection for his House seat, but instead ran once again unsuccessfully for U.S. Senate, losing the Democratic primary to his predecessor in the House, Will Rogers Jr.

Patterson was an unsuccessful candidate for election to the 81st United States Congress in 1948, running as a Democratic supporter of Progressive Henry A. Wallace for president. He won the nomination of the Independent Progressive Party through California's cross-filing system, but lost the general election to incumbent Republican Donald L. Jackson. In 1949, Patterson ran for mayor of Los Angeles, coming in third place with 14% of the vote. Afterward, he resumed the practice of law.

== Personal life and death ==
Patterson married Helen Hjelte in 1928, with whom he had three children. They were married until her death in 1982, after which he took a second wife, Mildred.

Patterson was active in the American Legion, serving as commander of the Colusa County post.

Patterson resided in Los Angeles from 1938 until he died of cancer there on August 25, 1985.

== Electoral results ==
United States House of Representatives elections, 1944
Party	Candidate	Votes	%
Democratic	Ellis E. Patterson	105,835	54.1
Republican	Jesse Randolph Kellems	89,700	45.9
Total votes		195,535	100.0
Turnout			
Democratic hold			

United States House of Representatives elections, 1946
Party	Candidate	Votes	%
Republican	Donald L. Jackson	78,264	53.9
Democratic	Harold Harby	45,951	31.7
Democratic	Ellis E. Patterson (inc.) (write-in)	20,945	14.4
Total votes		145,160	100.0
Turnout			
Republican gain from Democratic			

United States House of Representatives elections, 1948
Party	Candidate	Votes	%
Republican	Donald L. Jackson (inc.)	121,198	57
Democratic	Ellis E. Patterson	91,268	43
Total votes		212,466	100
Turnout			
Republican hold			

U.S. House of Representatives
Preceded by Will Rogers, Jr.	Member of the U.S. House of Representatives from California's 16th congressional district January 3, 1945 – January 3, 1947	Succeeded by Donald L. Jackson
