= 1942 California lieutenant gubernatorial election =

- November 3, 1942
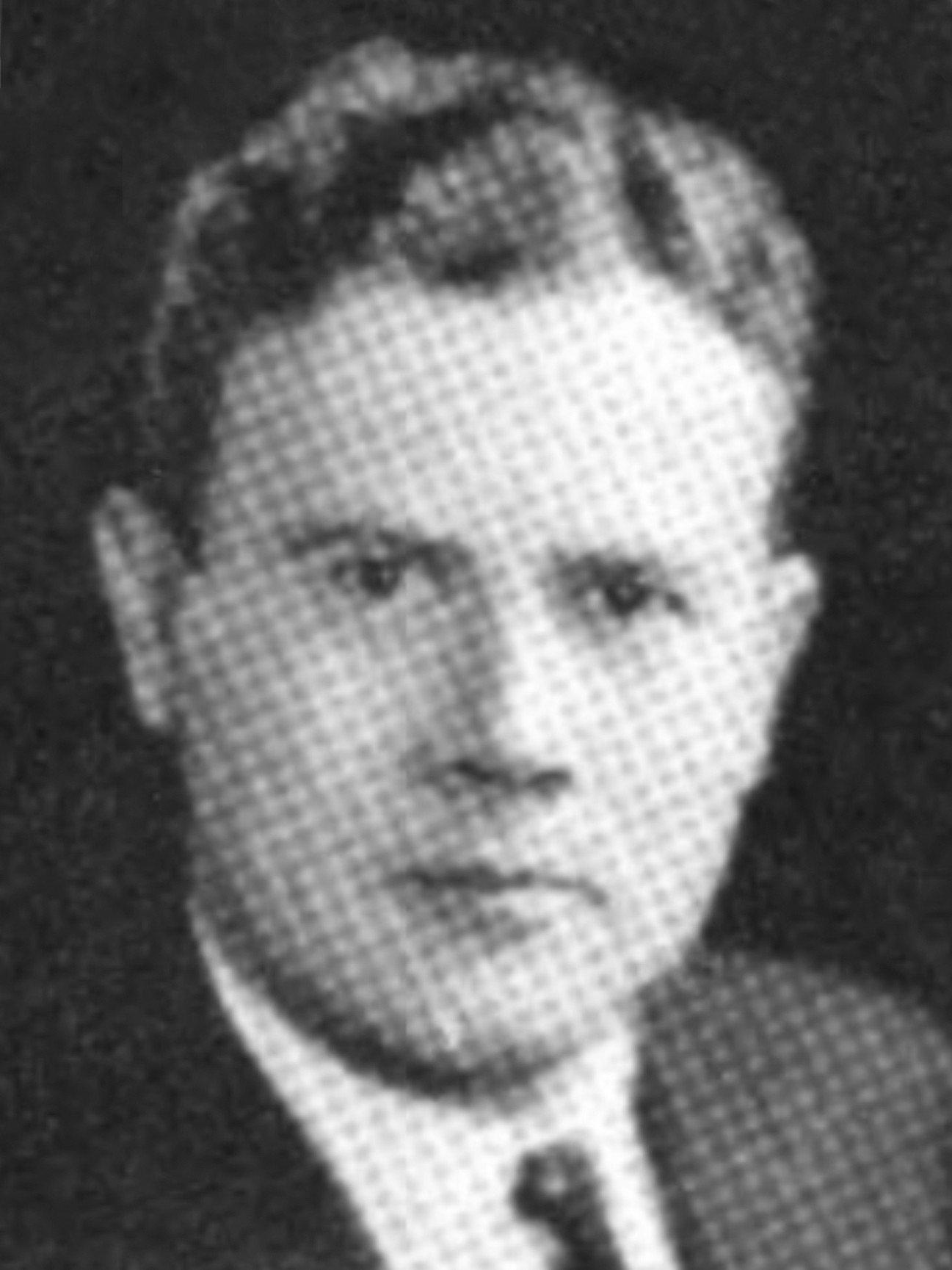

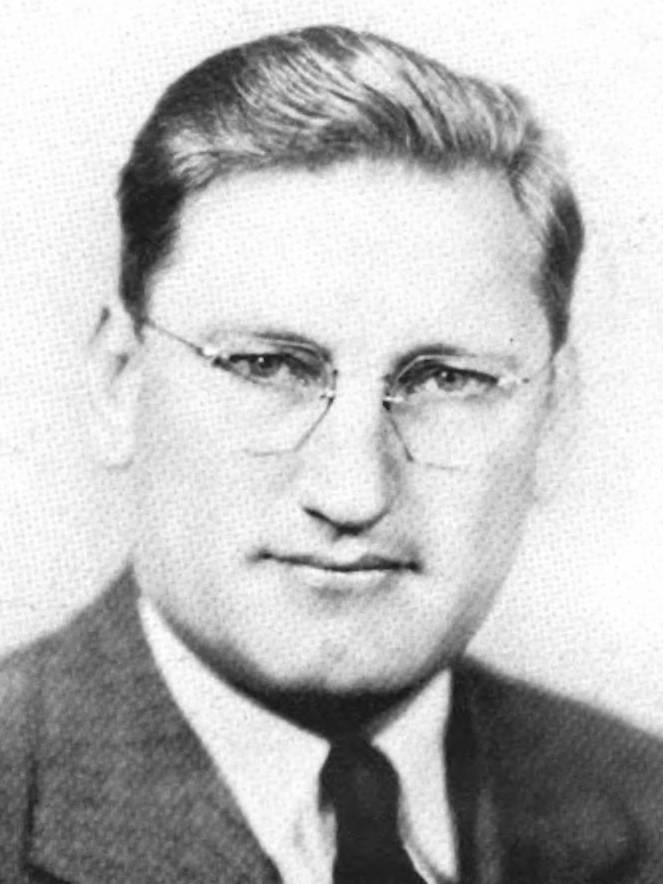
Nominee	Frederick F. Houser	Ellis E. Patterson
Party	Republican	Democratic
Popular vote	1,077,408	1,064,660
Percentage	50.30%	49.70%
- County results Houser: 50–60% 60–70% Patterson: 50–60% 60–70%
Lieutenant Governor before election
Ellis E. Patterson
Republican
Elected Lieutenant Governor
Frederick F. Houser
Republican

The 1942 California lieutenant gubernatorial election was held on November 3, 1942. Republican Assemblyman Frederick F. Houser narrowly defeated incumbent Democratic Lieutenant Governor Ellis E. Patterson with 50.30% of the vote.

== General election ==
=== Candidates ===
- Frederick F. Houser, Republican
- Ellis E. Patterson, Democratic

=== Results ===
1942 California lieutenant gubernatorial election
Party	Candidate	Votes	%	±%
Republican	Frederick F. Houser	1,077,408	50.30%	
Democratic	Ellis E. Patterson (incumbent)	1,064,660	49.70%	
Scattering		59	0.00%	
Majority		2,142,127		
Turnout				
Republican gain from Democratic		Swing		
