= Frederick F. Houser =

American politician (1904–1989)

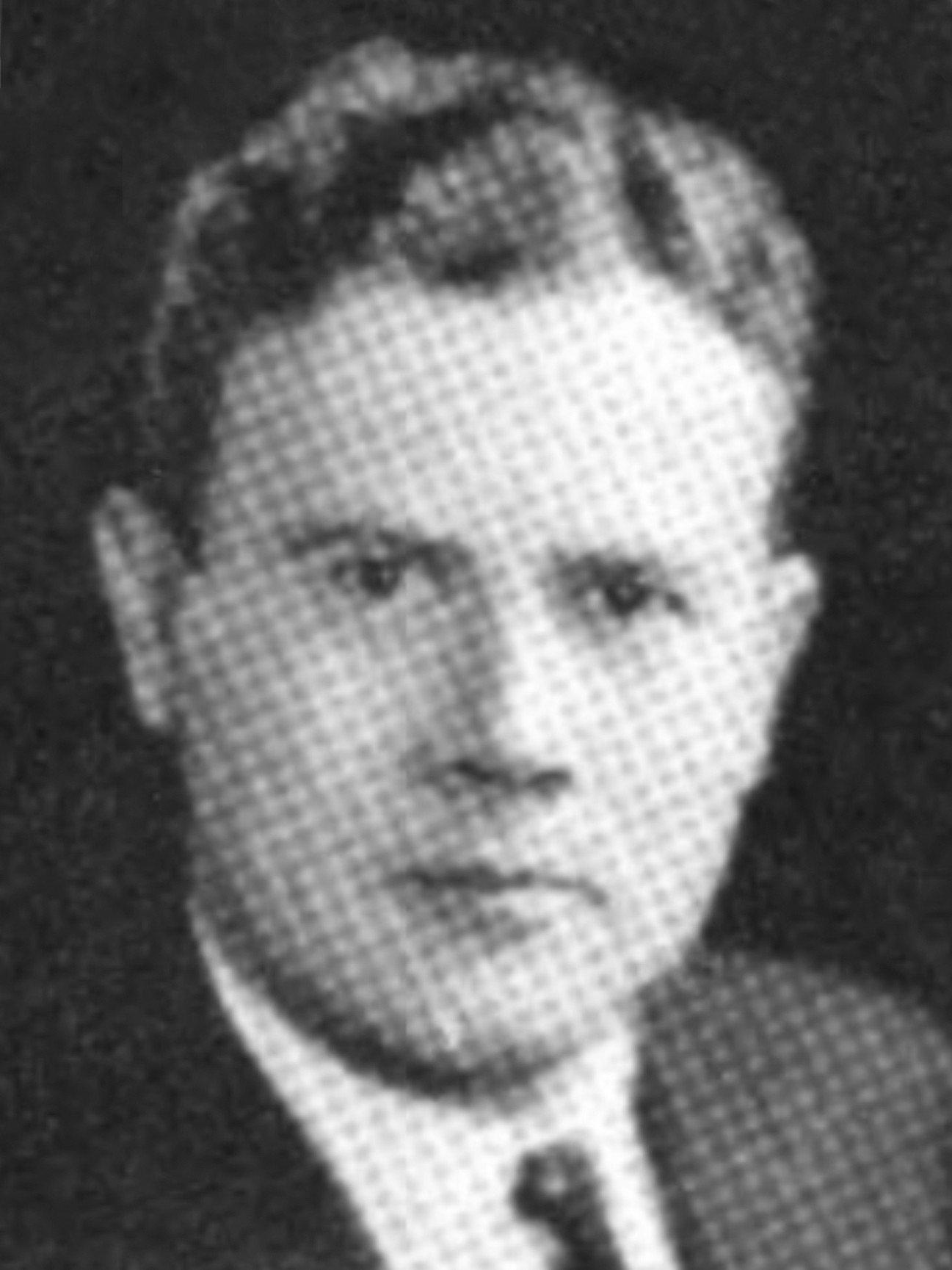
- Houser in 1942

34th Lieutenant Governor of California
- In office January 4, 1943 – January 6, 1947
- Governor: Earl Warren
- Preceded by: Ellis E. Patterson
- Succeeded by: Goodie Knight

Member of the California State Assembly from the 53rd district
- In office January 2, 1939 – January 4, 1943
- Preceded by: E. Valsaine Latham
- Succeeded by: Lothrop Smith
- In office January 5, 1931 – January 2, 1933
- Preceded by: Chris N. Jespersen
- Succeeded by: E. Valsaine Latham

Personal details
- Born: November 14, 1904 Los Angeles, California, US
- Died: December 25, 1989 (aged 85) Laguna Beach, California, US
- Party: Republican
- Spouse: Dorothy Eleanor Bodinus (m. 1925)
- Relations: Frederick W. Houser (father)
- Education: University of California at Los Angeles; Harvard Law School
- Profession: Attorney, judge

Frederick Francis Houser (November 14, 1904 – December 25, 1989) was an American politician. A member of the Republican Party, he served as the 34th lieutenant governor of California under Governor Earl Warren from 1943 to 1947.

== Early years ==
Houser was born in Los Angeles, California on November 14, 1904, the son of California Court of Appeals Justice Frederick W. Houser and Sara Wilde, both of whom were active participants in the early years of what is now the USC Gould School of Law. Houser was raised in Alhambra, California, and graduated from the University of Southern California at Los Angeles in 1926. He taught government at Harvard University while attending Harvard Law School from 1926 to 1929, and he graduated with an LL.B. Houser was admitted to the bar in 1930, and practiced law until 1946. Houser was UCLA's student body president from 1925 to 1926, served as president of the UCLA alumni association 1933–1935, and won the school's Edward A. Dickson Alumnus of the Year Award in 1948.

== Career ==
From 1926 to 1940, Houser was a member of the Los Angeles County Republican Central Committee. From 1930 to 1940, he served on the California Republican State Central Committee. He served in the California State Assembly from 1931 to 1933 and again from 1939 to 1943. Houser was an unsuccessful Republican candidate for the United States House of Representatives in 1932, 1934, and 1936.

In 1942, Houser was elected lieutenant governor. He served until 1947, and was an unsuccessful candidate for the United States Senate in 1944, losing narrowly to incumbent Sheridan Downey.

== Judge ==
After leaving the lieutenant governor's office, Houser was appointed as a judge of the California Superior Court. He served from 1947 until retiring in 1966.

== Retirement and death ==
In retirement, Houser was a resident of Laguna Beach, California. He died in Laguna Beach on December 25, 1989.

== Family ==
In 1925, Houser married Dorothy Eleanor Bodinus, a fellow UCLA student. She died in 1996, and they had no children.

== Sources ==
=== Internet ===
- "Biography, Frederick Francis Houser". Finding Aid for the Frederick Francis Houser Papers. Sacramento, CA: Online Archives of California. 1975.
- "Electoral History, Frederick F. Houser". JoinCalifornia. Sacramento, CA: Alex Vassar & Shane Meyers. 2005.
- "California US Senate Race, 1944". ourcampaigns.com. Our Campaigns.com. 2017.

=== Newspapers ===
- "F. F. Houser, 85; Superior Court Judge, Lt. Governor, Legislator". Los Angeles Times. Los Angeles, CA. December 29, 1989.
- "Obituary, Mrs. Frederick F. Houser". Los Angeles Times. Los Angeles, CA. December 21, 1996 – via Newspapers.com.

Party political offices
Preceded by Philip Bancroft	Republican nominee for U.S. Senator from California (Class 3); 1944	Succeeded by Richard Nixon
Political offices
Preceded by Ellis E. Patterson	Lieutenant Governor of California; 1943-1947	Succeeded by Goodwin Knight
