= Stan Monteith =

American radio host

- Born: Stanley Kimball Monteith; February 17, 1929; Oakland, California
- Died: September 30, 2014 (aged 85)
- Occupations: Radio host, author
- Title: Doctor Stanley Monteith

Stanley Kimball Monteith (February 17, 1929 – September 29, 2014) was a radio host and author and a retired orthopedic surgeon, popularly known as Doctor Stan. He hosted a daily radio show called Radio Liberty.

== History ==
Monteith was the author of several books and had published a number of videos and other recorded media. His radio talk show was heard in over 50 radio stations across the United States and overseas.

Many of the issues that Monteith addressed had to do with globalization and the New World Order. He was also a highly active opponent of water fluoridation.

In 1988, Monteith ran for Congress as a Republican in California's 16th congressional district, challenging incumbent Leon Panetta. Panetta was re-elected with nearly 79 per California's 16th congressional district of the vote. Prior to his run for Congress, Monteith was a longtime member of the John Birch Society, and had once headed the group's Santa Cruz County chapter. He was later a member of the Pat Robertson's Christian Coalition and the Coalition on Revival.

For years, Dr. Stan opened his radio program, Radio Liberty, with this quote... —¨Bringing you the Story behind the Story, the News behind the News. Hoping to convince you, that reality is usually scoffed at, and illusion is usually king, but in the battle for the survival of Christian civilization it will be reality and not illusion or delusion that will determine what the future will bring.¨—

== Publications ==
Books

- Brotherhood of Darkness. Oklahoma City, OK: Hearthstone Publishing, 2000. ISBN 1575580632 / ISBN 978-1575580630.
- Aids, the Unnecessary Epidemic: America Under Siege. Sevierville, TN: Covenant House Books, 1991. ISBN 0925591173 / ISBN 978-0925591173.
- Hidden Agenda: The Fluoride Deception—Training Manual for Parents, Physicians, and Dentists (with DVD). Radio Liberty, 2004.
- IRAQ: The Untold Story (With DVD). Radio Liberty, 2004.

Pamphlets

- The Population Control Agenda.

Audio recordings

- Radio Liberty: The Wisdom of Malachi Martin? Radio Liberty, 1997.
- O. J. Simpson: Innocent or Guilty? with Donald Freed, Steven Wurth, Joseph Boscoe, and Steven Singular.

== Filmography ==
Documentary Interviews

- Secret Mysteries of America's Beginnings, Vol. 1: The New Atlantis (2006)
- One Nation Under Siege (2006)
- Rape of the Soul (2006)
- Secret Mysteries of America's Beginnings, Vol. 2: Riddles in Stone: The Secret Architecture of Washington D.C. (2007)
- Secret Mysteries of America's Beginnings, Vol. 3: Eye of the Phoenix: Secrets of the Dollar Bill (2009)
- 12 Biggest Lies (2010)
- The Truth Is Out There (2011)
