= California's 16th congressional district =

U.S. House district for California

Coordinates: 37°06′34″N 120°31′18″W

- Interactive map of district boundaries
- Representative: Sam Liccardo; D–San Jose
- Population (2025): 737,129
- Median household income: $176,761
- Ethnicity: 43.5% White; 29.4% Asian; 19.1% Hispanic; 5.2% Two or more races; 1.9% Black; 1.0% other
- Cook PVI: D+26

California's 16th congressional district is a congressional district in the U.S. state of California. It includes portions of Santa Clara and San Mateo counties, extending from the southwestern San Francisco Bay Area through the Santa Cruz Mountains to the Pacific coast. The district is currently represented by Democrat Sam Liccardo. As currently drawn, it is the wealthiest district in the nation.

On December 20, 2021, the state redistricting commission unanimously approved a new map of congressional districts, under which the new district overlaps largely with the old 18th district. The primary election of June 2022 was the first to feature the new districts; however, sitting representatives reflected the old district boundaries until the general election in November 2022.

Prior to the 2020s redistricting, the district included Merced County, most of Madera County, and part of Fresno County. During this time, cities in the district included Los Banos, Madera, Merced, and most of Fresno. Cities in the new 16th district include Pacifica, Half Moon Bay, Atherton, Palo Alto, Saratoga, Campbell, Woodside, and Los Gatos, along with the south-central and southwestern parts of San Jose. Most of the old 16th district is now part of the 13th and 21st districts.

== Recent election results from statewide races ==
=== 2023–2027 boundaries ===
| Year | Office | Results |
|---|---|---|
| 2008 | President | Obama 71% - 28% |
| 2010 | Governor | Brown 62% - 35% |
| 2010 | Lt. Governor | Newsom 61% - 32% |
| 2010 | Secretary of State | Bowen 62% - 30% |
| 2010 | Attorney General | Harris 55% - 37% |
| 2010 | Treasurer | Lockyer 65% - 29% |
| 2010 | Controller | Chiang 62% - 30% |
| 2012 | President | Obama 71% - 29% |
| 2014 | Governor | Brown 73% - 27% |
| 2016 | President | Clinton 74% - 20% |
| 2018 | Governor | Newsom 73% - 27% |
| 2018 | Attorney General | Becerra 74% - 26% |
| 2020 | President | Biden 75% - 22% |
| 2022 | Senate (Reg.) | Padilla 74% - 26% |
| 2022 | Governor | Newsom 73% - 27% |
| 2022 | Lt. Governor | Kounalakis 73% - 27% |
| 2022 | Secretary of State | Weber 73% - 27% |
| 2022 | Attorney General | Bonta 71% - 29% |
| 2022 | Treasurer | Ma 71% - 29% |
| 2022 | Controller | Cohen 65% - 35% |
| 2024 | President | Harris 72% - 24% |
| 2024 | Senate (Reg.) | Schiff 72% - 28% |

=== 2027–2033 boundaries ===
| Year | Office | Results |
|---|---|---|
| 2008 | President | Obama 71% - 28% |
| 2010 | Governor | Brown 62% - 35% |
| 2010 | Lt. Governor | Newsom 61% - 32% |
| 2010 | Secretary of State | Bowen 62% - 30% |
| 2010 | Attorney General | Harris 55% - 37% |
| 2010 | Treasurer | Lockyer 65% - 29% |
| 2010 | Controller | Chiang 62% - 30% |
| 2012 | President | Obama 71% - 29% |
| 2014 | Governor | Brown 73% - 27% |
| 2016 | President | Clinton 74% - 20% |
| 2018 | Governor | Newsom 73% - 27% |
| 2018 | Attorney General | Becerra 74% - 26% |
| 2020 | President | Biden 75% - 22% |
| 2022 | Senate (Reg.) | Padilla 74% - 26% |
| 2022 | Governor | Newsom 73% - 27% |
| 2022 | Lt. Governor | Kounalakis 73% - 27% |
| 2022 | Secretary of State | Weber 73% - 27% |
| 2022 | Attorney General | Bonta 71% - 29% |
| 2022 | Treasurer | Ma 71% - 29% |
| 2022 | Controller | Cohen 65% - 35% |
| 2024 | President | Harris 72% - 24% |
| 2024 | Senate (Reg.) | Schiff 72% - 28% |

== Composition ==
| FIPS County Code | County | Seat | Population |
|---|---|---|---|
| 81 | San Mateo | Redwood City | 726,353 |
| 85 | Santa Clara | San Jose | 1,877,592 |

Under the 2020 redistricting, California's 16th congressional district is located in the San Francisco Bay Area. It encompassing the west coast and interior of San Mateo County, and the western border of Santa Clara County. The area in San Mateo County includes the southern sections of the city of Menlo Park and town of Atherton; the cities of Pacifica, Half Moon Bay, and Portola Valley; the town of Woodside; and the census-designated places Montara, Moss Beach, El Granada, Pescadero, Loma Mar, La Honda, and Ladera. The area in Santa Clara County includes the west central section of the city of San Jose; the cities of Campbell, Saratoga, Los Altos, Mountain View, Palo Alto, and Monte Sereno; the towns of Los Altos Hills and Los Gatos; and the census-designated places Loyola, Lexington Hills, Cambrian Park, Fruitdale, and Stanford, which includes Stanford University.

San Mateo County is split between this district and the 15th district. They are partitioned by the San Francisquito Creek, Menalto Ave, Willow Rd, S Perimeter Rd, W Perimeter Rd, Bay Rd, Marsh Rd, Middlefield Rd, Highway 82, Highway 84, Alameda de las Pulgas, Woodhill Dr, Farm Hill Blvd, The Loop Rd, Jefferson Ave, Summit Way, California Way, Junipero Serra Freeway, and Highway 35.

Santa Clara County is split between this district, the 17th district, the 18th district, and the 19th district. The 16th and 19th are partitioned by Old Santa Cruz Highway, Aldercroft Hts Rd, Weaver Rd, Soda Springs Rd, Love Harris Rd, Pheasant Creek, Guadalupe Creek, Guadalupe Mines Rd, Oak Canyon Dr, Coleman Rd, Meridian Ave, Highway G8, Guadalupe River, W Capitol Expressway, Senter Rd, Sylvandale Ave, Yerba Buena Rd, Silver Creek Rd, and E Capitol Expressway. The 16th and 18th are partitioned by Annona Ave Santiago Ave, Tully Rd, Highway 101, S King Rd, Valley Palms Apts, Story Rd, Senter Rd, E Alma Ave, S 7th St, Monterey Rd, Barnard Ave, Highway G8, Highway 87, W Alma Ave, Belmont Way, Belmont Ave, Minnesota Ave, Prevost St, Atlanta Ave, Fuller Ave, Riverside Dr, Coe Ave, Lincoln Ave, Paula St, Highway 280, and Highway 880. The 16th and 17th are partitioned by Stevens Creek Blvd, Santana Row, Olsen Dr, S Winchester Blvd, Williams Rd, Eden Ave, Lexington Dr, Valley Forge Way, Gleason Ave, Moreland Way, Payne Ave, Saratoga Ave, Doyle Rd, Highway G2, Royal Ann Dr, Wisteria Way, Rainbow Dr, Highway 85, S De Anza Blvd, Prospect Rd, Fremont Older Open Space, Permanente Creek, Highway 280, N Foothill Blvd, Homestead Rd, Stevens Creek, W EL Camino Real, Magritte Way, Highway G6, Highway 101, and Enterprise Way.

=== Cities and CDPs with 10,000 or more people ===
- San Jose – 977,233
- Mountain View – 81,059
- Palo Alto – 68,572
- Campbell – 43,959
- Pacifica – 38,640
- Menlo Park – 33,780
- Los Gatos – 33,529
- Los Altos – 31,625
- Saratoga – 31,051
- Stanford – 21,150
- Half Moon Bay – 11,795

=== 2,500 – 10,000 people ===
- Los Altos Hills – 8,489
- Atherton – 7,188
- El Granada – 5,481
- Woodside – 5,309
- Portola Valley – 4,456
- Cambrian Park – 3,719
- Loyola – 3,491
- Monte Sereno – 3,479
- Moss Beach – 3,214
- Montara – 2,833

== List of members representing the district ==
| Representative | Party | Dates | Cong ress(es) | Electoral history | Counties |
|---|---|---|---|---|---|
District created March 4, 1933
| John F. Dockweiler (Los Angeles) | Democratic | March 4, 1933 – January 3, 1939 | 73rd 74th 75th | Elected in 1932. Re-elected in 1934. Re-elected in 1936. Lost re-election as a write-in candidate after running for governor. | [data missing] |
| Leland M. Ford (Santa Monica) | Republican | January 3, 1939 – January 3, 1943 | 76th 77th | Elected in 1938. Re-elected in 1940. Lost re-election. | [data missing] |
| Will Rogers Jr. (Culver City) | Democratic | January 3, 1943 – May 23, 1944 | 78th | Elected in 1942. Resigned to return to active duty in the Army. | [data missing] |
| Vacant | | May 23, 1944 – January 3, 1945 | 78th | | |
| Ellis E. Patterson (Los Angeles) | Democratic | January 3, 1945 – January 3, 1947 | 79th | Elected in 1944. Lost renomination. | [data missing] |
| Donald L. Jackson (Los Angeles) | Republican | January 3, 1947 – January 3, 1961 | 80th 81st 82nd 83rd 84th 85th 86th | Elected in 1946. Re-elected in 1948. Re-elected in 1950. Re-elected in 1952. Re-elected in 1954. Re-elected in 1956. Re-elected in 1958. Retired. | [data missing] |
| Alphonzo E. Bell Jr. (Santa Monica) | Republican | January 3, 1961 – January 3, 1963 | 87th | Elected in 1960. Redistricted to the 28th district. | [data missing] |
| B. F. Sisk (Fresno) | Democratic | January 3, 1963 – January 3, 1975 | 88th 89th 90th 91st 92nd 93rd | Redistricted from the 12th district and re-elected in 1962. Re-elected in 1964. Re-elected in 1966. Re-elected in 1968. Re-elected in 1970. Re-elected in 1972. Redistricted to the 15th district. | Fresno, Madera, Merced |
| B. F. Sisk (Fresno) | Democratic | January 3, 1963 – January 3, 1975 | 88th 89th 90th 91st 92nd 93rd | Redistricted from the 12th district and re-elected in 1962. Re-elected in 1964. Re-elected in 1966. Re-elected in 1968. Re-elected in 1970. Re-elected in 1972. Redistricted to the 15th district. | Fresno, Merced |
| Burt Talcott (Salinas) | Republican | January 3, 1975 – January 3, 1977 | 94th | Redistricted from the 12th district and re-elected in 1974. Lost re-election. | Western Monterey, San Benito, northern San Luis Obispo, Santa Cruz |
| Leon Panetta (Carmel Valley) | Democratic | January 3, 1977 – January 3, 1993 | 95th 96th 97th 98th 99th 100th 101st 102nd | Elected in 1976. Re-elected in 1978. Re-elected in 1980. Re-elected in 1982. Re-elected in 1984. Re-elected in 1986. Re-elected in 1988. Re-elected in 1990. Redistricted to the 17th district | Western Monterey, San Benito, northern San Luis Obispo, Santa Cruz |
| Leon Panetta (Carmel Valley) | Democratic | January 3, 1977 – January 3, 1993 | 95th 96th 97th 98th 99th 100th 101st 102nd | Elected in 1976. Re-elected in 1978. Re-elected in 1980. Re-elected in 1982. Re-elected in 1984. Re-elected in 1986. Re-elected in 1988. Re-elected in 1990. Redistricted to the 17th district | Monterey, San Benito, northern San Luis Obispo, southern Santa Cruz |
| Don Edwards (San Jose) | Democratic | January 3, 1993 – January 3, 1995 | 103rd | Redistricted from the 10th district and re-elected in 1992. Retired. | Santa Clara |
| Zoe Lofgren (San Jose) | Democratic | January 3, 1995 – January 3, 2013 | 104th 105th 106th 107th 108th 109th 110th 111th 112th | Elected in 1994. Re-elected in 1996. Re-elected in 1998. Re-elected in 2000. Re-elected in 2002. Re-elected in 2004. Re-elected in 2006. Re-elected in 2008. Re-elected in 2010. Redistricted to the 19th district | Santa Clara |
| Zoe Lofgren (San Jose) | Democratic | January 3, 1995 – January 3, 2013 | 104th 105th 106th 107th 108th 109th 110th 111th 112th | Elected in 1994. Re-elected in 1996. Re-elected in 1998. Re-elected in 2000. Re-elected in 2002. Re-elected in 2004. Re-elected in 2006. Re-elected in 2008. Re-elected in 2010. Redistricted to the 19th district | 2003–2013 Santa Clara (San Jose) |
| Jim Costa (Fresno) | Democratic | January 3, 2013 – January 3, 2023 | 113th 114th 115th 116th 117th | Redistricted from the 20th district and re-elected in 2012. Re-elected in 2014. Re-elected in 2016. Re-elected in 2018. Re-elected in 2020. Redistricted to the 21st district. | 2013–2023 Central Valley including Fresno and Merced |
| Anna Eshoo (Atherton) | Democratic | January 3, 2023 – January 3, 2025 | 118th | Redistricted from the 18th district and re-elected in 2022. Retired. | 2023–present portions of Santa Clara, San Mateo, and Santa Cruz counties, extending from the southwestern San Francisco Bay Area through the Santa Cruz Mountains to the Pacific coast. |
| Sam Liccardo (San Jose) | Democratic | January 3, 2025– present | 119th | Elected in 2024. Re-elected in 2026. | 2023–present portions of Santa Clara, San Mateo, and Santa Cruz counties, extending from the southwestern San Francisco Bay Area through the Santa Cruz Mountains to the Pacific coast. |

== Election results ==
=== 1932 ===
1932 United States House of Representatives elections in California
| Party | Candidate | Votes | % |
|---|---|---|---|
| Democratic | John F. Dockweiler | 70,333 | 54.9 |
| Republican | Clyde Woodworth | 57,718 | 45.1 |
| Total votes | | 128,051 | 100.0 |
| Turnout | | | |
| Democratic win (new seat) | | | |

=== 1934 ===
1934 United States House of Representatives elections in California
| Party | Candidate | Votes | % |
|---|---|---|---|
| Democratic | John F. Dockweiler (inc.) | 119,332 | 100.0 |
| Turnout | | | |
| Democratic hold | | | |

=== 1936 ===
1936 United States House of Representatives elections in California
| Party | Candidate | Votes | % |
|---|---|---|---|
| Democratic | John F. Dockweiler (inc.) | 90,986 | 57.7 |
| Republican | Raymond V. Darby | 66,583 | 42.3 |
| Total votes | | 157,569 | 100.0 |
| Turnout | | | |
| Democratic hold | | | |

=== 1938 ===
1938 United States House of Representatives elections in California
| Party | Candidate | Votes | % |
|---|---|---|---|
| Republican | Leland M. Ford | 97,407 | 62.8 |
| Democratic | John F. Dockweiler (write-in) | 32,863 | 21.2 |
| Townsend | Ted E. Felt | 16,045 | 10.3 |
| Progressive Party (United States, 1924) | J. Barton Huthins | 6,643 | 4.3 |
| Communist | La Rue McCormick | 2,070 | 1.3 |
| Total votes | | 155,028 | 100.0 |
| Turnout | | | |
| Republican gain from Democratic | | | |

=== 1940 ===
1940 United States House of Representatives elections in California
| Party | Candidate | Votes | % |
|---|---|---|---|
| Republican | Leland M. Ford | 188,049 | 96.4 |
| Communist | George C. Sandy | 7,017 | 3.6 |
| Total votes | | 195,066 | 100.0 |
| Turnout | | | |
| Republican hold | | | |

=== 1942 ===
1942 United States House of Representatives elections in California
| Party | Candidate | Votes | % |
|---|---|---|---|
| Democratic | Will Rogers Jr. | 61,437 | 53.7 |
| Republican | Leland M. Ford (incumbent) | 52,023 | 45.4 |
| Communist | Allen L. Ryan | 1,043 | 0.9 |
| Total votes | | 114,503 | 100.0 |
| Turnout | | | |
| Democratic gain from Republican | | | |

=== 1944 ===
1944 United States House of Representatives elections in California
| Party | Candidate | Votes | % |
|---|---|---|---|
| Democratic | Ellis E. Patterson (inc.) | 105,835 | 54.1 |
| Republican | Jesse Randolph Kellems | 89,700 | 45.9 |
| Total votes | | 195,535 | 100.0 |
| Turnout | | | |
| Democratic hold | | | |

=== 1946 ===
1946 United States House of Representatives elections in California
| Party | Candidate | Votes | % |
|---|---|---|---|
| Republican | Donald L. Jackson | 78,264 | 53.9 |
| Democratic | Harold Harby | 45,951 | 31.7 |
| Democratic | Ellis E. Patterson (write-in) | 20,945 | 14.4 |
| Total votes | | 145,160 | 100.0 |
| Turnout | | | |
| Republican gain from Democratic | | | |

=== 1948 ===
1948 United States House of Representatives elections in California
| Party | Candidate | Votes | % |
|---|---|---|---|
| Republican | Donald L. Jackson (inc.) | 121,198 | 57 |
| Democratic | Ellis E. Patterson | 91,268 | 43 |
| Total votes | | 212,466 | 100 |
| Turnout | | | |
| Republican hold | | | |

=== 1950 ===
1950 United States House of Representatives elections in California
| Party | Candidate | Votes | % |
|---|---|---|---|
| Republican | Donald L. Jackson (inc.) | 115,970 | 59.3 |
| Democratic | S. Mark Hogue | 79,744 | 40.7 |
| Total votes | | 195,714 | 100.0 |
| Turnout | | | |
| Republican hold | | | |

=== 1952 ===
1952 United States House of Representatives elections in California
| Party | Candidate | Votes | % |
|---|---|---|---|
| Republican | Donald L. Jackson (inc.) | 79,127 | 59.7 |
| Democratic | S. Mark Hogue | 53,337 | 40.3 |
| Total votes | | 132,464 | 100.0 |
| Turnout | | | |
| Republican hold | | | |

=== 1954 ===
1954 United States House of Representatives elections in California
| Party | Candidate | Votes | % |
|---|---|---|---|
| Republican | Donald L. Jackson (inc.) | 63,124 | 60.8 |
| Democratic | S. Mark Hogue | 40,659 | 39.2 |
| Total votes | | 103,783 | 100.0 |
| Turnout | | | |
| Republican hold | | | |

=== 1956 ===
1956 United States House of Representatives elections in California
| Party | Candidate | Votes | % |
|---|---|---|---|
| Republican | Donald L. Jackson (inc.) | 84,050 | 60.8 |
| Democratic | G. Robert "Bob" Fleming | 53,624 | 39.2 |
| Total votes | | 137,674 | 100.0 |
| Turnout | | | |
| Republican hold | | | |

=== 1958 ===
1958 United States House of Representatives elections in California
| Party | Candidate | Votes | % |
|---|---|---|---|
| Republican | Donald L. Jackson (inc.) | 70,724 | 57.8 |
| Democratic | Melvin Lennard | 51,616 | 42.2 |
| Total votes | | 122,340 | 100.0 |
| Turnout | | | |
| Republican hold | | | |

=== 1960 ===
1960 United States House of Representatives elections in California
| Party | Candidate | Votes | % |
|---|---|---|---|
| Republican | Alphonzo E. Bell Jr. | 83,601 | 55.4 |
| Democratic | Jerry Pacht | 67,318 | 44.6 |
| Total votes | | 150,919 | 100.0 |
| Turnout | | | |
| Republican hold | | | |

=== 1962 ===
1962 United States House of Representatives elections in California
| Party | Candidate | Votes | % |
|---|---|---|---|
| Democratic | Bernice F. Sisk (incumbent) | 108,339 | 71.8 |
| Republican | Arthur L. Selland | 42,401 | 28.2 |
| Total votes | | 150,740 | 100.0 |
| Turnout | | | |
| Democratic hold | | | |

=== 1964 ===
1964 United States House of Representatives elections in California
| Party | Candidate | Votes | % |
|---|---|---|---|
| Democratic | Bernice F. Sisk (incumbent) | 117,727 | 66.8 |
| Republican | David T. Harris | 58,604 | 33.2 |
| Total votes | | 176,331 | 100.0 |
| Turnout | | | |
| Democratic hold | | | |

=== 1966 ===
1966 United States House of Representatives elections in California
| Party | Candidate | Votes | % |
|---|---|---|---|
| Democratic | Bernice F. Sisk (incumbent) | 118,063 | 71.4 |
| Republican | Cecil F. White | 47,329 | 28.6 |
| Total votes | | 165,392 | 100.0 |
| Turnout | | | |
| Democratic hold | | | |

=== 1968 ===
1968 United States House of Representatives elections in California
| Party | Candidate | Votes | % |
|---|---|---|---|
| Democratic | Bernice F. Sisk (incumbent) | 97,473 | 62.5 |
| Republican | Dave Harris | 55,192 | 35.4 |
| American Independent | John P. Carroll | 3,390 | 2.2 |
| Total votes | | 156,055 | 100.0 |
| Turnout | | | |
| Democratic hold | | | |

=== 1970 ===
1970 United States House of Representatives elections in California
| Party | Candidate | Votes | % |
|---|---|---|---|
| Democratic | Bernice F. Sisk (incumbent) | 95,118 | 66.4 |
| Republican | Phillip V. Sanchez | 43,843 | 30.6 |
| American Independent | James W. Scott | 4,237 | 3.0 |
| Total votes | | 143,198 | 100.0 |
| Turnout | | | |
| Democratic hold | | | |

=== 1972 ===
1972 United States House of Representatives elections in California
| Party | Candidate | Votes | % |
|---|---|---|---|
| Democratic | Bernice F. Sisk (incumbent) | 134,079 | 79.1 |
| Republican | Carol Harner | 35,384 | 20.9 |
| Total votes | | 169,463 | 100.0 |
| Turnout | | | |
| Democratic hold | | | |

=== 1974 ===
1974 United States House of Representatives elections in California
| Party | Candidate | Votes | % |
|---|---|---|---|
| Republican | Burt L. Talcott (incumbent) | 76,084 | 49.2 |
| Democratic | Julian Camacho | 74,018 | 47.8 |
| American Independent | D. Jeff Mauro | 4,576 | 3.0 |
| Total votes | | 154,678 | 100.0 |
| Turnout | | | |
| Republican hold | | | |

=== 1976 ===
1976 United States House of Representatives elections in California
| Party | Candidate | Votes | % |
|---|---|---|---|
| Democratic | Leon Panetta | 104,545 | 53.4 |
| Republican | Burt L. Talcott (incumbent) | 91,160 | 46.6 |
| Total votes | | 195,705 | 100.0 |
| Turnout | | | |
| Democratic gain from Republican | | | |

=== 1978 ===
1978 United States House of Representatives elections in California
| Party | Candidate | Votes | % |
|---|---|---|---|
| Democratic | Leon Panetta (incumbent) | 104,550 | 61.4 |
| Republican | Eric Seastrand | 65,808 | 38.6 |
| Total votes | | 170,358 | 100.0 |
| Turnout | | | |
| Democratic hold | | | |

=== 1980 ===
1980 United States House of Representatives elections in California
| Party | Candidate | Votes | % |
|---|---|---|---|
| Democratic | Leon Panetta (incumbent) | 158,360 | 71.0 |
| Republican | W. A. "Jack" Roth | 54,675 | 24.5 |
| Libertarian | Kenton H. Bowers | 6,802 | 3.0 |
| Peace and Freedom | D. Jeff Mauro | 3,198 | 1.4 |
| Total votes | | 223,035 | 100.0 |
| Turnout | | | |
| Democratic hold | | | |

=== 1982 ===
1982 United States House of Representatives elections in California
| Party | Candidate | Votes | % |
|---|---|---|---|
| Democratic | Leon Panetta (incumbent) | 142,630 | 85.4 |
| Republican | Gary Richard Arnold | 24,448 | 14.6 |
| Total votes | | 167,078 | 100.0 |
| Turnout | | | |
| Democratic hold | | | |

=== 1984 ===
1984 United States House of Representatives elections in California
| Party | Candidate | Votes | % |
|---|---|---|---|
| Democratic | Leon Panetta (incumbent) | 153,377 | 70.8 |
| Republican | Patricia Smith Ramsey | 60,065 | 27.7 |
| Libertarian | Bill Anderson | 3,245 | 1.5 |
| Total votes | | 216,687 | 100.0 |
| Turnout | | | |
| Democratic hold | | | |

=== 1986 ===
1986 United States House of Representatives elections in California
| Party | Candidate | Votes | % |
|---|---|---|---|
| Democratic | Leon Panetta (incumbent) | 128,151 | 78.4 |
| Republican | Louis Darrigo | 31,386 | 19.2 |
| Peace and Freedom | Ron Wright | 2,017 | 1.2 |
| Libertarian | Bill Anderson | 1,944 | 1.2 |
| Total votes | | 163,498 | 100.0 |
| Turnout | | | |
| Democratic hold | | | |

=== 1988 ===
1988 United States House of Representatives elections in California
| Party | Candidate | Votes | % |
|---|---|---|---|
| Democratic | Leon Panetta (incumbent) | 177,452 | 78.6 |
| Republican | Stanley K. Monteith | 48,375 | 21.4 |
| Total votes | | 225,827 | 100.0 |
| Turnout | | | |
| Democratic hold | | | |

=== 1990 ===
1990 United States House of Representatives elections in California
| Party | Candidate | Votes | % |
|---|---|---|---|
| Democratic | Leon Panetta (incumbent) | 134,236 | 74.2 |
| Republican | Jerry M. Reiss | 39,885 | 22.0 |
| Libertarian | Brian H. Tucker | 6,881 | 3.8 |
| Total votes | | 181,002 | 100.0 |
| Turnout | | | |
| Democratic hold | | | |

=== 1992 ===
1992 United States House of Representatives elections in California
| Party | Candidate | Votes | % |
|---|---|---|---|
| Democratic | Don Edwards (incumbent) | 96,661 | 62 |
| Republican | Ted Bundesen | 49,843 | 32 |
| Peace and Freedom | Amani S. Kummba | 9,370 | 6 |
| No party | Hunt (write-in) | 5 | 0 |
| No party | Loeber (write-in) | 3 | 0 |
| No party | James (write-in) | 1 | 0 |
| Total votes | | 155,883 | 100.0 |
| Turnout | | | |
| Democratic hold | | | |

=== 1994 ===
1994 United States House of Representatives elections in California
| Party | Candidate | Votes | % |
|---|---|---|---|
| Democratic | Zoe Lofgren | 74,935 | 64.96 |
| Republican | Lyle J. Smith | 40,409 | 35.03 |
| No party | Barraza (write-in) | 8 | 0.01 |
| Total votes | | 115,352 | 100.0 |
| Turnout | | | |
| Democratic hold | | | |

=== 1996 ===
1996 United States House of Representatives elections in California
| Party | Candidate | Votes | % |
|---|---|---|---|
| Democratic | Zoe Lofgren (incumbent) | 94,020 | 65.7 |
| Republican | Chuck Wojslaw | 43,197 | 30.2 |
| Libertarian | David Bonino | 4,124 | 2.8 |
| Natural Law | Abaan Abu-Shumays | 1,866 | 1.3 |
| Total votes | | 143,207 | 100.0 |
| Turnout | | | |
| Democratic hold | | | |

=== 1998 ===
1998 United States House of Representatives elections in California
| Party | Candidate | Votes | % |
|---|---|---|---|
| Democratic | Zoe Lofgren (incumbent) | 85,503 | 72.82 |
| Republican | Horace Eugene Thayn | 27,494 | 23.42 |
| Natural Law | John H. Black | 4,417 | 3.76 |
| Total votes | | 117,414 | 100.0 |
| Turnout | | | |
| Democratic hold | | | |

=== 2000 ===
2000 United States House of Representatives elections in California
| Party | Candidate | Votes | % |
|---|---|---|---|
| Democratic | Zoe Lofgren (incumbent) | 115,118 | 72.1 |
| Republican | Horace "Gene" Thayn | 37,213 | 23.3 |
| Libertarian | Dennis Michael Umphress | 4,742 | 3.0 |
| Natural Law | Edward J. Klein | 2,673 | 1.6 |
| Total votes | | 159,746 | 100.0 |
| Turnout | | | |
| Democratic hold | | | |

=== 2002 ===
2002 United States House of Representatives elections in California
| Party | Candidate | Votes | % |
|---|---|---|---|
| Democratic | Zoe Lofgren (incumbent) | 72,370 | 67.1 |
| Republican | Douglas Adams McNea | 32,182 | 29.8 |
| Libertarian | Dennis Michael Umphress | 3,434 | 3.1 |
| Total votes | | 104,556 | 100.0 |
| Turnout | | | |
| Democratic hold | | | |

=== 2004 ===
2004 United States House of Representatives elections in California
| Party | Candidate | Votes | % |
|---|---|---|---|
| Democratic | Zoe Lofgren (incumbent) | 129,222 | 70.9 |
| Republican | Lawrence R. Wiesner | 47,992 | 26.4 |
| Libertarian | Markus Welch | 5,067 | 2.7 |
| Total votes | | 182,281 | 100.0 |
| Turnout | | | |
| Democratic hold | | | |

=== 2006 ===
2006 United States House of Representatives elections in California
| Party | Candidate | Votes | % |
|---|---|---|---|
| Democratic | Zoe Lofgren (incumbent) | 98,929 | 72.8 |
| Republican | Charel Winston | 37,130 | 27.2 |
| Total votes | | 136,059 | 100.0 |
| Turnout | | | |
| Democratic hold | | | |

=== 2008 ===
2008 United States House of Representatives elections in California
| Party | Candidate | Votes | % |
|---|---|---|---|
| Democratic | Zoe Lofgren (incumbent) | 146,481 | 71.3 |
| Republican | Charel Winston | 49,399 | 24.1 |
| Libertarian | Steven Wells | 9,447 | 4.6 |
| Total votes | | 205,327 | 100.0 |
| Turnout | | | |
| Democratic hold | | | |

=== 2010 ===
2010 United States House of Representatives elections in California
| Party | Candidate | Votes | % |
|---|---|---|---|
| Democratic | Zoe Lofgren (incumbent) | 105,841 | 67.82 |
| Republican | Daniel Sahagun | 37,913 | 24.29 |
| Libertarian | Edward Gonzalez | 12,304 | 7.89 |
| Total votes | | 156,058 | 100.00 |
| Turnout | | | |
| Democratic hold | | | |

=== 2012 ===
2012 United States House of Representatives elections in California
| Party | Candidate | Votes | % |
|---|---|---|---|
| Democratic | Jim Costa (incumbent) | 84,649 | 57% |
| Republican | Brian Daniel Whelan | 62,801 | 43% |
| Total votes | | 147,450 | 100.0% |
| Democratic hold | | | |

=== 2014 ===
2014 United States House of Representatives elections in California
| Party | Candidate | Votes | % |
|---|---|---|---|
| Democratic | Jim Costa (incumbent) | 46,277 | 51% |
| Republican | Johnny Tacherra | 44,943 | 49% |
| Total votes | | 91,220 | 100.0% |
| Democratic hold | | | |

=== 2016 ===
2016 United States House of Representatives elections in California
| Party | Candidate | Votes | % |
|---|---|---|---|
| Democratic | Jim Costa (incumbent) | 97,473 | 58% |
| Republican | Johnny Tacherra | 70,483 | 42% |
| Total votes | | 167,956 | 100.0% |
| Democratic hold | | | |

=== 2018 ===
2018 United States House of Representatives elections in California
| Party | Candidate | Votes | % |
|---|---|---|---|
| Democratic | Jim Costa (incumbent) | 82,266 | 58% |
| Republican | Elizabeth Heng | 60,693 | 42% |
| Total votes | | 142,959 | 100.0% |
| Democratic hold | | | |

=== 2020 ===
2020 United States House of Representatives elections in California
| Party | Candidate | Votes | % |
|---|---|---|---|
| Democratic | Jim Costa (incumbent) | 128,690 | 59.4 |
| Republican | Kevin Cookingham | 88,039 | 40.6 |
| Total votes | | 216,729 | 100.0 |
| Democratic hold | | | |

=== 2022 ===
2022 United States House of Representatives elections in California
| Party | Candidate | Votes | % |
|---|---|---|---|
| Democratic | Anna Eshoo (incumbent) | 139,235 | 57.8 |
| Democratic | Rishi Kumar | 101,772 | 42.2 |
| Total votes | | 241,007 | 100.0 |
| Democratic hold | | | |

=== 2024 ===
2024 California's 16th congressional district election
| Party | Candidate | Votes | % |
|---|---|---|---|
| Democratic | Sam Liccardo | 179,583 | 58.2 |
| Democratic | Evan Low | 128,893 | 41.8 |
| Total votes | | 308,476 | 100.0 |
| Democratic hold | | | |

== Historical district boundaries ==
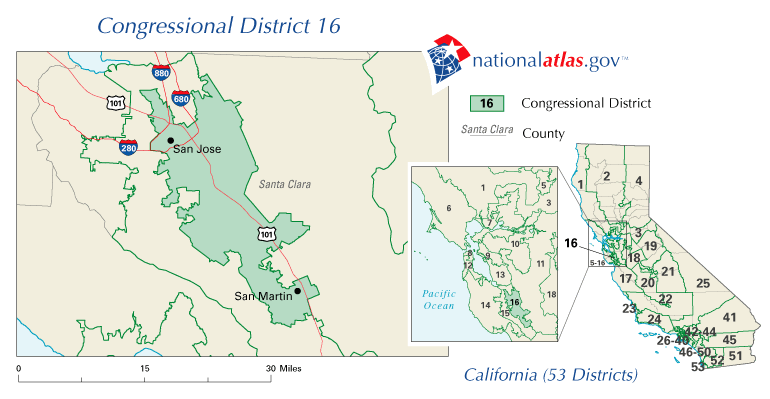
2003 - 2013

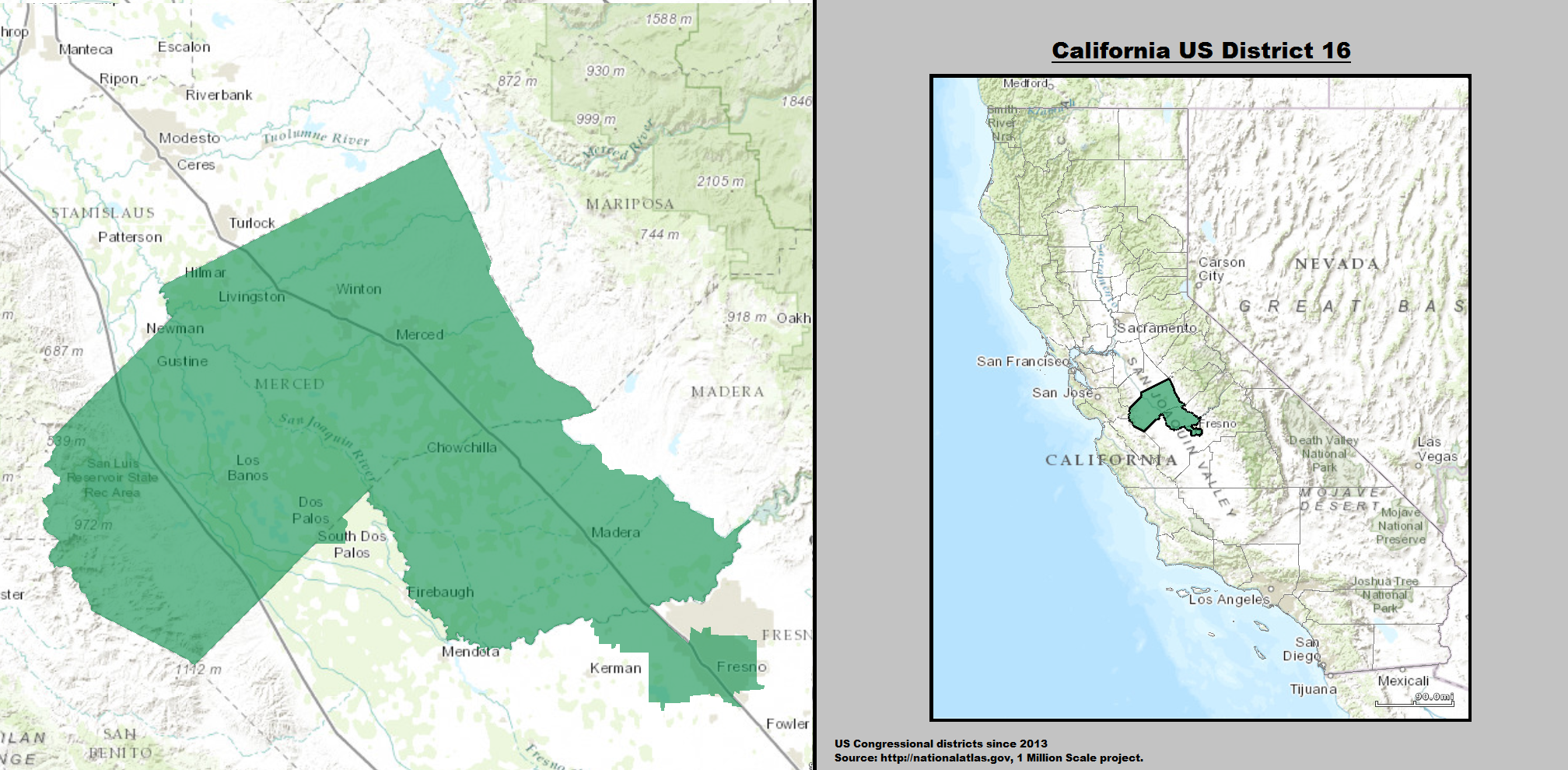
2013 - 2023

== See also ==
- List of United States congressional districts
- California's congressional districts
