= 1940 United States Senate election in California =

- November 5, 1940
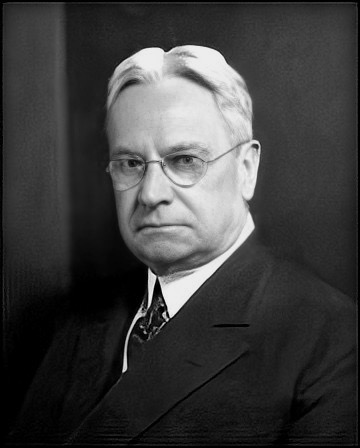

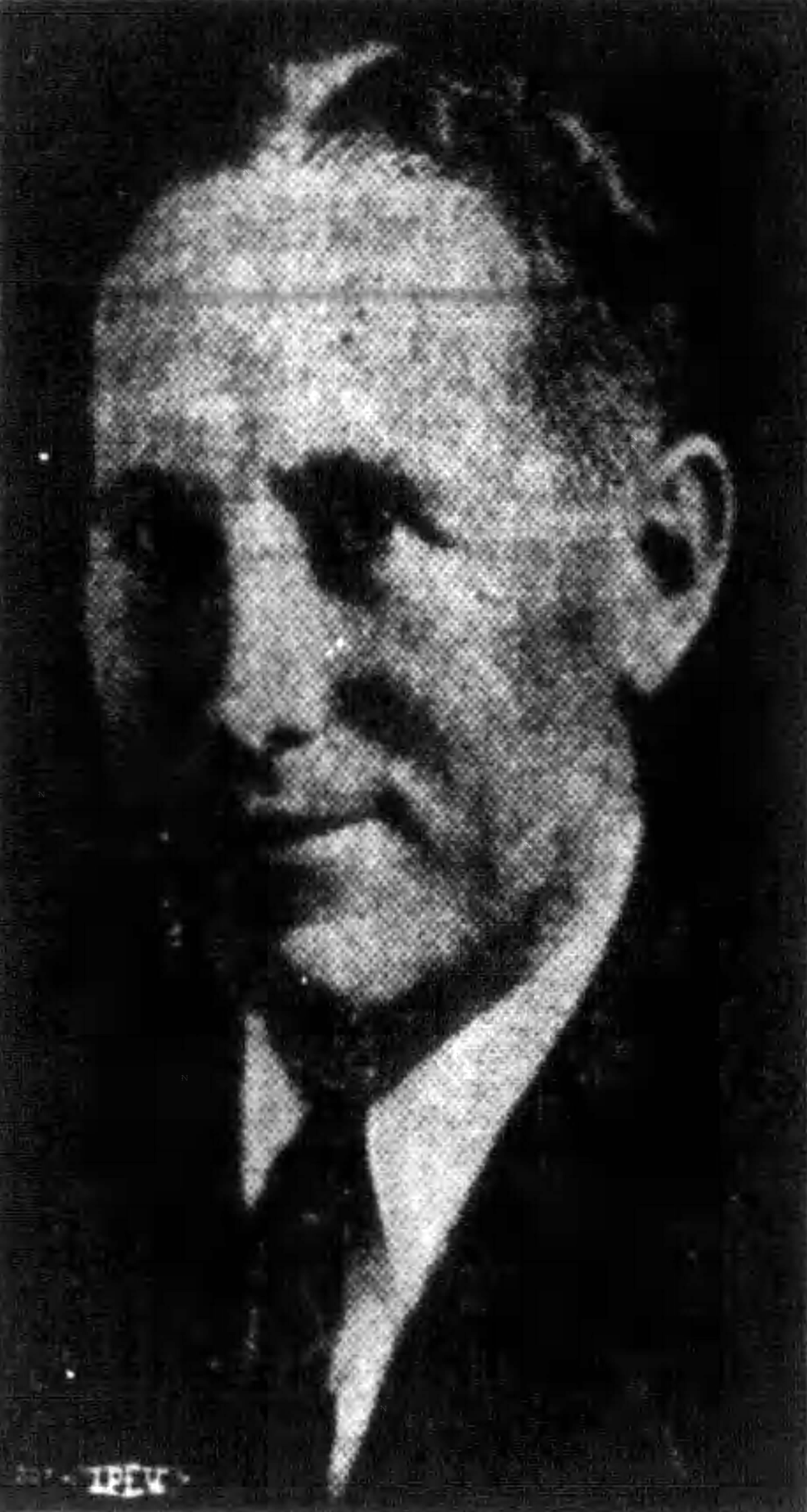
Nominee	Hiram Johnson	Fred Dyster
Party	Republican	Prohibition
Alliance	Democratic; Progressive
Popular vote	2,238,899	366,044
Percentage	82.62%	13.51%
- County results Johnson: 70–80% 80–90% >90%
U.S. senator before election
Hiram Johnson
Republican
Elected U.S. Senator
Hiram Johnson
Republican

The United States Senate election in California of 1940 was held on November 5, 1940. Incumbent Republican Senator Hiram Johnson was re-elected to his fifth term in office, though he would die in office in 1945.

By cross-filing and winning the Democratic and Progressive primaries, Johnson eliminated his strongest competition and handily won the general election with only nominal opposition from the Prohibition Party.

== Primaries ==
Primaries were held on August 27.

=== Republican primary ===
==== Candidates ====
- John Anson Ford, member of the Los Angeles County Board of Supervisors for District 3 (cross-filing)
- Hiram Johnson, incumbent Senator
- Ellis E. Patterson, Lieutenant Governor (cross-filing)
- Sam Yorty, State Assemblyman (cross-filing)

==== Results ====
Primary election results
Party	Candidate	Votes	%
Republican	Hiram Johnson (incumbent)	612,561	82.02%
Democratic	Ellis E. Patterson	54,834	7.34%
Democratic	John Anson Ford	46,310	6.20%
Democratic	Sam Yorty	33,142	4.44%
Total votes		1,007,926	100.00%

=== Democratic primary ===
==== Candidates ====
- John Anson Ford, member of the Los Angeles County Board of Supervisors for District 3
- Hiram Johnson, incumbent Senator (cross-filing)
- James D. Meredith
- Richard S. Otto
- Ellis E. Patterson, Lieutenant Governor
- Sam Yorty, State Assemblyman

==== Results ====
Primary election results
Party	Candidate	Votes	%
Republican	Hiram Johnson (incumbent)	507,389	50.34%
Democratic	Ellis E. Patterson	206,479	20.49%
Democratic	John Anson Ford	175,110	17.37%
Democratic	Sam Yorty	74,332	7.38%
Democratic	James D. Meredith	26,425	2.62%
Democratic	Richard S. Otto	18,191	1.81%
Total votes		746,847	100.00%

=== Progressive primary ===
==== Candidates ====
- Hiram Johnson, incumbent Senator (cross-filing)
- Richard S. Otto

==== Results ====
Primary election results
Party	Candidate	Votes	%
Republican	Hiram Johnson (incumbent)	2,060	61.40%
Democratic	Richard S. Otto	1,295	38.60%
Total votes		3,355	100.00%

=== Prohibition primary ===
==== Candidates ====
- Fred Dyster
- Hiram Johnson, incumbent Senator (write-in)

==== Results ====
Primary election results
Party	Candidate	Votes	%
Prohibition	Fred Dyster	1,314	77.66%
Republican	Hiram Johnson (incumbent) (write-in)	378	22.34%
Total votes		1,692	100.00%

== Third parties and independents ==
=== Communist ===
- Anita Whitney, women's rights activist, perennial candidate, and member of the Field family

=== Independent ===
A write-in bid was launched in support of John Anson Ford.

== General election ==
=== Results ===
1940 United States Senate election in California
Party	Candidate	Votes	%	±%
Republican	Hiram Johnson (incumbent)	2,238,899	82.62%	▼12.04
Prohibition	Fred Dyster	366,044	13.51%	N/A
Communist	Anita Whitney	97,478	3.60%	N/A
Independent	John Anson Ford (write-in)	7,415	0.27%	N/A
Total votes		2,709,836	100.00%	

== See also ==
- United States Senate elections, 1940
