= 1938 California lieutenant gubernatorial election =

- November 8, 1938
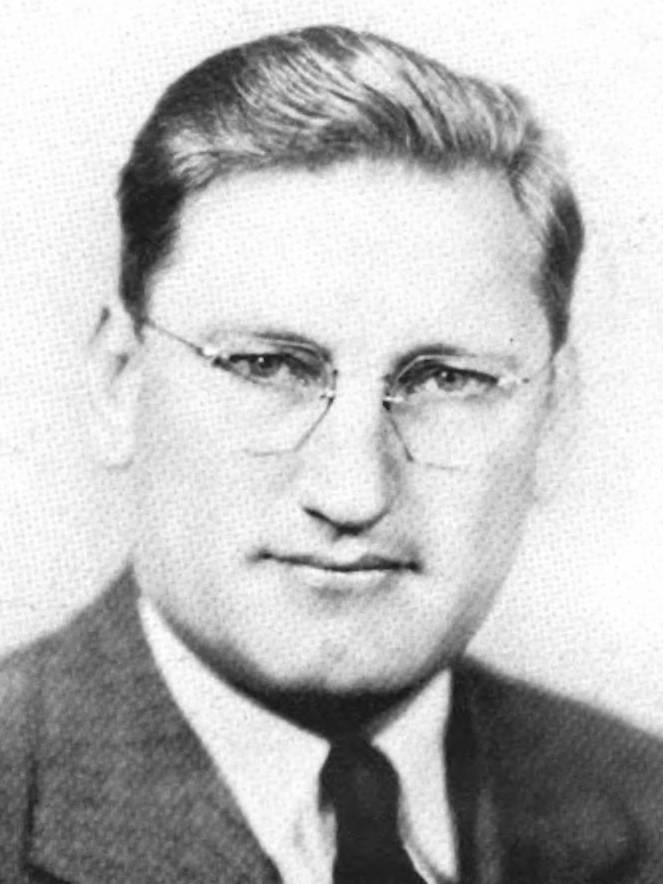

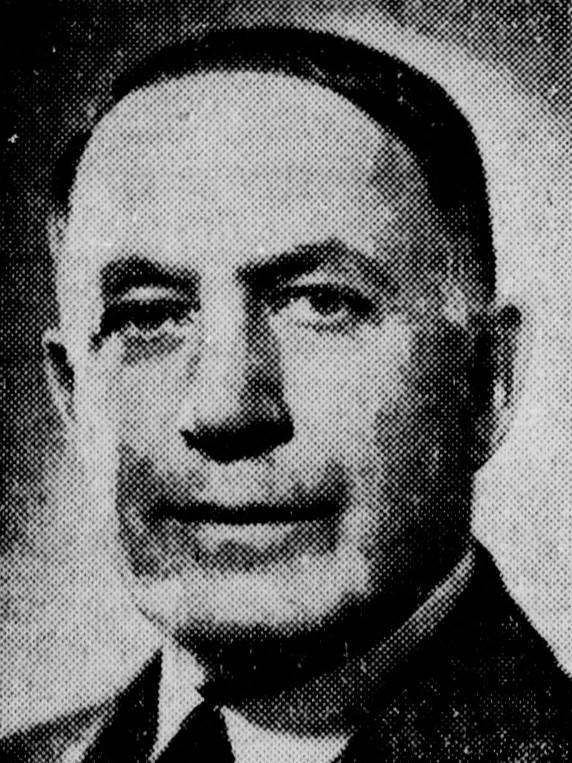
Nominee	Ellis E. Patterson	Walter Scott Franklin
Party	Democratic	Republican
Popular vote	1,296,395	1,139,967
Percentage	50.73%	44.61%
- County results Patterson: 40–50%% 50–60%% Franklin: 40–50% 50–60 60–70% 70–80%
Lieutenant Governor before election
George J. Hatfield
Republican
Elected Lieutenant Governor
Ellis E. Patterson
Democratic

The 1938 California lieutenant gubernatorial election was held on November 8, 1938. Democratic Assemblyman Ellis E. Patterson defeated Republican physician Walter Scott Franklin with 50.73% of the vote.

== General election ==
=== Candidates ===
- Ellis E. Patterson, Democratic
- Walter Scott Franklin, Republican
- Geneve L. A. Shaffer, Townsend

=== Results ===
1938 California lieutenant gubernatorial election
Party	Candidate	Votes	%	±%
Democratic	Ellis E. Patterson	1,296,395	50.73%	
Republican	Walter Scott Franklin	1,139,967	44.61%	
Townsend Party	Geneve L. A. Shaffer	117,083	4.58%	
Scattering		1,785	0.07%	
Majority		2,555,230		
Turnout				
Democratic gain from Republican		Swing		
