= 1940 Democratic Party presidential primaries =

Selection of the Democratic Party nominee

- March 12 to June 27, 1940

Delegates to the Democratic National Convention 547 delegates votes needed to win

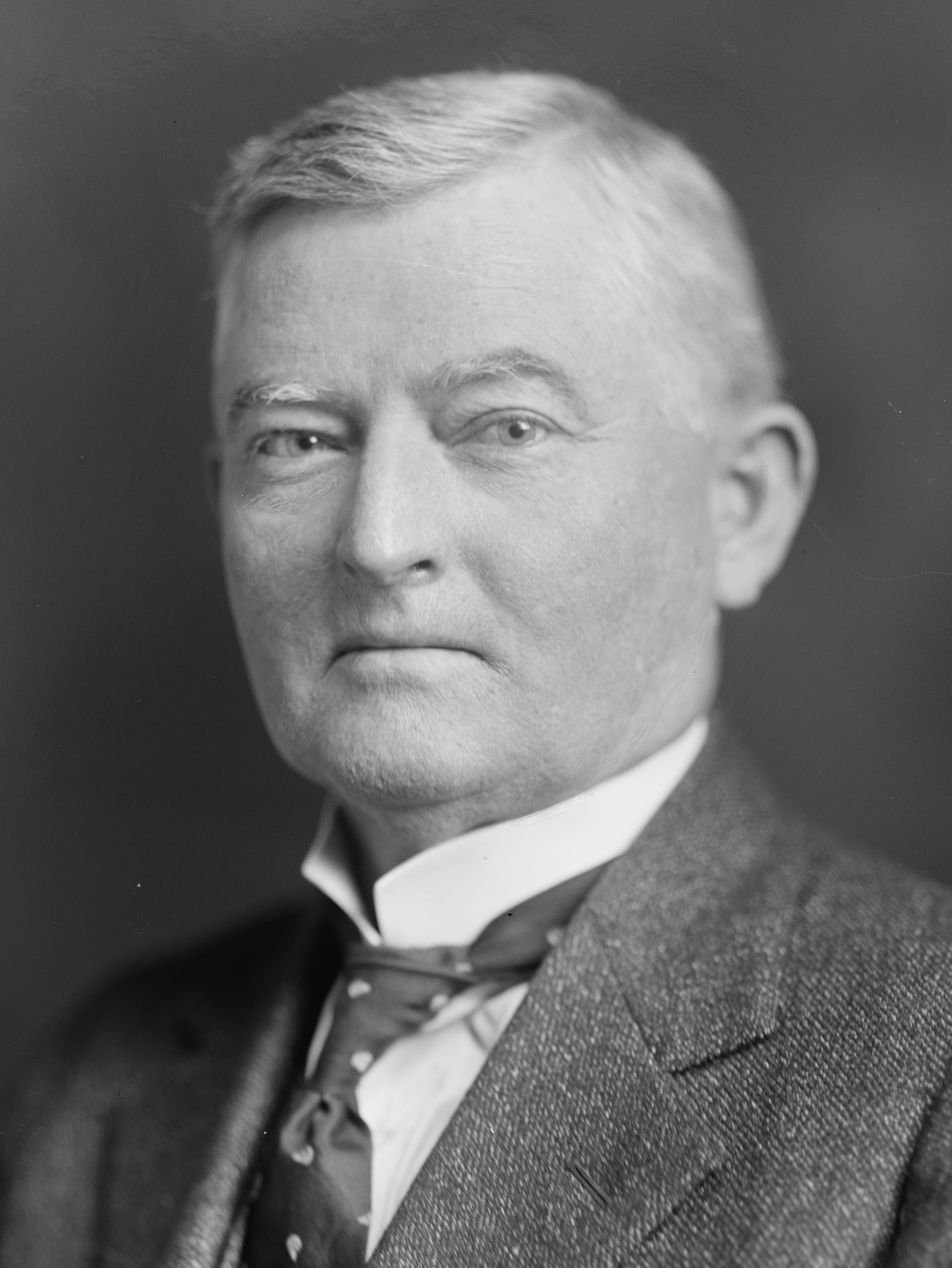

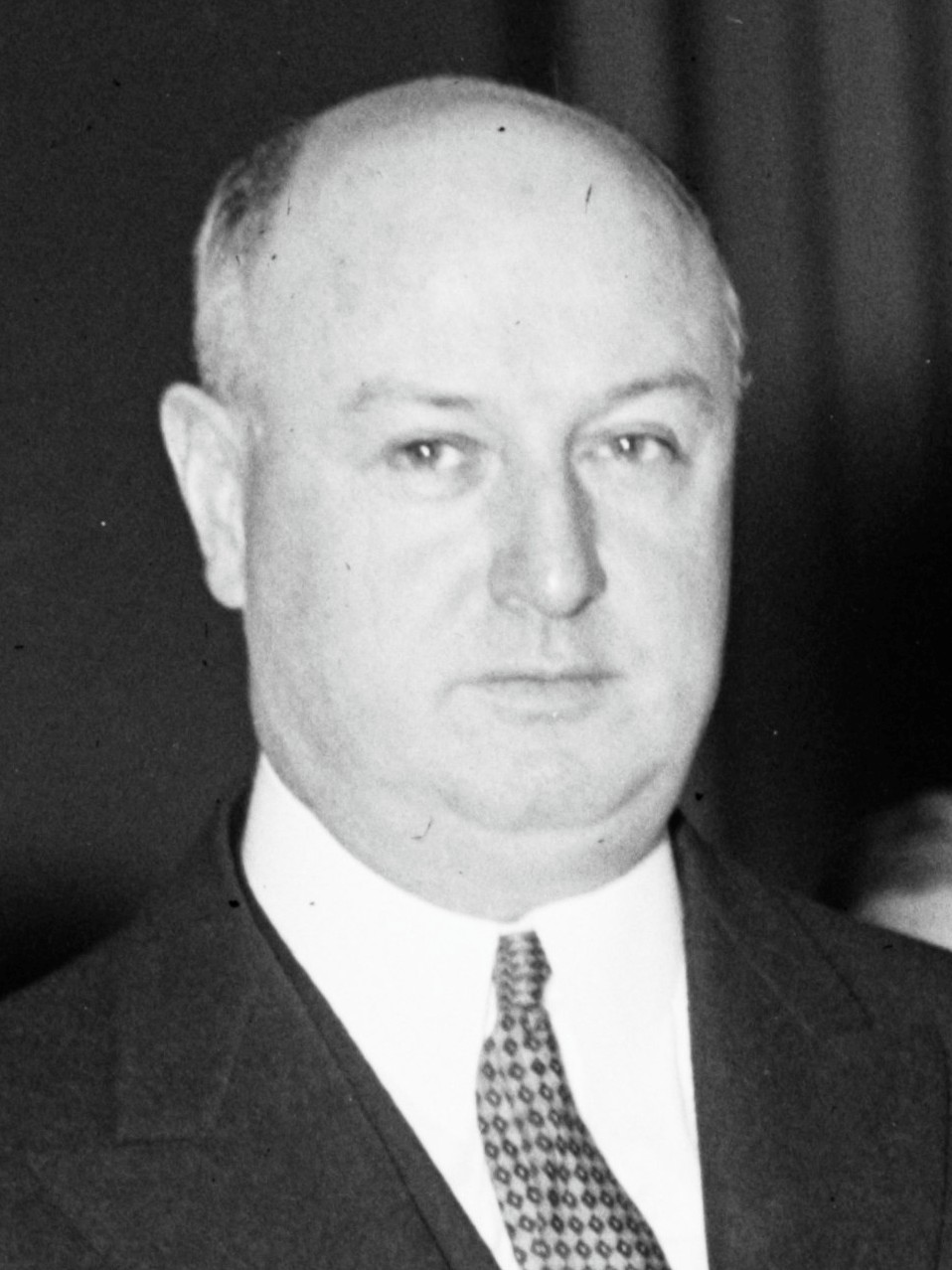
Candidate	Franklin D. Roosevelt	John Nance Garner	James Farley
Home state	New York	Texas	Massachusetts
Contests won	7	0	1
Popular vote	3,214,555	426,700	76,919
Percentage	71.93%	9.55%	1.71%
- First place finishes by convention roll call
Previous Democratic nominee
Franklin D. Roosevelt
Democratic nominee
Franklin D. Roosevelt

From March 12 to June 27, 1940, voters of the Democratic Party elected delegates to the 1940 Democratic National Convention through a series of primaries, caucuses, and conventions. Incumbent President Franklin D. Roosevelt was selected as the party's presidential nominee despite not formally declaring a campaign for a third term. Supporters effectively drafted Roosevelt, who was non-committal about seeking re-election, amid rising concerns over war in Europe.

Ahead of the convention, the primary process and other means of delegate allocation had led to the New York Times to project that Roosevelt had 691.5 delegates in support of him, well above Garner's 69.5 and Farley's 38.5.

== Candidates ==
=== Franklin D. Roosevelt ===
Incumbent President Roosevelt remained sufficiently popular to seek nomination for a third term, if he desired, though he had alienated many conservative and Southern members of his party, whom he had relied on for his 1932 nomination, by attempting to purge critics of the New Deal in the 1938 elections.

As foreign policy tensions mounted in Europe following the German annexation of Czechoslovakia and partition of Poland, Roosevelt was urged to run for an unprecedented third consecutive term. Roosevelt encouraged speculation but remained quiet. Privately, he prepared for his post-presidency, putting the finishing touches on a presidential library and signing a contract to become a contributing editor with Collier's upon his departure from office. In response to private lobbying from Senator George W. Norris, Roosevelt openly spoke of his hopes for retirement. The war in Europe had largely dragged to a halt, entering a phase now known as the "Phoney War." Amid rising hope for peace, Roosevelt returned to focusing on retirement.

The heir apparent to Roosevelt, should he decline to run, was Secretary of State Cordell Hull. Roosevelt encouraged his ambitions, intimating to Hull's wife at a cabinet dinner that the Secretary "had better get used to [making speeches]," because "[h]e'll have a lot of it to do soon." However, Hull found it impermissible to campaign while actively serving as Secretary and, knowing that his nomination would depend on Roosevelt's support, remained silent pending Roosevelt's decision.

Any chance of peace in Europe was ended on April 9, 1940, when Germany invaded Denmark and Norway. Around one month later, the Battle of France began and French forces quickly fell into retreat. Though Roosevelt never formally declared a candidacy, supporters entered his name in presidential preference contests and stood as delegates with the promise to nominate Roosevelt at the national party convention. In the Illinois primary, which required a candidate to make a sworn declaration of intent to seek the presidency, Roosevelt's name was placed on the ballot without any such declaration. Officials reasoned that he had been at sea when the deadline to declare passed.

Any doubts Roosevelt had about a third term were erased upon the Italian declaration of war on France. This, combined with isolationism among both parties in Congress, solidified his decision to accept re-nomination to a third term. When the Democratic delegates convened in July, none doubted that Roosevelt would accept their nomination.

=== John Nance Garner ===
Vice President John Nance Garner, who had been one of Roosevelt's primary opponents in 1932, announced his candidacy on December 18, 1939. His candidacy centered on opposition to the New Deal, Roosevelt personally, and the idea of a third term, but his conservatism put him on an uphill course with the rank-and-file of the party.

=== James Farley ===
Postmaster General and party chairman James Farley was the second challenger to Roosevelt but far more aligned with the New Deal platform than Garner. Farley had support from professional politicians but suffered from a lack of familiarity with policy issues and lingering anti-Catholicism. Cardinal George Mundelein lobbied Farley not to run, but he forcefully declined: "I will not let myself be kicked around by Roosevelt or anyone else."

=== Favorite sons ===
The following candidates were "favorite sons," who stood for nomination only in their respective home states for the purpose of controlling that state's delegation at the 1940 Democratic National Convention.

- Former lieutenant governor Charles W. Sawyer of Ohio
- Senator Joseph C. O'Mahoney of Wyoming
- Senator Millard Tydings of Maryland
- Senator Burton K. Wheeler of Montana

=== Declined ===
The following candidates were the subject of media speculation regarding a potential candidacy or were ambitious of the presidency, but ultimately declined to run:

- William O. Douglas, associate justice of the Supreme Court of the United States and former chair of the Securities Exchange Commission
- Harry Hopkins, U.S. secretary of commerce and trusted advisor to Roosevelt
- Cordell Hull, U.S. secretary of state
- Robert H. Jackson, attorney general of the United States
- Paul V. McNutt, administrator of the Federal Security Agency and former governor of Indiana
- Henry A. Wallace, U.S. secretary of Agriculture
- Joseph P. Kennedy, Sr., U.S. ambassador to the Court of St. James

== Schedule and results ==
Date (daily totals)	Total pledged delegates	Contest and total popular vote	Delegates won and popular vote				
Date (daily totals)	Total pledged delegates	Contest and total popular vote	Franklin Roosevelt	John Nance Garner	James Farley	Uninstructed	Other
March 12	8	New Hampshire primary	8; 10,567 (Note: These vote tallies are based on the candidate for delegate that gathered the most votes, not the slate as a whole.) (Note: There were eleven Pro-Roosevelt Delegates running.) (50.0%)	3,457 (Note: There was one Pro-Garner Delegate running.) (16%)	4,503 (Note: There were three Pro-Farley Delegates running.) (21%)	2,819 (Note: There were two Unpledged Delegates running.) (13%)	—
March 27	10	Maine convention	10	—	—	—	—
April 2	24	Wisconsin primary	21; 322,991 (75%)	3; 105,662 (25%)	—	—	—
April 6	6	Arizona convention	—	—	—	6	—
April 7	6	Puerto Rico convention	—	—	6	—	—
April 9 (64)	50 (of 58)	Illinois primary	50; 1,176,531 (86.0%)	190,081 (13.9%)	—	—	35 (0.0%)
April 9 (64)	14	Nebraska primary	14; 111,902 (100.0%)	—	—	—	—
April 15	8 (of 94)	New York convention	8	—	—	—	—
April 23	72	Pennsylvania primary	72; 724,657 (100%)	—	—	—	—
April 25	24	Georgia state committee	8	—	—	—	—
April 26	6	Hawaii convention	6	—	—	—	—
April 30	34	Massachusetts primary	0.5	—	32.5 (Note: The Massachusetts delegate slate was filed by party chairman William H. Burke Jr. as pledged to Farley with a caveat that if Roosevelt openly declared himself a candidate, the delegates were free to abandon their pledge to Farley in favor of Roosevelt. Ultimately, Roosevelt did enter the race, and the Massachusetts delegation voted for him at the convention.); 76,919 (Note: A breakdown of the delegate vote wasn't provided.) (100.0%)	1	—
May 5	8	South Dakota primary	—	—	—	8; 27,636 (100%)	—
May 7 (66)	22	Alabama primary	—	—	—	—	22; 196,508 (Note: The uninstructed delegates elected by the Alabama primary later supported favorite son William B. Bankhead.) (100%)
May 7 (66)	44	California primary	44; 723,782 (74%)	114,594 (12%)	—	—	139,055 (Note: 90,718 votes for Willis Allen and 48,337 votes for Ellis E. Patterson.) (14%)
May 11	22	Oklahoma convention	22	—	—	—	—
May 12	22	Iowa convention	22	—	—	—	—
May 13	16	North Dakota convention	16	—	—	—	—
May 14 (68)	52	Ohio primary	—	—	—	—	52; 283,952 (Note: The uninstructed delegates later supported favorite son Charles W. Sawyer.) (100%)
May 14 (68)	16	West Virginia primary	16; 102,729 (Note: H. C. Allen ran as a stalking horse for Roosevelt.) (100%)	—	—	—	—
May 17 (36)	10	Oregon primary	10; 109,913 (87%)	15,584 (12%)	—	—	601 (0.5%)
May 17 (36)	26	North Carolina convention	26	—	—	—	—
May 20	6	Delaware convention	6	—	—	—	—
May 21	32	New Jersey primary	32; 34,278 (99.5%)	59 (0.2%)	—	—	111 (0.3%)
May 22	16	Maryland convention	—	—	—	—	16 (Note: All 16 delegates were pledged to support favorite son Millard Tydings.)
May 23	6	Vermont convention	6	—	—	—	—
June 4	16	Connecticut convention	16	—	—	—	—
June 5	20	Louisiana state committee	—	—	—	—	20 (Note: Although the twenty delegates were initially unpledged, they supported favorite son O. John Rogge.)
June 10	18	Kansas convention	18	—	—	—	—
June 11	18	Mississippi convention	[data missing]				
June 14	22	Virginia state committee	—	—	—	20	—
June 15	38	Michigan convention	38	—	—	—	—
June 16 (28)	12	Nevada convention	—	—	—	12	—
June 16 (28)	16	Washington convention	16	—	—	—	—
June 18	18	Arkansas state committee	18	—	—	—	—
June 22	8 (of 58)	Illinois convention	8	—	—	—	—
June 27	28	Indiana convention	28	—	—	—	—

== See also ==
- Republican Party presidential primaries, 1940
- White primary
