= 1970 California Attorney General election =

- November 3, 1970
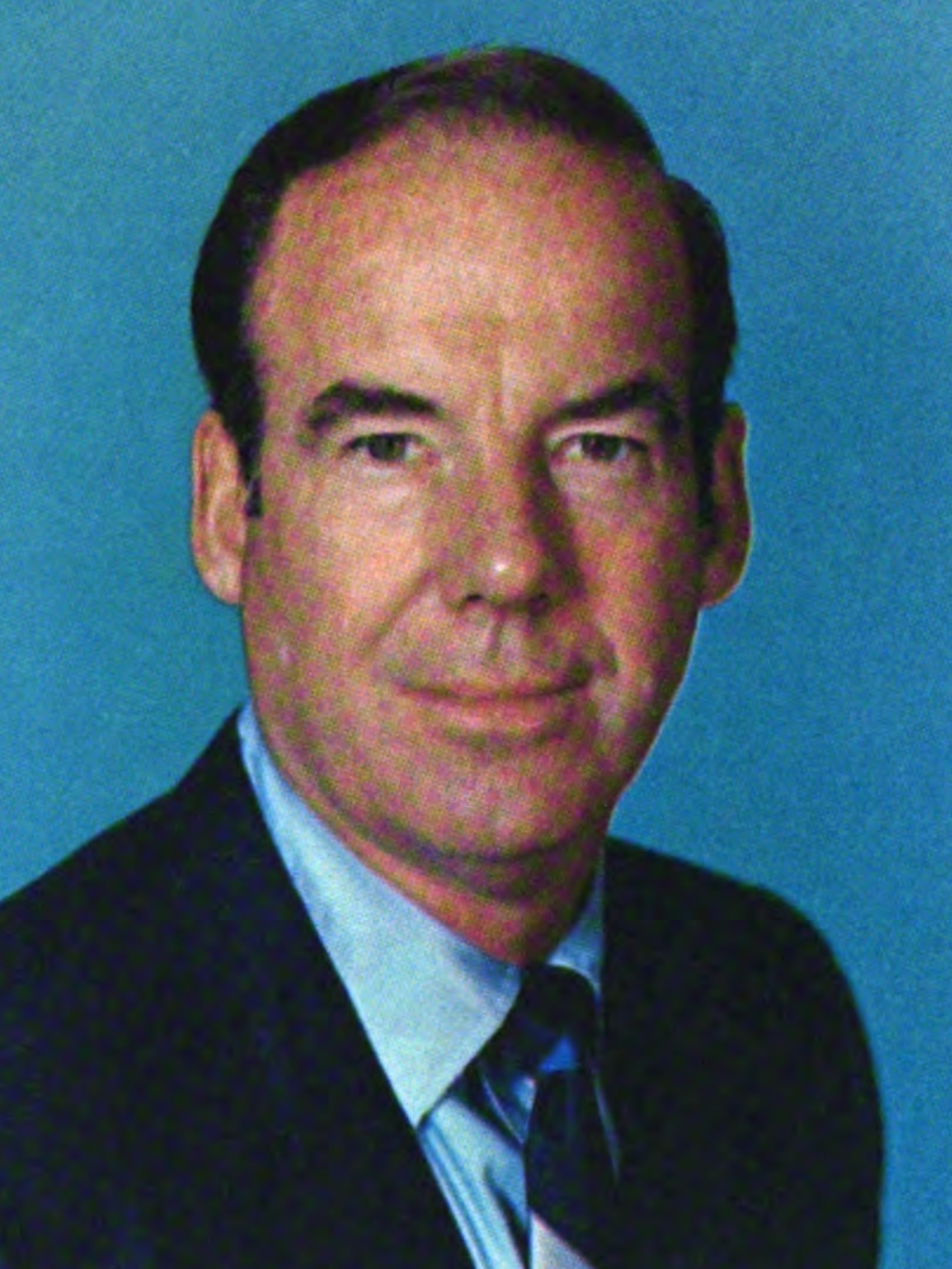

| Nominee | Evelle J. Younger | Charles A. O'Brien |
| Party | Republican | Democratic |
| Popular vote | 3,140,087 | 3,053,916 |
| Percentage | 49.3% | 47.9% |
- County results Younger: 40–50% 50–60% 60–70% O'Brien: 40–50% 50–60% 60–70%
Attorney General before election
Thomas C. Lynch
Democratic
Elected Attorney General
Evelle J. Younger
Republican

The 1970 California Attorney General election was held on November 3, 1970. Republican nominee Evelle J. Younger defeated Democratic nominee Charles A. O'Brien with 49.28% of the vote.

== Primary elections ==
Primary elections were held on June 9, 1970.

=== Democratic primary ===
==== Candidates ====
- Charles A. O'Brien, attorney
- Walter Culpepper

==== Results ====
Democratic primary results
| Party | Candidate | Votes | % |
|---|---|---|---|
| Democratic | Charles A. O'Brien | 1,858,459 | 85.05 |
| Democratic | Walter Culpepper | 326,748 | 14.95 |
| Total votes | | 2,185,207 | 100.00 |

=== Republican primary ===
==== Candidates ====
- Evelle J. Younger, Los Angeles County District Attorney
- John L. Harmer, State Senator
- Spencer Mortimer Williams, former Secretary of the California State Human Relations Agency
- George Deukmejian, State Senator

==== Results ====
Republican primary results
| Party | Candidate | Votes | % |
|---|---|---|---|
| Republican | Evelle J. Younger | 1,110,632 | 55.72 |
| Republican | John L. Harmer | 424,659 | 21.31 |
| Republican | Spencer Mortimer Williams | 245,803 | 12.33 |
| Republican | George Deukmejian | 212,189 | 10.65 |
| Total votes | | 1,993,283 | 100.00 |

== General election ==
=== Candidates ===
Major party candidates

- Evelle J. Younger, Republican
- Charles A. O'Brien, Democratic

Other candidate's

- Marguerite M. "Marge" Buckley, Peace and Freedom

=== Results ===
1970 California Attorney General election
| Party | Candidate | Votes | % | ±% |
|---|---|---|---|---|
| Republican | Evelle J. Younger | 3,140,087 | 49.28% | |
| Democratic | Charles A. O'Brien | 3,053,916 | 47.93% | |
| Peace and Freedom | Marguerite M. "Marge" Buckley | 177,716 | 2.79% | |
| Majority | | 86,171 | | |
| Turnout | | | | |
| Republican gain from Democratic | | Swing | | |
