= 1978 California Attorney General election =

- November 7, 1978
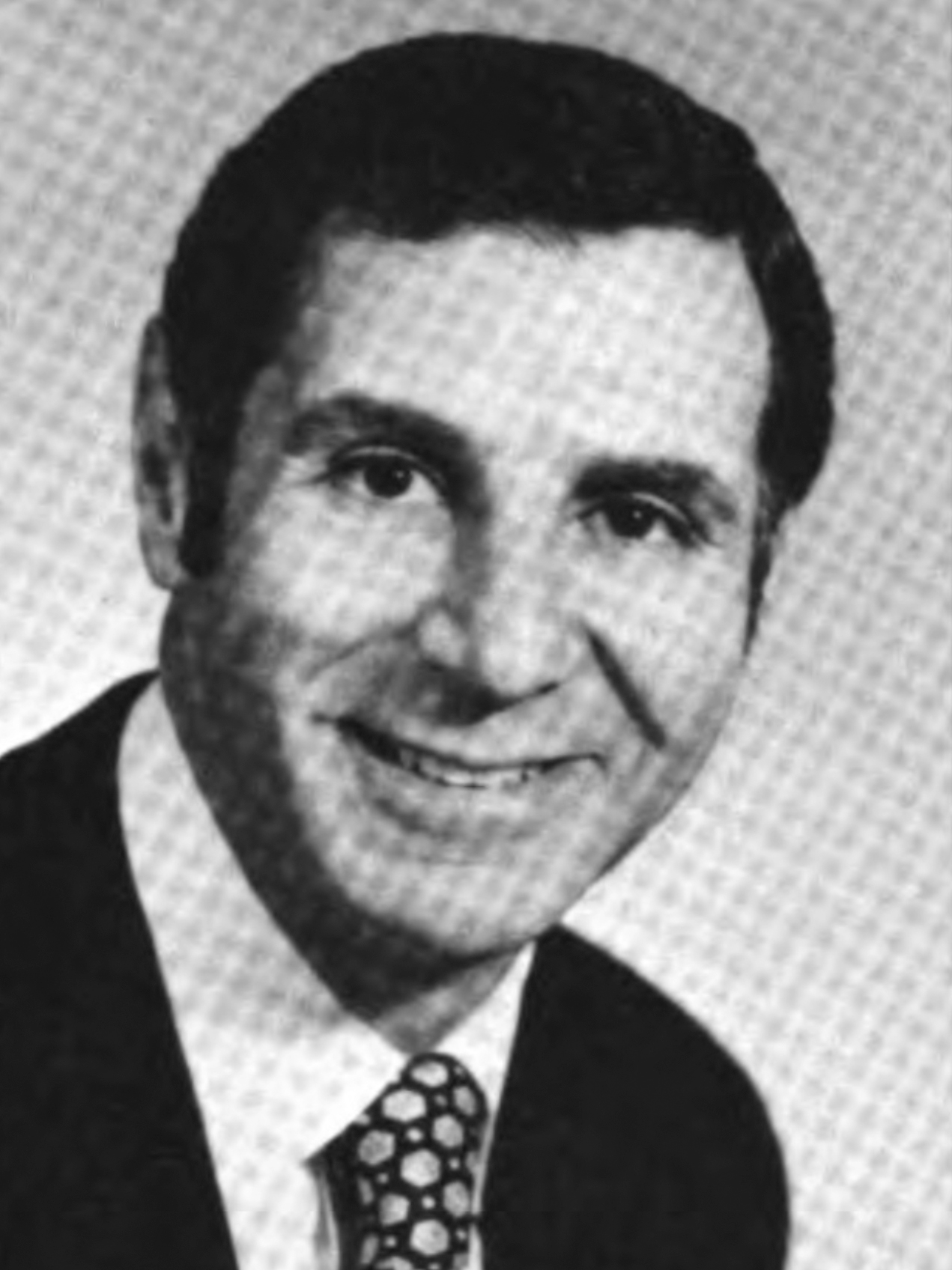

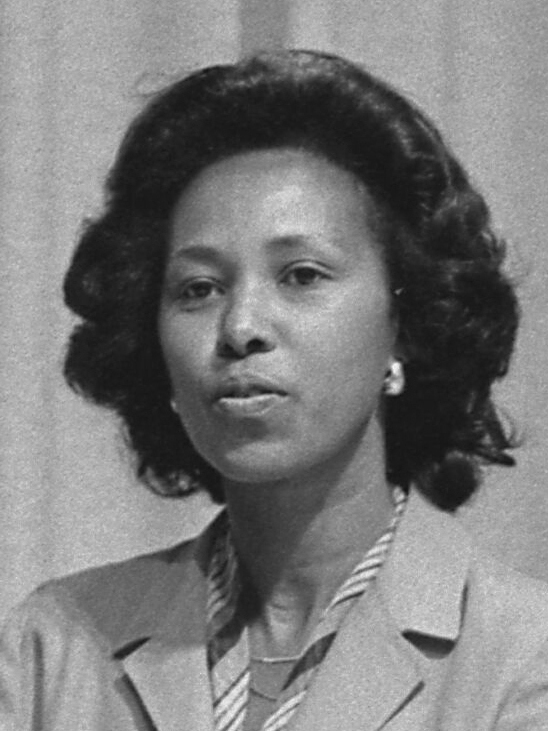
Nominee	George Deukmejian	Yvonne Brathwaite Burke
Party	Republican	Democratic
Popular vote	3,558,329	2,923,432
Percentage	52.9%	43.5%
- County results Deukmejian: 40–50% 50–60% 60–70% Burke: 40–50% 50–60% 60–70%
Attorney General before election
Evelle J. Younger
Republican
Elected Attorney General
George Deukmejian
Republican

The 1978 California Attorney General election was held on November 7, 1978. Republican nominee George Deukmejian defeated Democratic nominee Yvonne Brathwaite Burke with 52.88% of the vote.

== Primary elections ==
Primary elections were held on June 6, 1978.

=== Democratic primary ===
==== Candidates ====
- Yvonne Brathwaite Burke, U.S. Representative
- Burt Pines, Los Angeles City Attorney

==== Results ====
Democratic primary results
Party	Candidate	Votes	%
Democratic	Yvonne Brathwaite Burke	1,648,711	51.82
Democratic	Burt Pines	1,533,127	48.18
Total votes		3,181,838	100.00

=== Republican primary ===
==== Candidates ====
- George Deukmejian, State Senator from Long Beach
- James L. Browning Jr., former United States Attorney for the Northern District of California

==== Results ====
Republican primary results
Party	Candidate	Votes	%
Republican	George Deukmejian	1,410,654	64.96
Republican	James L. Browning Jr.	760,999	35.04
Total votes		2,171,653	100.00

== General election ==
=== Candidates ===
Major party candidates

- George Deukmejian, Republican
- Yvonne Brathwaite Burke, Democratic

Other candidate's

- Dallas Wendell Reid, American Independent
- Robert J. Evans, Peace and Freedom

=== Results ===
1978 California Attorney General election
Party	Candidate	Votes	%	±%
Republican	George Deukmejian	3,558,329	52.88%	
Democratic	Yvonne Brathwaite Burke	2,923,432	43.45%	
American Independent	Dallas Wendell Reid	127,685	1.90%	
Peace and Freedom	Robert J. Evans	119,157	1.77%	
Majority		634,897		
Turnout				
Republican hold		Swing		
