= 1978 California gubernatorial election =

- November 7, 1978
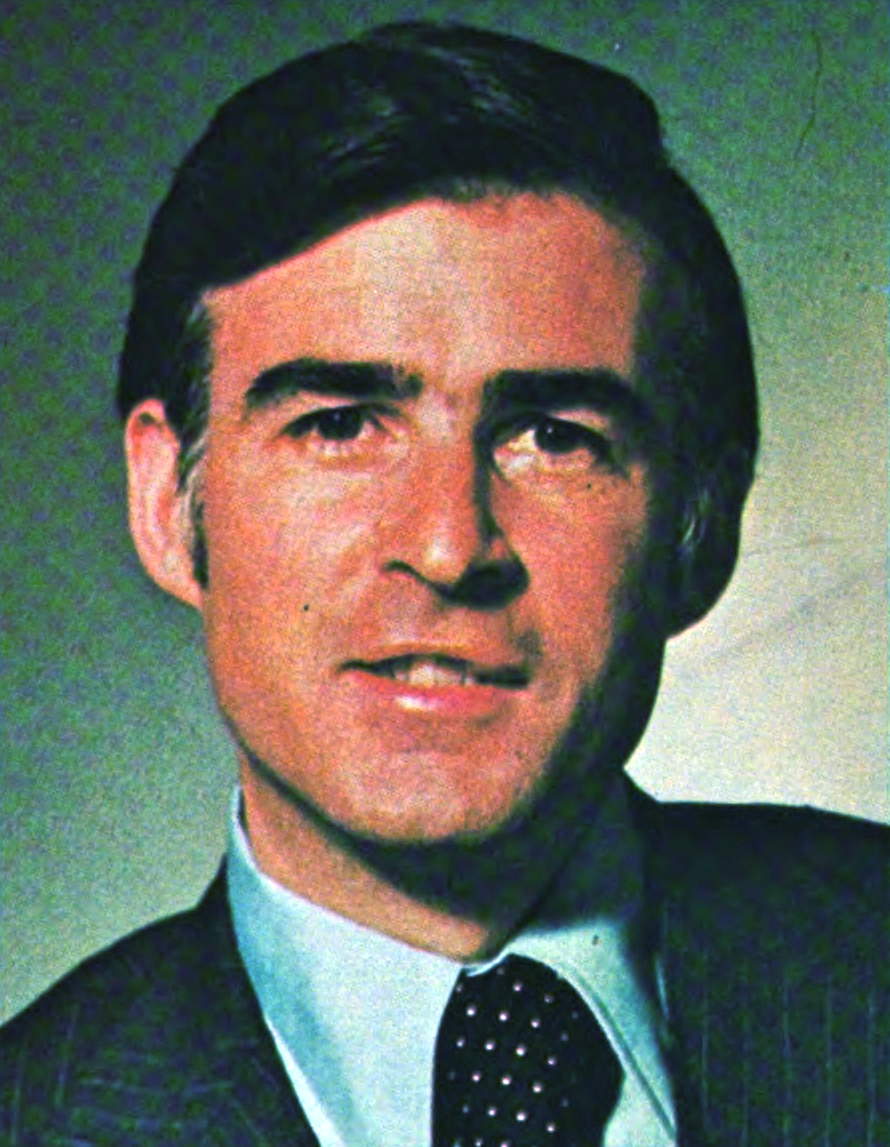

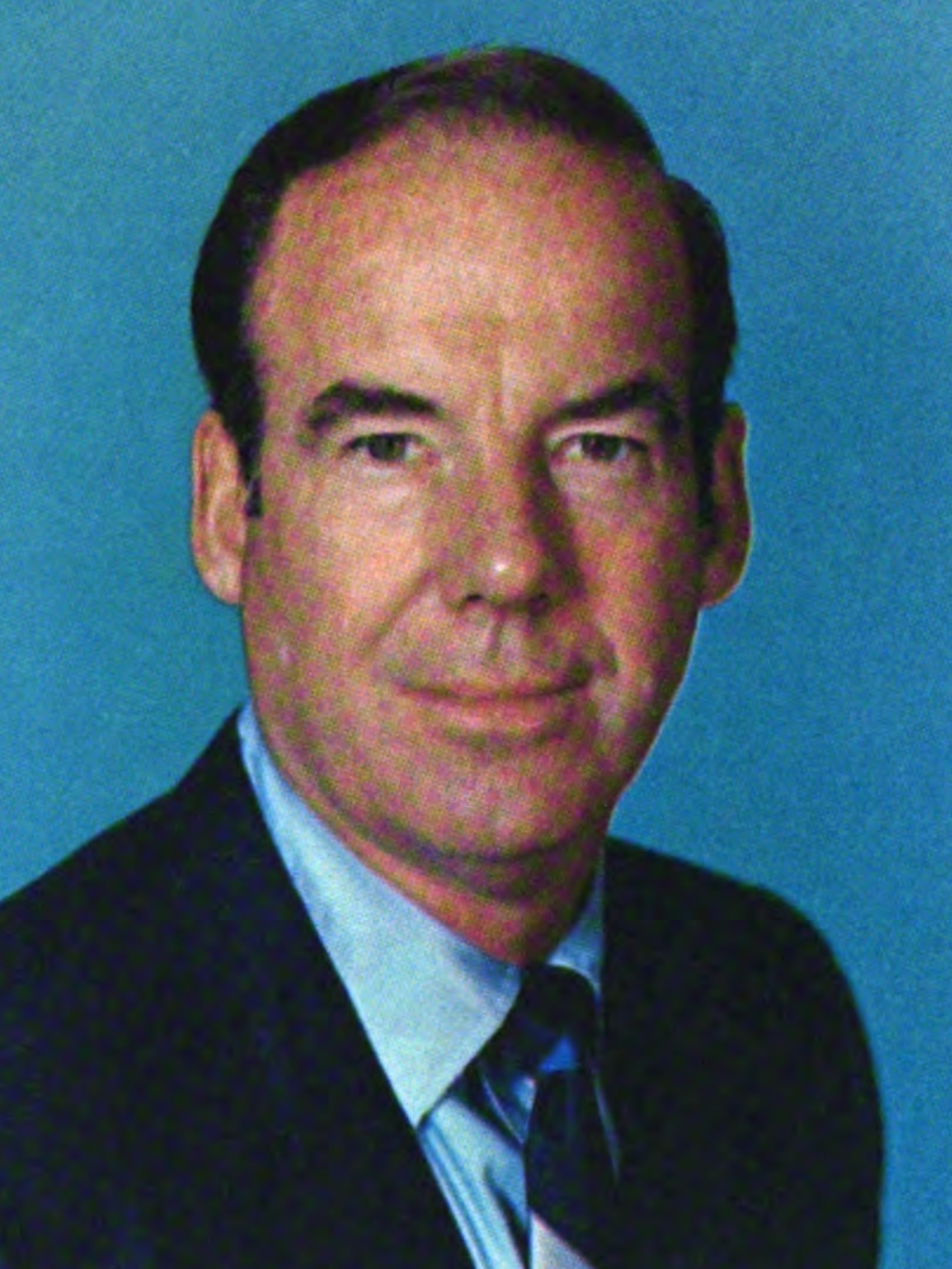

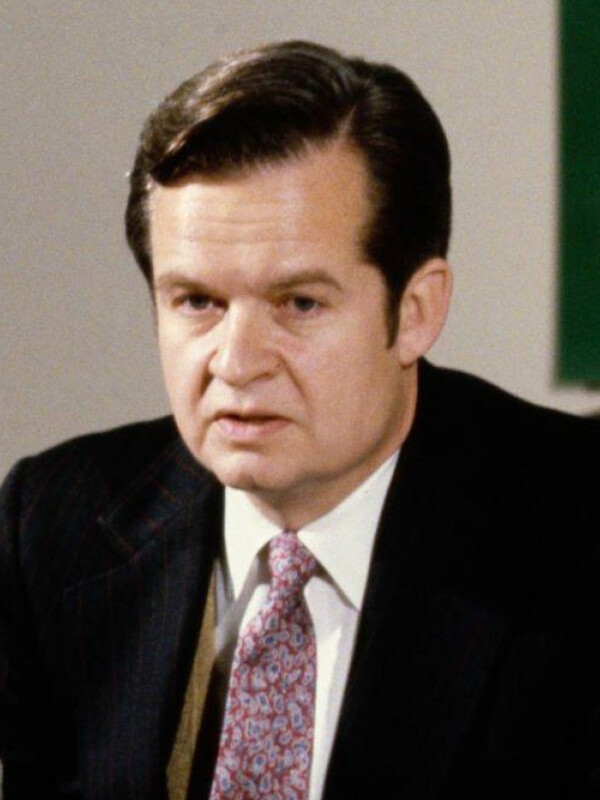
Nominee	Jerry Brown	Evelle Younger	Ed Clark
Party	Democratic	Republican	Independent
Popular vote	3,878,812	2,526,534	377,960
Percentage	56.05%	36.50%	5.46%
- Brown: 40–50% 50–60% 60–70% 70–80% 80–90% Younger: 40–50% 50–60%
Governor before election
Jerry Brown
Democratic
Elected Governor
Jerry Brown
Democratic

The 1978 California gubernatorial election occurred on November 7, 1978. The Democratic incumbent, Jerry Brown, defeated the Republican nominee Attorney General Evelle J. Younger and independent candidate Ed Clark in a landslide.

Primary elections were held on June 6. The party primaries were overshadowed by the results of Proposition 13, an initiative to alter the state property tax formula, which was approved on the same day. Brown had only minor opposition in the Democratic primary, and Younger defeated LAPD chief Edward M. Davis and Ken Maddy in the Republican primary. San Diego mayor Pete Wilson and John Briggs, the sponsor of Proposition 6 on the November ballot, also ran.

== Democratic primary ==
=== Candidates ===
- John Hancock Abbott
- Alex D. Aloia
- Gene Atherton
- Jerry Brown, incumbent governor since 1975
- Lowell Darling
- Jules Kimmett
- Raymond V. Liebenberg
- David Rock
- George B. Roden

=== Results ===
Democratic primary results
Party	Candidate	Votes	%
Democratic	Edmund G. Brown Jr. (incumbent)	2,567,067	77.53%
Democratic	David Rock	132,706	4.01%
Democratic	John Hancock Abbott	127,506	3.85%
Democratic	George B. Roden	125,790	3.80%
Democratic	Jules Kimmett	83,339	2.52%
Democratic	Gene Atherton	80,224	2.42%
Democratic	Alex D. Aloia	67,892	2.05%
Democratic	Raymond V. Liebenberg	65,219	1.97%
Democratic	Lowell Darling	60,997	1.84%
Democratic	Scattering	178	0.01%
Total votes		3,310,918	100.00%

== Republican primary ==
=== Candidates ===
- John Briggs, state senator from Fullerton and sponsor of Proposition 6
- Elmer L. Crutchley
- Edward M. Davis, former chief of the Los Angeles Police Department
- Kenneth L. Maddy, state senator from Fresno and Senate minority leader
- True R. Slocum Jr.
- Evelle J. Younger, Attorney General of California
- Pete Wilson, mayor of San Diego

=== Results ===
Republican primary results
Party	Candidate	Votes	%
Republican	Evelle J. Younger	1,008,087	40.04%
Republican	Ed Davis	738,087	29.34%
Republican	Ken Maddy	484,583	19.25%
Republican	Pete Wilson	230,146	9.14%
Republican	John V. Briggs	35,147	1.40%
Republican	True R. Slocum Jr.	11,824	0.47%
Republican	Elmer L. Crutchley	8,951	0.36%
Republican	Scattering	1	0.00%
Total votes		2,517,480	100.00%

== Other primaries ==
=== American Independent Party ===
American Independent primary results
Party	Candidate	Votes	%
American Independent	Theresa F. Dietrich	12,278	57.40%
American Independent	Laszlo Kecskemethy	9,112	42.60%
Total votes		21,390	100.00%

=== Peace and Freedom Party ===
Peace and Freedom primary results
Party	Candidate	Votes	%
Peace and Freedom	Marilyn Seals	6,278	100.00%
Total votes		6,278	100.00%

== General election ==
=== Candidates ===
- Jerry Brown, incumbent governor since 1975 (Democratic)
- Ed Clark, former chair of the Libertarian Party of California and Libertarian Party of New York (Independent)
- Theresa F. Dietrich (American Independent)
- Marilyn Seals (Peace and Freedom)
- Evelle J. Younger, Attorney General of California (Republican)

The primary battle left Younger short of money, while Brown had a much larger campaign fund and won reelection in a landslide.

=== Results ===
1978 California gubernatorial election
Party	Candidate	Votes	%	±%
Democratic	Edmund G. Brown Jr. (Incumbent)	3,878,812	56.03%	+5.91%
Republican	Evelle J. Younger	2,526,534	36.50%	−10.76%
Independent	Ed Clark	377,960	5.46%	
Peace and Freedom	Marilyn Seals	70,864	1.02%	−0.18%
American Independent	Theresa F. Dietrich	67,103	0.97%	−0.37%
	Scattering	1,105	0.02%	
Majority		1,352,278	19.53%	
Total votes		6,922,378	100.00%	
Democratic hold		Swing	+16.67%	

=== Results by county ===
County	Edmund G. Brown Jr. Democratic		Evelle J. Younger Republican		Ed Clark Independent		Marilyn Seals Peace & Freedom		Theresa F. Dietrich American Independent		Margin		Total votes cast (Note: County totals do not include the write-in votes, which are only given as statewide totals in the Statement of Vote.)
County	#	%	#	%	#	%	#	%	#	%	#	%	Total votes cast
Alameda	217,746	63.81%	88,619	25.97%	24,336	7.13%	7,375	2.16%	3,141	0.92%	129,127	37.84%	341,217
Alpine	202	52.74%	151	39.43%	18	4.70%	5	1.31%	7	1.83%	51	13.32%	383
Amador	4,144	49.65%	3,534	42.34%	477	5.71%	56	0.67%	136	1.63%	610	7.31%	8,347
Butte	26,051	49.65%	22,142	42.20%	3,038	5.79%	609	1.16%	634	1.21%	3,909	7.45%	52,474
Calaveras	4,019	48.74%	3,691	44.76%	377	4.57%	73	0.89%	86	1.04%	328	3.98%	8,246
Colusa	1,958	45.01%	2,005	46.09%	314	7.22%	37	0.85%	36	0.83%	-47	-1.08%	4,350
Contra Costa	122,565	54.27%	80,821	35.79%	17,989	7.97%	2,208	0.98%	2,250	1.00%	41,744	18.48%	225,833
Del Norte	2,451	41.73%	2,933	49.93%	188	3.20%	77	1.31%	225	3.83%	-482	-8.21%	5,874
El Dorado	13,832	48.35%	12,187	42.60%	1,819	6.36%	305	1.07%	466	1.63%	1,645	5.75%	28,609
Fresno	71,657	55.67%	50,950	39.58%	3,653	2.84%	1,135	0.88%	1,324	1.03%	20,707	16.09%	128,719
Glenn	3,120	42.98%	3,521	48.51%	444	6.12%	57	0.79%	117	1.61%	-401	-5.52%	7,259
Humboldt	21,243	50.37%	16,658	39.49%	2,783	6.60%	713	1.69%	781	1.85%	4,585	10.87%	42,178
Imperial	8,385	46.05%	8,629	47.39%	870	4.78%	157	0.86%	167	0.92%	-244	-1.34%	18,208
Inyo	2,540	39.53%	3,561	55.42%	218	3.39%	47	0.73%	59	0.92%	-1,021	-15.89%	6,425
Kern	49,144	47.71%	41,531	40.32%	10,560	10.25%	682	0.66%	1,078	1.05%	7,613	7.39%	102,995
Kings	8,794	53.84%	6,940	42.49%	281	1.72%	105	0.64%	215	1.32%	1,854	11.35%	16,335
Lake	6,670	52.87%	5,012	39.72%	651	5.16%	132	1.05%	152	1.20%	1,658	13.14%	12,617
Lassen	3,377	50.34%	2,849	42.47%	324	4.83%	57	0.85%	102	1.52%	528	7.87%	6,709
Los Angeles	1,178,368	57.34%	744,491	36.23%	93,692	4.56%	20,205	0.98%	18,256	0.89%	433,877	21.11%	2,055,012
Madera	7,529	52.17%	6,230	43.16%	414	2.87%	110	0.76%	150	1.04%	1,299	9.00%	14,433
Marin	49,759	55.75%	29,888	33.49%	7,683	8.61%	1,227	1.37%	698	0.78%	19,871	22.26%	89,255
Mariposa	2,361	53.02%	1,774	39.84%	212	4.76%	31	0.70%	75	1.68%	587	13.18%	4,453
Mendocino	11,877	54.14%	7,916	36.09%	1,442	6.57%	377	1.72%	325	1.48%	3,961	18.06%	21,937
Merced	16,825	55.62%	12,165	40.21%	756	2.50%	202	0.67%	303	1.00%	4,660	15.40%	30,251
Modoc	1,235	40.28%	1,616	52.71%	137	4.47%	27	0.88%	51	1.66%	-381	-12.43%	3,066
Mono	1,042	44.82%	1,164	50.06%	76	3.27%	18	0.77%	25	1.08%	-122	-5.25%	2,325
Monterey	34,649	52.35%	27,180	41.07%	3,278	4.95%	550	0.83%	530	0.80%	7,469	11.28%	66,187
Napa	19,202	50.53%	15,621	41.11%	2,461	6.48%	373	0.98%	344	0.91%	3,581	9.42%	38,001
Nevada	9,016	45.36%	8,365	42.09%	2,236	11.25%	123	0.62%	136	0.68%	651	3.28%	19,876
Orange	299,577	48.68%	272,076	44.21%	34,903	5.67%	3,845	0.62%	4,976	0.81%	27,501	4.47%	615,377
Placer	20,384	51.12%	15,563	39.03%	3,342	8.38%	268	0.67%	321	0.80%	4,821	12.09%	39,878
Plumas	3,599	55.48%	2,541	39.17%	208	3.21%	37	0.57%	102	1.57%	1,058	16.31%	6,487
Riverside	101,377	54.23%	75,564	40.42%	6,982	3.74%	1,235	0.66%	1,772	0.95%	25,813	13.81%	186.930
Sacramento	139,821	54.91%	88,445	34.74%	21,137	8.30%	2,862	1.12%	2,349	0.92%	51,376	20.18%	254,614
San Benito	2,805	49.23%	2,411	42.31%	349	6.12%	71	1.25%	62	1.09%	394	6.91%	5,698
San Bernardino	115,082	54.01%	86,638	40.66%	7,151	3.36%	1,402	0.66%	2,822	1.32%	28,444	13.35%	213,095
San Diego	316,223	57.49%	197,167	35.85%	25,964	4.72%	3,708	0.67%	6,945	1.26%	119,056	21.65%	550,007
San Francisco	156,601	69.46%	51,429	22.81%	11,577	5.13%	4,400	1.95%	1,458	0.65%	105,172	46.65%	225,465
San Joaquin	49,169	52.17%	39,425	41.84%	4,063	4.31%	536	0.57%	1,046	1.11%	9,744	10.34%	94,239
San Luis Obispo	25,695	51.20%	21,689	43.22%	1,772	3.53%	552	1.10%	478	0.95%	4,006	7.98%	50,186
San Mateo	113,402	56.18%	69,131	34.25%	15,072	7.47%	2,565	1.27%	1,678	0.83%	44,271	21.93%	201,848
Santa Barbara	59,933	56.68%	38,656	36.56%	4,763	4.50%	1,521	1.44%	858	0.81%	21,277	20.12%	105,731
Santa Clara	227,493	61.35%	110,444	29.79%	25,550	6.89%	3,784	1.02%	3,512	0.95%	117,049	31.57%	370,783
Santa Cruz	40,490	60.85%	20,698	31.11%	3,470	5.21%	1,376	2.07%	506	0.76%	19,792	29.74%	66,540
Shasta	19,432	55.26%	12,698	36.11%	2,256	6.42%	276	0.78%	501	1.42%	6,734	19.15%	35,163
Sierra	725	49.45%	644	43.93%	71	4.84%	11	0.75%	15	1.02%	81	5.53%	1,466
Siskiyou	6,851	51.11%	5,747	42.88%	497	3.71%	113	0.84%	196	1.46%	1,104	8.24%	13,404
Solano	34,513	58.05%	20,176	33.94%	3,670	6.17%	535	0.90%	558	0.94%	14,337	24.12%	59,452
Sonoma	56,920	54.29%	37,584	35.85%	7,506	7.16%	1,855	1.77%	981	0.94%	19,336	18.44%	104,846
Stanislaus	36,676	55.62%	25,247	38.29%	2,539	3.85%	678	1.03%	803	1.22%	11,429	17.33%	65,943
Sutter	6,357	44.09%	6,871	47.65%	1,003	6.96%	77	0.53%	111	0.77%	-514	-3.56%	14,419
Tehama	5,986	50.25%	5,002	41.99%	635	5.33%	81	0.68%	208	1.75%	984	8.26%	11,912
Trinity	2,215	50.39%	1,769	40.24%	298	6.78%	44	1.00%	70	1.59%	446	10.15%	4,396
Tulare	24,989	46.80%	26,136	48.95%	1,322	2.48%	315	0.59%	634	1.19%	-1,147	-2.15%	53,396
Tuolumne	6,772	51.09%	5,757	43.44%	478	3.61%	103	0.78%	144	1.09%	1,015	7.66%	13,254
Ventura	75,173	52.78%	57,777	40.57%	6,916	4.86%	854	0.60%	1,703	1.20%	17,396	12.21%	142,423
Yolo	24,357	59.39%	12,703	30.97%	3,064	7.47%	593	1.45%	298	0.73%	11,654	28.41%	41,015
Yuba	6,434	54.84%	4,402	37.52%	675	5.75%	94	0.80%	127	1.08%	2,032	17.32%	11,732
Total	3,878,812	56.03%	2,526,534	36.50%	377,960	5.46%	70,864	1.02%	67,103	0.97%	1,352,278	19.53%	6,922,378

==== Counties that flipped from Republican to Democratic ====
- Alpine
- Amador
- Butte
- Calaveras
- Contra Costa
- El Dorado
- Kern
- Lake
- Marin
- Mariposa
- Monterey
- Napa
- Nevada
- Orange
- Riverside
- San Benito
- San Diego
- San Joaquin
- San Luis Obispo
- Santa Barbara
- Stanislaus
- Tuolumne
- Ventura

==== Counties that flipped from Democratic to Republican ====
- Del Norte
- Imperial

== Analysis ==
Jerry Brown's landslide victory ended three of the remaining four very long streaks of Republican dominance in California counties. Brown was the first Democrat to ever carry Alpine County in a gubernatorial election since its establishment in 1864. The same was true for Orange County; it had always backed the Republican candidate since its establishment in 1889. Meanwhile, Santa Barbara County backed a Democratic candidate for the first time since 1882. After this election, the lone county with a long history of backing Republicans was Mono County, which had never backed a Democratic candidate since its founding in 1861 (Note: Mono County was carried by the Southern Democratic candidate in 1861 and an independent candidate in 1875.) and would not vote Democratic until 1998.

Conversely, Jerry Brown remains the most recent Democrat to carry any of the following counties: Calaveras, El Dorado, Lassen, Madera, Mariposa, Placer, Plumas, Shasta, Sierra, Siskiyou, Tehama, Tuolumne, and Yuba. Butte, Fresno, and Kern counties would not vote for a Democratic gubernatorial candidate again until 2026.
