= Bob Cline =

American politician (1933–2020)

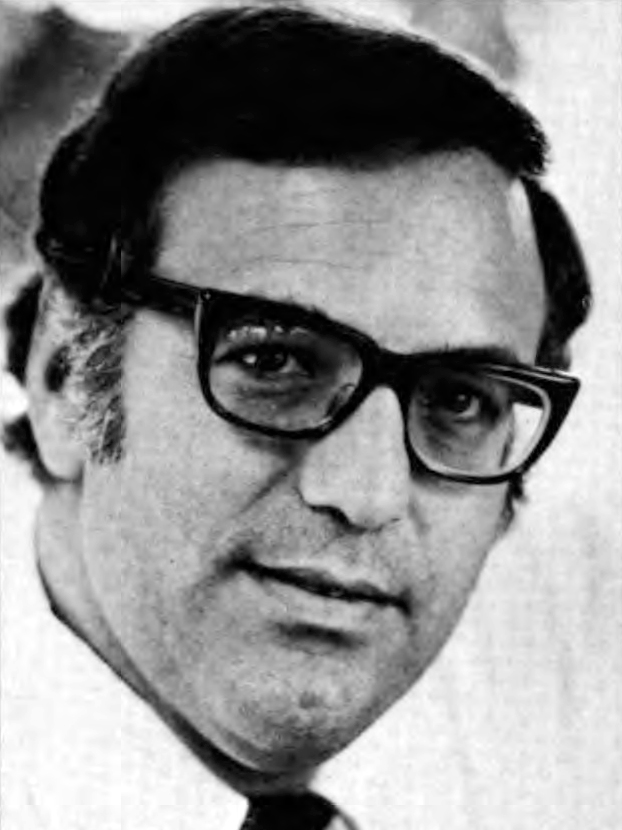
- Official portrait, 1975

Member of the California State Assembly
- In office January 4, 1971 – December 1, 1980
- Preceded by: Patrick D. McGee
- Succeeded by: Cathie Wright
- Constituency: 64th district (1971–1974); 37th district (1974–1980)

Personal details
- Born: May 6, 1933 San Francisco, California
- Died: May 15, 2020 (aged 87)
- Party: Republican
- Spouse(s): Betty C. Robison (m. ? - div. 1980); Jeannette Wilhoit (m. 1999)
- Children: 2
- Education: University of California, Berkeley
- Occupation: Financial and Tax Consultant

Military service
- Branch/service: United States Army
- Years of service: 1955-1957

Robert Corde Cline (May 6, 1933 – May 15, 2020) was an American politician from California and a member of the Republican Party. He was elected to the California State Assembly in 1970 and represented both the 64th and the renumbered 37th districts from 1971 to 1981. In 1980 Cline ran for the state senate seat being vacated by GOP veteran Lou Cusanovich but lost the primary to former Los Angeles Police Chief Ed Davis.

== Background ==
Cline was born in San Francisco, California. He served in the United States Army. Cline received his bachelor's and master's degree from University of California, Berkeley. Cline lived in San Bernardino, California with his wife and family. He was a tax and financial consultant.
