= Joseph Busch =

Joseph Busch may refer to:

- Joseph P. Busch (1926–1975), Los Angeles district attorney
- Joseph Francis Busch (1866–1953), American prelate of the Catholic Church
