= Robert Rock (disambiguation) =

Robert Rock is an English golfer.

Robert Rock may also refer to:

- Bob Rock, Canadian musician, sound engineer, and record producer
- Bobby Rock, drummer for American rock band Nitro
- Rob Rock, American heavy metal musician
- Robert L. Rock, American politician
- Robert F. Rock, American police chief
