= Cathie Wright =

American politician

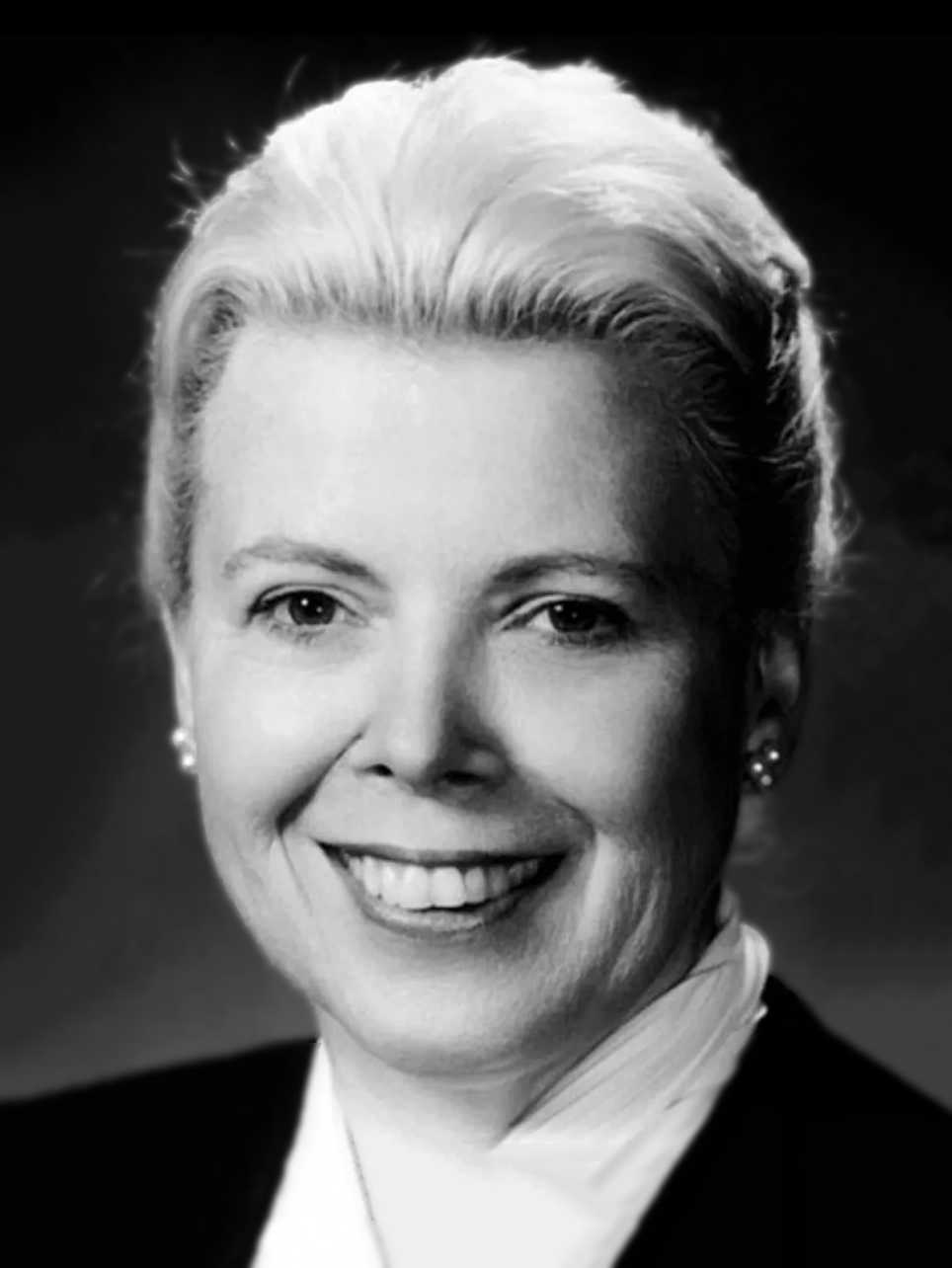
- Official portrait, 2000

Member of the California Senate from the 19th district
- In office December 7, 1992 – December 4, 2000
- Preceded by: Edward M. Davis
- Succeeded by: Tom McClintock

Member of the California State Assembly from the 37th district
- In office December 1, 1980 – December 7, 1992
- Preceded by: Bob Cline
- Succeeded by: Nao Takasugi

Personal details
- Born: May 18, 1929 Old Forge, Pennsylvania, U.S.
- Died: April 14, 2012 (aged 82) Simi Valley, California, U.S.
- Party: Republican
- Spouse: Victor (died)
- Children: 1

Cathie M. Wright (May 18, 1929 – April 14, 2012) was an American politician from California and a member of the Republican party.

== Early career ==
A onetime Simi Valley councilwoman, Wright was serving as mayor in 1980 when she won election to the California State Assembly seat vacated by Republican Bob Cline, who had made an unsuccessful run for state senate. She represented the Ventura county based 37th district until 1992, when she opted not to seek reelection.

== State senate ==
After 12 years in the Assembly, Wright instead ran for the open 19th state senate district held since 1980 by Republican stalwart Ed Davis, a former Los Angeles police chief. Davis didn't much like Wright (whom he dubbed "The Peroxide Princess of Simi Valley") and recruited former Assemblywoman Marion W. La Follette to run for the seat. After a bitter campaign, Wright prevailed, but just barely. She won reelection easily in 1996, but California state Term Limits prevented her from seeking reelection in 2000.

== Lieutenant governor race ==
In 1994 she became the Republican nominee for Lt. Governor by defeating moderate Assemblyman Stan Statham in the party's primary. Statham was best known for a proposal to split California into three states. Wright beat him handily but was soundly defeated by then Democratic state Controller Gray Davis in the general election.

== Controversy ==
One issue that has constantly dogged Wright was her seeking the help of then Democratic Assembly Speaker Willie Brown in an effort to have a judge go easy on her daughter, who had racked up numerous traffic violations.

== Electoral history ==
Member, California State Assembly: 1981–1993 Member, California State Senate : 1993–2001
Year	Office	Democrat	Votes	Pct	Republican	Votes	Pct
1980	California State Assembly; District 37	Arline Mathews	39,838	34.1%	Cathie Wright	66,937	57.3%
1982	California State Assembly; District 37	C.W. "Dick" Stine	38,574	38.7%	Cathie Wright	55,849	56%
1984	California State Assembly; District 37	none			Cathie Wright	105,919	100%
1986	California State Assembly; District 37	William Hesse	25,736	23.9%	Cathie Wright	80,477	74.6%
1988	California State Assembly; District 37	Jeffrey Marcus	37,617	24.9%	Cathie Wright	110,111	72.8%
1990	California State Assembly; District 37	Dennis A. Petrie	44,773	38.9%	Hunt Braly 41% Cathie Wright 59%	62,881	54.7%
1992	California State Senate; District 19	Hank Starr	108,052	38.8%	Roger Campbell 29% Marion La Follete 33% Cathie Wright 38%	148,116	53.2%
1994	California Lieutenant Governor	Gray Davis	4,441,429	52.4%	Stan Statham 37% Cathie Wright 63%	3,412,777	40.3%
1996	California State Senate; District 19	John Birke	97,133	37.8%	Cathie Wright	160,130	62.2%

California Assembly
Preceded by Bob Cline	California State Assembly, 37th District; December 1, 1980–November 30, 1992	Succeeded by William J. Knight
California Senate
Preceded by Ed Davis	California State Senate, 19th District; December 7, 1992–November 30, 2000	Succeeded by Tom McClintock
