= George Deukmejian =

Governor of California from 1983 to 1991

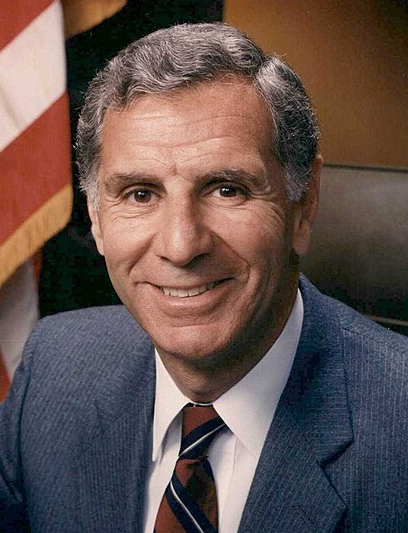
- Official portrait, c. 1983–1991

35th Governor of California
- In office January 3, 1983 – January 7, 1991
- Lieutenant: Leo T. McCarthy
- Preceded by: Jerry Brown
- Succeeded by: Pete Wilson

27th Attorney General of California
- In office January 8, 1979 – January 3, 1983
- Governor: Jerry Brown
- Preceded by: Evelle J. Younger
- Succeeded by: John Van de Kamp

Member of the California State Senate
- In office January 2, 1967 – January 8, 1979
- Preceded by: Gordon Cologne
- Succeeded by: Ollie Speraw
- Constituency: 31st district (1977–1979); 37th district (1967–1977)

Member of the California State Assembly from the 39th district
- In office January 7, 1963 – January 2, 1967
- Preceded by: John C. Williamson
- Succeeded by: James A. Hayes

Personal details
- Born: Courken George Deukmejian Jr. June 6, 1928 Menands, New York, U.S.
- Died: May 8, 2018 (aged 89) Long Beach, California, U.S.
- Party: Republican
- Spouse: Gloria Saatjian (m. 1957)
- Children: 3
- Education: Siena College (BA); St. John's University, New York (JD)
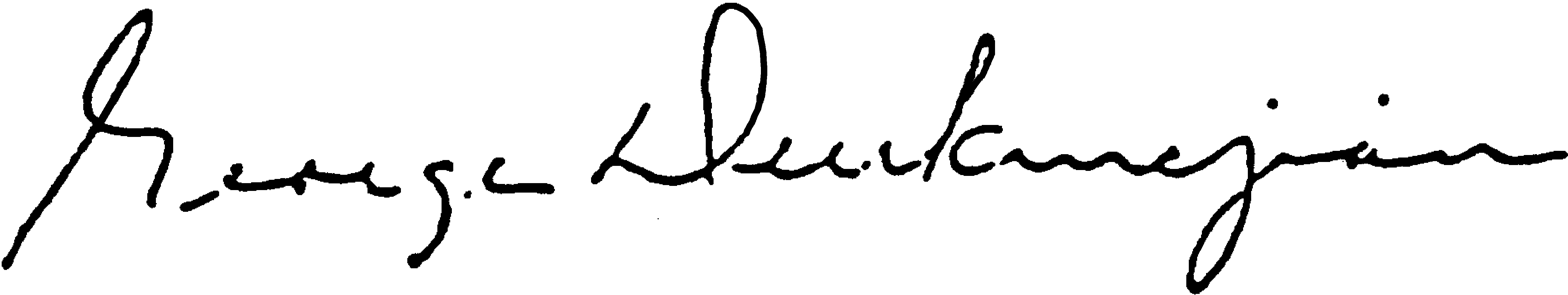
- Signature
- Nickname: "The Iron Duke"

Military service
- Allegiance: United States
- Branch/service: United States Army
- Years of service: 1953–1955
- Rank: Captain
- Unit: Army JAG Corps

Courken George Deukmejian Jr. (/djuːkˈmeɪdʒən/ dyook-MAY-jən; June 6, 1928 – May 8, 2018) was an American politician who served as the 35th governor of California from 1983 to 1991. A member of the Republican Party, he was the state's first governor of Armenian descent.

Born in New York, Deukmejian moved to California in 1955. He was elected to the State Assembly in 1962 to represent Long Beach. Four years later he was elected into the State Senate and later served as the Senate's minority leader. In 1970, Deukmejian unsuccessfully ran for Attorney General of California, finishing fourth in the Republican primary. In 1978 he secured the nomination and defeated Yvonne Brathwaite Burke to become the state's 27th attorney general. As attorney general, he led a veto override against Governor Jerry Brown, who had vetoed legislation to authorize the death penalty in the state.

After Governor Brown did not seek reelection in 1982, Deukmejian won the Republican nomination for governor and faced Los Angeles mayor Tom Bradley in the general election. Although opinion polls showed that Bradley had a favorable lead in the race, Deukmejian narrowly won the election outright. In 1986, Deukmejian defeated Bradley again for a much larger victory. As governor, Deukmejian made a name for being tough on crime, presenting himself to be in favor of "law and order". Under his administration, the California prison population nearly tripled, and he increased spending for the building of new prisons.

Deukmejian retired from front-line politics in 1991 and was succeeded as governor by fellow Republican Pete Wilson.

== Early life and education ==
Courken George Deukmejian Jr. was born on June 6, 1928, in Menands, New York. His parents were Armenians born in the Armenian highlands, who emigrated from the Ottoman Empire (present-day Turkey) to the United States in the early 1900s. His father, Courken George Deukmejian (Armenian: Կուրկէն Ժորժ Դէուքմեճեան), whose sister was killed during the Armenian Genocide, was a rug merchant born in Aintab (present-day Gaziantep). Deukmejian's mother, Alice Gairdan (Armenian: Ալիս Գայրդան Դյուքմեջյան), was born in Karin (present-day Erzurum); in the United States she worked for Montgomery Ward and later for New York State.

Deukmejian attended local schools. For college, he graduated in 1949 with a B.A. in sociology from Siena College. He earned a Juris Doctor (J.D.) from St. John's University in New York City in 1952. From 1953 to 1955, he served in the U.S. Army, assigned to the Judge Advocate General's Corps (JAG).

Deukmejian moved to California in 1955 where his sister, Anna Ashjian, was living and there was a large Armenian community. She introduced him to his future wife Gloria Saatjian, a bank teller whose parents were also immigrants from Armenia. They married on February 16, 1957. He and his wife had three children: two daughters, born in 1964 and 1969; and one son, born in 1966.

== Political career ==
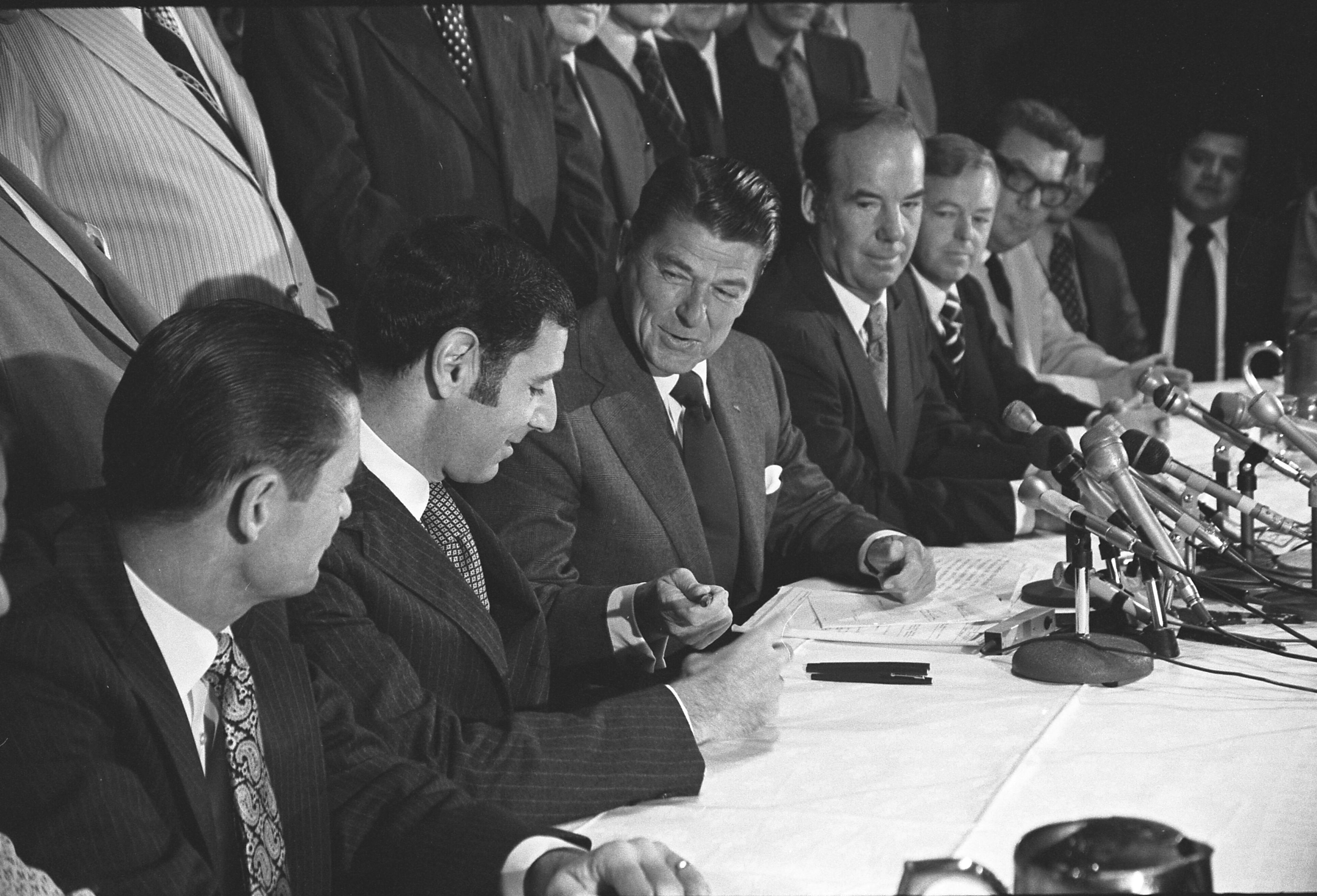
Deukmejian with Governor Ronald Reagan signing the 1973 California death penalty bill.

Deukmejian entered politics in California after a short period of private legal practice in Long Beach alongside Malcolm M. Lucas. In 1962, Deukmejian was elected to represent Long Beach in the State Assembly.

In 1966, he was elected as a state senator, serving from 1967 to 1979. He was a high-profile advocate for capital punishment. By 1969, he was the Majority Leader of the California State Senate.

He first ran for Attorney General of California in 1970, finishing fourth in the Republican primary. He won the election for Attorney General in 1978 and served from 1979 to 1983. During this time, he led a high-profile campaign against cannabis in northern California, which later became the Campaign Against Marijuana Planting. Additionally, he led a veto override against Governor Jerry Brown, who had vetoed legislation to authorize the death penalty.

== Governorship ==
Deukmejian was elected in 1982 to his first term as Governor of California. He first defeated Lieutenant Governor Mike Curb, a recording company owner, in the Republican primary. One of his early primary backers was former gubernatorial candidate Joe Shell of Bakersfield, a conservative who had opposed Richard M. Nixon in the 1962 California primary. Upon his victory, The New York Times reported,

The image that comes across of Mr. Deukmejian — a devoted family man, an Episcopal churchman, an ice cream lover — led one reporter to write, "California may have accidentally elected Iowa's Governor".

In the general election, Deukmejian ran as a conservative supporter of public safety and balanced budgets. In addition, he was strongly critical of outgoing Governor Jerry Brown and promised to run a very different administration. He strongly criticized the Supreme Court of California, which was dominated by Brown appointees, notably controversial Chief Justice Rose Bird.

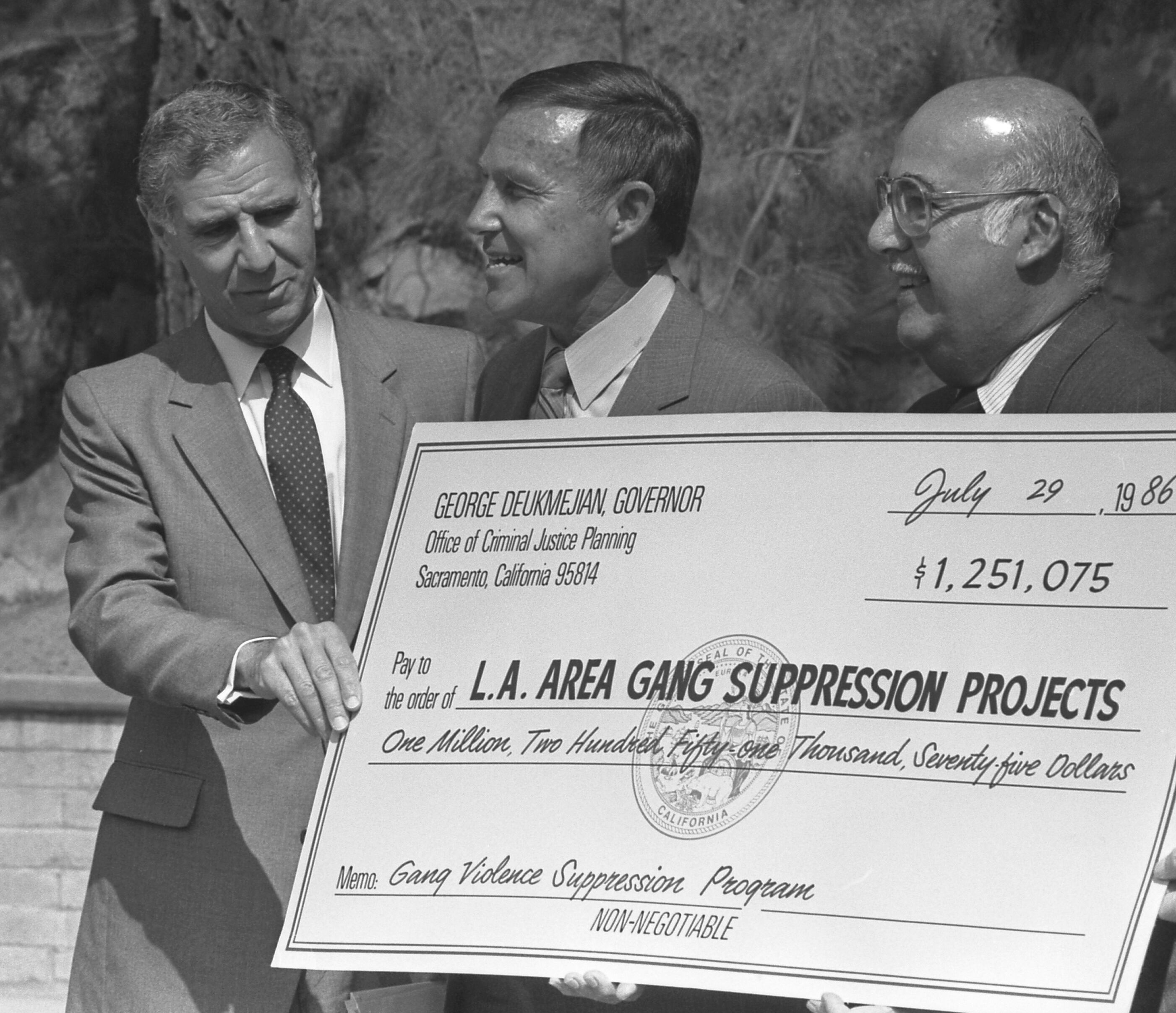
Deukmejian (left) with LAPD Chief Daryl Gates and County Sheriff Sherman Block, 1986.

Deukmejian narrowly defeated Los Angeles Mayor Tom Bradley in the general election. Deukmejian won the election by about 100,000 votes, about 1.2 percent of the 7.5 million votes cast. The victory came despite opinion polls leading up to the election that consistently showed Bradley with a lead, and despite exit polling conducted after voting closed that led some news organizations on the night of the election to make early projections of a Bradley victory. The discrepancy between the polling numbers and the election's ultimate results would come to be termed the "Bradley effect", which refers to a hypothesized tendency of white voters to tell interviewers or pollsters that they are undecided or likely to vote for a black candidate, but then actually vote for his opponent.

Deukmejian's governorship was a departure from that of his predecessor, Jerry Brown. He vowed not to raise taxes, later saying that he was "business friendly". In addition, he presented himself as a "law and order" candidate, proposing new efforts to fight crime. He faced a Democrat-dominated California State Legislature during his two terms as governor. He was the sole Republican statewide officeholder until Thomas W. Hayes was appointed California State Treasurer, following the death of Treasurer Jesse Unruh. In 1983, Deukmejian abolished the Caltrans Office of Bicycle Facilities and reduced state spending for bicycle projects from $5 million to the statutory minimum of $360,000 per year. In 1984, he vetoed A.B. 1, the first bill to ban discrimination against gays and lesbians, which passed the Legislature.

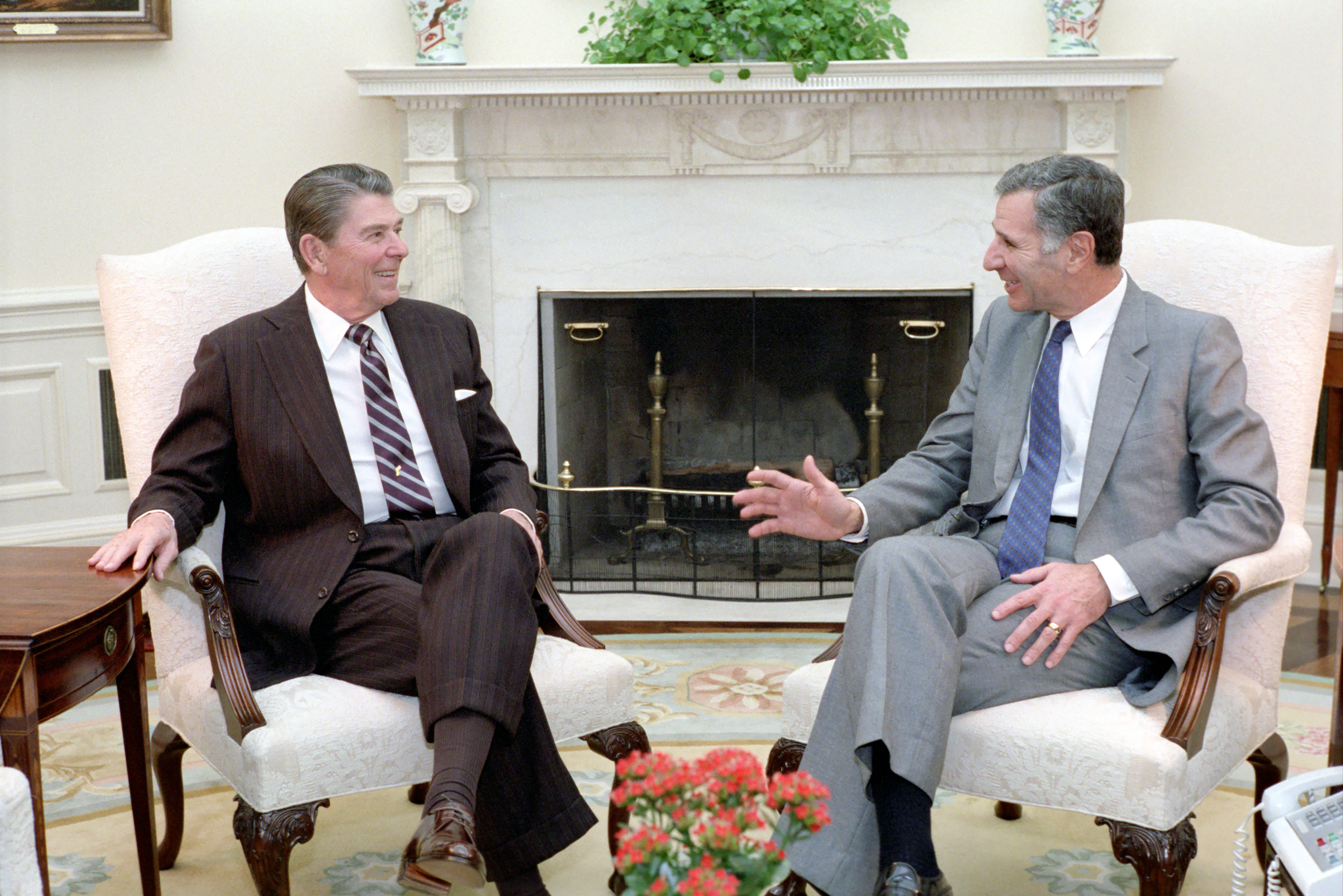
Deukmejian with President Ronald Reagan in the Oval Office, 1983

In 1986, Bradley sought a rematch, and Deukmejian defeated him by a 60% to 37% margin. He was generally regarded as a moderate-to-conservative Republican.

The Deukmejian administration began during a national economic recession. He halted the hiring of new state employees and banned out-of-state travel for those in government. He rejected the legislature's demands for tax hikes, and pared $1.1 billion from its budget by selectively vetoing spending items. One year later, further cuts, along with a nationwide economic rebound that benefited the state, created a billion dollar surplus for 1985. His 1985 budget slightly increased spending in highway construction, but cut deeply into the education, health, welfare and environmental budgets. For this he was roundly criticized, and the cuts probably led to his low polling numbers at the end of his tenure as governor. 3 years later, Deukmejian faced his own billion dollar deficit. He supported a raise in the state minimum wage in 1989. Deukmejian largely made his career by being tough on crime. When he was in the legislature, he wrote California's capital punishment law. As a candidate for re-election, in 1986 he opposed the retention election of three Brown-appointed justices of the Supreme Court of California due to their consistent opposition to the death penalty in any and all circumstances. The best known of these was Rose Bird, the first female Chief Justice of the Court (and the first one to be voted off). Deukmejian elevated his friend and law partner, Malcolm Lucas, from Associate Justice to Chief Justice, and appointed three new associate justices. Under Deukmejian, the California prison population nearly tripled — as of December 31, 1982, the total prison population stood at 34,640 inmates. He increased spending for the building of new prisons.

Never a fan of California OSHA, Deukmejian slashed almost all funding for the agency in 1987. His action was almost certainly illegal, as California OSHA was not a line item in the budget subject to the Governor's veto power, but he never had his day in court, as the people of California approved Proposition 97 in 1988 rejecting his action and reinstating funding for the agency.

In 1988, then-Vice President George H. W. Bush considered Deukmejian as a possible running mate for the presidential election that year. During a trade mission to South Korea in August, Deukmejian sent a letter saying he could not be considered for nomination, refusing to leave the governorship to Democratic Lieutenant Governor Leo T. McCarthy.

Deukmejian did not seek re-election to a third term as governor in the 1990 gubernatorial elections. The Republicans instead nominated sitting United States Senator Pete Wilson, who defeated Dianne Feinstein in the general election. He was the last governor not affected by the two-term limit that was passed by voters in 1990.

On October 1, 1989, Deukmejian signed legislation authorizing the purchasing of health insurance by uninsured Californians suffering from catastrophic serious illnesses, such as AIDS, cancer, diabetes, and heart disease, to be funded through tobacco tax revenues. In 1991, in his last days in office, he vetoed the property tax exemption bill that applied to companies building solar in California. This exemption was focused toward the Solar Energy Generating Systems (SEGS) plants then being built by Luz International Limited (Luz). The veto led to the bankruptcy of Luz.

== Post-governorship ==
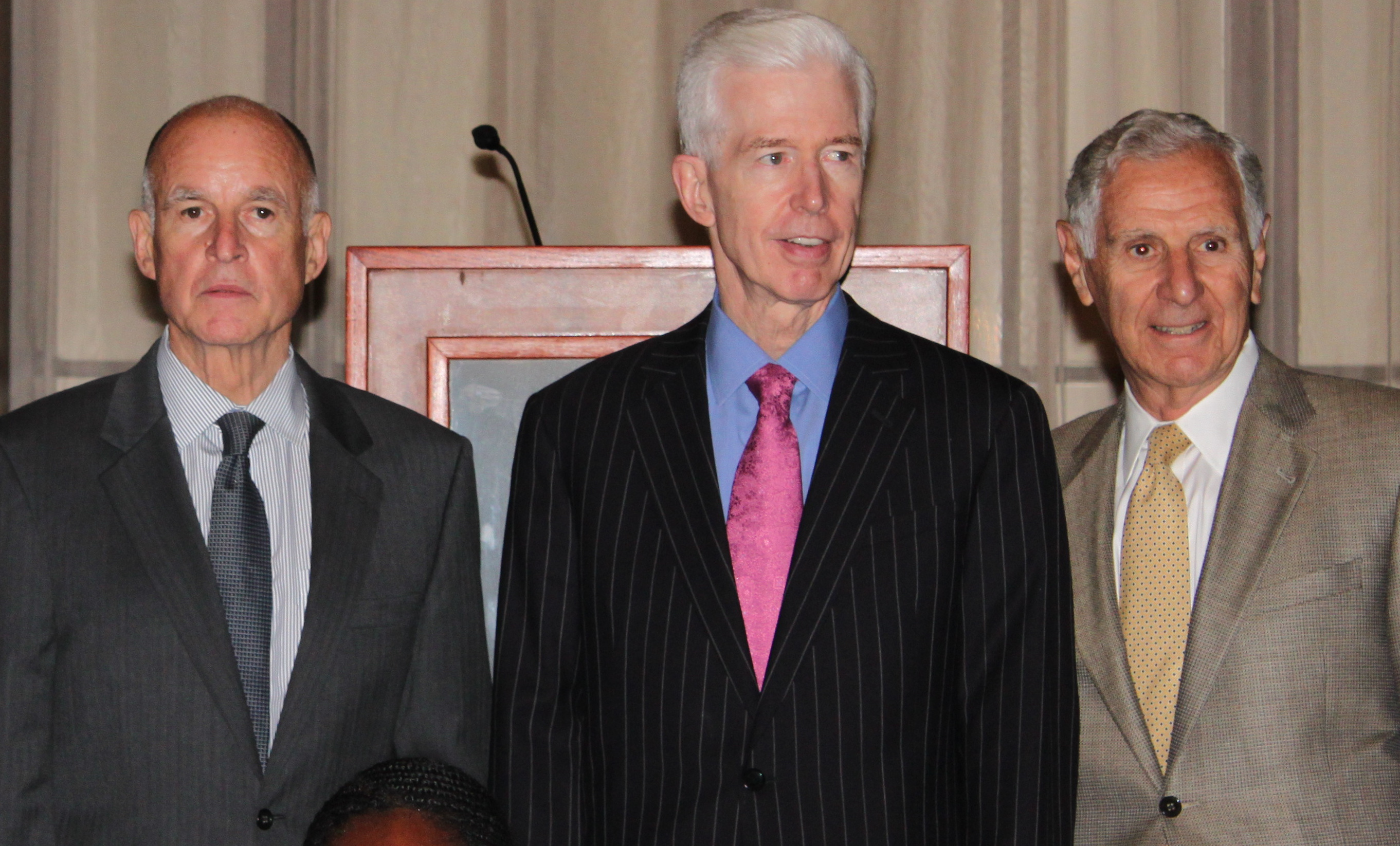
Jerry Brown (left), Gray Davis (center) and Deukmejian (right) in September 2010

Deukmejian was a partner in the law firm of Sidley & Austin from 1991 until 2000 when he retired. He reentered public life by serving on special committees, including one to reform the California penal system, and a charter-reform committee in his hometown of Long Beach. He oversaw a revamping of the UCLA Willed Body Program after a scandal involving the sale of human body parts donated for science. In 2013, a courthouse in Long Beach was named in his honor. Deukmejian received an honorary doctor of laws degree from California State University, Long Beach, in 2008, because of his support for education, state law, and Long Beach. In 2015, he was given the Key to the City of Long Beach.

== Death ==
Deukmejian died of natural causes at his home on May 8, 2018, at the age of 89. California Governor Jerry Brown said on Twitter: "George Deukmejian was a popular governor and made friends across the political aisle. Anne and I join all Californians in expressing our deepest condolences to his family and friends". He resided in the Belmont Park neighborhood of Long Beach for over 51 years. Throughout his adult life, he was a member of All Saints Episcopal Church in Long Beach.

California Assembly
Preceded by William Grant	Member of the California Assembly from the 39th district 1963–1967	Succeeded by James A. Hayes
California Senate
Preceded by Gordon Cologne	Member of the California Senate from the 31st district 1967–1977	Succeeded by Paul B. Carpenter
Preceded by James Q. Wedworth	Member of the California Senate from the 37th district 1977–1979	Succeeded by Ollie Speraw
Legal offices
Preceded by Evelle J. Younger	Attorney General of California; 1979–1983	Succeeded by John Van de Kamp
Party political offices
Preceded by Evelle J. Younger	Republican nominee for Governor of California; 1982, 1986	Succeeded by Pete Wilson
Political offices
Preceded by Jerry Brown	Governor of California; 1983–1991	Succeeded by Pete Wilson
