= Robert Philibosian =

American politician (1940–2023)

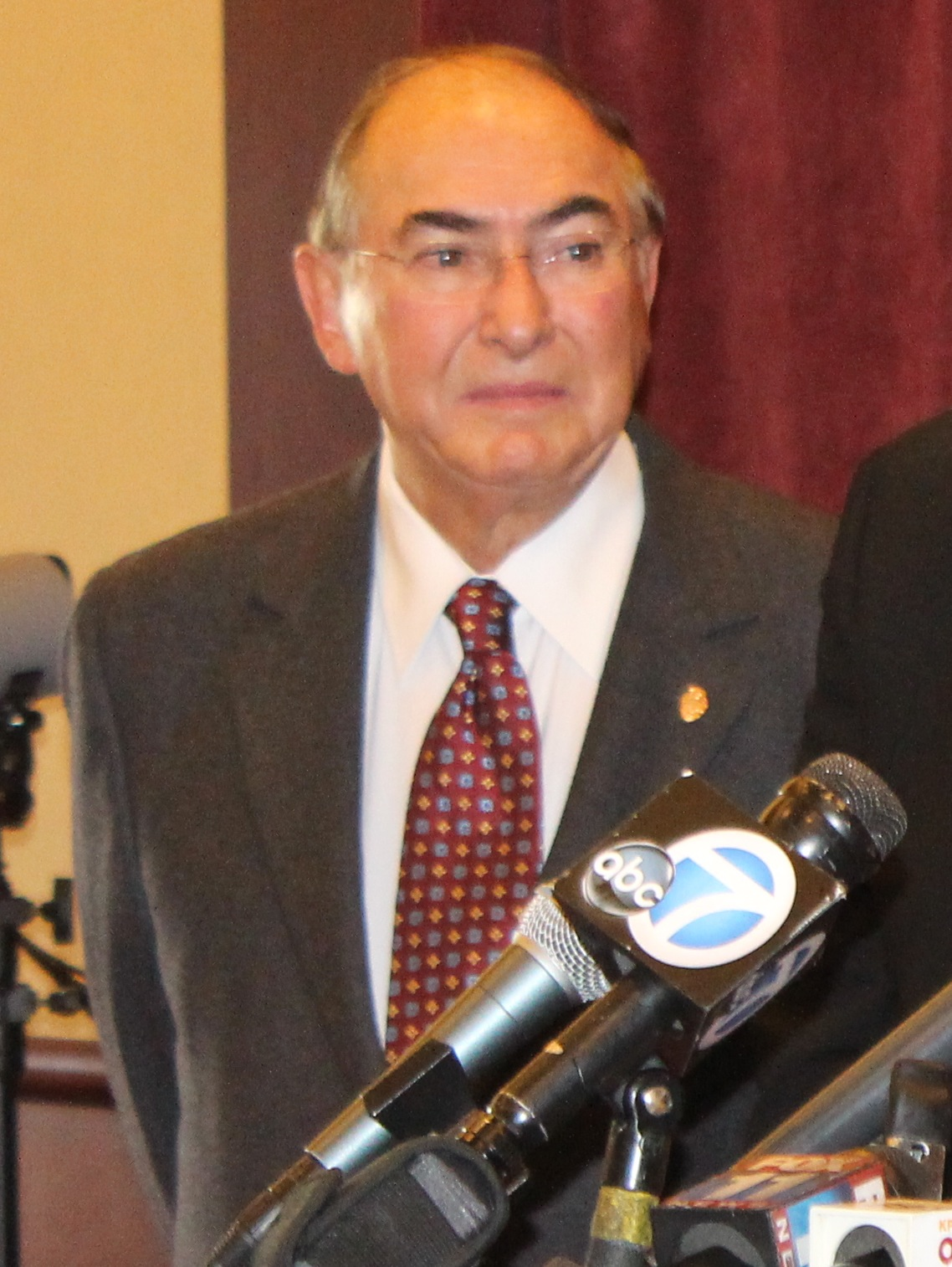
- Philibosian in 2012

38th District Attorney of Los Angeles County
- In office 1982–1984
- Preceded by: John Van de Kamp
- Succeeded by: Ira Reiner

Personal details
- Born: Robert Harry Philibosian; September 29, 1940 San Diego, California, U.S.
- Died: November 13, 2023 (aged 83)
- Party: Republican
- Spouse: Nancy Walsh
- Children: 2
- Education: Southwestern Law School; Stanford University

Robert Harry Philibosian (September 29, 1940 – November 13, 2023) was an American lawyer and politician. He was appointed Los Angeles County District Attorney in 1981 when his predecessor John Van de Kamp was elected Attorney General of California. Philibosian served as district attorney until 1984 when he was defeated in countywide election by Ira Reiner. He received his B.A. degree in history from Stanford University and his J.D. degree from Southwestern Law School, and was admitted to the California State Bar in 1968.

Philibosian is best known as the presiding District Attorney during the infamous McMartin preschool trial. One of the other prosecutors, Glenn Stevens, left the case in protest that other prosecutors had withheld evidence from the defense. Stevens accused Robert Philibosian, the deputy district attorney on the case, of lying and withholding evidence from the court and defense lawyers in order to keep the Buckeys in jail and prevent access to exonerating evidence. Philobosian was running a losing race to be re-elected at the time. Following his political career, he was of counsel at the law firm of Sheppard, Mullin, Richter & Hampton.

Philibosian died on November 13, 2023, at the age of 83.

Legal offices
Preceded by John Van de Kamp	Los Angeles County District Attorney; 1981–1984	Succeeded by Ira Reiner
