= California's 19th senatorial district =

American legislative district

California's 19th State Senate district
Current senator
Rosilicie Ochoa Bogh; R–Yucaipa
- Population (2010) • Voting age • Citizen voting age: 928,850; 697,445; 536,288
- Demographics: 42.19% White; 2.06% Black; 48.28% Latino; 5.85% Asian; 0.76% Native American; 0.26% Hawaiian/Pacific Islander; 0.22% other; 0.38% remainder of multiracial
- Registered voters: 491,053
- Registration: 45.70% Democratic; 24.67% Republican; 23.37% No party preference

California's 19th senatorial district is one of 40 California State Senate districts. It is currently represented by Republican Rosilicie Ochoa Bogh of Yucaipa.

== District profile ==
The district encompasses large parts of California's desert regions, including the High Desert, the outermost fringes of the Inland Empire and parts of the San Jacinto Valley and the Coachella Valley. Major cities include Apple Valley, Yucaipa, Hemet, and Palm Springs.

== Election results from statewide races ==
Year	Office	Results|-
2021	Recall	No 62.4 – 37.6%
2020	President	Biden 64.4 – 33.3%
2018	Governor	Newsom 60.7 – 39.3%
2018	Senator	Feinstein 53.1 – 46.9%
2016	President	Clinton 61.3 – 32.4%
2016	Senator	Harris 58.9 – 41.1%
2014	Governor	Brown 59.0 – 41.0%
2012	President	Obama 58.2 – 39.3%
2012	Senator	Feinstein 60.2 – 39.8%
2010	Governor	Whitman 50.3 – 44.7%
2010	Senator	Fiorina 50.6 – 44.5%
2008	President	Obama 55.6 – 42.5%
2006	Governor	Schwarzenegger 63.6 – 31.6%
2006	Senator	Feinstein 52.9 – 42.3%
2004	President	Bush 50.4 – 48.4%
2004	Senator	Boxer 51.7 – 44.1%
2003	Recall	Yes 62.7 – 37.3%
2003	Recall	Schwarzenegger 52.3 – 23.5%
2002	Governor	Simon 48.7 – 41.7%
2000	President	Gore 48.4 – 47.4%
2000	Senator	Feinstein 51.1 – 42.4%
1998	Governor	Davis 53.2 – 44.0%
1998	Senator	Fong 49.1 – 47.2%
1996	President	Clinton 45.2 – 43.2%
1994	Governor	Wilson 63.8 – 32.4%
1994	Senator	Huffington 51.8 – 38.8%
1992	President	Clinton 36.3 – 35.9%
1992	Senator	Herschensohn 50.9 – 40.0%
1992	Senator	Feinstein 46.4 – 45.8%

== List of senators representing the district ==
Due to redistricting, the 19th district has been moved around different parts of the state. The current iteration resulted from the 2021 redistricting by the California Citizens Redistricting Commission.

Senators	Party	Years served	Electoral history	Counties represented
John Lenahan (San Francisco)	Democratic	January 3, 1887 – January 7, 1889	Elected in 1886. [data missing]	San Francisco
J. W. Welch (San Francisco)	Democratic	January 7, 1889 – January 2, 1893	Elected in 1888. [data missing]	San Francisco
Thomas F. Mitchell (San Francisco)	Republican	January 2, 1893 – January 4, 1897	Elected in 1892. [data missing]	San Francisco
Lawrence J. Dwyer (San Francisco)	Democratic	January 4, 1897 – January 5, 1900	Elected in 1896. Resigned to become a member of the San Francisco Board of Supervisors.	San Francisco
Vacant		January 5, 1900 – January 1, 1901		San Francisco
Richard J. Welch (San Francisco)	Republican	January 1, 1901 – January 6, 1913	Elected in 1900. Re-elected in 1904. Re-elected in 1908. [data missing]	San Francisco
Edwin Grant (San Francisco)	Democratic	January 6, 1913 – October 8, 1914	Elected in 1912. Recalled from office.	San Francisco
Edward I. Wolfe (San Francisco)	Republican	October 8, 1914 – January 8, 1917	Elected to finish Grant's term. [data missing]	San Francisco
Lester G. Burnett (San Francisco)	Republican	January 8, 1917 – January 5, 1925	Elected in 1916. Re-elected in 1920. [data missing]	San Francisco
Tallant Tubbs (San Francisco)	Republican	January 5, 1925 – January 2, 1933	Elected in 1924. Re-elected in 1928. Retired to run for U.S. Senate.	San Francisco
J. M. Inman (Sacramento)	Republican	January 2, 1933 – September 6, 1934	Redistricted from the 7th district and re-elected in 1932. Resigned.	Sacramento
Vacant		September 6, 1934 – January 7, 1935		Sacramento
Thomas P. Scollan (Sacramento)	Independent	January 7, 1935 – January 4, 1937	Elected in 1934. [data missing]	Sacramento
Roy J. Nielsen (Sacramento)	Republican	January 4, 1937 – January 6, 1941	Elected in 1936. Lost re-election.	Sacramento
John H. Swan (Sacramento)	Democratic	January 6, 1941 – January 8, 1945	Elected in 1940. [data missing]	Sacramento
Earl D. Desmond (Sacramento)	Democratic	January 8, 1945 – May 28, 1958	Elected in 1944. Re-elected in 1948. Re-elected in 1952. Re-elected in 1956. Died.	Sacramento
Albert S. Rodda (Sacramento)	Democratic	January 5, 1959 – January 2, 1967	Elected in 1958. Re-elected in 1962. Redistricted to the 5th district.	Sacramento
H. L. Richardson (Glendora)	Republican	January 2, 1967 – November 30, 1976	Elected in 1966. Re-elected in 1970. Re-elected in 1974. Redistricted to the 25th district.	Los Angeles
Lou Cusanovich (Westlake Village)	Republican	December 6, 1976 – November 30, 1980	Redistricted from the 23rd district and re-elected in 1976. [data missing]	Los Angeles, Ventura
Edward M. Davis (Los Angeles)	Republican	December 1, 1980 – November 30, 1992	Elected in 1980. Re-elected in 1984. Re-elected in 1988. Retired.	Los Angeles, Ventura
Cathie Wright (Simi Valley)	Republican	December 7, 1992 – November 30, 2000	Elected in 1992. Re-elected in 1996. Termed out.	Los Angeles, Santa Barbara, Ventura
Tom McClintock (Elk Grove)	Republican	December 4, 2000 – November 30, 2008	Elected in 2000. Re-elected in 2004. Retired to run for U.S. House of Representatives.	Los Angeles, Ventura
Tony Strickland (Huntington Beach)	Republican	December 1, 2008 – November 30, 2012	Elected in 2008. Retired to run for U.S. House of Representatives.	Los Angeles, Ventura
Hannah-Beth Jackson (Santa Barbara)	Democratic	December 3, 2012 – November 30, 2020	Elected in 2012. Re-elected in 2016. Retired.	Los Angeles, Santa Barbara, Ventura
Monique Limón (Santa Barbara)	Democratic	December 7, 2020 – November 30, 2024	Elected in 2020. Redistricted to the 21st district.	Santa Barbara, Ventura
Rosilicie; Ochoa Bogh (Yucaipa)	Republican	December 2, 2024 – present	Redistricted from the 23rd district and re-elected in 2024.	Los Angeles, Riverside, San Bernardino

== Election results (1990-present) ==
=== 2024 ===
2024 California State Senate 19th district election
Primary election
Party	Candidate	Votes	%
Republican	Rosilicie Ochoa Bogh (incumbent)	101,118	53.8
Democratic	Lisa Middleton	86,975	46.2
Total votes		188,093	100.0
General election
Republican	Rosilicie Ochoa Bogh (incumbent)	209,739	54.8
Democratic	Lisa Middleton	173,291	45.2
Total votes		383,030	100.0
Republican gain from Democratic			

=== 2020 ===
2020 California State Senate 19th district election
Primary election
Party	Candidate	Votes	%
Democratic	Monique Limón	152,745	61.1
Republican	Gary Michaels	82,466	33.0
No party preference	Anastasia Stone	14,734	5.9
Total votes		249,945	100.0
General election
Democratic	Monique Limón	272,442	64.5
Republican	Gary Michaels	150,089	35.5
Total votes		422,531	100.0
Democratic hold			

=== 2016 ===
2016 California State Senate 19th district election
Primary election
Party	Candidate	Votes	%
Democratic	Hannah-Beth Jackson (incumbent)	144,422	64.1
Republican	Colin Patrick Walch	80,765	35.9
Total votes		225,187	100.0
General election
Democratic	Hannah-Beth Jackson (incumbent)	224,834	63.1
Republican	Colin Patrick Walch	131,598	37.3
Total votes		356,432	100.0
Democratic hold			

=== 2012 ===
2012 California State Senate 19th district election
Primary election
Party	Candidate	Votes	%
Republican	Mike Stoker	69,252	44.9
Democratic	Hannah-Beth Jackson	64,219	41.6
Democratic	Jason Hodge	20,828	13.5
Total votes		154,299	100.0
General election
Democratic	Hannah-Beth Jackson	180,780	55.7
Republican	Mike Stoker	143,819	44.3
Total votes		324,599	100.0
Democratic gain from Republican			

=== 2008 ===
2008 California State Senate 19th district election
Party	Candidate	Votes	%
Republican	Tony Strickland	207,976	50.2
Democratic	Hannah-Beth Jackson	207,119	49.8
Independent	Peter Winfield Diederich (write-in)	14	0.0
Total votes		415,109	100.0
Republican hold			

=== 2004 ===
2004 California State Senate 19th district election
Party	Candidate	Votes	%
Republican	Tom McClintock (incumbent)	233,365	60.8
Democratic	Paul Graber	151,085	39.2
Total votes		384,450	100.0
Republican hold			

=== 2000 ===
2000 California State Senate 19th district election
Party	Candidate	Votes	%
Republican	Tom McClintock	165,422	57.6
Democratic	Daniel R. Gonzalez	121,893	42.4
Total votes		287,315	100.0
Republican hold			

=== 1996 ===
1996 California State Senate 19th district election
Party	Candidate	Votes	%
Republican	Cathie Wright (incumbent)	160,130	62.2
Democratic	John Birke	97,133	37.8
Total votes		257,263	100.0
Republican hold			

=== 1992 ===
1992 California State Senate 19th district election
Party	Candidate	Votes	%
Republican	Cathie Wright	148,116	53.2
Democratic	Hank Starr	108,052	38.8
Libertarian	Richard N. Burns	11,483	4.1
Peace and Freedom	Charles Najbergier	10,569	3.8
Total votes		278,220	100.0
Republican hold			

== See also ==
- California State Senate
- California State Senate districts
- Districts in California
