= John Van de Kamp =

American politician

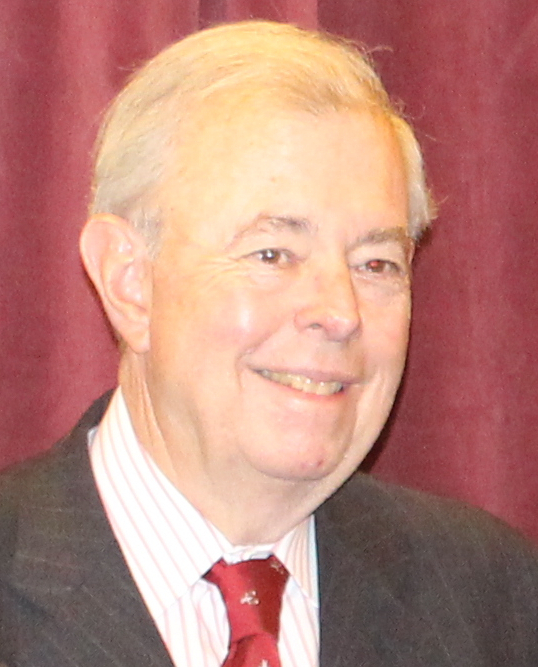
- Van de Kamp in 2012

28th Attorney General of California
- In office January 3, 1983 – January 7, 1991
- Governor: George Deukmejian
- Preceded by: George Deukmejian
- Succeeded by: Dan Lungren

37th Los Angeles County District Attorney
- In office July 1, 1975 – July 1, 1981
- Preceded by: Joseph P. Busch
- Succeeded by: Robert Philibosian

Personal details
- Born: John Kalar Van de Kamp; February 7, 1936 Pasadena, California, U.S.
- Died: March 14, 2017 (aged 81) Pasadena, California, U.S.
- Party: Democratic
- Spouse: Andrea Fisher
- Children: 1
- Education: Dartmouth College (A.B.); Stanford Law School (J.D.)

John Kalar Van de Kamp (February 7, 1936 – March 14, 2017) was an American politician and lawyer who served as Los Angeles County District Attorney from 1975 until 1981, and then as the 28th Attorney General of California from 1983 until 1991.

== Early life ==
A member of the Van de Kamp family, famous for its bakeries, frozen foods, and Lawry's Restaurants in Southern California, John Kalar Van de Kamp was born on February 7, 1936, in Pasadena, California. He graduated from John Muir High School in Pasadena, and went on to graduate from Dartmouth College and from Stanford Law School in 1959. He served as assistant U.S. Attorney and later became the first Federal Public Defender in Los Angeles. He was appointed U.S. Attorney for Los Angeles by President Lyndon Johnson in 1966. He was appointed district attorney after the previous incumbent died in office.

== Los Angeles County District Attorney ==
During his tenure as Los Angeles County District Attorney, Van de Kamp dramatically increased the number of female deputy district attorneys in the office. He also created special units to focus on gangs, sexual assault, domestic violence, child abuse, and career criminals, and a unit to monitor crime in the entertainment industry. He set in place programs to help victims and witnesses, as well as quick response teams in cases of police officer-involved shootings.

Van de Kamp was criticized for his office's handling of the Hillside Strangler case. Specifically, the case against defendant Angelo Buono was based largely on the testimony of co-defendant Kenneth Bianchi, who became uncooperative and unreliable, claiming to have multiple personalities and repeatedly changing his story. Van de Kamp was assured by his prosecutors that because of Bianchi's behavior, conviction of Buono could not be secured. Van de Kamp accepted their judgment and allowed the trial prosecutor, Roger Kelly, to move to dismiss all 10 murder charges against Buono and release him with an eye toward trying him for pandering.

However, the judge in the case, Ronald M. George, felt enough evidence existed against Buono to justify proceeding to trial, and George took the unusual step of denying the motion to dismiss. Van de Kamp then declared a conflict of interest with regard to his office continuing the prosecution, as his office had already come to the conclusion that they could not win the case. Judge George accepted the conflict and reassigned the case, moving it to the California Attorney General's office under George Deukmejian. The prosecutors from the Attorney General's office were able to overcome the problems with Bianchi's behavior, and went on to secure convictions on nine of the 10 counts and a life sentence against Buono.

The trial had been so lengthy that before it ended, Deukmejian had left office (having been elected as Governor of California), and had been succeeded as California Attorney General by Van de Kamp himself. Thus, it was ironically a Van de Kamp-led office that had declared the case against Buono to be unwinnable, and another Van de Kamp-led office that completed the winning of that case. The first decision, to give up on the murder prosecution of Buono, was used against Van de Kamp in later political campaigns to portray him as being "soft on crime".

== California Attorney General ==
Van de Kamp as California Attorney General.

Van de Kamp won the 1982 Democratic primary for Attorney General, defeating California State Sen. Omer Rains, a Democrat from Santa Barbara. Rains was chair of the Senate Judiciary Committee and former Senate Majority Leader. Van de Kamp would go on to beat the Republican candidate, Senior Assistant Attorney General George Nicholson, a Deukmejian lieutenant, in the November general election.

During Van de Kamp's administration as California Attorney General, he helped to create the Public Rights Division, which focuses on the enforcement of environmental, consumer protection, antitrust, and civil rights issues. He also helped to modernize the Department of Justice by beginning support of DNA forensic investigation. Van de Kamp, who was Catholic, personally opposed abortion and capital punishment, but as attorney general, his office enforced California's abortion rights and sought the death penalty at applicable criminal trials.

Van de Kamp was easily re-elected in 1986, winning 65 percent of the vote. The Republican nominee was San Fernando Valley attorney Bruce Gleason.

In 1987, Van de Kamp unsuccessfully led the State's charge against pornography by defending the pandering conviction of adult filmmaker Harold Freeman. Ultimately, the California State Supreme Court overturned Freeman's conviction. Van de Kamp appealed to the United States Supreme Court, who declined to hear the case, thus effectively legalizing the production of adult films. In February 1989, he brought an AK-47 assault rifle to a legislative hearing on gun control and told the lawmakers that he could kill them all in the time it took to utter a sentence. “You are lucky that I am the attorney general and not a nut,” he said.

In 1989, George Deukmejian announced that he would not seek a third term as Governor of California. Van de Kamp ran for the office in 1990, hoping to succeed Deukmejian a second time, but he lost the Democratic primary election to former San Francisco Mayor Dianne Feinstein. Feinstein lost the general election to U.S. Senator Pete Wilson, R-Calif. Feinstein would win a 1992 special election to fill Wilson's U.S. Senate seat.

== Post-politics ==
After his loss to Feinstein, Van de Kamp retired from politics and with his wife returned to his hometown of Pasadena, California, where they lived until his death in March 2017. After leaving public office, Van de Kamp entered a private law practice and remained active in environmental causes.

In 1977, Van de Kamp was awarded an honorary Doctor of Laws (LL.D.) degree from Whittier College.

Van de Kamp was elected the 80th president of the State Bar of California for 2004–2005. He also served as president of the board of directors for the Planning and Conservation League.

In 2016, along with Ron Briggs, Van de Kamp sued to overturn Proposition 66, a state constitutional amendment that sped up the death penalty process. He lost his lawsuit 5–2 in the California Supreme Court.

== Personal life and death ==
John Van de Kamp and his wife, Andrea (née Fisher), had a daughter. He died at his home in Pasadena on March 14, 2017, at the age of 81.

Legal offices
Preceded by Joseph P. Busch	Los Angeles County District Attorney; 1975–1981	Succeeded by Robert Philibosian
Preceded by George Deukmejian	California Attorney General; 1983–1991	Succeeded by Dan Lungren
