= Ollie Speraw =

American politician

Member of the California Senate from the 31st district
- In office April 26, 1979 - November 30, 1984
- Preceded by: George Deukmejian
- Succeeded by: William Campbell

Personal details
- Born: March 26, 1921 Minneapolis, Minnesota, U.S.
- Died: February 21, 2014 (aged 92) Carlsbad, California, U.S.
- Party: Republican
- Spouse(s): Marguerite Halicus; Carolyn Cook; Kathleen Norris; Anne Wormser
- Children: 4

Military service
- Branch/service: United States Air Force
- Battles/wars: World War II

Oliver Wagner Speraw (March 26, 1921 – February 21, 2014) served in the California State Senate for the 31st district from 1979 to 1984, and during World War II he served in the United States Army Air Force.
