= Edward M. Davis =

American politician and police chief (1916–2006)

Ed Davis
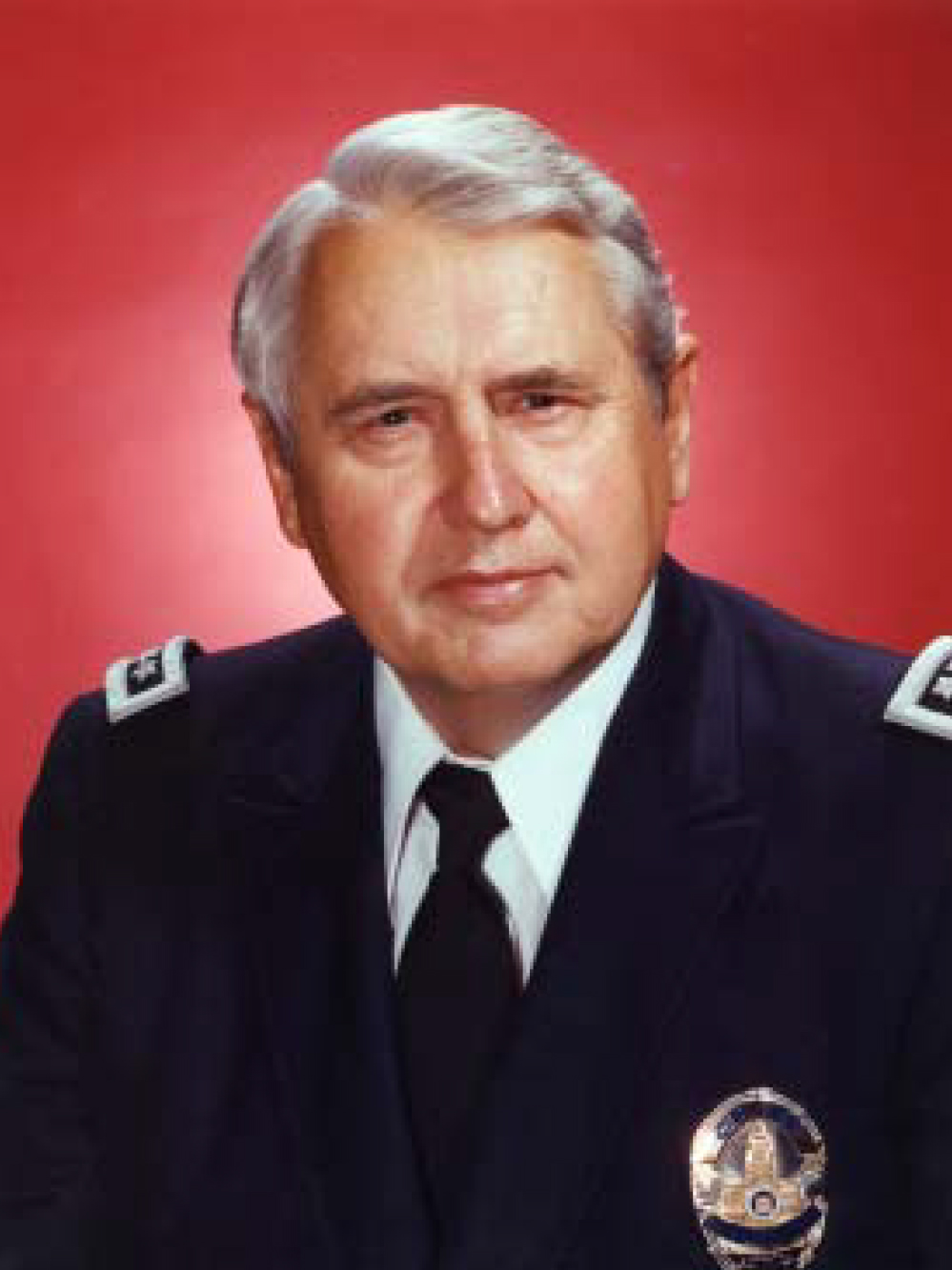

Member of the California Senate from the 19th district
- In office December 1, 1980 – November 30, 1992
- Preceded by: Lou Cusanovich
- Succeeded by: Cathie Wright

Personal details
- Born: November 15, 1916 Los Angeles, California, U.S.
- Died: April 22, 2006 (aged 89) San Luis Obispo, California, U.S.
- Party: Republican
- Police career
- Country: United States
- Department: Los Angeles Police Department
- Service years: 1948–1978
- Rank: Chief of Police

Edward Michael Davis (November 15, 1916 – April 22, 2006) was the chief of the Los Angeles Police Department from 1969 to 1978, and later a California state senator from 1980 to 1992 and an unsuccessful Republican candidate for the United States Senate in 1986. Davis' name was familiar to a generation of Americans since it appeared on its own card for "technical advice" in the closing credits of the popular television programs Dragnet (1967–70) and Adam-12 (1968–75).

== Family ==
Born in Los Angeles to James Leonard Davis and Lillian Fox Davis, Davis graduated from John C. Fremont High School in Los Angeles. He joined the LAPD and married Virginia Osborne in 1940. During World War II he took a leave of absence from the police department in order to serve in the United States Navy.

== Police career ==
When he became Chief of Police, Davis inherited a police department that was essentially the creation of Chief William H. Parker.

He instantly became well known internationally in 1969 when he held a press conference announcing the arrests of Charles Manson and his followers for what are known as the Tate–LaBianca murders. His role is well-documented in the book Helter Skelter, written by Vincent Bugliosi, the prosecutor in the case.

As the power and numbers of street gangs increased, the community of Los Angeles became the victim of increasing escalations of violence, intimidation, and other felonies. In response, Davis escalated police responses, authorizing the use of Terry stops, large raids on gang strongholds, created the infamous anti-gang unit C.R.A.S.H, and increasingly forceful and violent means of securing suspects such as chokeholds during arrests. Although the chokeholds were less violent than older methods of beating recalcitrant suspects, they were also more forceful and were often applied until the suspect passed out. By the time the policy was halted in May 1982 by the Police Commission, 15 people had died. In the case of City of Los Angeles v. Lyons, the Supreme Court blocked a lawsuit seeking an injunction to halt the practice permanently, because Adolph Lyons could not prove that there was a substantial and immediate likelihood that he personally would be choked again.

Davis increased resources toward monitoring and investigating political circles and simultaneously attempted to squash vice. In 1972, Hayden White, acting as sole plaintiff, brought suit against Davis, alleging the illegal expenditure of public funds in connection with covert intelligence gathering by police at the University of California, Los Angeles. The covert activities included police officers registering as students, taking notes of discussions occurring in classes, and making police reports on these discussions. In the resulting case, White v. Davis, the Supreme Court found for White in a unanimous decision and set the standard that determines the limits of legal police surveillance of political activity in California; police cannot engage in such surveillance in the absence of reasonable suspicion of a crime.

Under Davis, the LAPD and its vice squad were known for active policing against homosexuals. Zealous officers are purported to have dangled a youth over a cliff to try to make him reveal names of a pedophile ring. On April 10, 1976, over a hundred officers, with Davis present, raided a charitable "slave auction" event and bragged to reporters that they had freed the slaves. Dozens of men were detained on charges of violating an 1899 anti-slavery statute, but the expensive raid was criticized by the city council and no one was convicted. In 1975, Davis declined an invitation from Christopher Street West to attend Los Angeles' gay pride celebration, saying that he would prefer to support conversion therapy instead.

Davis was often known for some of his colorful language. For instance, in one of his most famous off-the-cuff news comments, Davis said, in 1972, concerning airline hijackers: "I recommend we have a portable gallows, and after we have the death penalty back in, we conduct a rapid trial for a hijacker before the Supreme Court out there, and hang him with due process out there at the airport."

== Politics ==
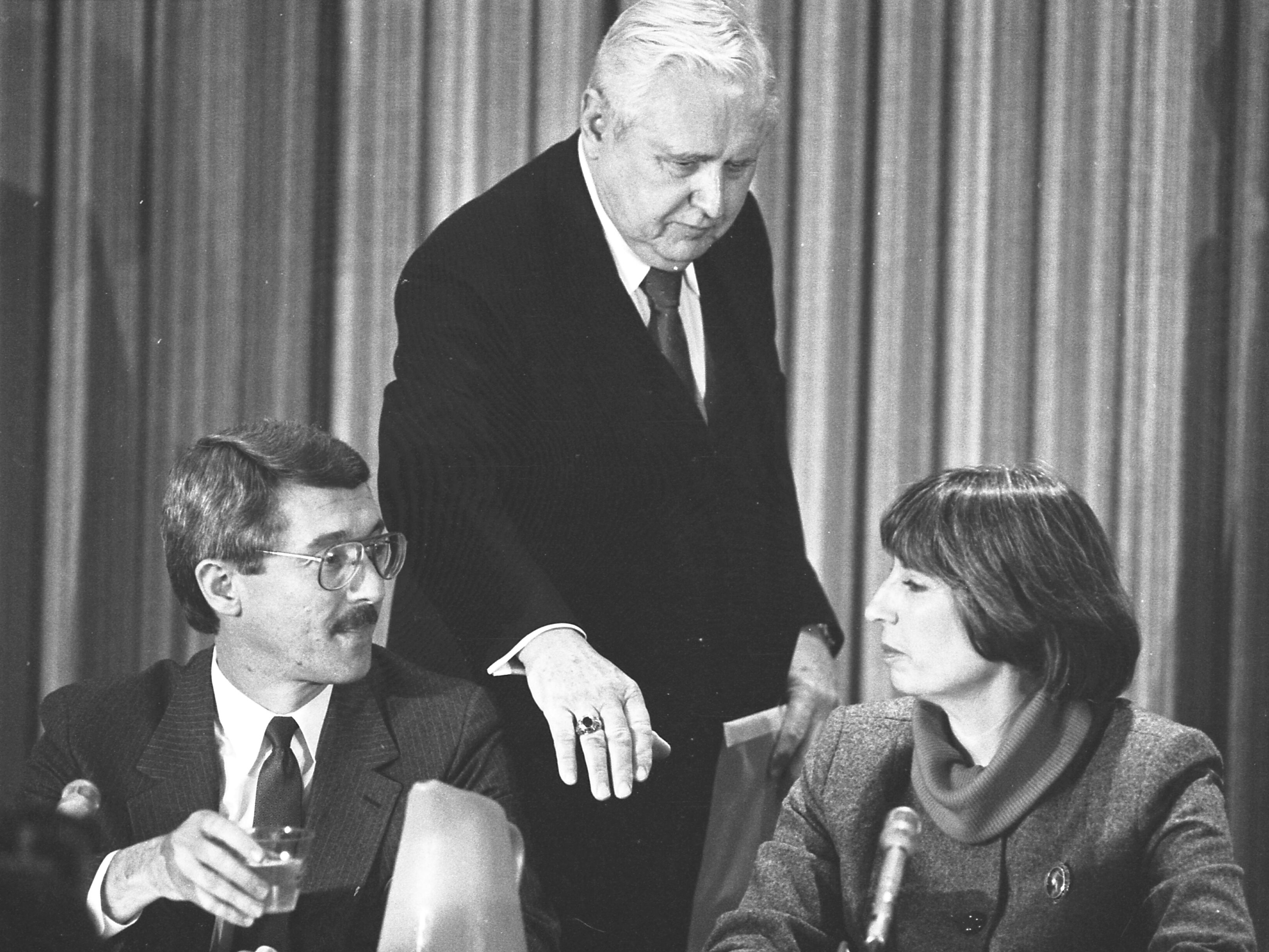
Davis with Assemblyman Robert W. Naylor and Congresswoman Bobbi Fiedler as Fiedler refuses to shake his hand, 1986.

Davis retired from law enforcement in 1978 to run for Governor of California but lost the Republican nomination to then state Attorney General Evelle Younger.

In the 1980 primary he defeated assemblyman Bob Cline for the Republican nomination and was eventually elected to the California State Senate. He would serve for 12 years (during the first two years of which Tom McClintock served as his chief of staff). Davis lost a bid in the 1986 California primary for the United States Senate. In contrast to his earlier policy of investigating the homosexual movement, as a senator, he supported a statewide homosexual rights protection bill. He also became a vocal environmentalist in his later years.

In 1992, when he decided to retire from the California State Senate, he went out of his way to recruit former State Assemblywoman Marion W. La Follette to run for his seat. This despite the fact that the current assemblywoman, Cathie Wright, had already declared for the seat.

== Later life ==
The last TV interview with Davis was taped in March 2002, where he recalled his years as LAPD chief and described the values and traits necessary to be a successful police chief. He also related his impressions of a young LAPD lieutenant named Bernard Parks who went on to become chief, and described how he implemented the community policing program during his administration.

Ed Davis died from pneumonia, on April 22, 2006, in San Luis Obispo, California. He was 89. At the time of his death, Davis was survived by his second wife, Bobbie Nash Davis; three children from his first marriage to Virginia Osborne, a son, Michael Edward Davis, a Los Angeles County deputy district attorney, and two daughters, Mary Ellen Burde and Christine Coey; four stepchildren; and 10 grandchildren.

Police appointments
Preceded by Roger E. Murdock	Chief of LAPD; 1969–1978	Succeeded by Robert F. Rock
California Senate
Preceded by Lou Cusanovich	California State Senator; 19th District; 1980–1992	Succeeded by Cathie Wright
