= 1986 California Attorney General election =

- November 4, 1986

Nominee	John Van de Kamp	Bruce Gleason
Party	Democratic	Republican
Popular vote	4,691,142	2,118,627
Percentage	66.0%	29.8%
- County results Van de Kamp: 50–60% 60–70% 70–80% 80–90%
Attorney General before election
John Van de Kamp
Democratic
Elected Attorney General
John Van de Kamp
Democratic

The 1986 California Attorney General election was held on November 4, 1986. Democratic incumbent John Van de Kamp defeated Republican nominee Bruce Gleason with 65.99% of the vote.

== General election ==
=== Candidates ===
Major party candidates

- John Van de Kamp, Democratic
- Bruce Gleason, Republican

Other candidates

- Carol L. Newman, Libertarian
- Robert J. Evans, Peace and Freedom
- Gary R. Odom, American Independent

=== Results ===
1986 California Attorney General election
Party	Candidate	Votes	%	±%
Democratic	John Van de Kamp	4,691,142	65.99%	
Republican	Bruce Gleason	2,118,627	29.80%	
Libertarian	Carol L. Newman	128,906	1.81%	
Peace and Freedom	Robert J. Evans	88,739	1.25%	
American Independent	Gary R. Odom	81,262	1.14%	
Majority		2,572,515		
Turnout		7,108,676		
Democratic hold		Swing		
