= Lou Cusanovich =

American politician and member of California State Assembly

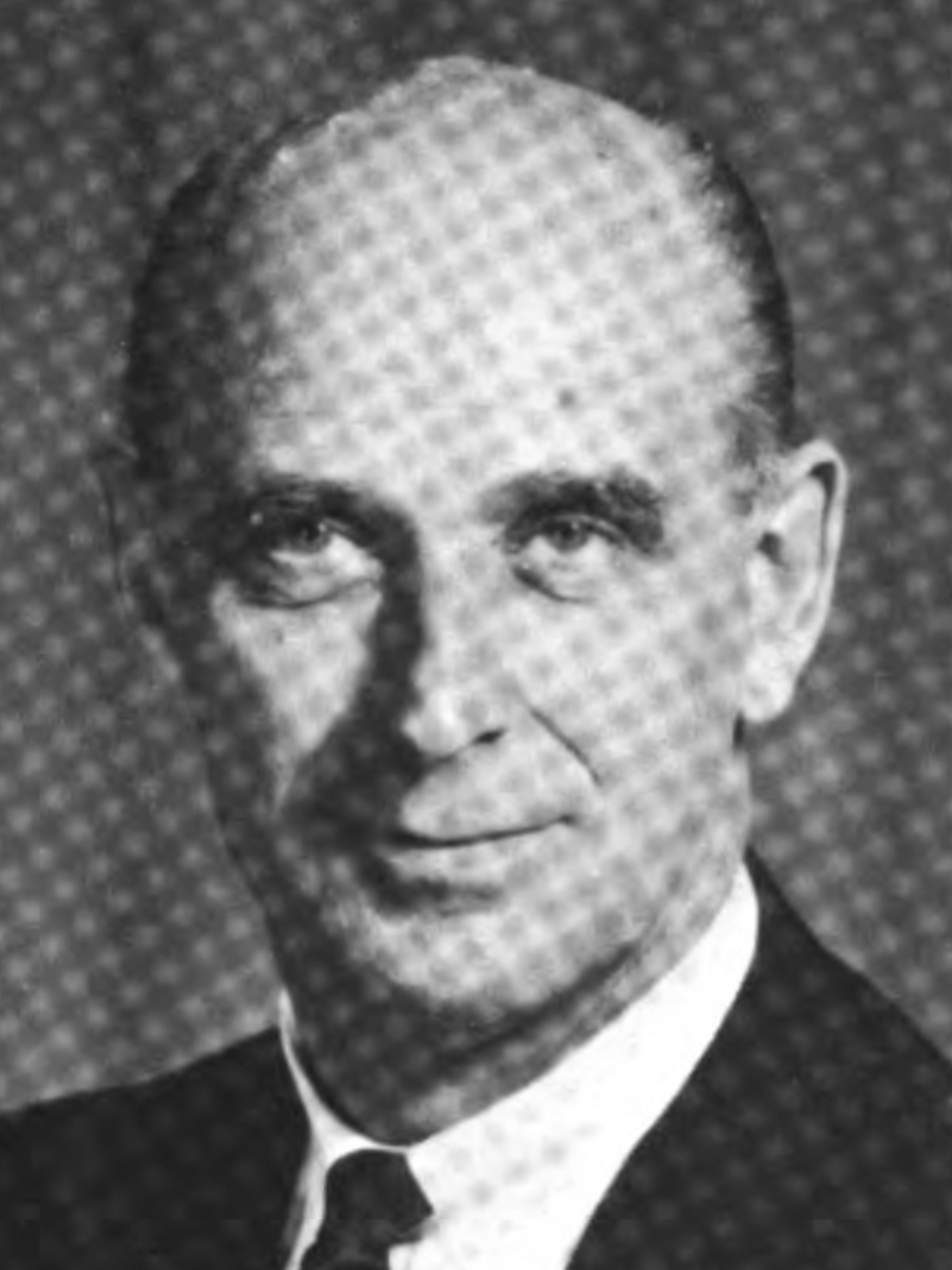
- Official portrait, 1971

Member of the California State Senate
- In office January 2, 1967 – December 1, 1980
- Preceded by: Donald L. Grunsky
- Succeeded by: Edward M. Davis
- Constituency: 23rd district (1967–1976); 19th district (1976–1980)

Member of the California State Assembly from the 64th district
- In office December 17, 1957 – January 2, 1967
- Preceded by: Patrick D. McGee
- Succeeded by: Patrick D. McGee

Personal details
- Born: June 14, 1912 Los Angeles, California, U.S.
- Died: February 6, 1985 (aged 72)
- Party: Republican
- Spouse: Elizabeth McElroy
- Children: 2, Michael and Gerald

Lou Cusanovich (June 14, 1912 – February 6, 1985) was an American politician who was a member of the California State Assembly from 1957 to 1966 and a member of the California State Senate from 1966 to 1980.

== Career ==
Cusanovich represented the San Fernando Valley in the California State Legislature for 23 years. He was a member of the Republican Party. In 1970, he served as the Majority Leader of the California State Senate.
