= Kenneth L. Maddy =

American politician (1934–2000)

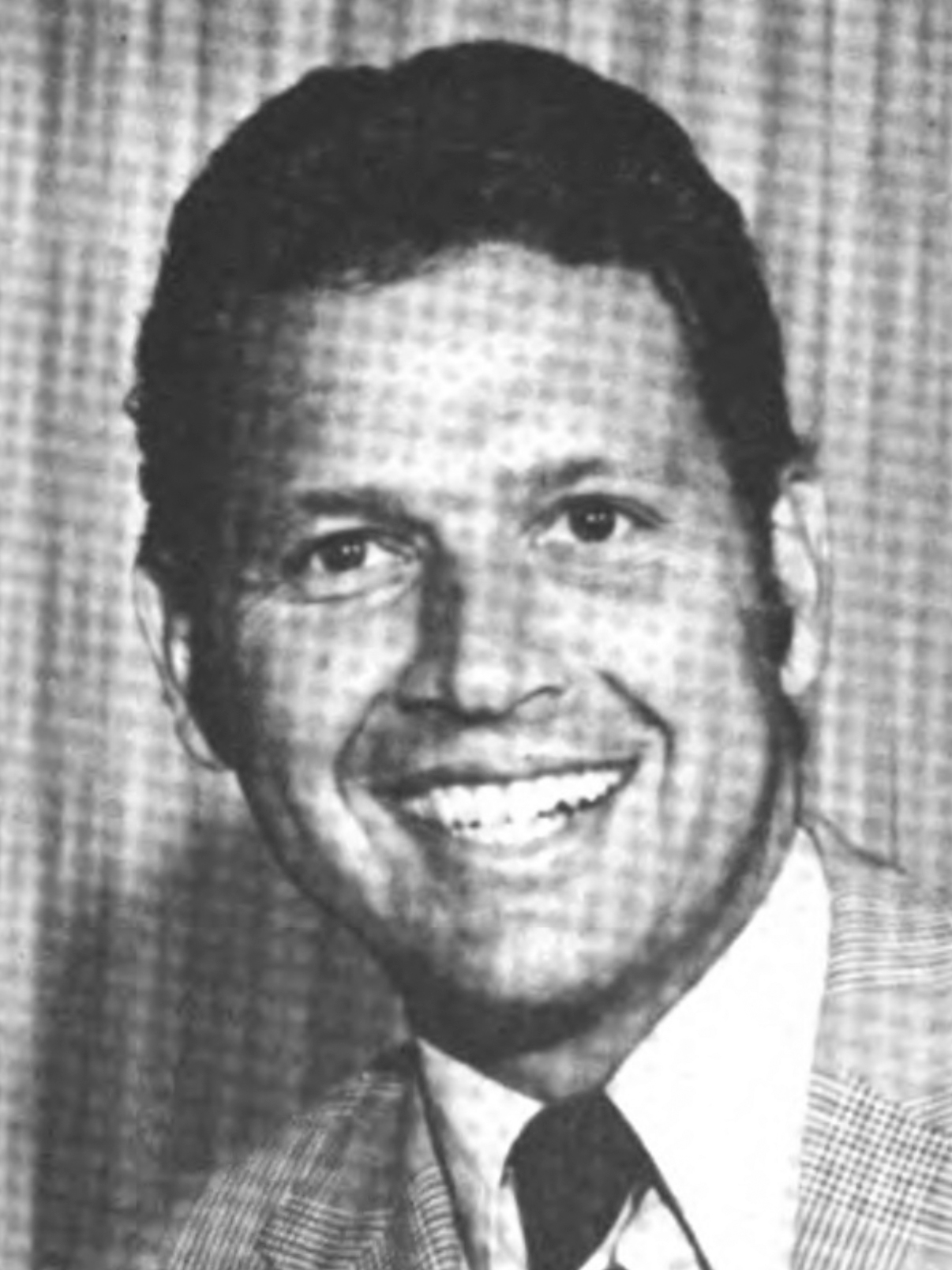
- Official portrait, 1975

Member of the California Senate from the 14th district
- In office June 26, 1979 – November 30, 1998
- Preceded by: George Zenovich
- Succeeded by: Chuck Poochigian

Member of the California State Assembly from the 30th district
- In office December 2, 1974 – November 30, 1978
- Preceded by: John E. Thurman
- Succeeded by: Jim Costa

Member of the California State Assembly from the 32nd district
- In office January 4, 1971 – November 30, 1974
- Preceded by: George Zenovich
- Succeeded by: Gordon W. Duffy

Personal details
- Born: May 22, 1934 Santa Monica, California
- Died: February 19, 2000 (aged 65) Sacramento, California
- Party: Republican
- Spouse(s): Beverly Chinello; Norma Foster
- Children: 3

Military service
- Branch/service: United States Air Force

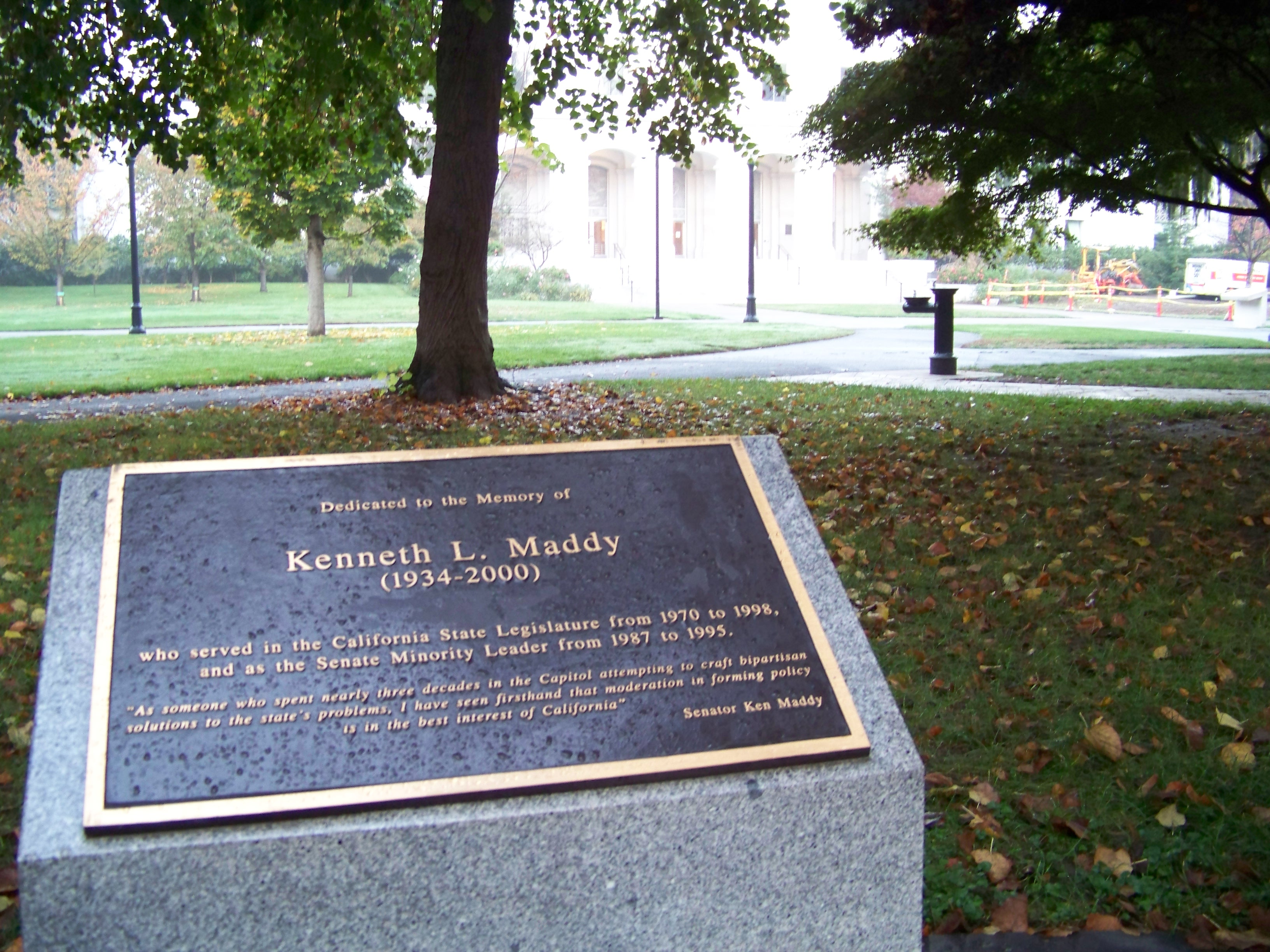
Kenneth L. Maddy memoriam located in Capitol Park in Sacramento, California

Kenneth Leon Maddy (May 22, 1934 – February 19, 2000) was a Republican member of the California State Assembly and State Senate from Fresno.

Maddy was born in Santa Monica. He attended Fresno State College and graduated in 1957 with a Bachelor of Science degree in agriculture. He served in the State Assembly for Fresno County from 1971 to 1978. Maddy ran unsuccessfully for governor in the 1978 Republican primary, having finished in third place with 484,583 votes (19.2 percent). The nomination went to state Attorney General Evelle J. Younger, but he was defeated by the Democratic governor Edmund G. "Jerry" Brown, Jr., in the general election. Maddy was then elected to the State Senate in a 1979 special election, serving there until 1998. He was the chairman for the Senate Republican Caucus from 1979 to 1983 and was the Republican leader of the Senate from 1987 to 1995.

== Legacy ==
- Kenneth L. Maddy Institute, Department of Political Science, California State University-Fresno
- Kenneth L. Maddy Equine Analytical Chemistry Laboratory, School of Veterinary Medicine, University of California, Davis
- Sacramento Area Youth Golf (SAY Golf), Freeport Boulevard, Sacramento
- Cal State Fresno created the Maddy Institute to help and inspire college students to work in public service.
- The Oak Tree Racing Association named a stakes race in his honor in 2000. Taking place at the Santa Anita Park, it’s now known as the Senator Ken Maddy Handicap, previously called the Autumn Days Handicap.
- The University of California, Davis is home to an equine drug testing laboratory named after Maddy. This lab is a joint venture between the Veterinary Medical School and the California Department of Food and Agriculture's Animal Health and Food Safety Laboratory.

California Assembly
Preceded by George Zenovich	California State Assemblyman, 32nd District; January 4, 1971 - November 30, 1974	Succeeded by Gordon W. Duffy
Preceded by John E. Thurman	California State Assemblyman, 30th District; December 2, 1974 – November 30, 1978	Succeeded by Jim Costa
