= Joseph P. Busch =

36th District Attorney of Los Angeles County

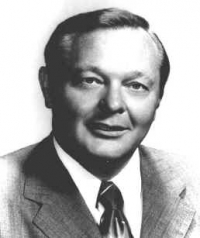

36th District Attorney of Los Angeles County
- In office January 4, 1971 – June 27, 1975
- Preceded by: Evelle J. Younger
- Succeeded by: John Van de Kamp

Personal details
- Born: February 12, 1926 Chicago, Illinois
- Died: June 27, 1975 (49 years old)
- Spouse: Jennie Roasio
- Education: University of Texas (BA); Loyola Law School

Joseph P. Busch (February 12, 1926 – June 27, 1975) was an American politician who served as the 36th Los Angeles County District Attorney.

== Professional life and career ==
He attended the University of Texas in 1947, where he obtained his Bachelor of Arts, and also went to Loyola Law School. He entered as District attorney in 1970 after U.S. District Judge A. Andrew Hauk turned the job down.

== In office and later life ==
For almost 20 years, Busch had been with the District Attorney's Office when he was chosen for the top job. He joined as a deputy district attorney in 1952, and served as director of special operations, assistant district attorney and chief deputy district attorney. Following the resignation of Evelle J. Younger to become Attorney General of California in 1971, he became District Attorney. He won the job outright in a 1972 election in a close election over prosecutor Vincent Bugliosi.

Six new branch offices were created by Busch and he instituted the Organized Crime and Pornography Division, Consumer and Environmental Protection Division and Bureau of Community Affairs, among others.

He died in his sleep at the age of 49 at his West Covina, California home; it was believed that came from natural causes.

== Personal life ==
Busch was married to Jennie Roasio, and also he had three sons, Joseph, Steven and David.
