= Robert F. Rock =

Los Angeles police chief in 1978

- Predecessor: Edward M. Davis
- Successor: Daryl F. Gates
- Police career
- Department: Los Angeles Police Department
- Rank: Interim Chief of Police

Robert F. Rock was appointed as interim chief of the Los Angeles Police Department from January 16, 1978, to March 28, 1978, between the administrations of Edward M. Davis and Daryl F. Gates.

Police appointments
Preceded by Edward M. Davis	Chief of LAPD; 1978	Succeeded by Daryl F. Gates
