= Thomas C. Lynch =

American politician (1904–1986)

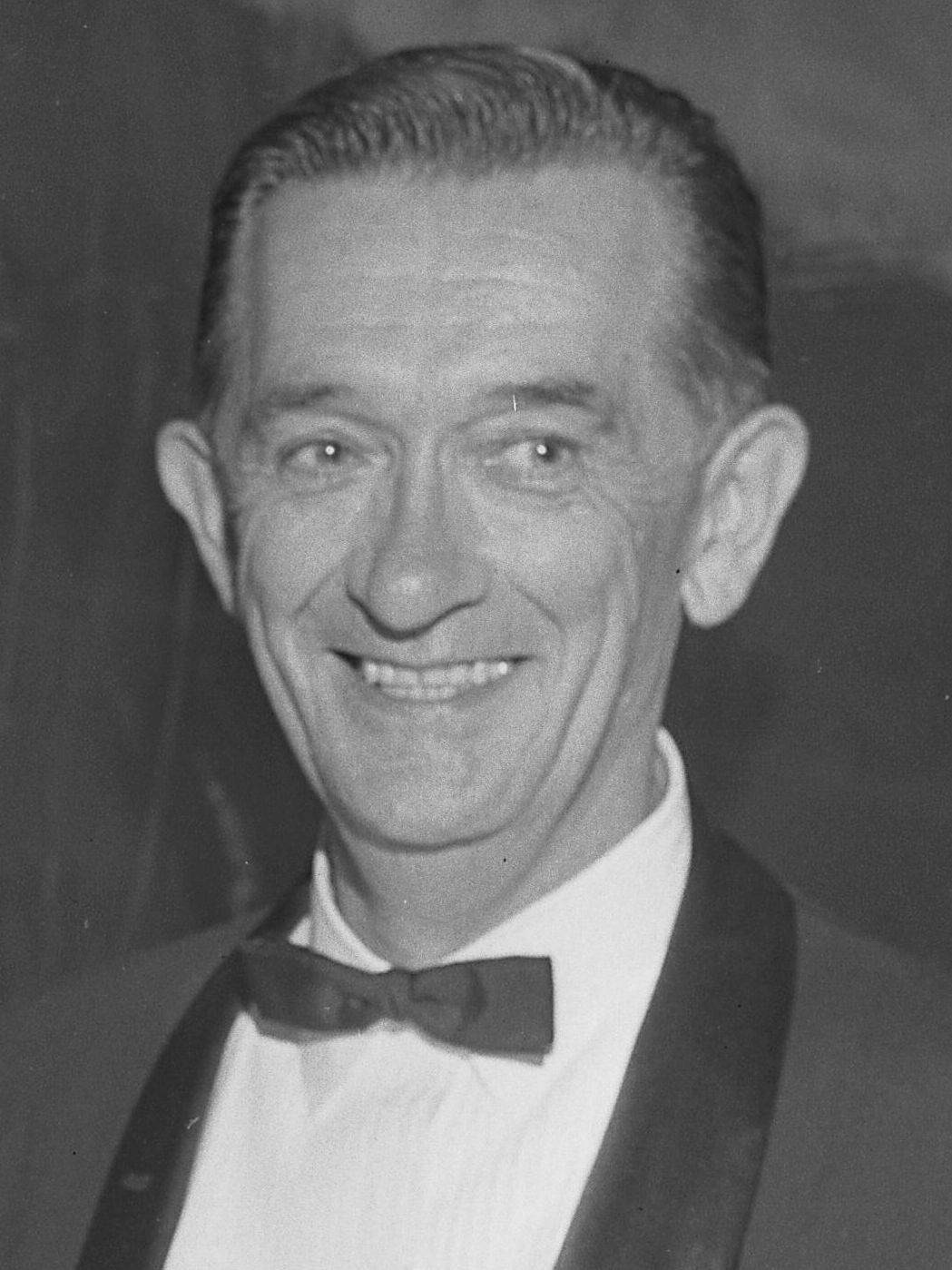

25th Attorney General of California
- In office August 31, 1964 – January 4, 1971
- Governor: Pat Brown; Ronald Reagan
- Preceded by: Stanley Mosk
- Succeeded by: Evelle J. Younger

District Attorney of San Francisco
- In office 1951–1964
- Preceded by: Pat Brown
- Succeeded by: John J. Ferdon

Personal details
- Born: May 20, 1904 San Francisco, California, U.S.
- Died: May 29, 1986 (aged 82) San Francisco, California, U.S.
- Party: Democratic

Thomas Conner Lynch (May 20, 1904 – May 29, 1986) was an American lawyer who served as District Attorney in San Francisco and as Attorney General of California from 1964 to 1971.

== Early life ==
Lynch was born in San Francisco in 1904 to Mary O'Conner and Patrick Lynch, an Irish immigrant from County Kerry. Lynch's mother died in 1906, and his father was killed in 1913 attempting to rescue a fellow worker while working on a sewer excavation. Subsequently raised by extended family members, Lynch attended Catholic grammar schools in San Francisco before attending Bellarmine College Preparatory and Santa Clara University. Lynch went on to attend law school at the University of San Francisco School of Law.

Following law school, Lynch was admitted to the bar in 1930 and worked as an insurance underwriter before being appointed an Assistant U.S. Attorney in 1933. Lynch later became chief deputy to Pat Brown following Brown's election as San Francisco District Attorney in 1943. Lifelong friends, Lynch and Brown had first met through mutual friends on trips to Yosemite.

Lynch was introduced to his future wife Virginia Summers Lynch by Pat Brown in 1928 at a dance at Camp Curry in the Yosemite Valley. The two later eloped to Lovelock, Nevada.

=== District Attorney of San Francisco ===
In 1951, Lynch was appointed District Attorney of San Francisco by Mayor Elmer Robinson following Brown's election as Attorney General.

== Attorney General of California ==
In 1964, Lynch was appointed Attorney General by Governor Pat Brown to succeed Stanley Mosk, who Brown had appointed to the Supreme Court of California. As Attorney General, Lynch helped draft legislation relating to law enforcement, including measures to control use of narcotics, to control promotion and sales of pornographic material and to control destructive devices and dangerous weapons. He also aided to improve the quality of law enforcement.

Running for a full term in 1966, Lynch was the only Democrat to retain statewide office amid Ronald Reagan's defeat of Pat Brown, defeating Spencer Mortimer Williams.

Notably, in 1968, Lynch released a report evaluating the actions of the city of Palm Springs in decimating the "Section 14" homes of approximating 200 families - almost entirely Black, Mexican-American and Native-American families leasing land from the Agua Caliente tribe, families including builders and support staff of wealthy white residents of the city – who had come home from work one day in 1965 to discover their homes bulldozed and burned down. Lynch's report noted that those families were living in Section 14 for two key reasons: "The average minority person could not afford to live in any other area of Palm Springs; and, de facto racial segregation was prevalent in Palm Springs as in other parts of California." Calling the city's action a "city-engineered holocaust", depriving Blacks and Latinos of generational wealth, the report concluded that, "The city of Palm Springs not only disregarded the residents of Section 14 as property owners, taxpayers and voters; Palm Springs ignored that the residents of Section 14 were human beings."

=== 1968 Democratic Party presidential primaries ===
Initially tapped to lead pro-Lyndon Johnson delegation prior to Johnson's decision not to seek reelection, Lynch ran as a favorite son candidate in the 1968 California Democratic presidential primary, placing third behind Robert F. Kennedy and Eugene McCarthy.

== Later life ==
Lynch died in San Francisco on May 29, 1986, following a six year battle with cancer. At the time of his death, Lynch was an attorney with the San Francisco law firm Gerald Marcus.

Legal offices
Preceded by Stanley Mosk	California Attorney General; 1964–1971	Succeeded by Evelle J. Younger
