= Evelle J. Younger =

American attorney and politician (1918–1989)

Evelle Younger
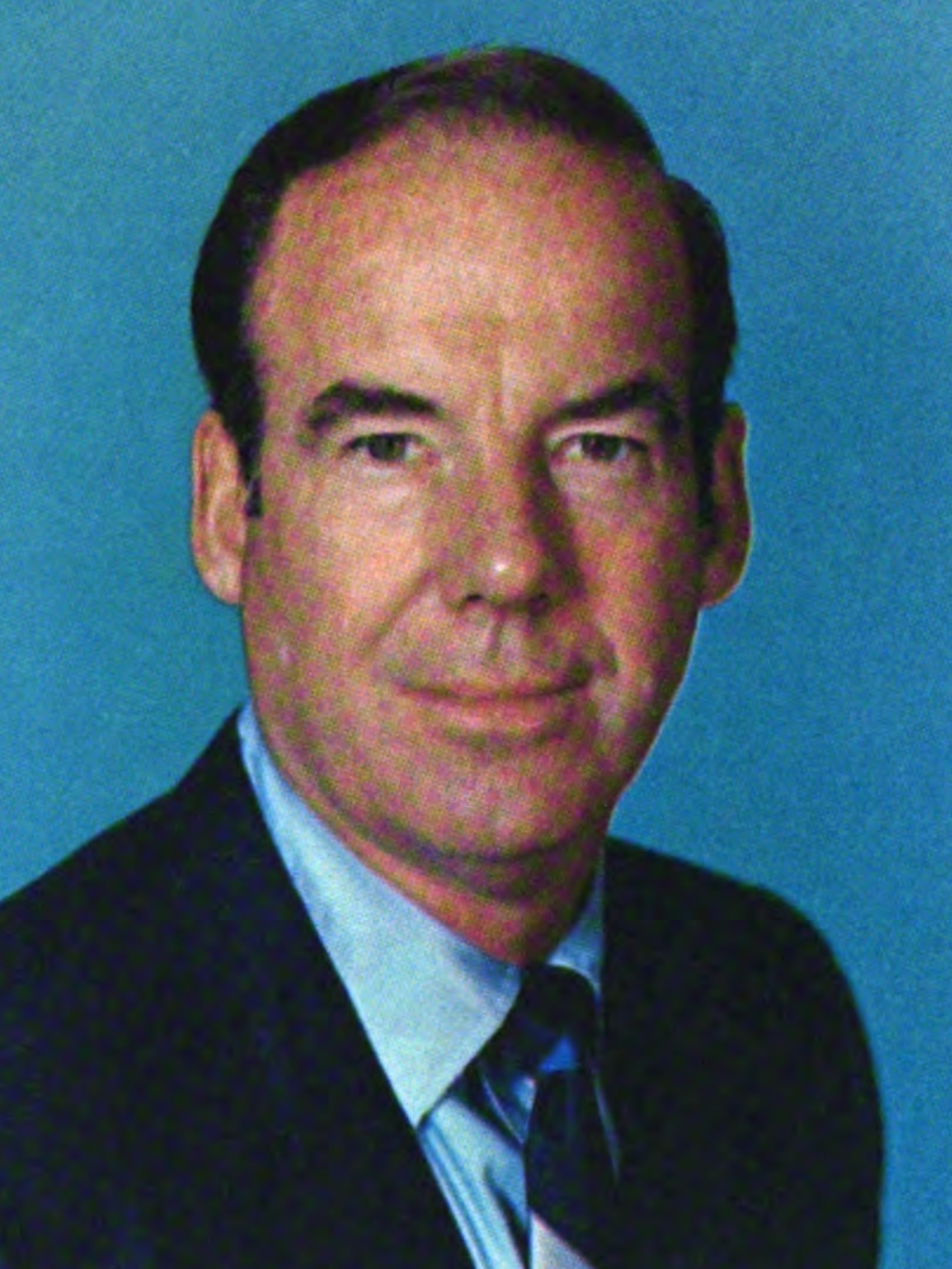
- Official portrait, 1971

26th Attorney General of California
- In office January 4, 1971 – January 8, 1979
- Governor: Ronald Reagan; Jerry Brown
- Preceded by: Thomas C. Lynch
- Succeeded by: George Deukmejian

35th Los Angeles County District Attorney
- In office 1964–1971
- Preceded by: William B. McKesson
- Succeeded by: Joseph P. Busch

Personal details
- Born: Evelle Jansen Younger; June 19, 1918 Stamford, Nebraska, U.S.
- Died: May 4, 1989 (aged 70) Los Angeles, California, U.S.
- Resting place: Los Angeles National Cemetery
- Party: Republican
- Spouse: Mildred Eberhard (m. 1942)
- Children: 1
- Education: University of Nebraska

Military service
- Allegiance: United States
- Branch/service: United States Army
- Battles/wars: World War II; Korean War

Evelle Jansen Younger (June 19, 1918 – May 4, 1989) was an American lawyer who served as the California Attorney General from 1971 to 1979. Prior to his career as Attorney General, he served as the district attorney in Los Angeles where he oversaw the prosecutions of both Charles Manson and Sirhan Sirhan. In 1978, he had an unsuccessful run as the Republican Party nominee for Governor of California and retired from politics a year later.

He joined the firm Buchalter, Nemer, Fields, & Younger as a senior partner in 1979 where he worked until his death a decade later.

== Early life and education ==
Younger was a second cousin twice removed of the Younger Brothers, a notable 19th-century gang of American outlaws that are often associated with the Jesse James gang. He was born in Stamford, Nebraska in 1918 and received his law degree from the University of Nebraska College of Law.

== Career ==
After graduating law school, at the age of 24, Younger became an FBI Special Agent. As an agent he was one of J. Edgar Hoover's top agents. In the early 1940s, it was later revealed that Younger, as an FBI agent, was one of several agents tasked by Hoover with spying on International Longshore and Warehouse Union President, Harry Bridges, while he was staying at The Edison Hotel in New York City. Bridges discovered his phone and rooms were tapped after he became suspicious when hotel staff insisted on him using a room different from his usual accommodations and following a trail of wires from his phone to an adjoining room. Bridges secretly left the room, unbeknownst to the FBI agents keeping tabs on him, went to the roof of an adjoining hotel, and spied on agents listening to the taps believing Bridges was still in the room. After a few days watching the agents with colleagues, reporters, and a photographer, Bridges called the police, leading to the agent on duty jumping out the window and down the fire escape, leaving behind abandoned wires and a carbon paper with the name "Evelle J. Younger, Special Agent" on the desk with his equipment. The incident led to national ridicule towards the Bureau. U.S. Attorney General Francis Biddle insisted Hoover inform President Franklin Roosevelt about the incident personally, and accompanied him to the White House. After hearing the story, Roosevelt smiled and slapped Hoover on the back, remarking, "By God, Edgar, that's the first time you've been caught with your pants down." Younger later became a member of CIA forerunner the Office of Strategic Services, serving in the Burma-China-India theater during World War II.

Younger served in the United States Army during World War II as well as Korea. He was a municipal judge in California from 1953 to 1958 and a superior court judge in California from 1958 to 1964, when he became district attorney of Los Angeles County. He also rose to the rank of Major General in the US Air Force Reserve, and was the first to be promoted to the rank of Brigadier General (Reserve) as a Special Agent in the AF Office of Special Investigations.

Early in his career as a judge, Younger hosted KTLA's weekly crime drama Armchair Detective, and was later a consultant and presiding judge on the reality show Traffic Court on KABC-TV. He also authored the book Judge and Prosecutor in Traffic Court.

During his time as the Los Angeles district attorney, he oversaw criminal cases which included the prosecutions of Charles Manson and Sirhan Sirhan. He is the first prosecutor in the United States to prosecute mass felony charges against college campus demonstrators in the 1960s. Younger was elected as the 26th Attorney General of California, the first Republican in a generation to do so.

As the Attorney General, Younger helped develop the California Environmental Quality Act. He also advocated for a broad interpretation of its applicability, filing a brief in the landmark case Friends of Mammoth v. Board of Supervisors in 1972. The ruling in the case was considered one of the most important for environmental rulings, requiring an evaluation of environmental impact prior to any public agency sanction of new construction. In the 1978 Republican primary, Younger defeated Edward M. Davis, Kenneth L. Maddy, and Pete Wilson (who would win both the Republican primary and the office twelve years later) to win the Republican gubernatorial nomination. He lost the general election to incumbent Jerry Brown by a landslide.

Younger retired from public service in 1979 and joined the firm Buchalter, Nemer, Fields, & Younger as a senior partner (named Buchalter, Nemer, Fields, Chrystie and Younger at the time).

== Personal life ==
Younger married Mildred Eberhard on July 3, 1942. Their son, Eric, who became a Los Angeles County Superior Court judge, was born in San Francisco in 1943. Younger died from heart disease at his home in the Hollywood Hills on May 4, 1989, at the age of 70. He is interred in the Los Angeles National Cemetery alongside his wife, Mildred Eberhard Younger, who died in 2006.

Legal offices
Preceded by William B. McKesson	Los Angeles County District Attorney; 1964–1971	Succeeded by Joseph P. Busch
Preceded by Thomas C. Lynch	California Attorney General; 1971–1979	Succeeded by George Deukmejian
Party political offices
Preceded by Houston I. Flournoy	Republican Party nominee for Governor of California; 1978	Succeeded by George Deukmejian
