= Schedule of the 1956 Democratic National Convention =

Each day from August 13 to August 17, 1956, general sessions of the 1956 Democratic National Convention were held at the Chicago International Amphitheatre in Chicago.

The convention's introductory speeches were delivered on the afternoon of August 13, including a welcoming speech by Richard J. Daley (mayor of Chicago). On the evening of August 13, the keynote speech was delivered by Frank G. Clement (governor of Tennessee) that evening, with an introductory film narrated by John F. Kennedy (senator from Massachusetts) shown before it. Also speaking that evening was Eleanor Roosevelt (former first lady). On the afternoon of August 14, the schedule of speakers primarily featured leading women of the Democratic Party, including several female members of the House of Representatives. On the convention of August 14, the convention formally appointed Sam Rayburn (House speaker) as its permanent chairman, and Rayburn addressed the convention as its chairman. On the evening of August 15, John W. McCormick (House majority leader) presented the proposed party platform to the convention, which voted to adopt it. The convention nominated Adlai Stevenson II for president on August 16, and Estes Kefauver for vice president on the afternoon of August 17. On the evening of August 17, speeches were delivered by both nominees, as well as former president Harry S. Truman. Frank Sinatra, Howard Keel, and Vaughn Monroe were among those who performed renditions of the Star Spangled Banner during the convention.

== Logistics ==
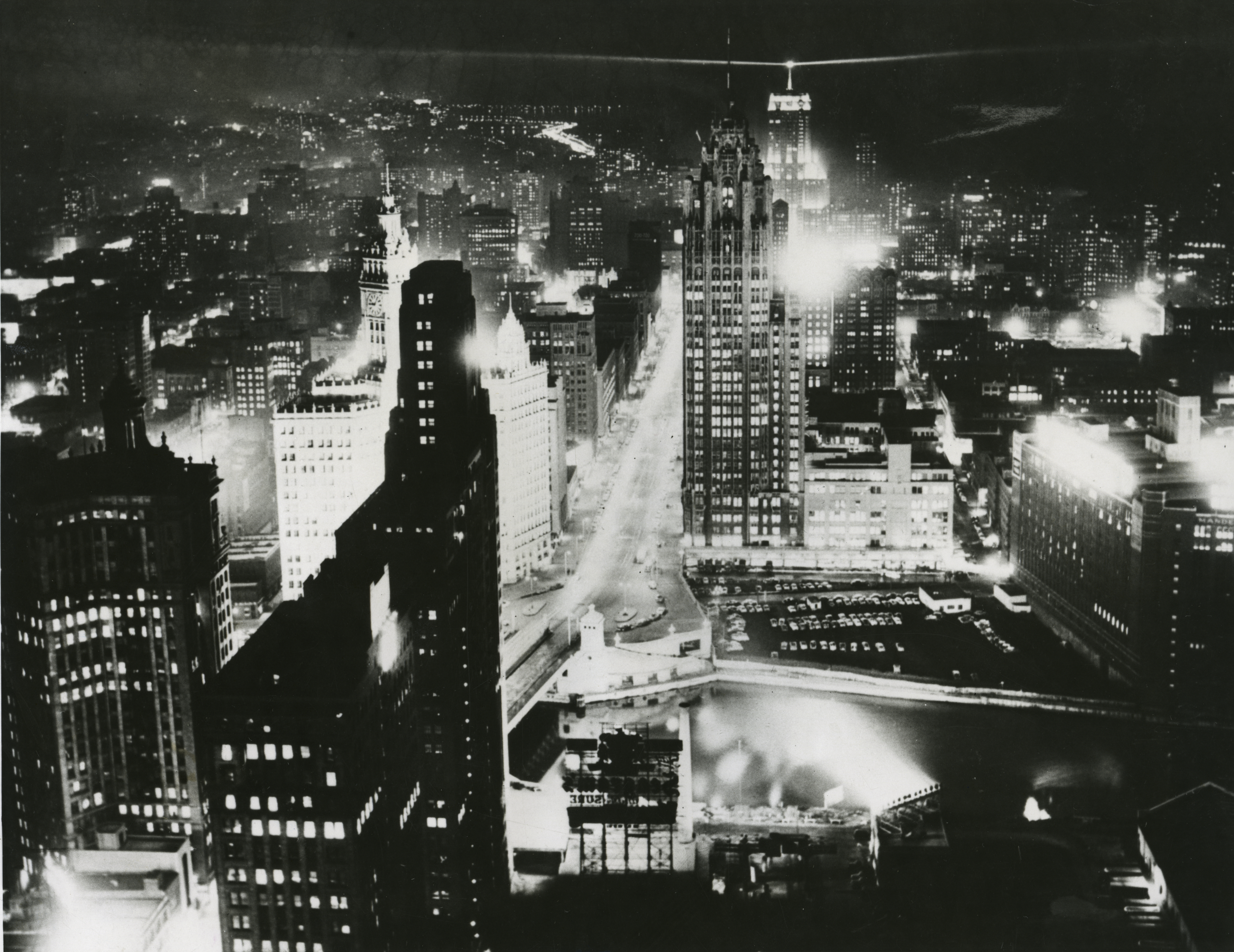
Downtown Chicago two nights before the convention. Structures prominent in the photograph include London Guarantee Building, 333 North Michigan, Michigan Avenue Bridge (over the Chicago River), Wrigley Building, Tribune Tower, and Palmolive Building

Prior to 1956, it had been typical that Democrats would hold their convention after the Republicans held their's. From 1864 through 1952, the Democratic Party had held its convention at an later date than the Republicans in every election except 1888. Republicans had previously attempted in 1952 to usurp this norm by scheduling their convention much a later date than normal in hopes that it would force Democrats to choose an earlier week for their convention, but Democrats still opted to hold their convention in an even later week. Contrary to historic practice, in 1956 the Democrats held their convention at a later date than the Republican convention. From 1956 onwards, it has become an informal tradition that the party with White House incumbency hosts their convention at a later date than the other major party.

Afternoon sessions were scheduled for a start time at 12:00pm local time, while evening sessions were schedule for a start time at 8:00pm local time.

Some consideration was given by party leaders that, in the instance that the party selected its nominee quickly, they might encourage the nominee to deliver an acceptance speech on the same evening they won the nomination (instead of delivering their acceptance speech on the closing evening of the convention). This was because it was anticipated that a near-prime time speech by the nominee on the night of the nomination balloting might provide higher viewership of the nominee's remarks. Stevenson did end up winning the nomination quickly, and delivered remarks on the same evening he was nominated. However, instead of an acceptance speech, his remarks that evening were an announcement that he would not be indicating a preferred running-mate and would instead leave vice presidential nominee selection wholly leave it up to the convention delegates' discretion.

== August 13 afternoon session: opening session ==
Entrance ticket for first session

- invocation
- performance of The Star Spangled Banner
- Speaking program:

Speakers and performers for 1st afternoon (Monday, August 13) of 1956 convention
Speaker	Position/notability	Notes	Cite
Paul Butler	chairman of the Democratic National Committee	opening remarks	
Dorothy Vredenburgh	secretary of the Democratic National Committee	call for convention	
Marvin Griffin	governor of Georgia	presentation of gavel	
Richard J. Daley	mayor of Chicago and chairman of the Cook County Democratic Party	welcoming address	
Jacob M. Arvey	member of the Democratic National Committee from Illinois		
Dorothy Vredenburgh	secretary of the Democratic National Committee	report on temporary convention officers	
George Smathers	senator from Florida and chairman of the Democratic Senatorial Campaign Committee		
Michael J. Kirwan	congressman from Ohio and chairman of the Democratic Congressional Campaign Committee		

== August 13 evening session ==
Eleanor Roosevelt (left), seated in the convention hall crowd on August 13

- invocation
- performance of The Star Spangled Banner by Frank Sinatra
- speaking program:

Speakers for 1st evening (Monday, August 13) of 1956 convention
Speaker	Position/notability	Notes	Cite
Paul Butler	chairman of the Democratic National Committee	report as chairman of the Democratic National Committee	
John F. Kennedy	senator from Massachusetts	narration of keynote film	
Frank G. Clement	governor of Tennessee	keynote address	
Eleanor Roosevelt	former first lady of the United States		

== August 14 afternoon session ==
Entrance ticket for third session

- invocation
- performance of The Star Spangled Banner
- speaking program:

Speakers for 2nd afternoon (Tuesday, August 14) of 1956 convention
Speaker	Position/notability	Notes	Cite
David A. Bunn	president of Young Democratic Clubs of America		
Katie Louchheim	director of women’s activities for the Democratic National Committee		
Edna F. Kelly	congresswoman from New York		
Leonor Sullivan	congresswoman from Missouri		
Gracie Pfost	congresswoman from Idaho		
Edith Green	congresswoman from Idaho		
Martha Griffiths	congresswoman from Michigan		
Coya Knutson	congresswoman from Minnesota		
Iris Faircloth Blitch	congresswoman from Georgia		
Thaddeus M. Machrowicz	congressman from Michigan		

== August 14 evening session ==
- invocation
- performance of The Star Spangled Banner by Howard Keel
- speaking program:

Speakers for 2nd evening (Tuesday, August 14) of 1956 convention
Speaker	Position/notability	Notes	Cite
LeRoy Collins	governor of Florida and chair of the convention's Committee on Permanent Organization	report of the Committee on Permanent Organization (Note: was immediately followed by a vote on the appointment of the committee to escort the permanent chairman and the introduction of the permanent chairman)	
Sam Rayburn	speaker of the United States House of Representatives and permanent chairman of the convention	address by newly-appointed permanent chairman of the convention	
Richard B. Richards	member of the California State Senate and nominee for U.S. Senate		
Harold Russell	former national commander of American Veterans of World War II and Korea		
Wayne Morse	senator from Oregon		

== August 15 evening session ==
- Invocation
- Performance of The Star Spangled Banner by Vaughn Monroe
- speaking program:

Speakers for 3rd evening (Wednesday, August 15) of 1956 convention
Speaker	Position/notability	Notes	Cite
John W. McCormack	House majority leader	Report of Committee on Resolutions and Platform (Note: followed by vote to adopt platform)	
Robert S. Kerr	senator from Oklahoma		
William L. Dawson	congressman from Illinois and vice chair of the Democratic National Committee		

== August 16 afternoon session: roll call of states (presidential nominating speeches) ==
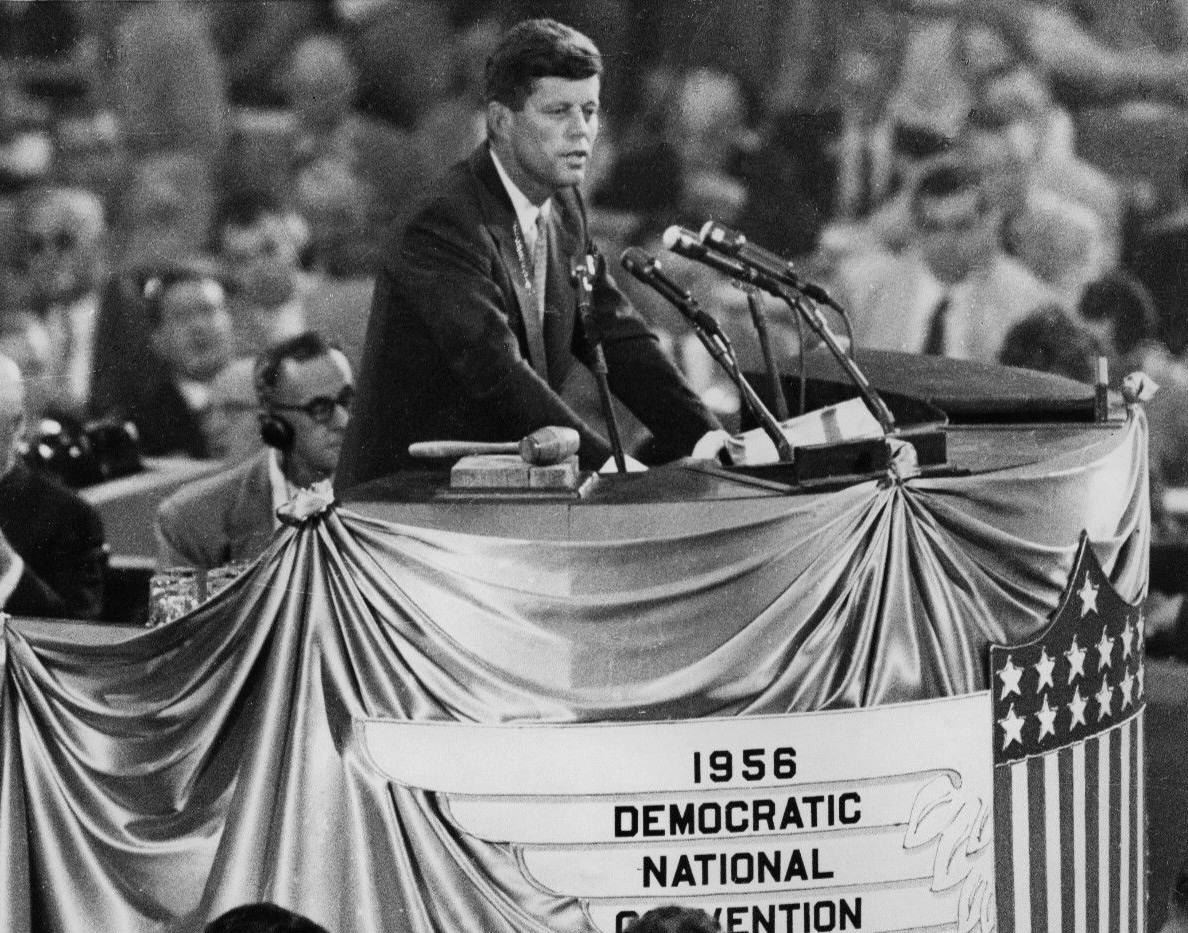
U.S. Senator John F. Kennedy nominating Stevenson on August 16

- Invocation by C. Luther Cunningham (reverend, St. Paul's Baptist Church of Philadelphia)
- Performance of The Star Spangled Banner
- Roll call of states ahead of presidential balloting:

Nominating, seconding, and withdrawal speeches delivered during roll call
Speaker	Position/notability	Notes	Cite
Henry M. Jackson	senator from Washington	nominating speech for Warren Magnuson	
Warren Magnuson	senator from Washington	speech withdrawing own name from consideration	
John F. Kennedy	U.S. Senator from Massachusetts	nominating speech for Adlai Stevenson II	
Edith Green	congresswoman from Idaho	seconding speeches for Adlai Stevenson II	
Herbert Lehman	senator from New York	seconding speeches for Adlai Stevenson II	
Luther Hodges	governor of North Carolina	seconding speeches for Adlai Stevenson II	
George Leader	governor of Pennsylvania	seconding speeches for Adlai Stevenson II	
William A. Dawson	congressman from Illinois and vice chair of the Democratic National Committee	seconding speeches for Adlai Stevenson II	
Raymond D. Gary	governor of Oklahoma	nominating speech for Averell Harriman	
Harry S. Truman	former president	seconding speeches for Averrell Harriman	
Thomas C. Hennings Jr.	senator from Missouri	nominating speech for Stuart Symington	
Joseph J. Leary	advisor to Alabama Gov. Chandler	nominating speech for Happy Chandler	
Pitt Tyson Maner	convention floor manager of Chandler campaign	seconding speeches for Happy Chandler	
Alex Campbell	convention delegate from Indiana	seconding speeches for Happy Chandler	

== August 16 evening session: presidential nomination balloting ==
- Invocation
- Performance of The Star Spangled Banner
- Presidential balloting
- Remarks by Adlai Stevenson II (as presidential nominee) announcing that he would not be selecting a preferred running-mate

== August 17 afternoon session: vice presidential nominating ==
- Invocation
- Performance of The Star Spangled Banner
- Vice presidential balloting

== August 17 evening session: closing session ==
- Invocation
- Performance of The Star Spangled Banner
- Speaking program:

Speakers for 5th evening (Friday, August 17) of 1956 convention
Speaker	Position/notability	Notes	Cite
Harry S. Truman	former president		
Estes Kefauver	senator from Tennessee	acceptance speech of vice presidential nominee	
Adlai Stevenson II	former governor of Illinois	acceptance speech of presidential nominee	

- Benediction
- Final adjournment
