= Roger Murdock =

Roger Murdock may refer to:

- Roger E. Murdock (1909–1995), police chief
- Roger Murdock, drummer for the band King Missile
- Roger Murdock, a character in the film Airplane!, played by Kareem Abdul-Jabbar
