= Thad Brown =

Thad Brown or Thaddeus Brown could refer to:

- Thad F. Brown (1902–1970), former chief of the Los Angeles Police Department
- Thad H. Brown (1887–1941), American politician from Ohio
- Thaddeus Brown, a fictional character from the DC Comics universe
- Thad Brown (broadcaster), sports reporter for WROC-TV and the Buffalo Bills
