= Jet Lady =

1982 album by Tangela Tricoli

Studio album by Tangela Tricoli
- Released: 1982
- Genre: Folk-pop, lo-fi
- Length: 35:25
- Label: Arf! Arf! Records (2004 reissue)

Jet Lady is a 1982 album by Angela Masson, released under the name Tangela Tricoli. Masson is an accomplished pilot who flew with American Airlines, set several speed records, and was the first woman cleared to fly Boeing 747s. The album included songs that originated on her 1980s public access talk show Tangela Tonight. Only 1,000 copies of the album were pressed, and it loitered in obscurity until its inclusion in the 2002 outsider music compilation Songs in the Key of Z. Masson's singing on the album has been described as off-key and "deranged". The song "Stinky Poodle" from the album has been noted for its resemblance to "Smelly Cat", sung by Lisa Kudrow on the sitcom Friends. Jet Lady was reissued with bonus tracks in 2004 by Arf! Arf! Records.

== Background ==
Angela Masson (Tangela Tricoli) is a pioneering aviator who captained flights with American Airlines for 20 years. She was the first woman to be authorized to fly the Boeing 747 and set several world speed records with the Boeing 777. She earned her PhD from the University of Southern California in aerospace safety, teaches aeronautics, and patented the first true electronic flight bag.

In the early 1980s, Masson had a public access talk-variety show in Los Angeles called Tangela Tonight. Some of the songs that Masson recorded for Jet Lady originated on the show. The song "Stinky Poodle" was a theme song for the show and honored the poodles that appeared in each episode.

== Music and recording ==
"Jet Lady"
A 28-second audio sample of the song "Jet Lady"

Masson composed, arranged and sang all of the songs on Jet Lady. She provided her own accompaniment on acoustic guitar, tablas, piano, and synthesizer. On some of the songs, including "Stinky Poodle", she doubles her vocal track and uses reverb and echo. Masson addresses various topics in her songs, such as love, flying jets, looking for cheese at the supermarket, space women, and the life of a housewife. Masson said that she created the 11-track album "just for fun" as a way for her to be creative.

Jet Lady was Masson's sole album and only 1,000 copies were pressed. According to Masson, at one point she put the remaining 200 copies of the album in a Texas storage facility where they disappeared. They were distributed through Tower Records. The cover of the album depicts Masson wearing her officer insignia and pilot's cap.

The title track from the album, "Jet Lady", was included in the second volume of the outsider music compilation Songs in the Key of Z in 2002. An expanded edition of Jet Lady was released by Arf! Arf! Records in 2004. It included six bonus tracks and several multimedia files with video footage of Tricoli in the early 1980s. For the reissue, Masson re-recorded a version of "Stinky Poodle" in 2003 along with her nieces and her daughter. Also included were two duets she made with Ed Howes, one a cover of "You Don't Have to Say You Love Me". The album includes a 40-page booklet with photographs, an interview of Masson by Erik Lindgren, and a foreword by Irwin Chusid. Included among the multimedia files are four 30-second television commercials from when Masson was a candidate in the 1981 Los Angeles mayoral election.

== Critical reception and legacy ==
Professional ratings
Review scores
Source	Rating
AllMusic	3.5/5 stars

Richie Unterberger of AllMusic described Jet Lady as benignly "deranged" and likely to be considered bad by most listeners' standards, while noting that enthusiasts of outsider music would probably enjoy it. Darryl W. Bullock of World's Worst Records called the album wonderful, having "a unique, ethereal sound unlike anything else". The book Songs in the Key of Z describes Jet Lady as a "musical flight without a crew" and Masson as a "Lynchian", "acoustic Patti Smith with anti-gravity shoes" who "plays guitar as if her hand were webbed".

Most reviews of the album note that Masson's singing is not always on-key. A review in CMJ New Music Monthly found that Masson "proves her concept of melody is somewhere in the clouds". Unterberger wrote that Masson has "a wavering voice that drifts between keys just as often as her lyrics drift woozily between topics". A review of the album in the 1993 book Incredibly Strange Music found that "her singing is spectacularly off—as if Wanda Jackson had turned into Mrs. Miller." Bullock characterizes her voice as "a cross between Frances Baskerville the Singing Psychic and Lucia Pamela". Masson said in a 2010 interview that "I sing about everything I do. I can't sing on-key, but that doesn't stop me."

The strong resemblance of Masson's "Stinky Poodle" to the song "Smelly Cat" performed by the character Phoebe Buffay (Lisa Kudrow) on the television sitcom Friends led to speculation that the song served as inspiration.

== Track listing ==
Original 1982 release
No.	Title	Length
1.	"Supermarket Blues"	3:45
2.	"Time Is On Our Side"	3:35
3.	"Jet Lady"	3:52
4.	"Space Woman"	2:39
5.	"Glorious Morning"	4:30
6.	"Love Has A Fire"	2:32
7.	"Rocky's Garden"	2:39
8.	"Stinky Poodle"	3:58
9.	"Hey Mio Amore"	1:36
10.	"Life Of A Housewife"	2:30
11.	"City Of Angels"	3:49

Additional tracks from the 2004 reissue
No.	Title	Length
12.	"Time Is on Our Side" (bonus track)	2:51
13.	"Jet Lady" (bonus track)	4:05
14.	"City of Angels" (bonus track)	1:33
15.	"Almost Persuaded" (bonus track)	5:23
16.	"You Don't Have to Say You Love Me" (bonus track)	2:32
17.	"Stinky Poodle 2003" (bonus track)	4:57
18.	"Best of Tangela Tonight" (multimedia track)	30:53
19.	"Jet Lady Unplugged" (multimedia track)	23:20
20.	"Tangela for Mayor of Los Angeles" (multimedia track)	2:07
21.	"Tangela and Ed Howes Rehearsal" (multimedia track)	3:42
