= Thomas Reddin =

American law enforcement officer and commentator

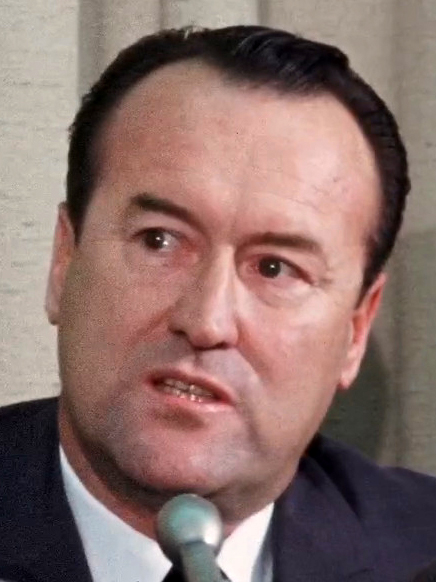
- Reddin in 1967

Chief of the Los Angeles Police Department
- In office 1967–1969

Personal details
- Born: June 25, 1916 New York City, New York, U.S.
- Died: December 4, 2004 (aged 88) Los Angeles, California, U.S.
- Party: Republican
- Other political affiliations: Independent (1973)

Thomas Reddin (June 25, 1916 – December 4, 2004) was a Los Angeles Police Department chief from 1967 to 1969. He left May 6, 1969, to become a news commentator. He also owned a Los Angeles–based private security company, which was named for him.

== Biography ==
Reddin was born in New York City in 1916. His father was a millionaire who became rich building amusement parks but later lost the fortune in oil speculation in Oklahoma. Reddin would live in Oklahoma and Denver, Colorado, for his childhood, attending the University of Colorado Denver before dropping out from lack of funds, and serving in the US Navy for 4 years during the Depression. After moving to Los Angeles, he became manager of a service station. Noted for his large frame, several police officers who stopped at the station suggested Reddin become an officer. He joined the LAPD in 1941 after begin impressed with how the force caught a robber who had held him up and robbed the station, while learning the salary offered was higher. Reddin was promoted to sergeant in 1945, lieutenant in 1949, captain in 1953, inspector in 1955, and deputy chief in 1960 under William Parker, being chief of detectives when Parker died.

Reddin was named LAPD chief in February 1967. At the moment, Time magazine lauded him as an "optimist" and "genial giant", while contemporary reports noted how the department had been shaken by its inadequacies made bare in Watts, with police commanders unable to communicate with patrol cars due to using different frequencies, a lack of planning and training in urban unrest, and Parker's lack of refusal to talk with community leaders. Reddin in 1968 told Time that, regarding his approach to police reform, that a contemporary officer should not only be well-tained as a soldier but also "“streetcorner sociologist", while stating that 1968 would be "the year when the public will suddenly realize that the policeman has more to do with the state of our nation than any other man on the streets today." He helped modernize the department and introduced the community policing concept, which "perceives the community as an agent and partner in promoting security rather than as a passive audience." During his tenure, he allowed his department to give technical advice for the first three seasons of the revived version of the Jack Webb-created detective drama Dragnet. (He even made an appearance at the end of the Season Two finale, "The Big Problem", in a plea for improved community relations between the department and the city) and during the first season (1968–1969) of the police drama Adam-12. Reddin's community and public relations image would help define a large part of his tenure; one journalist in 1968 would describe him as a "top-notch salesman" and "an undeniably talented publicist" who "sometimes slips unconsciously into the huckster’s rhetoric."

One factor altered in Reddin's tenure was the police's response to riots and unrest. Reddin would later claim to Time, regarding the Watts riots that “[w]e were so anxious not to cause a riot that we backed off at first and let a riot develop,” and adjusted police response to be faster and with laid-out force to suppress unrest. This also continued to his creation of the S.W.A.T. unit. Early in his tenure, Reddin oversaw the LAPD response to the 1967 anti-Vietnam War march in Century City. Acting on information from undercover operatives, Reddin], on the pretext of believing that an assault on the hotel was imminent, ordered the crowd dispersed. After several dispersal orders were issued, police began moving in with nightsticks and attacking protesters, many of whom were not resisting or fighting back. At least one eyewitness later described seeing injured protesters fleeing, making their way down to Olympic on a steep embankment, which was one of the few ways to escape as the nightstick-wielding police waded in. Reddin would quietly order officers not to raise their nightsticks above their shoulders after this; decades later, Reddin would acknowledge that women had been beaten by police during the demonstration, but denied "probable brutality." Later in 1968, Reddin would lead the LAPD investigation into the assassination of Robert Kennedy, working 42 hours including a news conference with then-mayor Sam Yorty announcing that Sirhan Sirhan had been identified by his brother. By 1969, some contemporary observers felt that progress had been made, but noted that the community outreach programs were often viewed with suspicion by young men in "ghetto" neighborhoods, and patrol officers were resentful of the concessions which came out of community councils as well as Reddin's negotiations with Black militants; at the same time, Reddin was then adamant about not allowing more civilian participation over discipline.

Reddin would leave the department in 1969 to become a newscaster for local TV station KTLA for 3 years. He would run for mayor in 1973 but come in fourth, winning 13 percent of the vote in the race, but ultimately losing to Tom Bradley. After this, Reddin would form his own private security business and ran it for over 20 years. Reddin died in 2004 at the age of 88 from Parkinson's disease.

Police appointments
Preceded by Thad F. Brown	Chief of LAPD; 1967–1969	Succeeded by Roger E. Murdock
