= 1962 United States Senate election in California =

- November 6, 1962
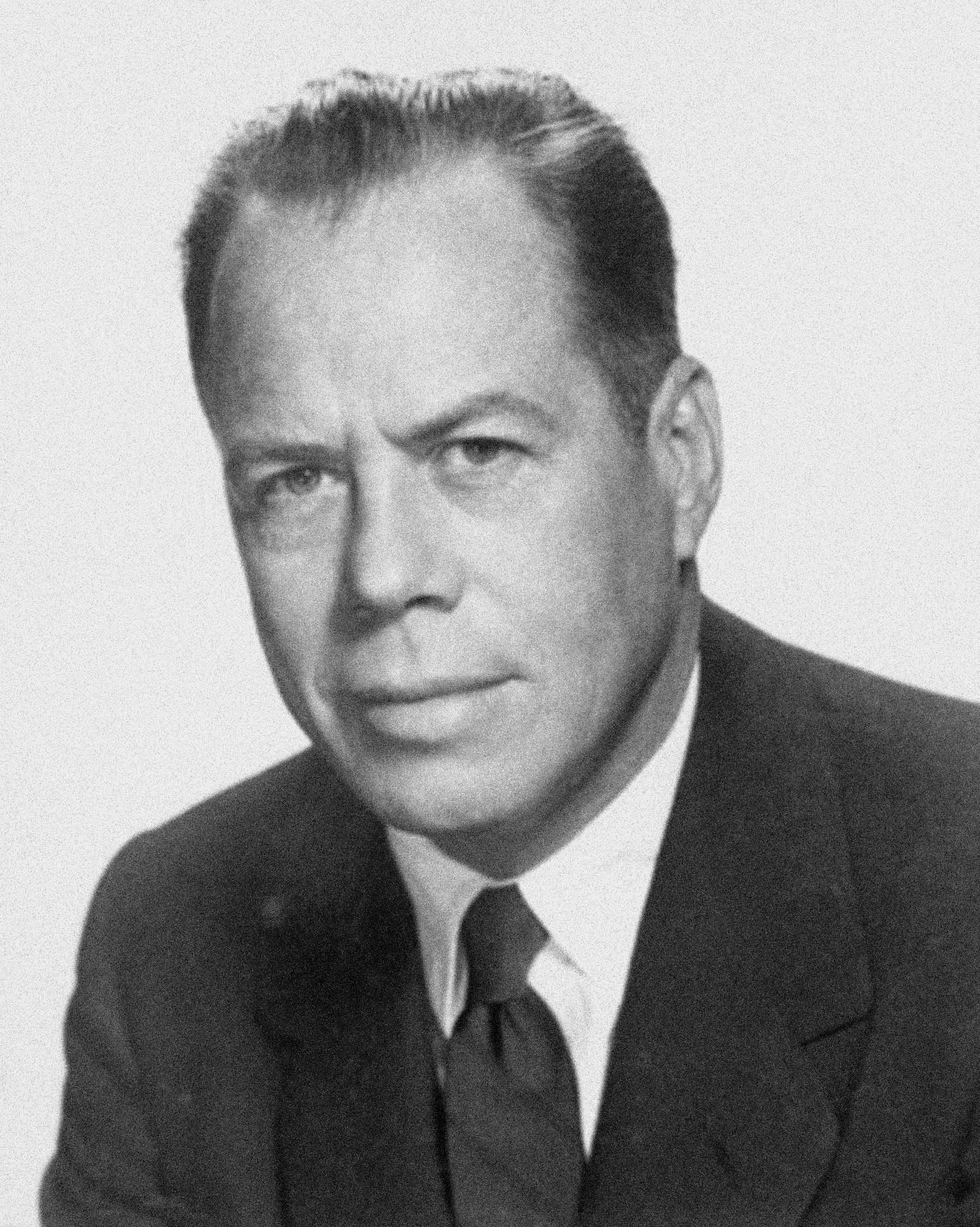

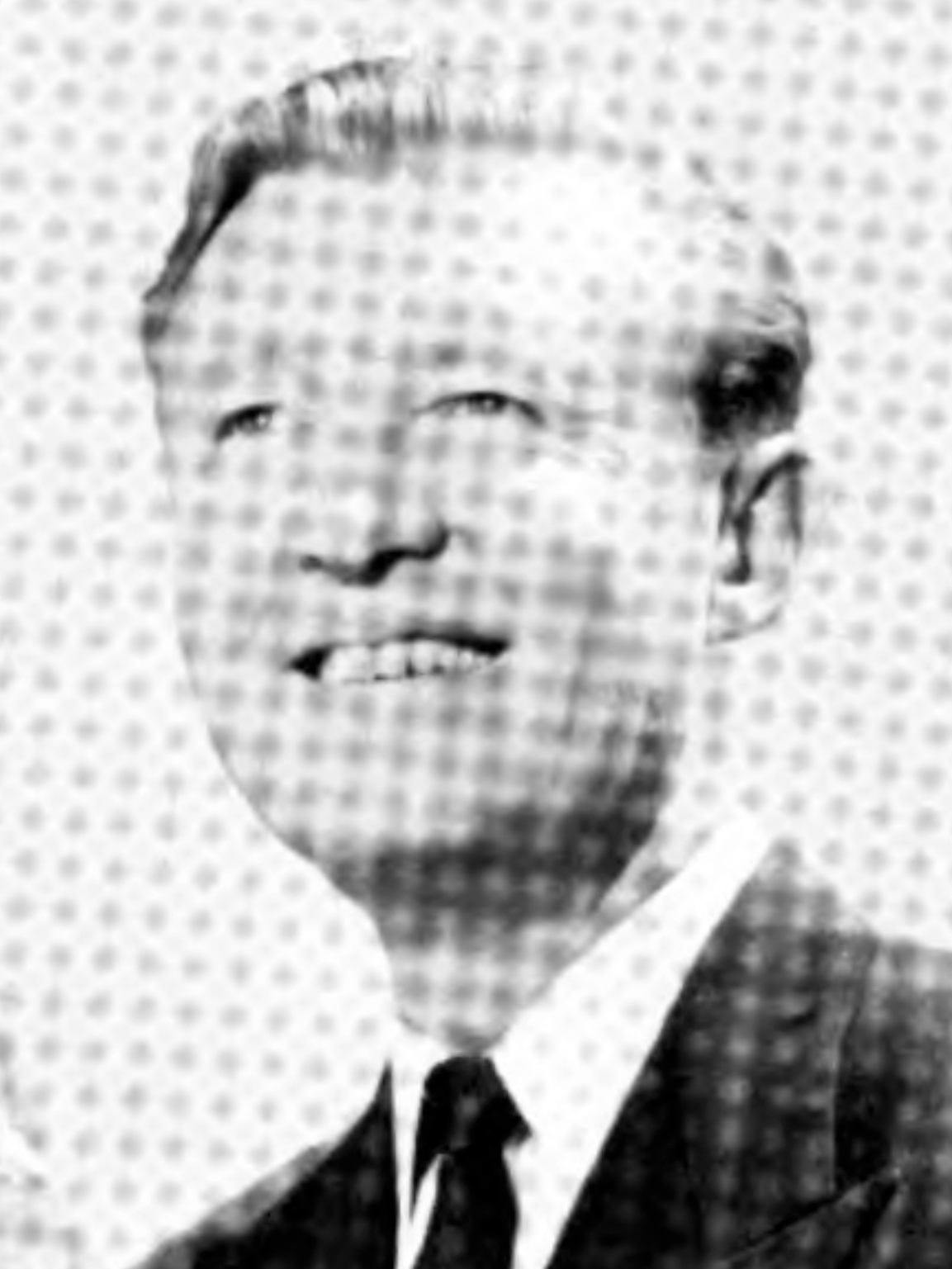
Nominee	Thomas Kuchel	Richard B. Richards
Party	Republican	Democratic
Popular vote	3,180,483	2,452,839
Percentage	56.31%	43.43%
- County results Kuchel: 50–60% 60–70% 70–80%
U.S. senator before election
Thomas Kuchel
Republican
Elected U.S. Senator
Thomas Kuchel
Republican

The 1962 United States Senate election in California was held on November 6, 1962. Republican incumbent Thomas Kuchel was elected to a third term in office over Democratic state senator Richard B. Richards. Kuchel carried every county in California and remains the most recent candidate for Senate to do so as of 2026. (Note: Democrat Alan Cranston came very close in 1974, losing Inyo County by only 55 votes.) As of 2026, this is the last time a Republican was elected to the Class 3 Senate seat from California.

== Republican primary ==
=== Candidates ===
- Thomas Kuchel, incumbent U.S. senator since 1953
- Howard Jarvis, Los Angeles industrialist and anti-tax activist
- William H. Reinholz
- Loyd Wright, former president of the American Bar Association

=== Results ===
1962 Republican U.S. Senate primary results
Party	Candidate	Votes	%
Republican	Thomas Kuchel (incumbent)	1,357,975	75.02%
Republican	Loyd Wright	247,300	13.66%
Republican	Howard Jarvis	180,768	9.99%
Republican	William H. Reinholz	24,100	1.33%
Total votes		1,810,143	100.00

== Democratic primary ==
=== Candidates ===
- J. F. Coleman
- Gabriel Green, photographer and UFO conspiracy theorist
- Richard B. Richards, state senator from San Gabriel and nominee for this seat in 1956

=== Results ===
1962 Democratic U.S. Senate primary
Party	Candidate	Votes	%
Democratic	Richard B. Richards	1,674,563	82.58%
Democratic	Gabriel Green	171,379	8.45%
Democratic	J.F. Coleman	170,926	8.43%
Republican	Thomas Kuchel (incumbent) (write-in)	10,927	0.54%
Total votes		2,027,795	100.00%

== General election ==
=== Candidates ===
- Thomas Kuchel, incumbent U.S. senator since 1953 (Republican)
- Richard B. Richards, state senator from San Gabriel and nominee for this seat in 1956 (Democratic)

=== Campaign ===
Write-in campaigns were launched for anti-tax activist Howard Jarvis, 1962 Nobel Peace Prize recipient and proponent of nuclear disarmament Linus Pauling, and Edward Brothers, but none made a significant impact on the race.

=== Results ===
1962 United States Senate election in California
Party	Candidate	Votes	%	±%
Republican	Thomas Kuchel (incumbent)	3,180,483	56.31%	▲2.35
Democratic	Richard B. Richards	2,452,839	43.43%	▼9.47
Independent	Howard Jarvis (write-in)	9,963	0.18%	N/A
Independent	Linus Pauling (write-in)	2,694	0.04%	N/A
Independent	Edward Brothers (write-in)	284	0.00%	N/A
Write-in	All others	1,689	0.02%	N/A
Total votes		5,647,952	100.00%	
Republican hold		Swing		
