= Marguerite P. Justice =

Marguerite P. Justice (July 1921 – 17 September 2009) was the second woman, and the first black woman, to serve as a police commissioner in the United States.

== Early life ==
Marguerite P. Justice was born Marguerite P. Lecesne in New Orleans in July 1921. She was the youngest of the three children of her parents, Albert and Louise Lecesne. She moved to Los Angeles in 1945 and found work as a seamstress. In the early 1950s she became the private secretary to Linda Darnell, an actress. In 1954 Lecesne was to marry Pittsburgh Courier columnist Don Brown, but instead left her job with Linda Darnell to marry William H. Justice, whom she had met at church that year.

== Police Commissioner ==
In 1971, Justice was appointed to a two-year term on the 5-seat Los Angeles Police Commission by Mayor Sam Yorty, becoming the second woman, and the first black woman, to be named to the Los Angeles Police Commission. She was affectionately known by the LAPD as "Mama J". In 1972, her experience was loosely adapted in a two-part episode of the TV series Adam-12, "Clear with a Civilian", the fourteenth and fifteenth installments of the fifth season. The credits at the end express gratitude to Justice, "the first and only woman police commissioner in the United States".

== Community service and other activity ==
Justice became a popular community activist in Los Angeles. In 1971, the Los Angeles Times quoted her as saying "I'm fortunate to be married to a fine man who has provided me with leisure time for community work".

In 1969, she formed a service group, the Southwest Sweethearts, supporting the Southwest Division of the LAPD. The group was used during the 1984 Los Angeles Olympics to set up a round-the-clock hospitality house, providing meals and showers for police officers. Justice was given the Police Historical Society's Jack Webb Award for "her sustained commitment to law enforcement". She helped the society with its remodeling of its historic exhibit of LAPD uniforms, which was named the Marguerite Justice Gallery upon completion.

She was appointed in 1984 by Governor George Deukmejian to the Bicentennial Commission for the U.S. Constitution.

Throughout her life, Justice worked with various youth groups in the Los Angeles area, such as the youth fellowship program at St. Mark United Methodist Church.

She died at Los Angeles Cedars-Sinai Medical Center.
