= Howard Jarvis =

American businessman and activist (1903–1986)

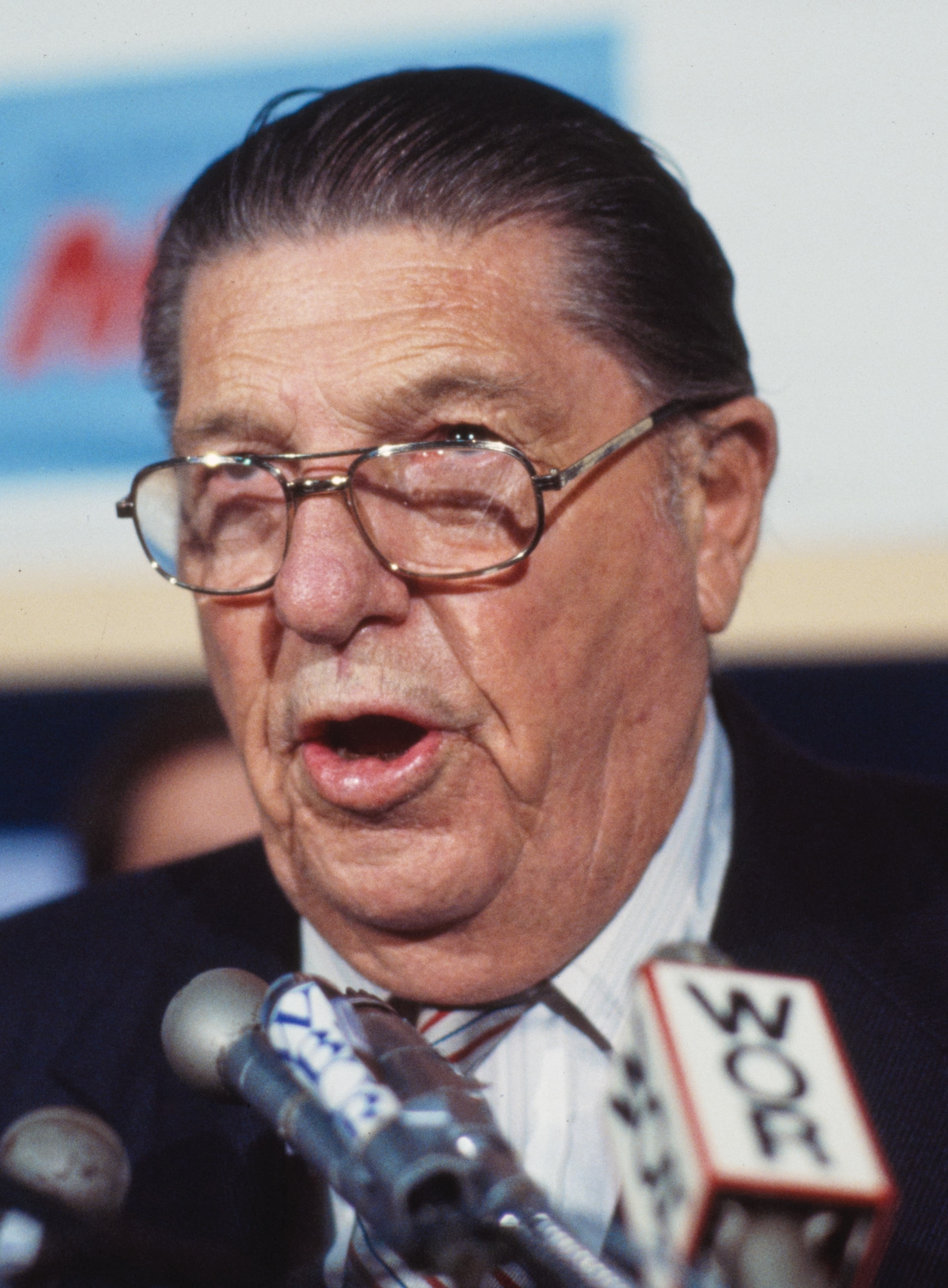
- Jarvis in 1978
- Born: September 22, 1903; Magna, Utah, U.S.
- Died: August 12, 1986 (aged 82); Los Angeles, California, U.S.
- Resting place: Forest Lawn - Hollywood Hills
- Education: Utah State University
- Occupations: Businessman, lobbyist, politician
- Employer: Los Angeles Apartment Owners Association
- Organization: Howard Jarvis Taxpayers Association
- Known for: Proposition 13
- Political party: Republican
- Spouse(s): Myrtle Corrine Fickes (1924–); Carrie Louise Martin; Estelle Garcia (c. 1965)
- Website: www.hjta.org

Howard Arnold Jarvis (September 22, 1903 – August 12, 1986) was an American businessman, lobbyist, and politician. He was a tax policy activist responsible for passage of California's Proposition 13 in 1978.

== Early life and education ==
Jarvis was born in Magna, Utah. Although he was raised as a Mormon, he smoked cigars and drank vodka as an adult.

He graduated from Utah State University. In Utah, he had some political involvement working with his father's campaigns and his own. His father was a state Supreme Court judge and, unlike Jarvis, a member of the Democratic Party. Howard Jarvis was active in the Republican Party and also ran small town newspapers. He served as a press officer for Herbert Hoover's 1932 presidential campaign and supported Barry Goldwater in 1964.

He moved to California in the 1930s due to a suggestion by Earl Warren. Jarvis bought his home at 515 North Crescent Heights Boulevard in Los Angeles for $8,000 in 1941. By 1976, it was assessed at $80,000. He married his third wife, Estelle Garcia, around 1965.

== Political career ==
Jarvis was a Republican primary candidate for the U.S. Senate in California in 1962, but the nomination and the election went to the moderate Republican incumbent Thomas Kuchel. Subsequently, Jarvis ran several times for Mayor of Los Angeles on an anti-tax platform and gained a reputation as a harsh critic of government.

He founded the California Tax Reduction Movement after the June 1978 passage of California Proposition 13. The proposition adjusted the property tax rate, pegging it at 1% of the purchase price of the property. This proposal was popular, largely due to the high inflation and associated rises in property taxes through the 1970s. Jarvis and his wife collected tens of thousands of signatures to enable Prop. 13 to appear on a statewide ballot, for which he garnered national attention. The ballot measure passed with nearly two-thirds of the vote. Two years later, voters in Massachusetts enacted a similar measure.

The goals of this organization were to protect Proposition 13 and further the "taxpayer revolt."[6] Upon Jarvis's death in 1986, his former personal assistant, Joel Fox, took over as the organization's head, formally incorporating and changing its name to Howard Jarvis Taxpayers Association.

In the campaign, Jarvis argued that lowering property tax rates would cause landlords to pass savings on to renters, who were upset at their rapidly rising rents driven by the high inflation of the 1970s. Most landlords did not do this, which became a motivating factor for rent control.

== Awards ==
In 1979, Jarvis received the S. Roger Horchow Award for Greatest Public Service by a Private Citizen, an award given out annually by Jefferson Awards.

== Controversies ==
=== DUI arrest ===
Jarvis was arrested for DUI on March 15, 1978. Jarvis was pulled over in Ventura County by officer Michael Kipp for driving at a high rate of speed and swerving across lanes. Kipp testified that Jarvis failed three sobriety tests and was unable to recite the alphabet. Kipper further stated that during their interaction Jarvis denied driving the car and remarked "That's right, I'm Howard Jarvis and you realize what you've done to yourself". During the trial Jarvis argued that his erratic driving was the result of threats against his life which triggered fear and anxiety.

=== Racial slurs ===
Jarvis was heard referring to one of his Jewish opponents as a "lying kike lawyer from Brooklyn". The incident was reported during the failed Proposition 9 campaign of 1980. Proposition 9 was an effort championed by Jarvis designed to limit income taxes in California. Following a debate with attorney and former assemblyman William T. Bagley on San Francisco television station KPIX Jarvis reportedly commended Bagley for his debate performance and, as Bagley recalls it, stated "You're not like Reiner. He is a goddamned lying lawyer kike son of a bitch from Brooklyn." Jarvis was referring to Los Angeles city controller Ira Reiner, who is Jewish, and was a strong opponent of Proposition 9. San Francisco Examiner reporter Jim Wood recalled hearing Jarvis only say "lying kike lawyer from Brooklyn" in reference to Reiner.

Jarvis was criticized by Asian-American groups for using the slur "Japs" after the defeat of Proposition 9. "The public employees have won the first battle like the Japs won the first battle at Pearl Harbor, but the United States won the war," remarked Jarvis following the election. The slur also appears in print in Jarvis' 1979 book "I'm Mad as Hell: The Exclusive Story of the Tax Revolt and Its Leader".

== Film appearance ==
In 1980, he had a cameo appearance in the film Airplane!, playing an incredibly patient taxicab passenger. His character apparently spends the entire movie sitting in an empty cab waiting for the driver (played by Robert Hays) to return, with the meter running all the while. Jarvis has the final line in the movie, which he says after the end credits; he looks at his watch and says "Well, I'll give him another twenty minutes, but that's it!" The inside joke was that Jarvis would never have paid for such a charge in real life.

== Death ==
Jarvis died in 1986 in Los Angeles at the age of 82, of complications of a blood disease.

== Bibliography ==
- Jarvis, Howard; Robert Pack (1979). I'm mad as hell : the exclusive story of the tax revolt and its leader. New York: Times Books. pp. 310 pp. ISBN 0-8129-0858-9. OCLC 5170210.

== Additional sources ==
- Smith, David A. (Summer 1999). "Howard Jarvis, Populist Entrepreneur: Reevaluating the Causes of Proposition 13". Social Science History. 23 (2). Duke University Press: 173–210. doi:10.1017/S0145553200018058. JSTOR 1171520. S2CID 148178213.
