= 1981 Los Angeles mayoral election =

- April 7, 1981
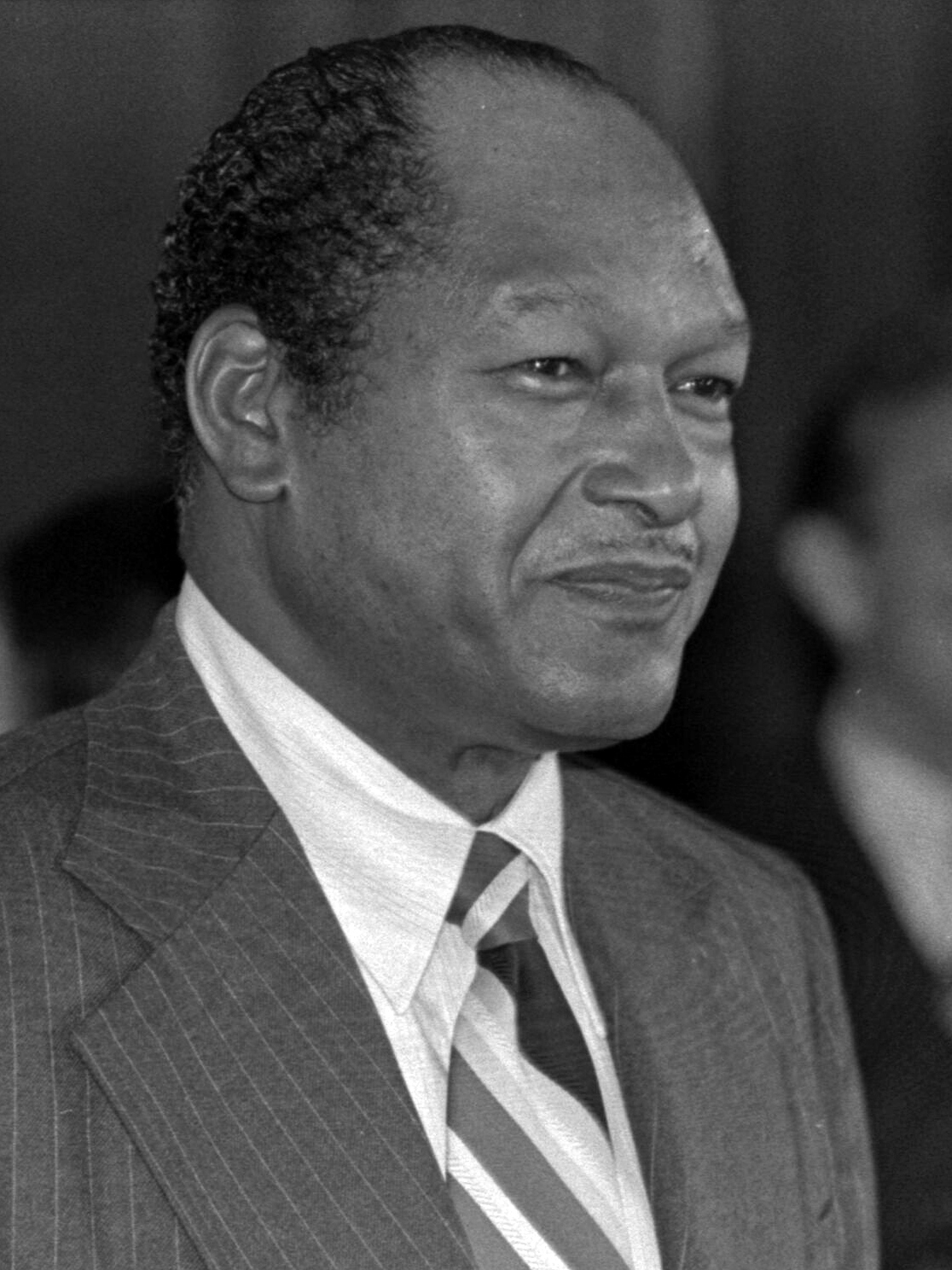

Candidate	Tom Bradley	Sam Yorty
Popular vote	293,501	148,193
Percentage	63.84%	32.23%
Mayor before election
Tom Bradley
Elected Mayor
Tom Bradley

The 1981 Los Angeles mayoral election took place on April 7, 1981. Incumbent Tom Bradley was re-elected over former Mayor Sam Yorty. The election was a third rematch between Bradley and Yorty, the other two being in 1969 and 1973. It would be the last time a Mayor would be elected to a third term, as voters amended the city charter in 1993 to implement a two-term limit for the office of Mayor.

Municipal elections in California, including Mayor of Los Angeles, are officially nonpartisan; candidates' party affiliations do not appear on the ballot.

== Candidates ==
- Sally Acosta
- Mort Allen
- Eileen Anderson
- Tom Bradley, incumbent mayor since 1973
- Douglas Carlton
- Robert Deutsch
- Robert S. Fischer Jr.
- Daniel Webster Henderson Jr.
- Michael A. Hirt
- Arnold B. Luster
- Max Odrezin
- Zack Richardson
- Henry V. Seyfried
- Earl Smith
- Tangela Masson Tricoli, pilot and public-access television host
- James A. Ware
- Sam Yorty, former mayor of Los Angeles
- John Anthony Zrynyi

=== Declined ===
- Daryl Gates, chief of the Los Angeles Police Department

== Election ==
Yorty had been a last-minute challenger, saying that he had been urged to run after LAPD Chief Daryl Gates announced that he would not challenge Bradley. Yorty said that he "sees the crime issue as the key to the contest" and was seen as injecting racism into the race by saying to a group of businessmen that "black people are really racist. They vote for black people because they're black." Bradley defeated Yorty and the other candidates in a landslide, with some calling the election a "lackluster affair."

== Results ==
Los Angeles mayoral general election, April 7, 1981
Candidate	Votes	%
Tom Bradley (incumbent)	293,501	63.84
Sam Yorty	148,193	32.23
Robert S. Fischer Jr.	2,464	0.54
John Anthony Zrynyi	2,055	0.45
Zack Richardson	1,835	0.40
Eileen Anderson	1,822	0.40
Sally Acosta	1,464	0.32
Jim Little	1,056	0.23
James A. Ware	1,050	0.23
Max Odrezin	969	0.21
Arnold B. Luster	966	0.21
Robert Deutsch	738	0.16
Tangela Masson Tricoli	704	0.15
Mort Allen	667	0.15
Earl Smith	625	0.14
Henry V. Seyfried	457	0.10
Michael A. Hirt	455	0.10
Daniel Webster Henderson Jr.	392	0.09
Douglas Carlton	368	0.08
Total votes	459,781	100.00
