= 1956 United States Senate election in California =

- November 6, 1956
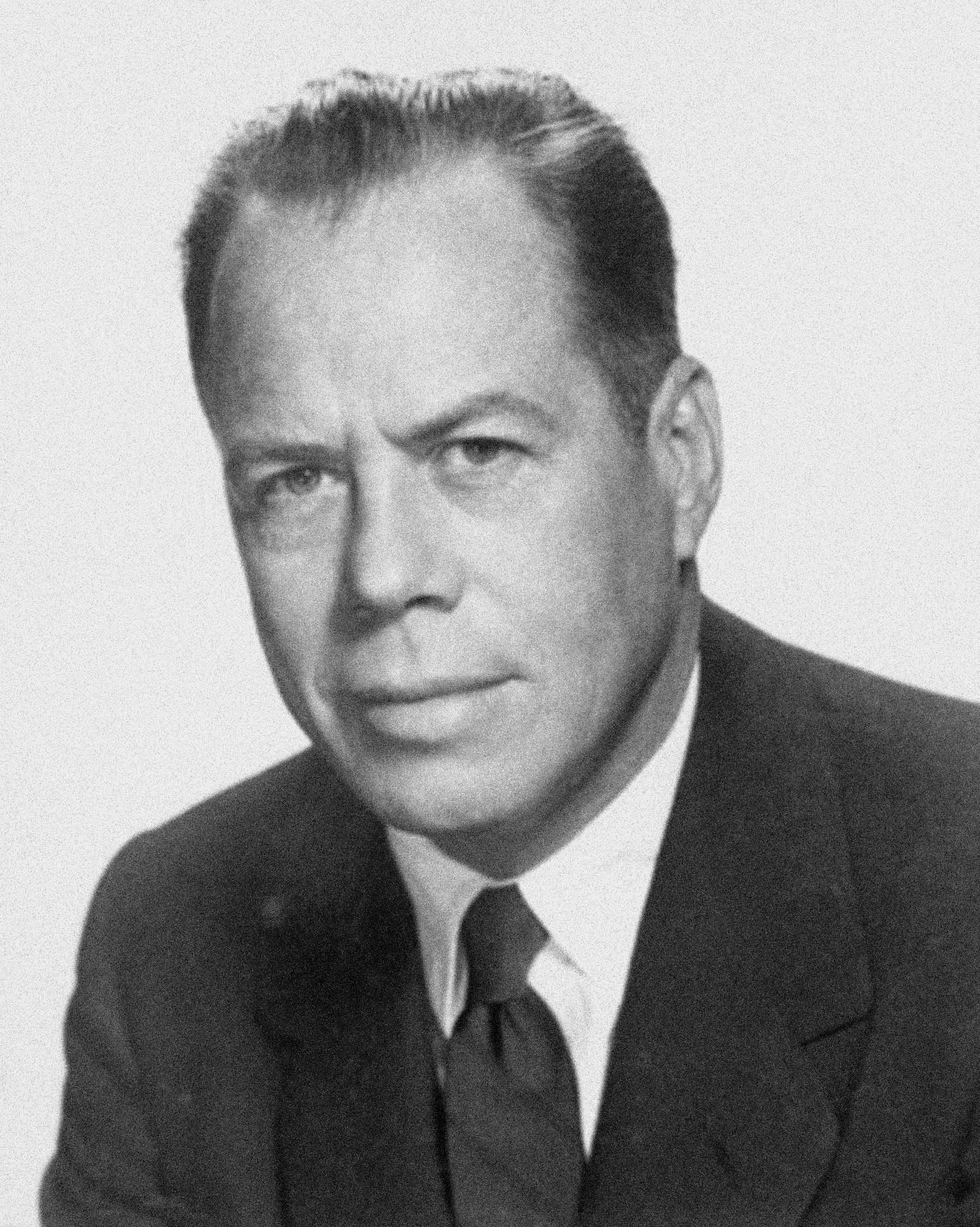

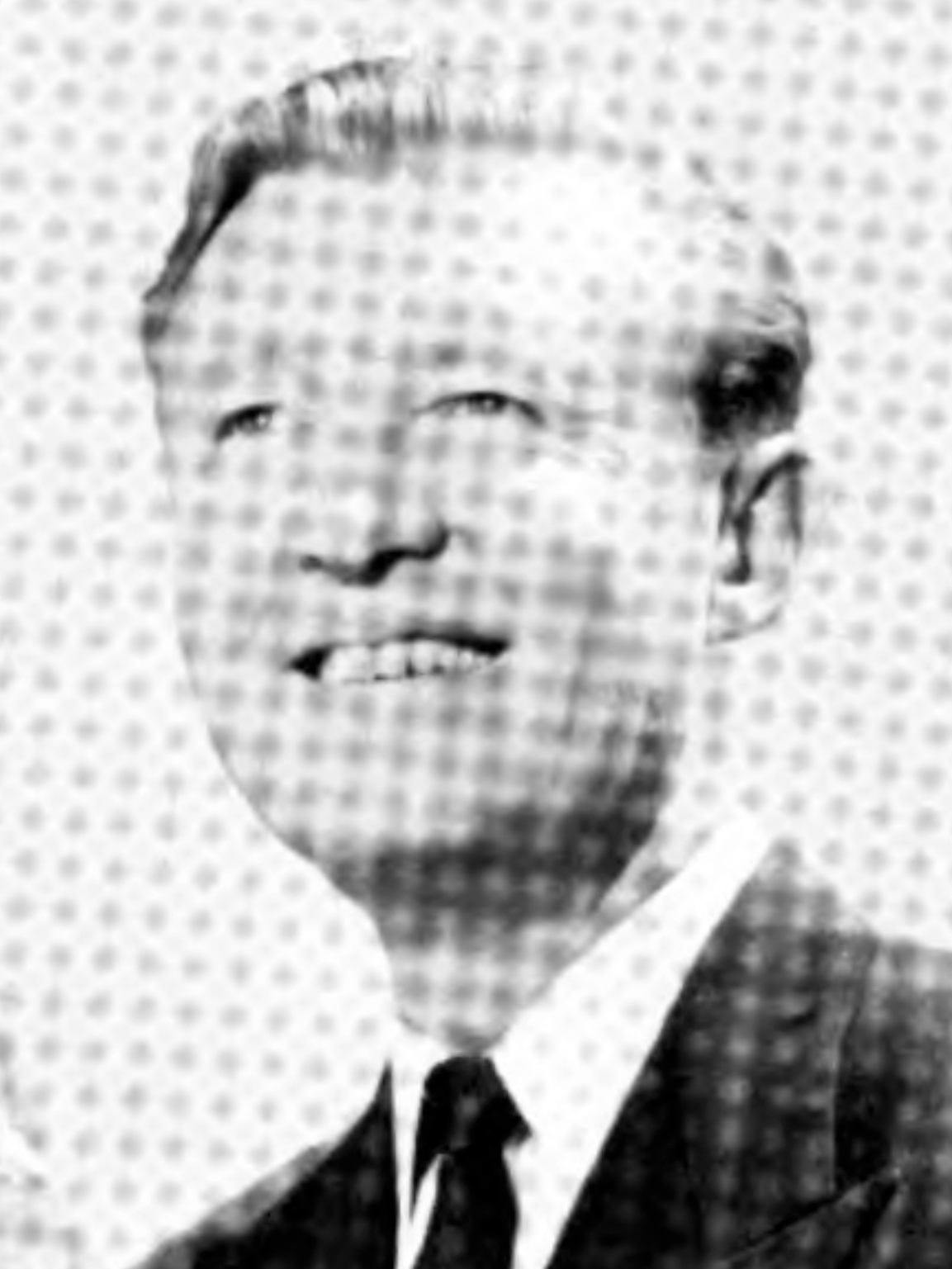
Nominee	Thomas Kuchel	Richard B. Richards
Party	Republican	Democratic
Popular vote	2,892,918	2,445,816
Percentage	53.96%	45.62%
- County results Kuchel: 40–50% 50–60% 60–70% 70–80% 80–90% Richards: 40–50% 50–60%
U.S. senator before election
Thomas Kuchel
Republican
Elected U.S. Senator
Thomas Kuchel
Republican

The 1956 United States Senate election in California was held on November 6, 1956. Republican incumbent Thomas Kuchel was elected to a second term (and first full term) in office over Democratic state senator Richard B. Richards.

== Republican primary ==
=== Candidates ===
- Tilden W. Johnson
- Thomas Kuchel, incumbent U.S. senator since 1953
- Raymond R. Pritchard
- Sam Yorty, former U.S. representative from Los Angeles and Democratic nominee for this seat in 1954 (cross-filing)

=== Results ===
1956 Republican U.S. Senate primary results
Party	Candidate	Votes	%
Republican	Thomas Kuchel (incumbent)	1,332,074	80.45%
Democratic	Sam Yorty (cross-filing)	247,300	13.66%
Republican	Raymond R. Pritchard	47,515	3.23%
Republican	Tilden W. Johnson	30,243	2.05%
Total votes		1,472,745	100.00%

== Democratic primary ==
=== Candidates ===
- Thomas Kuchel, incumbent U.S. senator since 1953 (cross-filing)
- Richard B. Richards, state senator from San Gabriel
- Sam Yorty, former U.S. representative from Los Angeles and nominee for this seat in 1954

=== Results ===
1956 Democratic U.S. Senate primary
Party	Candidate	Votes	%
Democratic	Richard B. Richards	1,004,336	53.36%
Republican	Thomas Kuchel (inc.) (cross-filing)	494,066	26.25%
Democratic	Sam Yorty	383,813	20.39%
Total votes		1,882,215	100.00%

== General election ==
=== Candidates ===
- Ray Gourley (Prohibition)
- Thomas Kuchel, incumbent U.S. senator since 1953 (Republican)
- Richard B. Richards, state senator from San Gabriel (Democratic)

=== Results ===
1956 United States Senate election in California
Party	Candidate	Votes	%	±%
Republican	Thomas Kuchel (incumbent)	2,892,918	53.96%	▲0.75
Democratic	Richard B. Richards	2,445,816	45.62%	▲0.11
Prohibition	Ray Gourley	22,410	0.42%	N/A
Total votes		5,361,144	100.00%	
Republican hold		Swing		
