= 1954 United States Senate special election in California =

- November 2, 1954
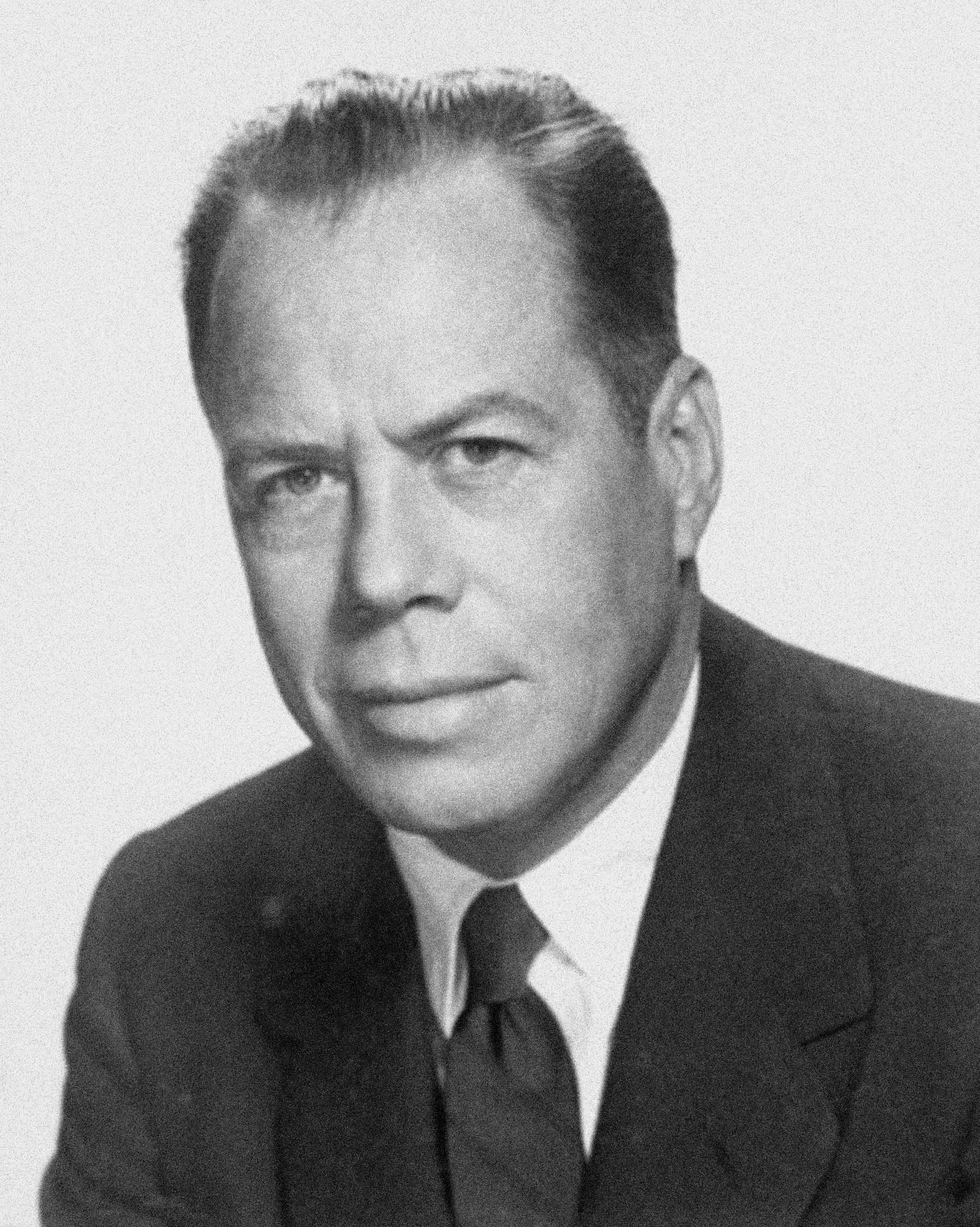

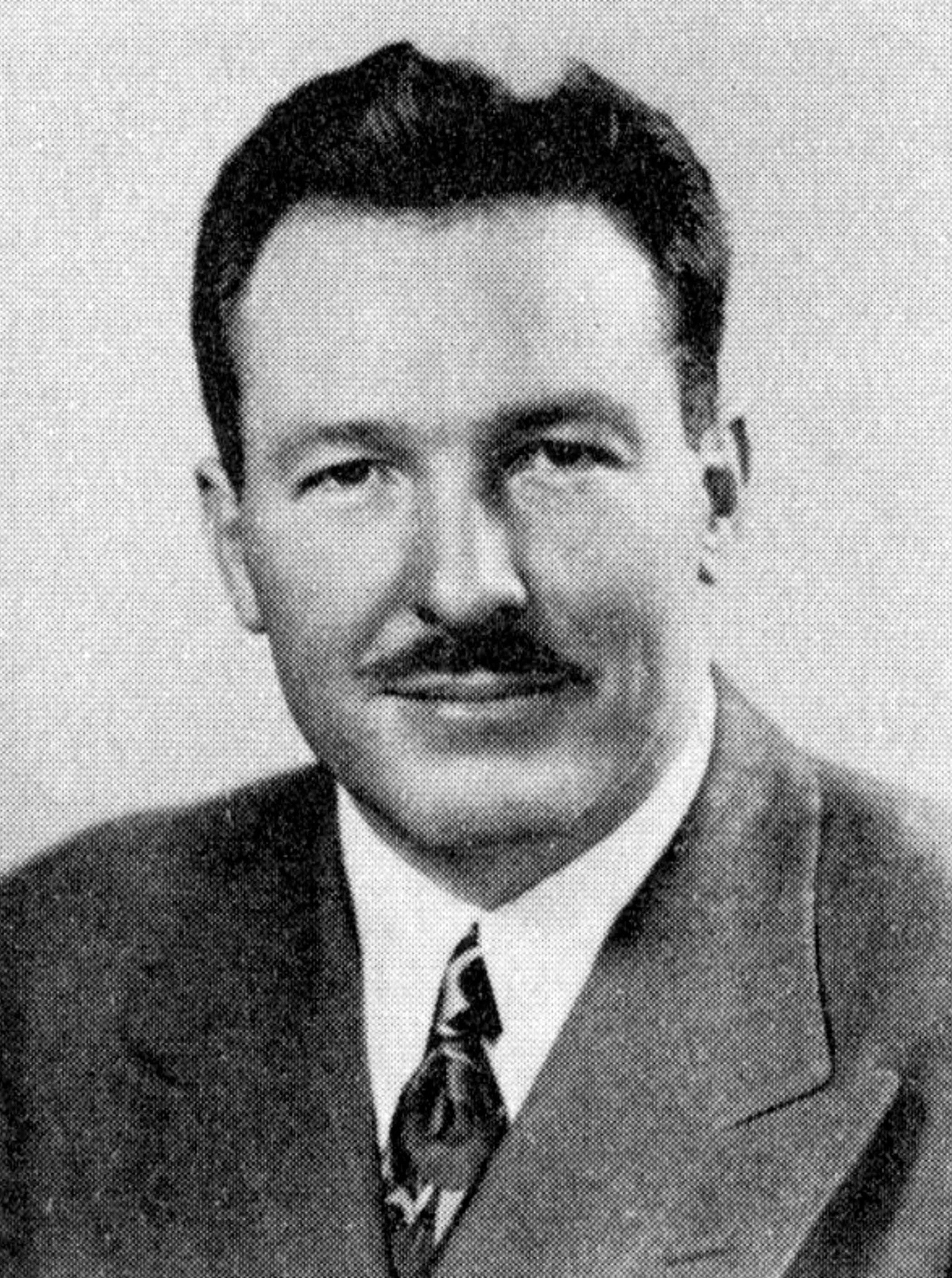
Nominee	Thomas Kuchel	Sam Yorty
Party	Republican	Democratic
Popular vote	2,090,836	1,788,071
Percentage	53.21%	45.50%
- County results Kuchel: 40–50% 50–60% 60–70% 70–80% Yorty: 40–50% 50–60%
U.S. senator before election
Thomas Kuchel
Republican
Elected U.S. Senator
Thomas Kuchel
Republican

The 1954 United States Senate special election in California was held on November 2, 1954 to elect a United States Senator to complete the unexpired term of Richard Nixon, who had resigned on becoming vice president of the United States in 1952 presidential election. Republican interim appointee Thomas Kuchel, won the election over Democratic U.S. representative Sam Yorty.

Primary elections were held on June 8, 1954.

== Background ==
Republican incumbent Richard Nixon was elected vice president of the United States in the 1952 presidential election. He resigned from his seat in the Senate on January 1, 1953, prior to his inauguration as vice president. California governor Earl Warren appointed state controller Thomas Kuchel to the vacant seat until a successor could be duly elected, and a special election to complete the remainder of the term was scheduled for November 2, 1954, concurrent with the 1954 California elections.

== Republican primary ==
=== Candidates ===
- Isobel M. Cerney, teacher and writer (cross-filing)
- William T. Hooley, fireman
- Thomas Kuchel, interim U.S. senator
- Sam Yorty, U.S. representative from Los Angeles (cross-filing)

==== Results ====
Republican primary results
Party	Candidate	Votes	%
Republican	Thomas Kuchel	1,118,312	88.57
Democratic	Sam Yorty	100,746	7.98
Republican	William T. Hooley	32,684	2.59
Independent–Progressive	Isobel M. Cerney	10,826	0.86
Total votes		1,262,568	100.00

== Democratic primary ==
=== Candidates ===
- Isobel M. Cerney, teacher and writer (cross-filing)
- Adam C. Derkum, accountant and unsuccessful candidate for Senate in 1946
- Leo Gallagher, lawyer and perennial candidate
- Thomas Kuchel, interim U.S. senator (cross-filing)
- Sam Yorty, U.S. representative from Los Angeles

=== Results ===
Democratic primary results
Party	Candidate	Votes	%
Democratic	Sam Yorty	829,977	52.38
Republican	Thomas Kuchel	455,530	28.75
Democratic	Leo Gallagher	168,970	10.66
Democratic	Adam C. Derkum	103,484	6.53
Independent–Progressive	Isobel M. Cerney	26,667	1.68
Total votes		1,584,628	100.00

== Independent–Progressive primary ==
=== Candidates ===
- Isobel M. Cerney, teacher and writer

=== Results ===
Independent–Progressive primary results
Party	Candidate	Votes	%
Independent–Progressive	Isobel M. Cerney	3,405	100.00
Total votes		3,405	100.00

== General election ==
=== Results ===

1954 United States Senate special election in California
Party	Candidate	Votes	%
Republican	Thomas Kuchel (Incumbent)	2,090,836	53.21
Democratic	Sam Yorty	1,788,071	45.50
Independent–Progressive	Isobel M. Cerney	50,506	1.29
None	Scattering	255	0.01
Majority		302,765	7.71
Turnout		3,929,668	
Republican hold			

== See also ==
- 1954 United States Senate elections

== Bibliography ==
- Compiled by Frank M. Jordan, Secretary of State (1940). State of California. Statement of Vote. Direct Primary Election June 8, 1954. California State Printing Office.
- Compiled by Frank M. Jordan, Secretary of State (1940). State of California. Statement of Vote. General Election November 2, 1954. California State Printing Office.
- Congressional Elections, 1946-1996. California, D.C.: Congressional Quarterly Inc. 1998. ISBN 1-56802-248-4.
- Barclay, Thomas S. (December 1954). "The 1954 Election in California". The Western Political Quarterly. 7 (4). University of Utah on behalf of the Western Political Science Association: 597–604. doi:10.2307/442809. JSTOR 442809.
