= 1965 Los Angeles mayoral election =

- April 6, 1965

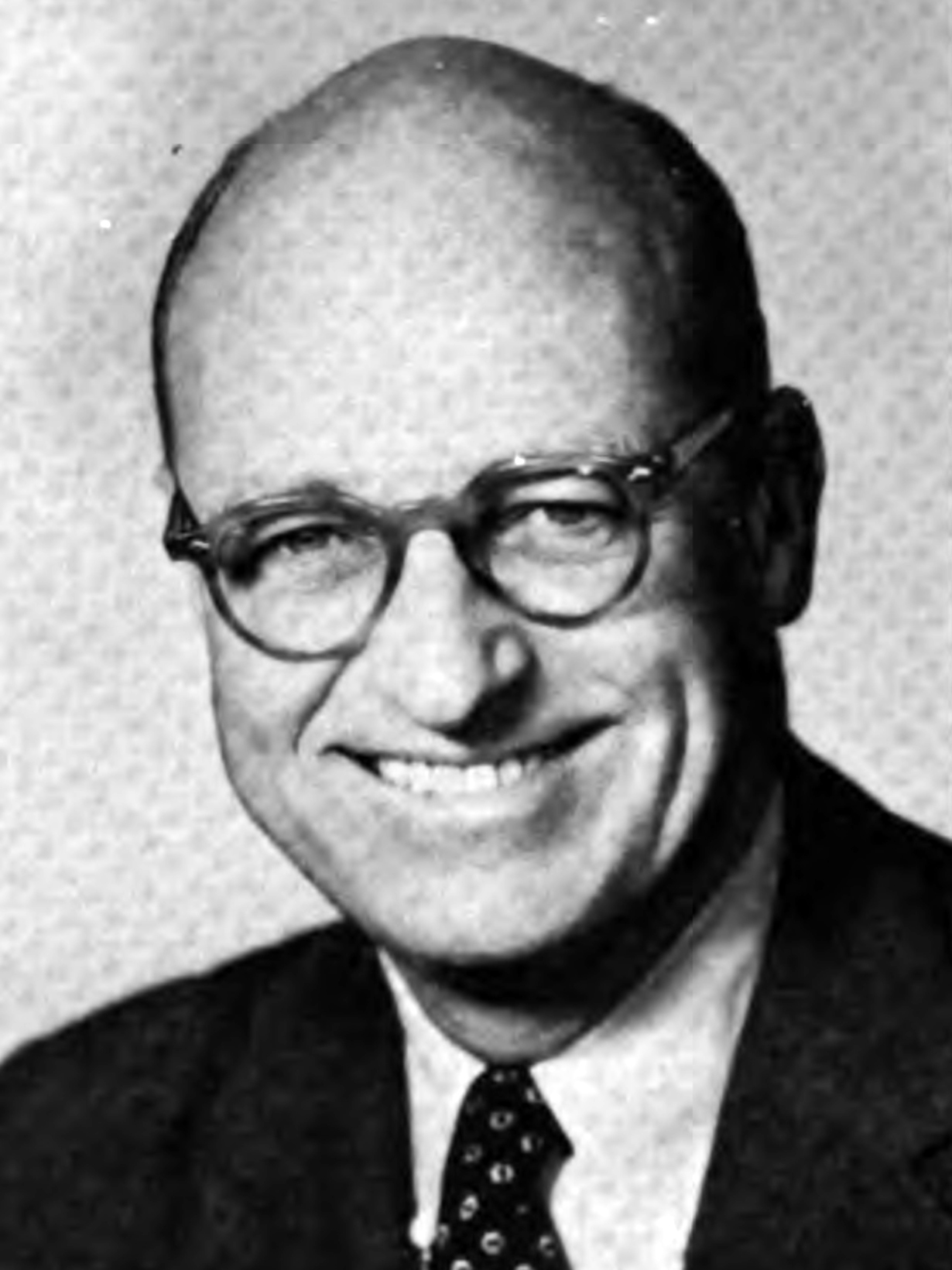
Candidate	Sam Yorty	James Roosevelt
Popular vote	392,775	247,313
Percentage	57.93%	36.48%
Mayor before election
Sam Yorty
Democratic
Elected Mayor
Sam Yorty
Democratic

The 1965 Los Angeles mayoral election took place on April 6, 1965. Incumbent Sam Yorty was re-elected over James Roosevelt and six other candidates in the primary election.

Municipal elections in California, including for mayor of Los Angeles, are officially nonpartisan; candidates' party affiliations do not appear on the ballot.

== Candidates ==
- James F. Bolger
- Socrates Chrisoheris
- Oscar G. Coover, candidate for mayor in 1961
- Joseph W. Hawthorne
- Patrick D. McGee, former member of the Los Angeles City Council and California General Assembly and candidate for mayor in 1961
- James Roosevelt, former U.S. representative and son of former United States president Franklin D. Roosevelt
- James A. Ware
- Sam Yorty, incumbent mayor since 1961

== Campaign ==
During the campaign, James A. Ware criticized both Yorty and Roosevelt for favoring "federal intervention in city affairs" and "federal encroachment", while City Councilmember Billy G. Mills criticized Roosevelt for disenfranchising minority groups. McGee was criticized by Yorty for running to split the vote. Roosevelt was backed by the Los Angeles County Federation of Labor and AFL–CIO, criticizing Yorty on his memberships of a "racially segregated private club" and his leadership. Yorty hit back with criticisms of Roosevelt's spendings and outside spending for his campaign. In the primary election, Yorty won outright and defeated Roosevelt with a majority of the vote.

== Results ==
Los Angeles mayoral general election, April 6, 1965
Candidate	Votes	%
Sam Yorty (incumbent)	392,775	57.93
James Roosevelt	247,313	36.48
Patrick D. McGee	32,605	4.81
James A. Ware	1,728	0.26
James F. Bolger	1,446	0.21
Socrates Chrisoheris	915	0.14
Joseph W. Hawthorne	696	0.10
Oscar G. Coover	491	0.07
Total votes	677,969	100.00
