= Thad F. Brown =

Los Angeles chief of police (1902–1970)

Thaddeus Franklin Brown
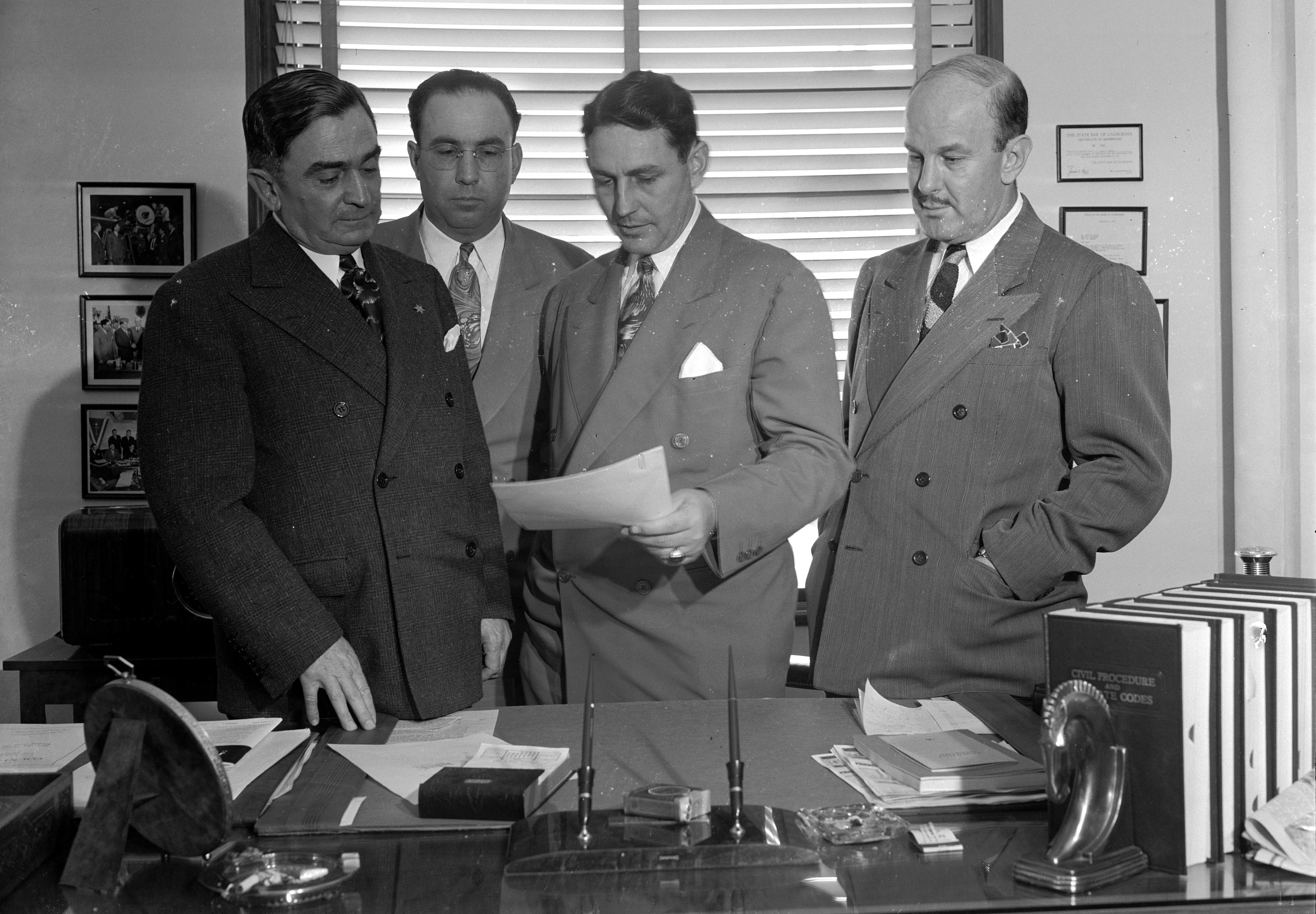
- Brown (second from left) in 1943, discussing the Zoot Suit riots
- Born: December 7, 1902; Greenfield, Missouri, U.S.
- Died: October 9, 1970 (aged 67); Los Angeles, California, U.S.
- Police career
- Country: United States
- Department: Los Angeles Police Department
- Service years: 1926–1968
- Rank: Sworn in as Officer (1926) Chief of Police (July 18, 1966–February 18, 1967)
- Badge no.: 869

Thaddeus Franklin Brown (December 7, 1902 – October 9, 1970) was the police chief of the Los Angeles Police Department from July 18, 1966, to February 17, 1967. Brown, who was the LAPD's Chief of Detectives, was appointed police chief on July 18, 1966, following Chief William H. Parker's death on July 16, 1966. Brown was succeeded by Thomas Reddin on February 17, 1967. His brother, Finis Brown, was also on the LAPD, and was one of the noteworthy police officers who investigated the Elizabeth Short murder, also known as the Black Dahlia murder.

== Early life ==
Brown was born on December 7, 1902 in Greenfield, Missouri to Finis Edward Brown and his wife, Berta, the daughter of a local farmer, horse breeder and Dade County Collector. He was the grandson of Thaddeus S. Brown, a pastor at Greenfield Cumberland Presbyterian Church. By 1904, the family moved to Sarcoxie, Missouri, where he attended grade school. Brown moved to Los Angeles, California in 1924, where he worked several jobs, including a laborer for oil, a swamper, hod carrier and tractor driver. He decided to apply for a job with the Los Angeles Police Department or the Los Angeles Fire Department. The Los Angeles Police Department hired Brown on January 11, 1926. The Fire Department followed with an offer three days later, but was declined.

== Police career ==
Brown was a member of the sixth ever police academy class for the Los Angeles Police Department, which was held at the 77th Street Police Station. After graduating from the police academy, he became a beat officer, patrolling on foot and worked on directing traffic in the area at 10th Street (now Olympic Boulevard) and Figueroa Street. Brown received his first commendation by a member of the Los Angeles Harbor Commission wrote the then Chief James E. Davis about his excellent work at the intersection. In 1928, his station was moved to Watts, where he would later join the Watts Chamber of Commerce.

After six years in Watts, Brown became part of the homicide squad and by 1937 became a sergeant. Promotions were quick to follow, reaching lieutenant in 1940 and the captain of detectives in 1943. He reached the deputy chief level on February 15, 1946, taking charge of the patrol bureau at the Los Angeles Police Department, and in 1949 took over the detective bureau.

One of the closest colleagues to Chief William H. Parker, Brown was named as Parker's replacement when the latter suffered a heart attack on July 17, 1966, resulting in his death. Brown noted that he would take the job on only a temporary basis until a new chief was picked, noting that he did not want the job as chief permanently. While waiting for a new chief to be appointed in January 1967, Brown noted that he wanted more time for himself, compared to the requirements of being the Acting Police Chief. Brown hinted to the press that he would soon retire after over four decades at the Los Angeles Police Department. On February 2, 1967, the department approved Thomas Reddin to become the new police chief on February 18, replacing Brown. Reddin stated that Brown, who announced he would remain with the department, would be offered a job as an administrative aide if he wanted it.

Brown received the Distinguished Service Award from the Los Angeles Board of Public Works at Los Angeles City Hall on March 13, 1967. Brown, back in his position as Chief of Detectives, announced his retirement on December 6, 1967, to be effective in January 1968, deciding to spend more time with his family.

== Retirement and death ==
Thad Brown suffered with health issues since surgery in early 1970. On the evening of October 8, 1970, Brown complained of pain in his spine and issues breathing at his home in the La Crescenta section of Los Angeles. Soon after, he fell unconscious. His wife and his son, the latter of whom served as a police sergeant for the Los Angeles Police Department took Brown to Glendale Adventist Hospital. Brown died at the hospital at 12:50 a.m. on October 9. The Los Angeles City Council closed early in honor of Brown and Mayor of Los Angeles Sam Yorty announced that flags across the city would be lowered to half-mast. Brown's funeral occurred on October 13 with 1,500 people in attendance, including police, newspapermen and boxers. A bookie also attended the funeral. Brown's pallbearers included Thomas Reddin, John Powers, Robert Perry, Robert Tucker, Frank Beeson and William Ojers of the Los Angeles Police Department. 50 members of the police department and California Highway Patrol officers on motorcycle guided the hearse to Forest Lawn Memorial Park's Hollywood Hills cemetery.

== Portrayal in media ==
- In James Ellroy's 2014 novel, Perfidia, a fictionalized version of Thad Brown is portrayed as a supporting character.
- Brown's name was frequently mentioned on Dragnet in the early years, especially on the radio program: Detective Joe Friday's self-introduction would include "the boss is Thad Brown, chief of detectives." Brown also makes an uncredited cameo as himself in the 1954 film. In season one episode 1 of the Dragnet television show aired in December 1951, Thad Brown was portrayed by Raymond Burr.
  - In the early seasons of the 1980s TV spoof Mathnet, Thad Brown is parodied as Thad Green, played by James Earl Jones.
- With Brown's approval, this speech was put into his mouth by Dragnet creator Jack Webb for an episode of the show that dealt with police corruption. It was often reprinted in newspapers, and read at police academies at the time:

THAD: (UP, MAD) Sit down in that chair, you crooked little bum. It's time somebody read you off. It's time you got wise to what you are.

CROOKED COP PAUL: I wanna fair deal, that's all, Chief. I can hand over the whole gang to you.

THAD: Now let me tell you something, Eastman. I wouldn't take you up on that if it meant 50 years before we reached that gang. I wouldn't take you up on that if it meant my job. You get this through your head, Mister. You're a bad cop. You wanna know what that means? What it really means? I can tell you a thousand ways. I'll only use a couple. This isn't a private affair. You're a bad cop. You're a lousy one. You'll be all over the front pages tonight and tomorrow morning. Everybody's gonna read about you. A bad cop. It makes great news. They're not gonna read about 4-thousand 5-hundred other cops...the guys you think are poor dumb slobs.....the honest cops who walked their beats last night....the guys who risked their lives, who did their jobs the way they were trained and the way they're hired to do. People aren't gonna read about them. They ain't gonna read about the Fridays and the Romeros...the rookies pounding their feet flat out in the sticks...the traffic boys on the motorcycles...the men in R & I or the Crime Lab crew or the guy in robbery who stopped 2 slugs last night. They're not gonna read about them on the front page. They're not gonna read about millions of man-hours turned in by thousands of honest cops...here and all over the country. People ain't gonna read about cops who worked 40 honest years....the Donahoes and the Steeds and the MacCaulleys and the Wisdoms and the Tetricks and all the rest of 'em. They're not gonna read about the 98 percent, Mister. They're gonna read about you. One crooked, thieving cop. He worked with a burglary gang. He had an apartment for a beautiful dame and a beautiful fur coat. And he was a cop. And he had a nice wife, and he had two children. Do you know what it means? Every kid in school with a cop for a father will have to fight his way out today because of you. Every woman with a cop for a husband is gonna go shopping at a market today. And she'll have to answer to the butcher and the grocer and every one of her neighbors because of you. Every cop in this city and across the country is gonna have to stand trial because of you. We could've piled up a hundred years of great policemen and great detectives...men with honor and brains and guts...and you, you crooked little bum, you've torn down every best part of 'em. The people who read it in the papers, they're gonna overlook the fact that we got you...that we washed our own laundry, and we cleared the thing up. They're going to overlook all the good. They're gonna overlook all the good...they'll overlook every last good cop in the country. But they'll remember you, you bum. Because you're a bad cop. Because you're a bad cop.

(BEAT) Book him in, Friday.

Police appointments
Preceded by William H. Parker	Chief of LAPD; 1966–1967	Succeeded by Thomas Reddin
