= Angela Masson =

American pilot, inventor, and artist

- Born: Gayl Angela Masson; 1951 (age 74–75); Los Angeles, California, U.S.
- Education: University of Southern California (PhD, 1976)
- Aviation career
- First flight: 1967; Cessna 150

Gayl Angela Masson (born 1951) is an American aviator, inventor, and artist. She flew for American Airlines for over 30 years and was the first woman licensed to fly the Boeing 747 as captain. Masson earned a PhD from the University of Southern California in 1976, specializing in aerospace safety and writing her dissertation on the Air Force's response to women as pilots. She set several speed records for commercial air routes and was the first woman to serve as Chief Pilot for American Airlines.

Masson has taught aeronautics at Jacksonville University and Embry-Riddle Aeronautical University. She patented the Electronic Kit Bag, the first true electronic flight bag. She is also a painter and a musician, recording the 1982 album Jet Lady under the name Tangela Tricoli.

== Early life and education ==
Gayl Angela Masson was born in 1951 at Good Samaritan Hospital in Los Angeles, California. She was the first child of Margo and Jack Masson, a cardiologist and aviator. Masson graduated from Collegio Monte Rosa in Territet.

Masson started attending the University of Southern California when she was 15. She attended the school from 1967 to 1976, earning her BFA, MA, MPA and PhD. She majored in Public Administration with a focus on aerospace safety and systems analysis.

== Flying career ==
Masson began flying lessons at age 15 at Clover Field in Santa Monica, California. She made her first solo flight in a Cessna 150 at Clover Field in 1967. Shortly after earning her pilot's license, she started air racing. At age 21, she flew in the 1972 Powder Puff Derby, and set a record as the youngest person to fly coast to coast in a high-performance aircraft.

Masson trained pilot cadets for the U.S. armed forces at the Claire Walters Flight Academy in 1971, accruing over 1,000 flight hours. She went on to fly as a charter pilot for Express Airways out of Naval Air Station Lemoore on a civilian contract for the Navy. Frustrated to see her former male students flying jets while women were barred from the military, she returned to school to pursue her doctorate. At age 24, she wrote her PhD dissertation "Elements of Organizational Discrimination: The Air Force Response to Women as Military Pilots". The dissertation was entered into the Congressional record by a woman helicopter pilot from the Navy during hearings about opening military academies to women.

Masson's dissertation was read by Robert Crandall, then president of American Airlines, who hired her as a pilot for the airline in 1976, at age 25. During her career there, she was the first woman to fly as First Officer on the Boeing 707, 767 and Douglas DC-10.

Masson earned aircraft type-ratings on the Airbus A310, Boeing 747, 757, 767, 777, DC-9, DC-10, and MD-11. She holds the ATP license with commercial glider and seaplane endorsements, as well as flight engineer, ground and flight instructor certificates. She became the first woman to be type-rated on the Boeing 747 on June 30, 1984.

Masson has set eight world speed records, including several for commercial air routes in the Boeing 777 that she set from 2001 to 2004. The Fédération Aéronautique Internationale lists her numerous Commercial Air Route Speed Awards.

Flying as Captain for over 20 years, she was the first female Chief Pilot for American Airlines (Miami domicile, 1997). As the most senior female pilot, she retired with over 31 years total service in December 2007. She was a founding member of the International Society of Women Airline Pilots and served as Chairwoman from 2009 to 2011. In 2018, she was inducted into the California Aviation Hall of Fame.

== Academic career ==
Masson is an assistant professor of aeronautics at Jacksonville University. From 2016 to 2020 she was an adjunct professor at Embry-Riddle Aeronautical University. She also taught at the St. Augustine High School Aerospace Academy.

== Art ==
A gifted artist and painter, at the age of 18, 52 of her oil paintings were shipped to Italy and shown at a series of solo exhibitions in Italy. Her mother called the paintings interesting, describing them as "Big Einstein faces with three eyes. Don't ask me." Two of the paintings were rented for the set of the 1995 film The Perez Family. She also worked as a go-go dancer in Italy in 1969.

Masson briefly hosted The Tangela Tricoli Talk Show on public access TV in Los Angeles. She also sang and recorded the 1982 album Jet Lady under the name "Tangela Tricoli". The album was re-released in 2004 by Arf! Arf! Records.

== Patents ==
In 1999, Masson patented the first true electronic flight bag, a computing device designed specifically to replace a pilot's entire kit bag, as the Electronic Kit Bag (EKB). Her multiple patents describe a solution to aid pilots in their normal aviation activities, however, the EKB is intended to also function as a life-saving control device, able to land an aircraft remotely in the event of pilot incapacitation.

== Personal life ==
Masson lives in St. Augustine, Florida. She was a candidate in the 1981 Los Angeles mayoral election, campaigning for a "vacuport system" for commuters next to the freeway. Her daughter Athena is a broadcast/research meteorologist and tropical cyclone specialist. Her sister, Lisa Masson, is a physician and Medical Director at Cedars Sinai in Los Angeles. Masson owns a Scottish Aviation Bulldog.
