= Richard B. Richards =

American politician

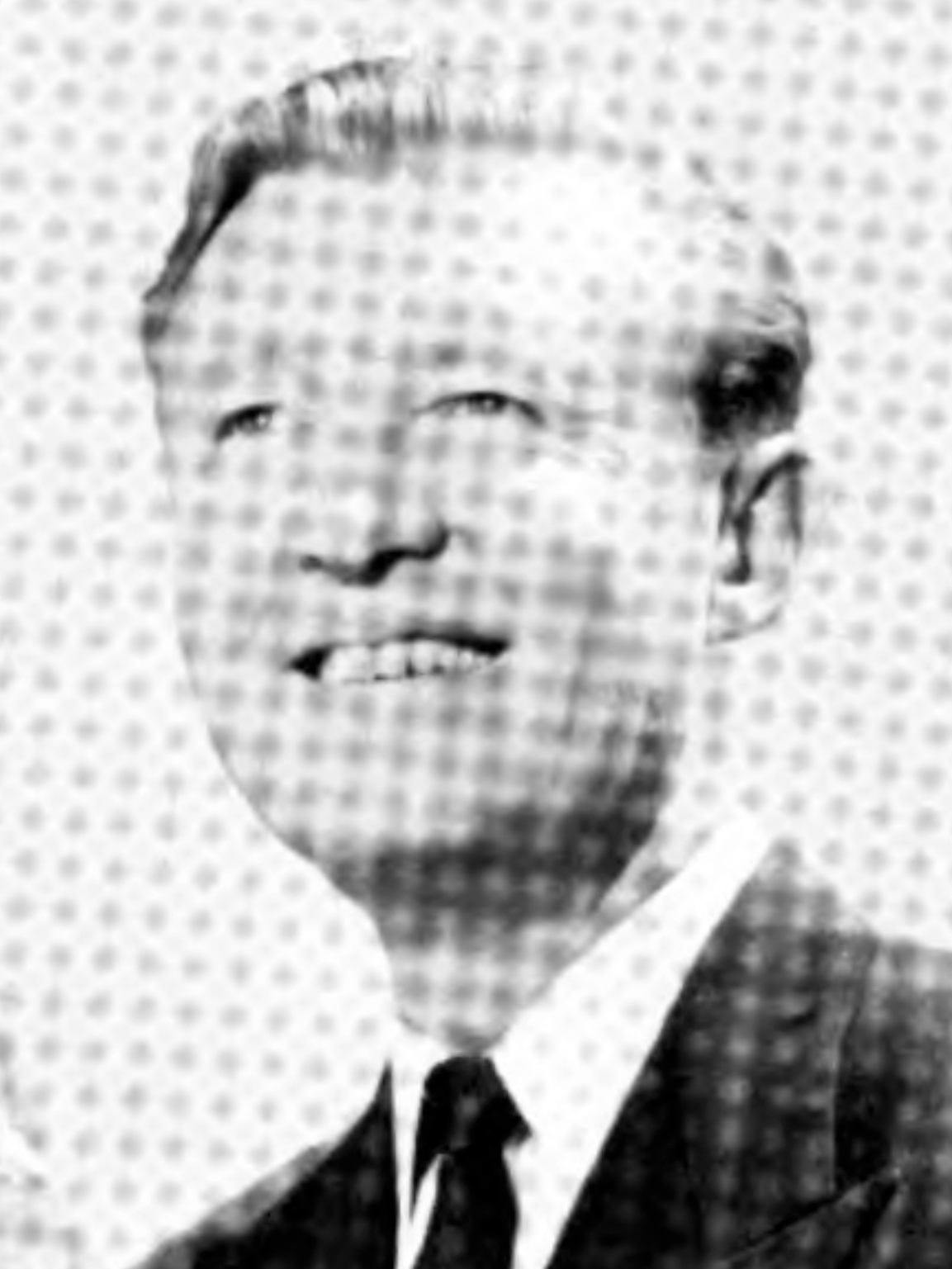
- Official portrait, 1958

Member of the California State Senate from the 38th district
- In office January 3, 1955 – January 7, 1963
- Preceded by: Jack Tenney
- Succeeded by: Thomas M. Rees

Personal details
- Born: December 9, 1916 Cedar Rapids, Iowa, U.S.
- Died: November 30, 1988 (aged 71) Los Angeles, California, U.S.
- Party: Democratic

Richard B. Richards (December 9, 1916 – November 30, 1988) was an American politician. He served as a Democratic member for the 38th district of the California State Senate, and twice was the Democratic nominee for the United States Senate from California.

== Life and career ==
Richards was born in Cedar Rapids, Iowa. He moved with his family as a child to southern California, and during his political career was a resident of San Gabriel. Richards received his undergraduate and law degrees from the University of Southern California.

In 1954, Richards was elected to represent the 38th district of the California State Senate, succeeding Jack Tenney. Prior to United States Supreme Court decisions banning the practice, state senators in California were elected from districts consisting of one, two or three counties. The 38th district was all of Los Angeles County, and with about 6 million constituents Richards represented more people than any other state legislator in the United States. He served in the state Senate until 1963, when he was succeeded by Thomas M. Rees, who went on to serve in the United States House of Representatives.

In 1956 and 1962, Richards was the Democratic nominee for California's Class 3 seat in the United States Senate. Both times he was defeated by Republican incumbent Thomas H. Kuchel.

In 1960, the Democratic National Convention was held in Los Angeles. Richards delivered the Welcoming Address opening the convention.

After leaving the state Senate, Richards returned to the private law practice he helped found in the early 1950s, becoming a senior partner in the 60-lawyer Los Angeles firm of Richards, Watson & Gershon.

Richards died of cancer at the UCLA Medical Center in Los Angeles, at the age of 71.
