= 1973 Los Angeles mayoral election =

- April 3, 1973 and May 29, 1973

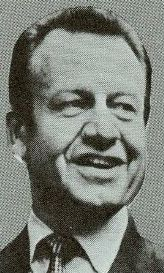

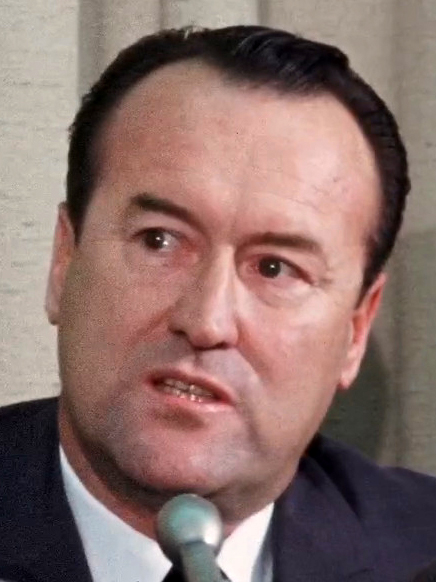
Candidate	Tom Bradley	Sam Yorty
First round	233,789; 35.39%	190,649; 28.86%
Runoff	433,473; 56.34%	335,857; 43.66%
Candidate	Jesse M. Unruh	Thomas Reddin
First round	114,693; 17.36%	83,930; 12.70%
Runoff	Eliminated	Eliminated
Mayor before election
Sam Yorty
Elected Mayor
Tom Bradley

The 1973 Los Angeles mayoral election took place on April 3, 1973, with a run-off election on May 29, 1973. Incumbent Sam Yorty was defeated by councilman Tom Bradley in a rematch of the 1969 mayoral election.

Yorty's growing apathy towards the office of Mayor and his previous tactics against Bradley would be the main points of criticisms towards him, and coupled with Bradley's popularity would lead to his defeat. The election would make Bradley the first African-American mayor of Los Angeles.

Municipal elections in California, including Mayor of Los Angeles, are officially nonpartisan; candidates' party affiliations do not appear on the ballot.

== Candidates ==
- Elieen Anderson
- Ray Bagley
- Tom Bradley, member of the Los Angeles City Council from Leimert Park and candidate for mayor in 1969
- Walter R. Buchanan
- Bob Dornan, real estate businessman, conservative social activist, and Air Force veteran
- Leonard Orr
- Thomas Reddin, former chief of the Los Angeles Police Department
- Olga L. Rodriguez
- Jesse Unruh, former speaker of the California State Assembly and Democratic nominee for governor of California in 1970
- Joel Wachs, member of the Los Angeles City Council from Studio City
- James A. Ware
- Malbour L. Watson
- Sam Yorty, incumbent mayor since 1961 and candidate for president of the United States in 1972

== Election ==
Although Yorty was re-elected in 1969, he started to show boredom in his position as Mayor as he had travelled out of the city for most of his tenure. He ran for governor in 1970 and lost to Speaker of the California State Assembly Jesse M. Unruh, later running for the Democratic nomination for President in 1972 before ending his bid before the California primary. Yorty then announced that he was running for Mayor, seeking an unprecedented fourth term in office.

He was again challenged by Councilman Tom Bradley, making his second run for the office, as well as Unruh, LAPD Chief Thomas Reddin, councilmember Joel Wachs, and actor Bob Dornan. Polls frequently had Bradley having a substantial lead over Yorty and the other candidates, although some speculated that Unruh or Reddin could advance to the primary with Bradley instead of Yorty. In the primary, Bradley and Yorty advanced to the runoff election again, setting the stage for a rematch of the 1969 mayoral election.

In the ensuing campaign, Bradley criticized Yorty for visiting convicted income tax evader Josn Alessio alongside Phil Regan, who would later be convicted of bribery; Yorty attacked Bradley for allegedly "accepting loans tied to gambling interests." Polls showed Bradley leading Yorty in the race, although Yorty discounted the polls as he had won the previous election with polls showing the same thing. This time, however, Bradley defeated Yorty to become Mayor, ending Yorty's tenure of 12 years. After his loss, Yorty changed his party affiliation from Democrat to Republican in September 1973.

== Results ==
=== Primary election ===
Los Angeles mayoral primary election, April 3, 1973
Candidate	Votes	%
Tom Bradley	233,789	35.39
Sam Yorty (incumbent)	190,649	28.86
Jesse M. Unruh	114,693	17.36
Thomas Reddin	83,930	12.70
Joel Wachs	24,907	3.77
Bob Dornan	4,849	0.73
Olga L. Rodriguez	2,326	0.35
Ray Bagley	2,118	0.32
Eileen Anderson	1,037	0.16
Malbour L. Watson	792	0.12
Walter R. Buchanan	685	0.10
Leonard Orr	555	0.08
James A. Ware	371	0.06
Total votes	660,701	100.00

=== General election ===
Los Angeles mayoral general election, May 29, 1973
Candidate	Votes	%
Tom Bradley	433,473	56.34
Sam Yorty (incumbent)	335,857	43.66
Total votes	769,330	100.00

== In popular culture ==
The failed mayoral campaign of Joel Wachs is a central plot element of the 2022 film Licorice Pizza, in which Wachs is portrayed by Benny Safdie.
