= Sam Yorty =

American politician (1909–1998)

- Official portrait, c. 1960s

37th Mayor of Los Angeles
- In office July 1, 1961 – July 1, 1973
- Preceded by: C. Norris Poulson
- Succeeded by: Tom Bradley

Member of the U.S. House of Representatives from California
- In office January 3, 1951 – January 3, 1955
- Preceded by: Helen Gahagan Douglas
- Succeeded by: James Roosevelt
- Constituency: 14th district (1951–53); 26th district (1953–55)

Member of the California State Assembly from the 64th district
- In office April 5, 1949 – January 8, 1951
- Preceded by: John C. Lyons
- Succeeded by: Patrick D. McGee
- In office January 4, 1937 – January 6, 1941
- Preceded by: John D. McCarthy
- Succeeded by: Roger Alton Pfaff

Personal details
- Born: October 1, 1909 Lincoln, Nebraska, U.S.
- Died: June 5, 1998 (aged 88) Los Angeles, California, U.S.
- Party: Democratic (until 1973); Republican (from 1973)
- Spouse: Elizabeth Louise Hensel (m. 1938)
- Children: William

Military service
- Allegiance: United States
- Branch/service: United States Army Air Corps
- Rank: Captain
- Unit: Intelligence Corps
- Battles/wars: World War II Pacific Theater

Samuel William Yorty (October 1, 1909 – June 5, 1998) was an American politician, attorney, and radio host from Los Angeles, California. He served as a member of the United States House of Representatives and the California State Assembly, but he is most remembered for his turbulent three terms as the 37th mayor of Los Angeles from 1961 to 1973. Although Yorty spent almost all of his political career as a Democrat, he became a Republican in 1973.

== Early life ==
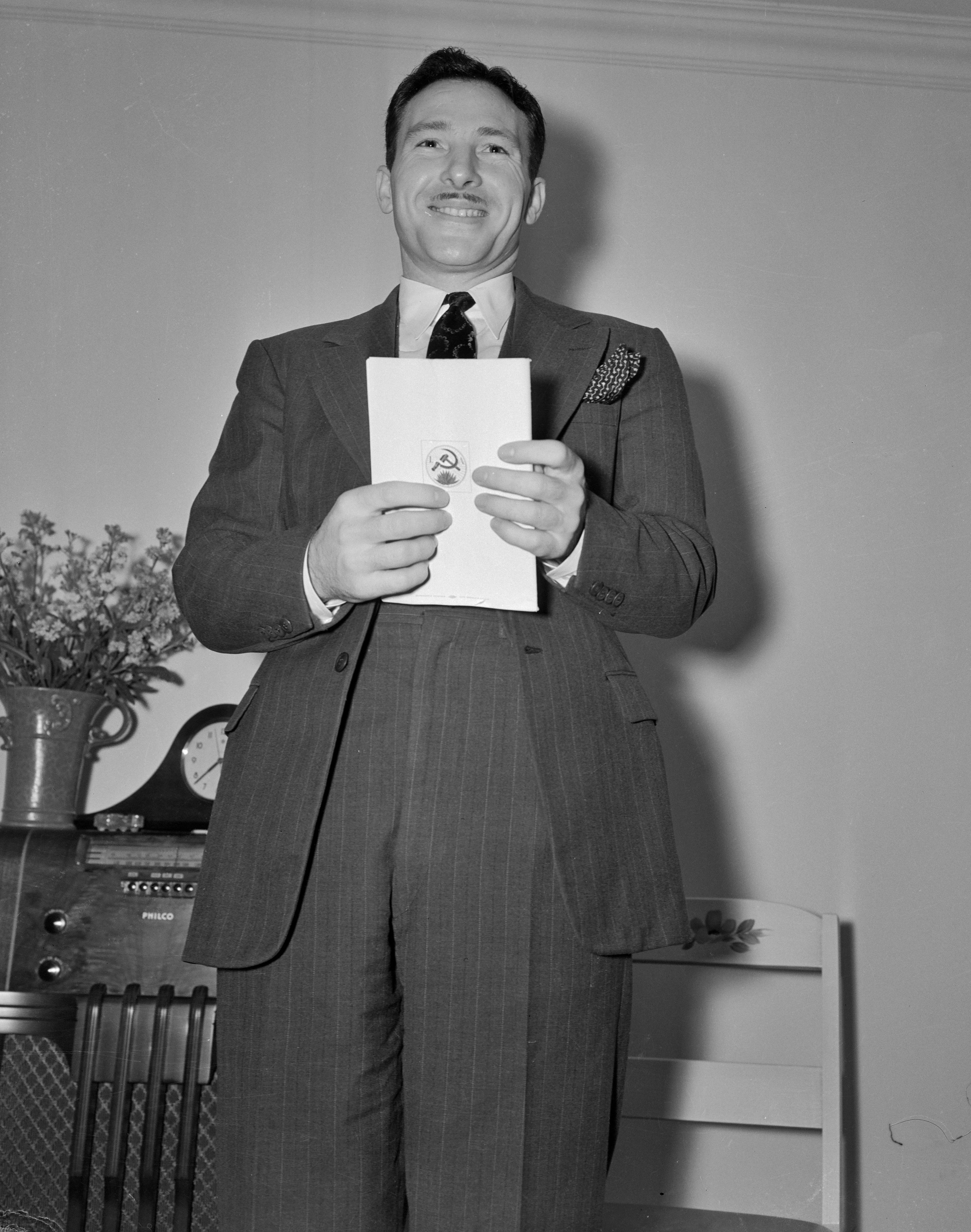
Yorty as a California State Assemblyman in 1940

Sam Yorty was born and raised in Lincoln, Nebraska, the son of Frank Patrick and Johanna (Egan) Yorty. His paternal grandfather was Pennsylvania Dutch, while the rest of his ancestors were Irish, his mother being a native of Clonmel, Ireland. He began his political education as the son of a Democratic father in a Republican state, with a mother who also showed a strong interest in politics. The family moved to Southern California when Yorty completed high school. He retained his Midwestern inflection and was known for pronouncing the city's name as /lɒs ˈæŋɡəliːz/ los-ANG-gə-leez (with a hard "G").

Yorty enrolled at Southwestern University and later the University of California at Los Angeles, working for a time at the Los Angeles Department of Water and Power. He was admitted to the bar in 1939. He married Elizabeth Louise Hensel on December 1, 1938. They had one son, William Egan.

Elected as a Democrat to the California State Assembly in 1936, Yorty established himself as a politician with integrity, but watched his popularity plummet when he reported a bribery attempt on a pending bill. Yorty advocated state ownership of public utilities and strong labor unions, showing a liberal approach to politics. His support of the Republicans in Spain's civil war against General Francisco Franco and his fight against using the California Highway Patrol to end labor strikes helped earn him support of the local Communist Party United States of America organization. That support haunted Yorty in 1938, when he was branded a communist by Folsom Prison inmate Arthur Kent during testimony before the House Un-American Activities Committee. Kent, who claimed to have been a local membership chairman of the Communist Party, proved to be untrustworthy and Yorty was vindicated. That episode, plus the refusal of the local Communist Party to endorse him for mayor of Los Angeles that year, began a shift of Yorty's political beliefs.

Losing a 1940 bid for U.S. Senator, when he ran unsuccessfully as a liberal internationalist against isolationist Republican and longtime incumbent Hiram Johnson, Yorty left politics during World War II to serve in the United States Army Air Corps in the Pacific Theater, attaining the rank of captain in the Intelligence Branch. After his discharge, he was reelected to his Assembly seat in a special election. He was elected to the United States House of Representatives in 1950 and was reelected in 1952, but again lost his race for the U.S. Senate in 1954. In the special election for the remaining two years of Richard M. Nixon's term, Yorty received 1,788,071 votes (45.5%) to Senator Thomas H. Kuchel's 2,090,831 (53.2%). Kuchel, a liberal Republican, had been appointed to the seat in 1953 by then-Governor of California Earl Warren when Nixon became vice president.

== Mayoralty ==
Yorty, left, and newspaper publisher Chester L. Washington debate charges of police brutality during a panel discussion in Los Angeles on August 22, 1965.

In 1960, Yorty endorsed fellow Californian Richard Nixon over Massachusetts Senator and fellow Democrat John F. Kennedy for president. This angered many in the Democratic Party.

Although municipal elections in California are non-partisan, the resources of the party were directed against him when he ran for mayor of Los Angeles the following year against incumbent Republican Norris Poulson. The bitter campaign was marked by Poulson's claim that Yorty was backed by members of organized crime, a comment that caused Yorty to sue Poulson for $3.3 million.

Yorty narrowly prevailed, however, running as a populist. He railed against "a little ruling clique" of "downtown interests" and promised to revise the city charter, which had become unwieldy with the city's growth from a quiet West Coast town to the third largest metropolis in the country. He was a strong advocate of expanding the freeway network. Perhaps his most popular promise was to end residents' sorting of wet and dry garbage; dry garbage was typically burned in backyard incinerators which contributed to the city's notorious smog. There had been two independent collections: wet garbage (including food waste), and bottles and cans; dry combustible trash was burned in incinerators until Los Angeles County ordered an end to backyard trash burning in 1957, when Poulson was still mayor. After that, there were three collections: wet garbage, bottles and cans, and dry garbage.

He made good on his waste management and highway promises, and oversaw the emergence of Los Angeles as a major city. He was a backer of the Los Angeles Music Center, business districts such as Little Tokyo, and of the Los Angeles Zoo. He also made frequent appearances on The Tonight Show Starring Johnny Carson, which boosted his popularity. At the same time, he was a passionate anti-Communist, a critic of the Civil Rights Movement, and an outspoken opponent of desegregation busing and feminism.

In 1965, Yorty was reelected over Democratic Congressman James Roosevelt, son of the late President Franklin D. Roosevelt. Roosevelt's campaign put up hundreds of billboards, handed out bales of bumper stickers and buttons, appeared often on television with 15-minute and half-hour shows, and was featured in so many other spots that his large presence in electronic media was criticized. Roosevelt's campaign cost around $450,000, but Yorty spent less than half that amount. Roosevelt called Yorty a stooge of Democrat Jesse "Big Daddy" Unruh, the controversial California Assembly speaker. He attacked Yorty's membership in a segregated private club and repeatedly criticized Yorty for having a bad temper. The often-irascible Yorty held his temper throughout the campaign, seeming almost cool in contrast to Roosevelt. He pointed to the fact that he had cut city taxes, streamlined city government and improved garbage pickups. He outpolled Roosevelt 392,775 (57.9 percent) to 247,313 (36.5 percent), with the remainder of votes going to six other candidates on the ballot.

Although Yorty was the first mayor to have a female deputy, Marion W. La Follette, and the first to have a racially integrated staff, his appeal did not extend to most of the city's large African-American population.

Community frustrations with high unemployment and racism motivated the Watts Riots of August 11–17, 1965. Yorty's administration was criticized for failing to cooperate with efforts to improve conditions in neighborhoods such as Watts; the United States Civil Rights Commission condemned Yorty for alleged insensitivity towards racial minorities and "gross negligence" towards the African-American majority Watts neighborhood. Not long after this, Yorty categorically rejected any criticism of the city's police or fire departments, and blamed other leaders raising false hopes in communities such as Watts and of action by Communist agitators for having motivated the riots. In August 1966, Yorty's reputation faced further harm when liberal United States Senators Abraham Ribicoff and Robert F. Kennedy heavily criticized Yorty for his administration's treatment of the Watts neighborhood.

After the riots, Yorty challenged incumbent Democratic Governor Edmund G. (Pat) Brown in the 1966 gubernatorial primary. He received 981,088 votes (37.6%) to Brown's 1,355,262 (51.9). Yorty's politics shifted toward the right. This change became evident when he joined the election-night celebration of Brown's successful opponent, Ronald W. Reagan. Yorty went to Vietnam to support the American troops and was thereafter dubbed "Saigon Sam" by his liberal opponents.

In 1967, Yorty was forced to deal with a scandal after the Los Angeles Times published an exposé on the city's harbor commission. The investigation led to the indictment and conviction of four city commissioners for bribery, while another was found dead in Los Angeles Harbor. The newspaper, which had long feuded with the mayor, noted that all of the individuals had been appointed by Yorty.

Support among the white middle classes fell after Yorty was embroiled in the controversy following the 1968 assassination of Robert F. Kennedy at the Ambassador Hotel. Yorty outraged prosecutors in the case by freely commenting on the evidence. Kennedy had told his supporters only moments before he was shot, "Mayor Yorty has just sent me a message that we've been here too long already."

During the fall of 1968, Yorty refused to endorse Democratic presidential candidate Hubert Humphrey. The strategy behind this approach was that Yorty would be rewarded with a cabinet post by Richard Nixon for his lack of support of Humphrey, but Nixon declined to offer him a position in the new administration. Continuing their adversarial relationship, the Times published an editorial cartoon by Paul Conrad lampooning this failure and Yorty responded with an unsuccessful lawsuit.

In the 1969 mayoral primary, Yorty's popularity slipped well below that of Los Angeles City Council member Tom Bradley. The ensuing campaign between Yorty and Bradley, directed for Yorty by Henry Salvatori, proved one of the most bitter in the city's history. Yorty painted his opponent as a dangerous radical, alternately of the black power or Communist revolutionary varieties. The charges were not plausible since Bradley had spent much of his career in the Los Angeles Police Department, but they resonated among fearful voters, and Yorty was re-elected.

Despite winning another four years, Yorty showed obvious signs of boredom in his position. He ran again for governor in 1970 but was handily defeated in the Democratic primary by State Assembly Speaker Jesse Unruh, 1,602,690 (61.4 percent) to 659,494 (26.3 percent). Unruh in turn was defeated by Reagan, who secured his second term as governor by a narrower margin than his 1966 majority over Pat Brown. Yorty began to leave all but the most important decisions to his staff.

After spending almost 40 percent of his time away from Los Angeles during the last half of 1971, Yorty announced on November 15 of that year that he was running for the Democratic nomination for president in 1972. Yorty had received strong support from influential Manchester Union Leader publisher William Loeb, stating that President Nixon had "caved in" to anti-war senators and that he had never agreed with the government's policy on the war. In response to the question of what he would do, Yorty noted that Dwight Eisenhower had helped bring an end to the Korean War by threatening to use nuclear weapons.

However, Yorty received just six percent of the vote in the New Hampshire primary and was never able to gain any momentum in his bid for the nomination. He finally ended his bid shortly before the California primary in June 1972, asking voters to support Humphrey because of the "radical" nature of anti-Vietnam War candidate George McGovern. Yorty picked up the support of a young Louisiana delegate to the Democratic convention, Louis E. "Woody" Jenkins. After McGovern won the Democratic nomination for president, Yorty began to support Republicans.

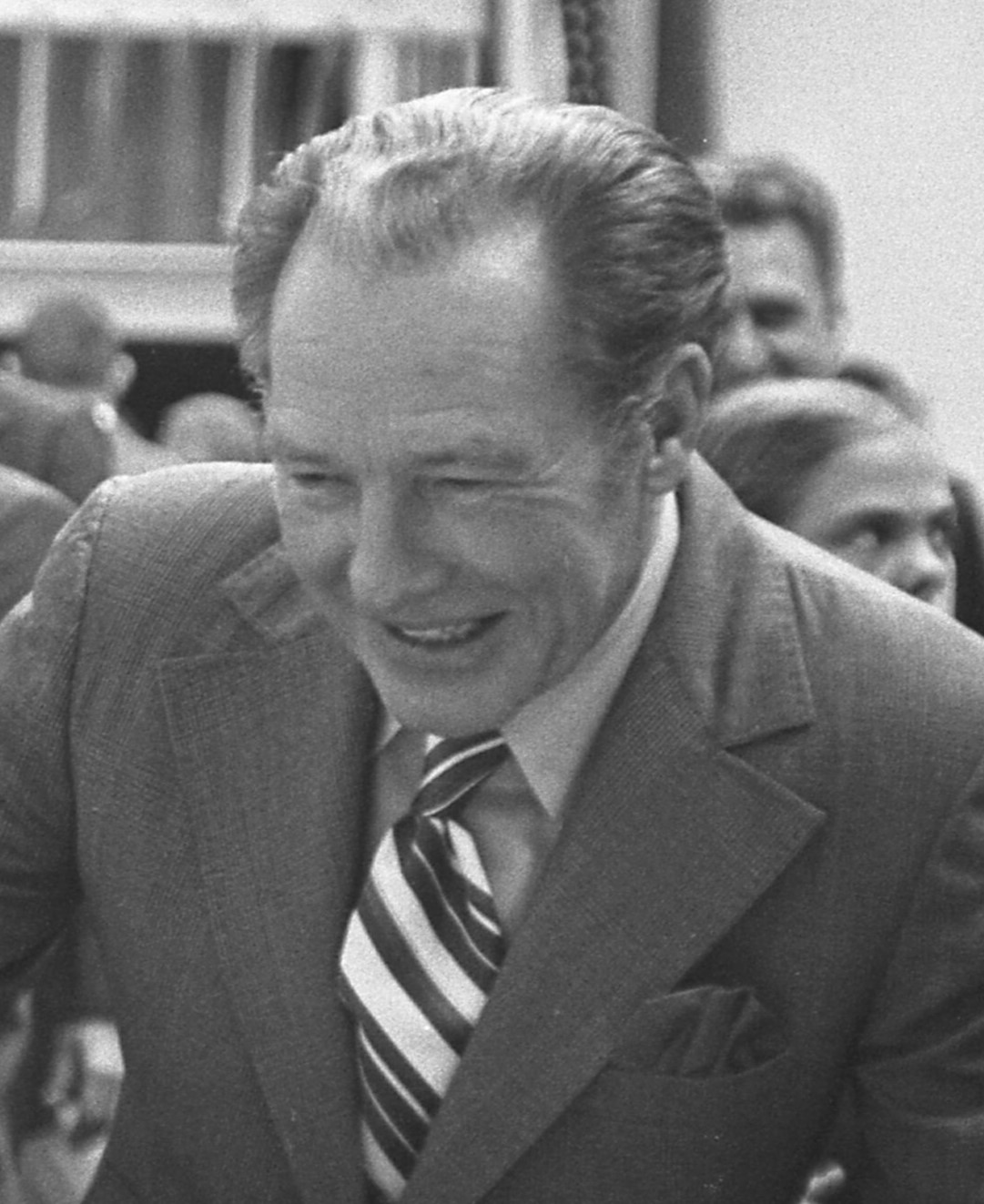
Yorty during his campaign for re-election, 1973

In 1973, Bradley soundly defeated Yorty in a rematch of their 1969 race. In 1974, Yorty ran fourth in another bid for governor in the Democratic primary, far behind then-Secretary of State Jerry Brown, son of Pat Brown.

A 1985 survey of historians, political scientists and urban experts conducted by Melvin G. Holli of the University of Illinois at Chicago ranked Yorty as the third-worst American big-city mayor to have been in office since 1820. A 1993 edition of the same survey saw Wood ranked as ninth-worst.

== Later career ==
After leaving office, Yorty hosted a talk show on KCOP-TV for five years, later complaining that he was canceled in favor of the television program Hee Haw. After leaving work on the small screen, he returned to the political arena, but failed in a comeback bid for the Republican nomination for the U.S. Senate in 1980, having been defeated by the conservative Paul Gann, who in turn was badly beaten by incumbent liberal Democrat Alan Cranston. In 1981, Yorty failed again in a bid to unseat Bradley, losing by a nearly 2 to 1 margin.

Afterward, Yorty retired from public life, aside from being a rainmaker for several law firms.

=== Death ===
He suffered a stroke on May 24, 1998, then contracted pneumonia. After treatment at the Encino-Tarzana Regional Medical Center, he returned to his Studio City home, where he died on the morning of June 5, at the age of 88. Yorty had told his wife that he wanted no funeral service.

== See also ==
- Membership discrimination in California social clubs
- Marguerite P. Justice, the second woman, and the first black woman to be named to the Los Angeles Police Commission, appointed by Yorty.
- City Council President L.E. Timberlake, often the acting mayor while Yorty was away from the state

Party political offices
Preceded by Helen Gahagan Douglas	Democratic nominee for U.S. Senator from California (Class 3); 1954	Succeeded by Richard B. Richards
U.S. House of Representatives
Preceded by Helen G. Douglas	Member of the U.S. House of Representatives from California's 14th congressional district 1951–1953	Succeeded by Harlan Hagen
New district	Member of the U.S. House of Representatives from California's 26th congressional district 1953–1955	Succeeded by James Roosevelt
