= Roger E. Murdock =

Los Angeles police chief in 1969

Roger Eugene Murdock
- Born: July 27, 1909
- Died: July 2, 1995 (aged 85)
- Education: University of Southern California (BA, Public Administration); Los Angeles College of Law
- Alma mater: Los Angeles High School
- Occupation: Police officer
- Years active: 1932–1969
- Known for: Interim LAPD Chief during the Charles Manson murders
- Predecessor: Thomas Reddin
- Successor: Edward M. Davis
- Police career
- Department: Los Angeles Police Department
- Rank: Chief of Police (interim)

Roger Eugene Murdock (July 27, 1909 – July 2, 1995) served as interim LAPD police chief in 1969 after Thomas Reddin had left to pursue a job in the media industry. He graduated from Los Angeles High School and USC, where he earned a degree with honors in public administration. He also studied criminal law and the rules of evidence at Los Angeles College of Law and taught a course at USC called "Investigation of Major Crimes." Murdock joined the LAPD in 1932. He headed the LAPD during the Charles Manson murders.

Roger Murdock was a member of Liberal Arts Masonic Lodge, #677 of Los Angeles, CA.

Police appointments
Preceded by Thomas Reddin	Chief of LAPD; 1969	Succeeded by Edward M. Davis
