= Thomas Kuchel =

American politician (1910–1994)

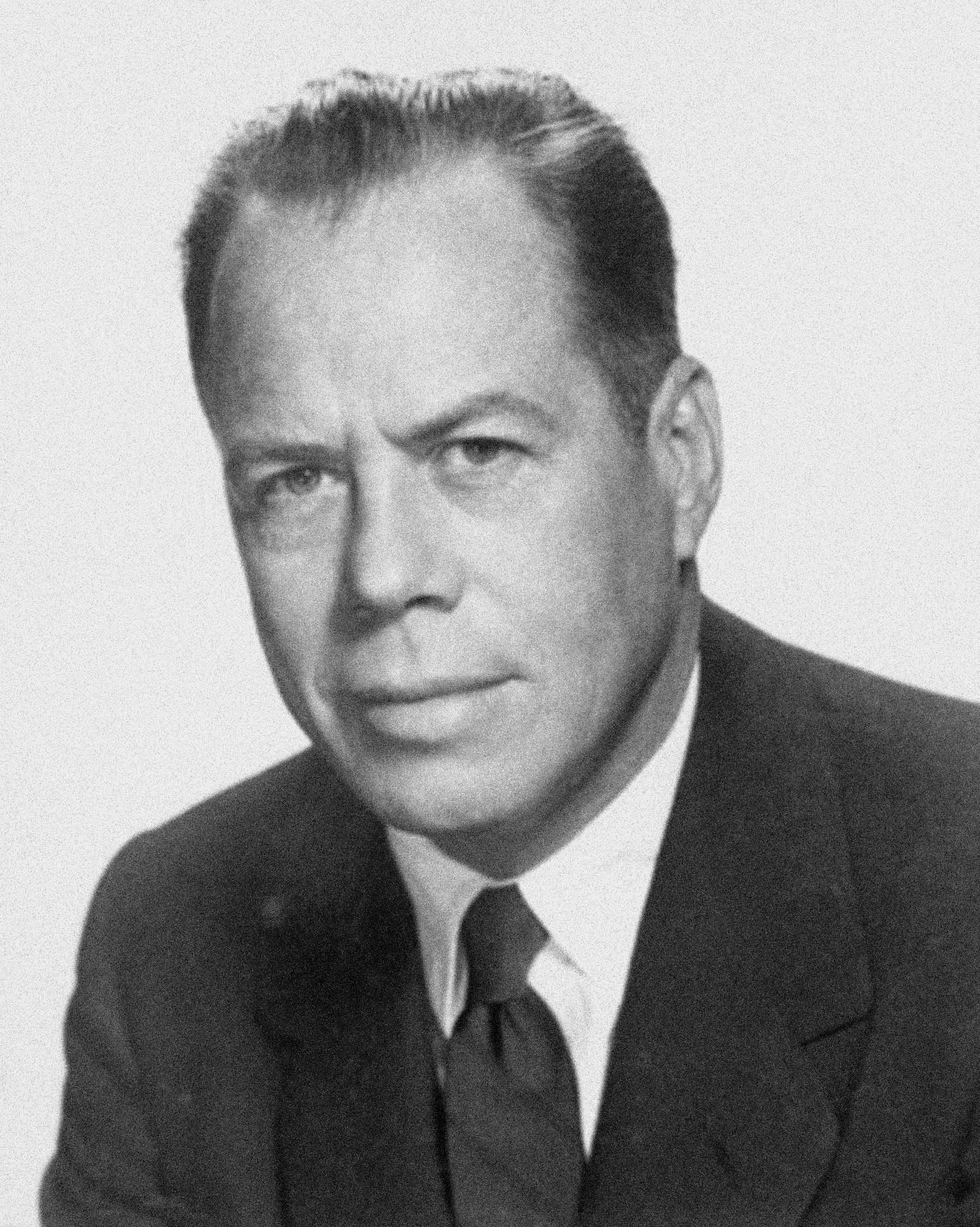
- Kuchel c. 1956

Senate Minority Whip
- In office January 3, 1959 – January 3, 1969
- Leader: Everett Dirksen
- Preceded by: Everett Dirksen
- Succeeded by: Hugh Scott

United States Senator from California
- In office January 2, 1953 – January 3, 1969
- Preceded by: Richard Nixon
- Succeeded by: Alan Cranston

23rd Controller of California
- In office February 11, 1946 – January 2, 1953
- Governor: Earl Warren
- Preceded by: Harry B. Riley
- Succeeded by: Robert C. Kirkwood

Member of the California State Senate from the 35th district
- In office January 6, 1941 – February 11, 1946
- Preceded by: Harry Clay Westover
- Succeeded by: Clyde A. Watson

Member of the California State Assembly from the 75th district
- In office January 4, 1937 – January 6, 1941
- Preceded by: Edward Craig
- Succeeded by: Sam L. Collins

Personal details
- Born: Thomas Henry Kuchel; August 15, 1910 Anaheim, California, U.S.
- Died: November 21, 1994 (aged 84) Beverly Hills, California, U.S.
- Party: Republican
- Spouse: Betty Mellenthin (m. 1942)
- Children: 1
- Education: University of Southern California (BA, LLB)

Military service
- Allegiance: United States
- Branch/service: United States Navy
- Unit: Reserves
- Battles/wars: World War II

Thomas Henry Kuchel (/ˈkiːkəl/ KEE-kəl; August 15, 1910 – November 21, 1994) was an American politician. A moderate Republican, he served as a U.S. senator from California from 1953 to 1969 and was the minority whip in the Senate, where he was the co-manager on the floor for the Civil Rights Act of 1964 and the Voting Rights Act of 1965. Kuchel voted in favor of the Civil Rights Acts of 1957, 1960, and 1964, as well as the 24th Amendment to the U.S. Constitution, the Voting Rights Act of 1965, and the confirmation of Thurgood Marshall to the U.S. Supreme Court, while Kuchel did not vote on the Civil Rights Act of 1968.

== Early life ==
Kuchel was born in Anaheim, Orange County, the son of Henry Kuchel, a newspaper editor and the former Letitia Bailey. Kuchel attended public school as a child. While he was at Anaheim High School, he was student body president, a yell leader and a member of the debate team. While there, he debated a team from Whittier High School, winning his own debate against his opponent and later intraparty rival, Richard Nixon.

Kuchel graduated from both the University of Southern California in 1932, where he was a member of the Phi Kappa Psi fraternity and the University of Southern California Law School before he entered the state government.

== Career ==
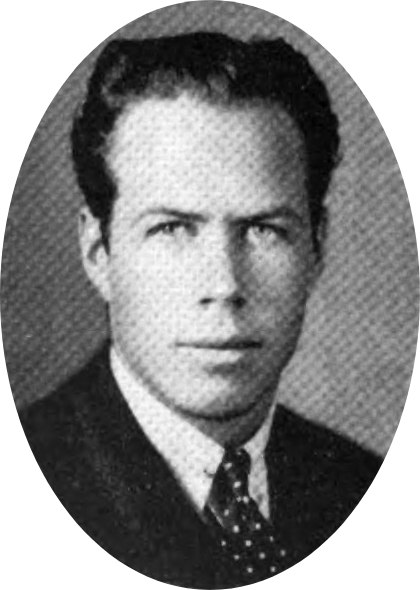
Kuchel's official State Senate portrait, 1942

Kuchel served in the California State Assembly from 1937 to 1941, in the California State Senate from 1941 to 1945, and as California State Controller from 1946 to 1953. During World War II, Kuchel was a lieutenant commander in the U.S. Naval Reserve.

In 1953, Kuchel was appointed to the U.S. Senate by Governor Earl Warren to fill the vacancy created after Republican Senator Richard Nixon was elected Vice President. Kuchel was elected to the remainder of Nixon's term in 1954 and to full terms in 1956 and 1962.

As a U.S. Senator, Kuchel had first attempted to steer clear of the factional infighting within the California Republican Party, which took place in the 1950s between Vice President Nixon, U.S. Senate Republican Leader William F. Knowland, a conservative, and Republican Governor Goodwin J. Knight, a liberal. Known as a moderate, Kuchel eventually backed Knowland in his campaign to oust Knight in the Republican primary for governor in 1958. Knight withdrew his re-election bid and ran for Knowland's Senate seat, but he and Knowland both lost that year.

While running for a second full term in 1962, Kuchel pointedly refused to endorse ticket-mate Nixon's candidacy for governor in a heated race against incumbent Democrat Edmund G. "Pat" Brown Sr. The 1962 election favored incumbents, as Brown beat Nixon by a comfortable margin and Kuchel coasted to victory. To date, Kuchel is the last senatorial candidate to win all 58 California counties in a single election.

However, Kuchel broke with Knowland in 1964 when the latter asked him to endorse Barry Goldwater for the Republican nomination for president, and Kuchel instead endorsed Nelson Rockefeller, who narrowly lost the California presidential primary to Goldwater. During his campaign for Rockefeller, Kuchel warned in campaign ads that control by the right-wing movement of the California Republican party would lead to the destruction of the two-party system.

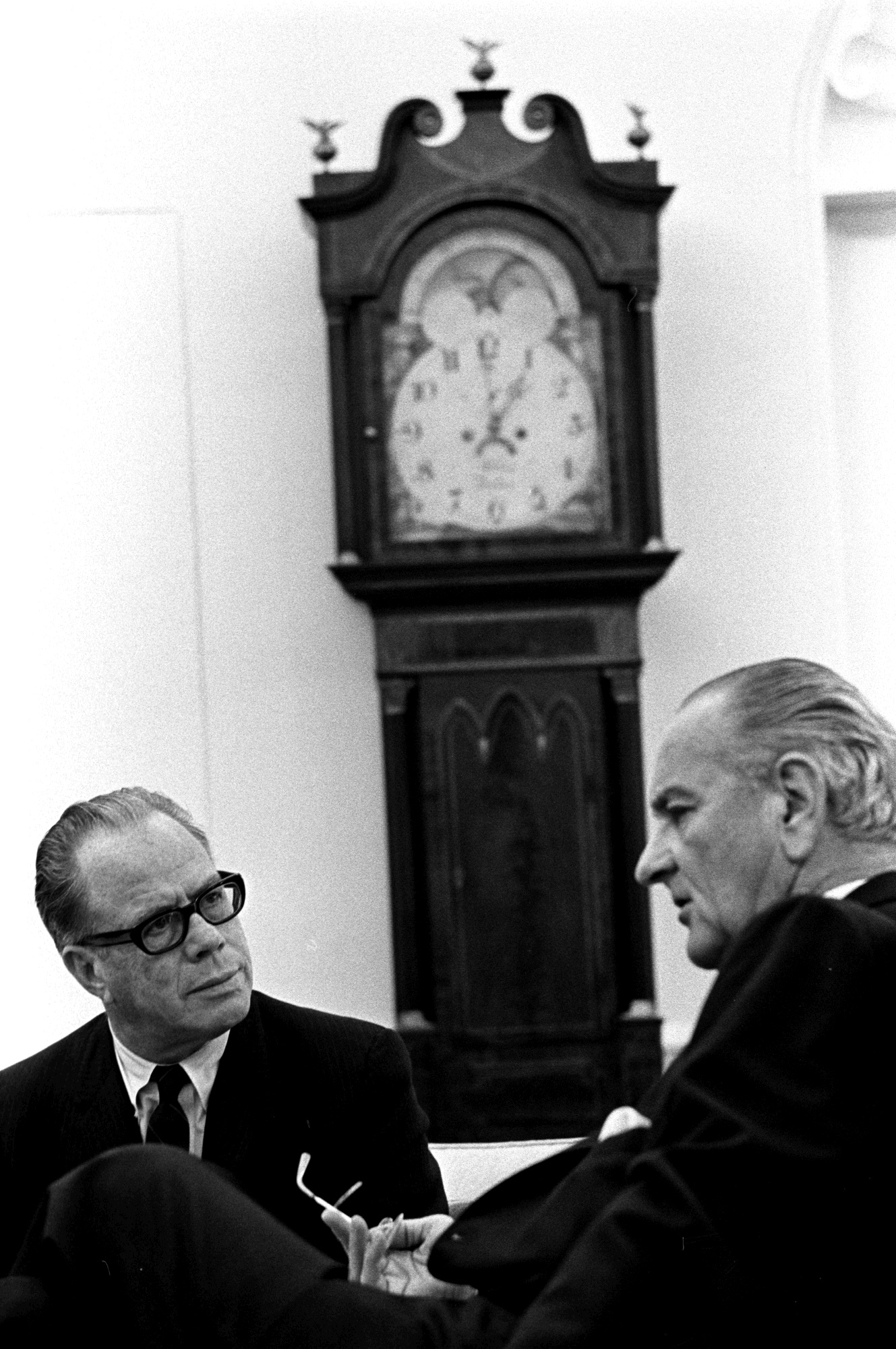
Senator Kuchel with President Lyndon Johnson in the Oval Office, June 1968

While Kuchel was campaigning against Goldwater, a "vicious document" circulated that purported to be an affidavit signed by a Los Angeles police officer, saying that in 1949, he had arrested Kuchel. The document said that the arrest was for drunkenness while Kuchel had been in the midst of a sex act with a man. Four men were indicted for the libel: Norman H. Krause, a bar owner and ex-Los Angeles policeman, who had actually arrested two people in 1950 who worked in Kuchel's office for drunkenness; Jack D. Clemmons, a Los Angeles police sergeant until his resignation two weeks before his arrest; John F. Fergus, a public relations man for Eversharp, who was charged with possession of a concealed weapon and given a suspended sentence in 1947; and Francis A. Capell of Zarephath, New Jersey, the publisher of a right-wing newsletter.

During the 1966 California gubernatorial primary, Kuchel was urged by moderates to run against conservative actor Ronald Reagan. Citing the hostilities of the growing conservative movement, Kuchel decided not to run. He instead issued a negative statement about the conservatives: "A fanatical neo-fascist political cult of right-wingers in the GOP, driven by a strange mixture of corrosive hatred and sickening fear that is recklessly determined to control our party or destroy it!" In May 1963, Kuchel attacked the right-wing movement in the Senate in a speech, describing them as not conservatives, but "radicals with a capital R" and that the movement defiled conservatism.

Kuchel was one of thirteen Republican senators to vote in favor of Medicare. In 1981, he described himself as a progressive Republican, a type of Republican that governs for the many. Kuchel was one of six Senate Republicans to support a repeal of the right-to-work section of the Taft-Hartley Act.

Kuchel was narrowly defeated in the Republican primary in 1968 by conservative state Superintendent of Public Instruction Max Rafferty, who went on to lose the general election to Alan Cranston, the former State Controller, a position that had once been held by Kuchel himself. Kuchel returned to California and moved to Beverly Hills, where he practiced law until his retirement in 1981.

He was appointed by the Supreme Court to represent the appellee in United States v. 12 200-ft. Reels of Film.

== Death ==
He died of lung cancer on November 21, 1994, in Beverly Hills.

== Legacy ==
Secretary of Defense and former White House Chief of Staff and CIA Director Leon Panetta began in politics as a legislative assistant to Kuchel. Panetta would cite Kuchel as "a tremendous role model."

On August 17, 2010, the Beverly Hills City Council paid tribute to Senator Kuchel on the 100th anniversary of his birth. His widow Betty Kuchel and daughter Karen Kuchel accepted a proclamation from then Councilman and now mayor William Warren Brien, a grandson of Governor Earl Warren, at the council meeting.

California Assembly
Preceded by Edward Craig	Member of the California Assembly from the 75th district 1937–1941	Succeeded by Sam L. Collins
Political offices
Preceded by Harry B. Riley	Controller of California; 1946–1953	Succeeded by Robert C. Kirkwood
U.S. Senate
Preceded by Richard Nixon	United States Senator (Class 3) from California; 1953–1969; Served alongside: William Knowland, Clair Engle, Pierre Salinger, George Murphy	Succeeded by Alan Cranston
Preceded by Everett Dirksen	Senate Minority Whip; 1959–1969	Succeeded by Hugh Scott
Party political offices
Preceded by Richard Nixon	Republican nominee for U.S. Senator from California (Class 3); 1954, 1956, 1962	Succeeded by Max Rafferty
Preceded by Everett Dirksen	Senate Republican Whip; 1959–1969	Succeeded by Hugh Scott
Preceded by Everett Dirksen; Gerald Ford	Response to the State of the Union address 1968; Served alongside: Howard Baker, George H. W. Bush, Peter Dominick, Gerald Ford, Robert Griffin, Mel Laird, Bob Mathias, George Murphy, Dick Poff, Chuck Percy, Al Quie, Charlotte Reid, Hugh Scott, Bill Steiger, John Tower	Vacant Title next held by Donald Fraser, Scoop Jackson, Mike Mansfield, John McCormack, Patsy Mink, Ed Muskie, Bill Proxmire
