= 1989 Los Angeles mayoral election =

- April 11, 1989
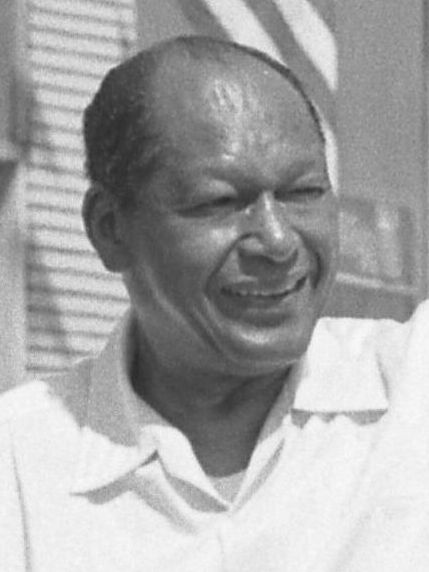

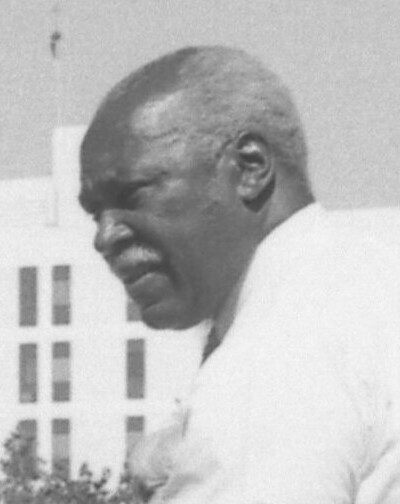

Candidate	Tom Bradley	Nate Holden	Baxter Ward
Popular vote	165,599	89,184	48,923
Percentage	51.90%	27.95%	15.33%
Mayor before election
Tom Bradley
Elected Mayor
Tom Bradley

The 1989 Los Angeles mayoral election took place on April 11, 1989. Incumbent Tom Bradley was re-elected over ten candidates in the primary election. This would be the last time Bradley ran for mayor, as he chose to retire after his fifth term.

Municipal elections in California, including for mayor of Los Angeles, are officially nonpartisan; candidates' party affiliations do not appear on the ballot.

== Candidates ==
- Stewart Alexander, KTYM radio host
- Eileen Anderson, perennial candidate
- Tom Bradley, incumbent mayor since 1973 and Democratic nominee for governor in 1982 and 1986
- Joel Britton
- Khushro Ghandi
- Nate Holden, member of the Los Angeles City Council from Crenshaw and former state senator
- Leonard Miropol
- Maria Elizabeth Muñoz
- Gary Passi
- Raul Reyes
- Baxter Ward, former chair of Los Angeles County and candidate for mayor in 1969

=== Declined ===
- Zev Yaroslavsky, member of the Los Angeles City Council from the Fairfax District

== Election ==
Bradley, now in his fourth term, was slowly declining in popularity during his term due to traffic congestion, air pollution, and commercial development threatening residential neighborhoods in the city. He had also run in the 1986 California gubernatorial election, which he lost again to Republican George Deukmejian in a landslide. Despite this, Bradley announced that he would be running for a fifth term. He faced minimal opposition at the start, with councilman Zev Yaroslavsky declining to run because of a private poll that had Bradley in the lead. Bradley was widely expected to easily win re-election. Councilman Nate Holden and former supervisor Baxter Ward filed late into the filing period, giving Bradley two challengers. Holden, who was a newcomer in the City Council, was able to drive up some votes, and in the primary election gained one-third of the vote.

== Results ==
Los Angeles mayoral general election, April 11, 1989
Candidate	Votes	%
Tom Bradley (incumbent)	165,599	51.90
Nate Holden	89,184	27.95
Baxter Ward	48,923	15.33
Raul Reyes	3,962	1.24
Maria Elizabeth Muñoz	2,843	0.89
Eileen Anderson	2,700	0.85%
Stewart Alexander	2,691	0.84
Joel Britton	1,311	0.41
Khushro Ghandi	1,227	0.39
Leonard Miropol	501	0.16
Gary Passi	147	0.05
Total votes	319,088	100.00
