= 1985 Los Angeles mayoral election =

- April 9, 1985
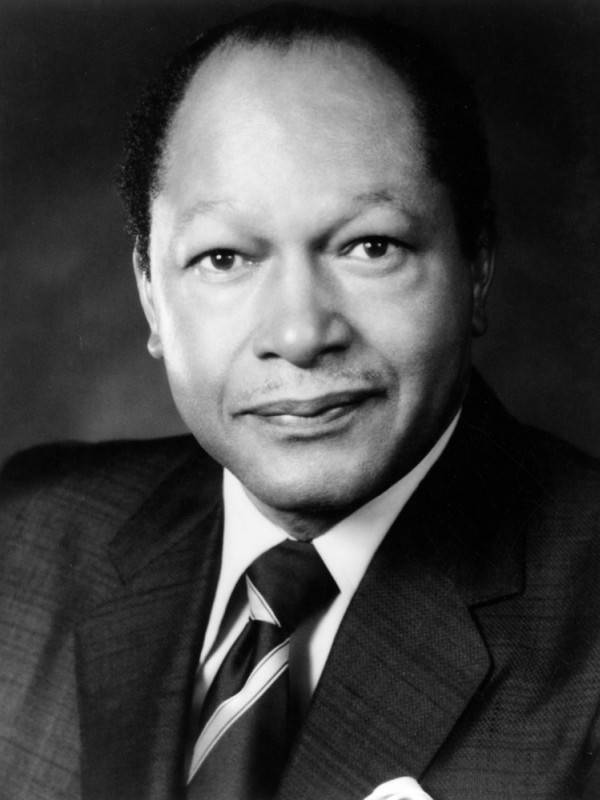

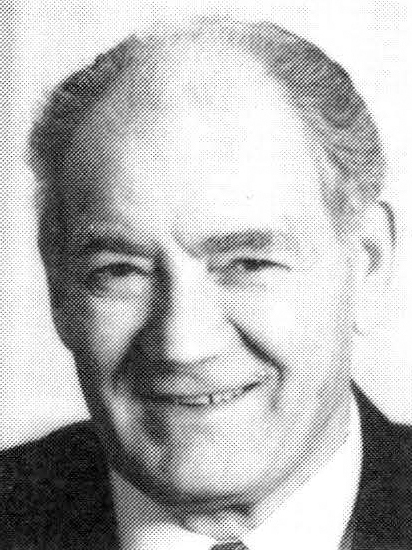
Candidate	Tom Bradley	John Ferraro
Popular vote	313,318	141,499
Percentage	67.61%	30.53%
Mayor before election
Tom Bradley
Elected Mayor
Tom Bradley

The 1985 Los Angeles mayoral election took place on April 9, 1985. Incumbent Tom Bradley was re-elected over councilmember John Ferraro. Bradley's re-election would give him a fourth term, an unprecedented feat in the office as no mayor except for James R. Toberman (from 1878 to 1882) had been re-elected to a fourth consecutive term. (Note: Toberman's tenure was shorter than Bradley's, as mayos only held office for one year.)

== Candidates ==
- Eileen Anderson, perennial candidate
- Tom Bradley, incumbent mayor since 1973 and Democratic nominee for governor in 1982
- Walter R. Buchanan
- Venus De Milo
- John Ferraro, member of the Los Angeles City Council from Hancock Park
- Sal Genovese
- James E. Harris
- Judy L. Huffman
- William Loska

== Campaign ==
Bradley had previously run for Governor of California in 1982, a year after his re-election in 1981, but lost to George Deukmejian. Bradley had been speculated to try for Governor again in 1986, but in January 1985, Bradley announced his run for an unprecedented fourth term. He was mainly challenged by councilman Ferraro, who was viewed as a more moderate option to Bradley. Bradley was widely expected to win re-election, with polls showing Bradley ahead of Ferraro. Polls also showed that Bradley was mostly supported by non-white Democrats while Ferraro was supported by white Republicans, even though both were Democrats. Bradley won outright and won election to a fourth term in office, the first time in Los Angeles history that someone was elected to a fourth full term.

== Results ==
Los Angeles mayoral general election, April 9, 1985
Candidate	Votes	%
Tom Bradley (incumbent)	313,318	67.61
John Ferraro	141,499	30.53
Eileen Anderson	1,899	0.41
William Loska	1,878	0.41
Venus De Milo	1,404	0.30
Walter R. Buchanan	1,126	0.24
Sal Genovese	921	0.20
James E. Harris	730	0.16
Judy L. Huffman	658	0.14
Total votes	463,433	100.00
