= 1986 California gubernatorial election =

- November 4, 1986
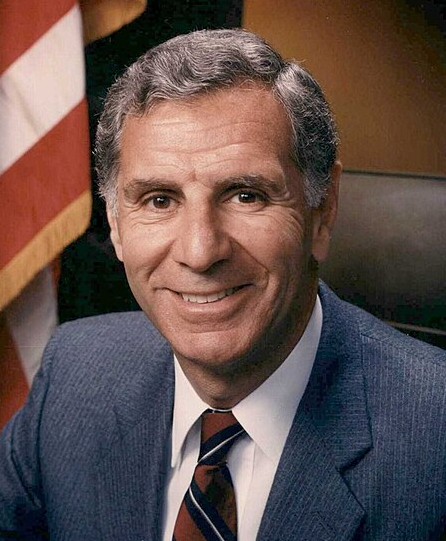

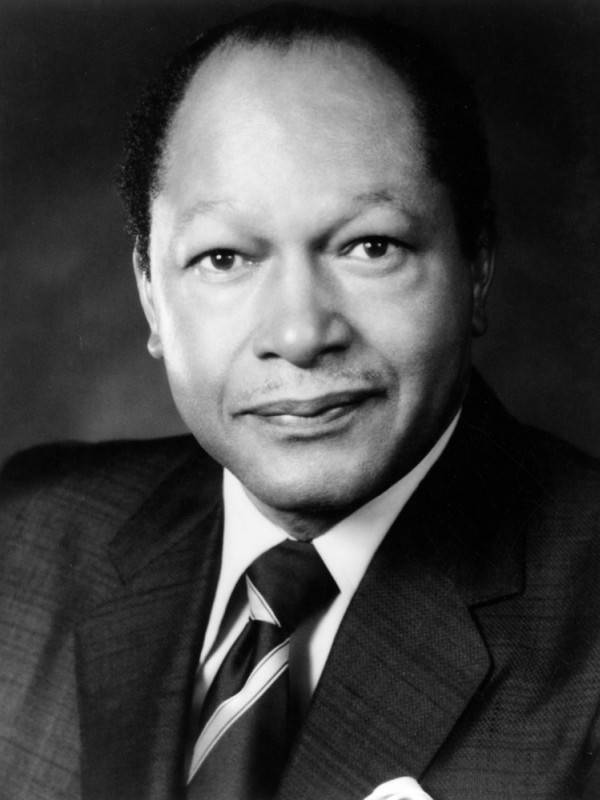
Nominee	George Deukmejian	Tom Bradley
Party	Republican	Democratic
Popular vote	4,505,601	2,781,714
Percentage	60.54%	37.38%
- Deukmejian: 40–50% 50–60% 60–70% 70–80% 80–90% Bradley: 40–50% 50–60% 60–70% 70–80%
Governor before election
George Deukmejian
Republican
Elected Governor
George Deukmejian
Republican

The 1986 California gubernatorial election took place on November 4, 1986. Incumbent Republican George Deukmejian won easily in this rematch over the Democratic challenger, Los Angeles Mayor Tom Bradley.

== Primary election ==
Both major party candidates from 1982 were renominated with only token opposition.

=== Republican Party ===
Republican primary results
Party	Candidate	Votes	%
Republican	George Deukmejian (incumbent)	1,927,290	93.58%
Republican	William H. R. Clark	132,126	6.42%
Total votes		2,059,416	100.00%

=== Democratic Party ===
Democratic primary results
Party	Candidate	Votes	%
Democratic	Tom Bradley	1,768,044	81.53%
Democratic	Hugh G. Bagley	141,218	6.51%
Democratic	Charles Pineda Jr.	109,001	5.03%
Democratic	Eileen Anderson	102,358	4.72%
Democratic	Frank L. Thomas	48,007	2.21%
Total votes		2,168,628	100.00%

=== American Independent Party ===
American Independent primary results
Party	Candidate	Votes	%
American Independent	Gary V. Miller	13,168	100.00%
Total votes		13,168	100.00%

=== Libertarian Party ===
Libertarian primary results
Party	Candidate	Votes	%
Libertarian	Joseph Fuhrig	9,123	100.00%
Total votes		9,123	100.00%

=== Peace and Freedom Party ===
Peace and Freedom primary results
Party	Candidate	Votes	%
Peace and Freedom	Maria Elizabeth Muñoz	3,508	69.78%
Peace and Freedom	Cheryl Zuur	1,519	30.22%
Total votes		5,027	100.00%

== General election results ==
1986 California gubernatorial election
Party	Candidate	Votes	%	±%
Republican	George Deukmejian (incumbent)	4,506,601	60.54%	+11.27%
Democratic	Tom Bradley	2,781,714	37.37%	−10.72%
Libertarian	Joseph Fuhrig	52,628	0.71%	−0.32%
Peace and Freedom	Maria Elizabeth Muñoz	51,995	0.70%	−0.19%
American Independent	Gary V. Miller	50,547	0.68%	−0.04%
	Scattering	66	0.00%	
Majority		1,724,887	23.17%	
Total votes		7,443,551	100.00%	
Republican hold		Swing	+21.99%	

=== Results by county ===
George Deukmejian carried all but two counties. As of 2024, this is most recent election in which a Republican gubernatorial candidate won Marin County, San Mateo County, and Santa Cruz County.

County	George Deukmejian Republican		Tom Bradley Democratic		Joseph Fuhrig Libertarian		Maria Elizabeth Muñoz Peace & Freedom		Gary V. Miller American Independent		Margin		Total votes cast (Note: County totals do not include the write-in votes, which are only given as statewide totals in the Statement Of Vote)
County	#	%	#	%	#	%	#	%	#	%	#	%	Total votes cast
Alameda	174,555	47.79%	181,445	49.68%	3,164	0.87%	3,783	1.04%	2,280	0.62%	-6,890	-1.89%	365,227
Alpine	280	64.22%	128	29.36%	0	0.00%	16	3.67%	12	2.75%	152	34.86%	436
Amador	7,357	74.43%	2,319	23.46%	60	0.61%	56	0.57%	93	0.94%	5,038	50.97%	9,885
Butte	40,546	70.81%	15,518	27.10%	398	0.70%	348	0.61%	448	0.78%	25,028	43.71%	57,258
Calaveras	8,221	74.77%	2,531	23.02%	73	0.66%	75	0.68%	95	0.86%	5,690	51.75%	10,995
Colusa	3,729	79.49%	882	18.80%	16	0.34%	24	0.51%	40	0.85%	2,847	60.69%	4,691
Contra Costa	159,105	63.31%	87,117	34.67%	1,491	0.59%	1,644	0.65%	1,951	0.78%	71,998	28.65%	251,308
Del Norte	4,213	65.80%	2,026	31.64%	42	0.66%	51	0.80%	71	1.11%	2,187	34.16%	6,403
El Dorado	26,068	73.57%	8,605	24.29%	206	0.58%	193	0.54%	361	1.02%	17,463	49.28%	35,433
Fresno	96,959	66.28%	47,071	32.17%	546	0.37%	927	0.63%	795	0.54%	49,888	34.10%	146,298
Glenn	5,728	80.45%	1,246	17.50%	38	0.53%	26	0.37%	82	1.15%	4,482	62.95%	7,120
Humboldt	22,534	54.58%	17,608	42.65%	293	0.71%	491	1.19%	363	0.88%	4,926	11.93%	41,289
Imperial	11,479	61.19%	6,915	36.86%	38	0.20%	214	1.14%	113	0.60%	4,564	24.33%	18.759
Inyo	4,862	71.79%	1,753	25.88%	63	0.93%	45	0.66%	50	0.74%	3,109	45.90%	6,773
Kern	86,547	68.23%	37,973	29.93%	716	0.56%	610	0.48%	1,007	0.79%	48,574	38.29%	126,853
Kings	12,256	69.07%	5,205	29.33%	45	0.25%	125	0.70%	113	0.64%	7,051	39.74%	17,744
Lake	10,994	67.42%	4,904	30.07%	99	0.61%	110	0.67%	199	1.22%	6,090	37.35%	16,306
Lassen	5,154	68.96%	2,067	27.66%	45	0.60%	61	0.82%	147	1.97%	3,087	41.30%	7,474
Los Angeles	1,090,138	52.96%	930,576	45.21%	12,862	0.62%	13,158	0.64%	11,514	0.56%	159,562	7.75%	2,058,248
Madera	12,939	70.55%	4,951	27.00%	54	0.29%	165	0.90%	230	1.25%	7,988	43.56%	18,339
Marin	51,693	56.47%	37,686	41.17%	1,001	1.09%	781	0.85%	379	0.41%	14,007	15.30%	91,450
Mariposa	3,844	70.06%	1,513	27.57%	26	0.47%	45	0.82%	59	1.08%	2,331	42.48%	5,487
Mendocino	13,710	55.96%	10,054	41.04%	209	0.85%	349	1.42%	177	0.72%	3,656	14.92%	24,499
Merced	21,426	68.86%	9,105	29.26%	99	0.32%	199	0.64%	286	0.92%	12,321	39.60%	31,115
Modoc	2,641	74.69%	810	22.91%	25	0.71%	20	0.57%	40	1.13%	1,831	51.78%	3,536
Mono	1,847	70.66%	722	27.62%	15	0.57%	15	0.57%	15	0.57%	1,125	43.04%	2,614
Monterey	46,195	63.30%	25,408	34.81%	414	0.57%	544	0.75%	421	0.58%	20,787	28.48%	72,982
Napa	26,445	68.14%	11,456	29.52%	251	0.65%	282	0.73%	375	0.97%	14,989	38.62%	38,809
Nevada	20,599	73.12%	6,928	24.59%	228	0.81%	182	0.65%	234	0.83%	13,671	48.53%	28,171
Orange	468,092	71.89%	172,782	26.54%	3,445	0.53%	2,821	0.43%	3,956	0.61%	295,310	45.36%	651,096
Placer	37,288	73.31%	12,542	24.66%	372	0.73%	280	0.55%	382	0.75%	24,746	48.65%	50,864
Plumas	4,827	68.19%	2,096	29.61%	36	0.51%	78	1.10%	42	0.59%	2,731	38.58%	7,079
Riverside	155,318	65.10%	78,891	33.06%	947	0.40%	1,092	0.46%	2,350	0.98%	76,427	32.03%	238,598
Sacramento	207,086	68.05%	91,660	30.12%	1,592	0.52%	1,974	0.65%	2,014	0.66%	115,426	37.93%	304,326
San Benito	5,284	66.42%	2,520	31.68%	46	0.58%	60	0.75%	45	0.57%	2,764	34.75%	7,955
San Bernardino	166,483	63.76%	89,584	34.31%	1,206	0.46%	1,336	0.51%	2,490	0.95%	76,899	29.45%	261,099
San Diego	381,094	65.17%	184,395	31.53%	8,769	1.50%	5,390	0.92%	5,126	0.88%	196,699	33.64%	584,774
San Francisco	83,741	37.42%	134,738	60.20%	1,682	0.75%	2,743	1.23%	900	0.40%	-50,997	-22.79%	223,804
San Joaquin	76,297	71.32%	28,817	26.94%	452	0.42%	623	0.58%	793	0.74%	47,480	44.38%	106,982
San Luis Obispo	41,893	67.12%	19,281	30.89%	391	0.63%	382	0.61%	472	0.76%	22,612	36.23%	62,419
San Mateo	121,910	61.84%	71,329	36.18%	1,498	0.76%	1,421	0.72%	987	0.50%	50,581	25.66%	197,145
Santa Barbara	67,852	62.84%	38,046	35.23%	617	0.57%	1,015	0.94%	451	0.42%	29,806	27.60%	107,981
Santa Clara	227,285	59.87%	142,907	37.64%	3,894	1.03%	2,920	0.77%	2,650	0.70%	84,378	22.22%	379,656
Santa Cruz	37,525	50.54%	34,831	46.91%	615	0.83%	839	1.13%	434	0.58%	2,694	3.63%	74,244
Shasta	29,447	71.01%	11,149	26.89%	289	0.70%	206	0.50%	378	0.91%	18,298	44.12%	41,469
Sierra	1,053	66.98%	474	30.15%	7	0.45%	13	0.83%	25	1.59%	579	36.83%	1,572
Siskiyou	10,515	67.95%	4,584	29.62%	103	0.67%	96	0.62%	176	1.14%	5,931	38.33%	15,474
Solano	47,396	63.51%	25,382	34.01%	746	1.00%	513	0.69%	587	0.79%	22,014	29.50%	74,624
Sonoma	75,003	59.43%	47,859	37.92%	1,015	0.80%	1,242	0.98%	1,091	0.86%	27,144	21.51%	126,210
Stanislaus	53,505	71.05%	20,481	27.20%	342	0.45%	417	0.55%	556	0.74%	33,024	43.86%	75,301
Sutter	12,616	78.67%	2,946	18.37%	136	0.85%	75	0.47%	263	1.64%	9,670	60.30%	16,036
Tehama	10,463	71.10%	3,932	26.72%	83	0.56%	75	0.51%	163	1.11%	6,531	44.38%	14,716
Trinity	3,720	66.48%	1,661	29.68%	72	1.29%	59	1.05%	84	1.50%	2,059	36.79%	5,596
Tulare	44,335	71.72%	16,287	26.35%	344	0.56%	334	0.54%	519	0.84%	28,048	45.37%	61,819
Tuolumne	11,121	71.29%	4,237	27.16%	67	0.43%	82	0.53%	92	0.59%	6,884	44.13%	15,599
Ventura	118,640	67.20%	54,893	31.09%	966	0.55%	960	0.54%	1,098	0.62%	63,747	36.11%	176,557
Yolo	26,154	60.79%	15,906	36.97%	308	0.72%	370	0.86%	285	0.66%	10,248	23.82%	43,023
Yuba	8,594	72.37%	2,982	25.11%	71	0.60%	40	0.34%	188	1.58%	5,612	47.26%	11,875
Total	4,506,601	60.54%	2,781,714	37.37%	52,628	0.71%	51,995	0.70%	50,547	0.68%	1,724,887	23.17%	7,443,551

==== Counties that flipped from Democratic to Republican ====
- Humboldt
- Los Angeles
- Marin
- Mendocino
- Monterey
- San Benito
- San Mateo
- Santa Barbara
- Santa Clara
- Santa Cruz
- Sonoma
- Yolo

== See also ==
- Bradley effect
