= 1977 Los Angeles mayoral election =

- April 5, 1977
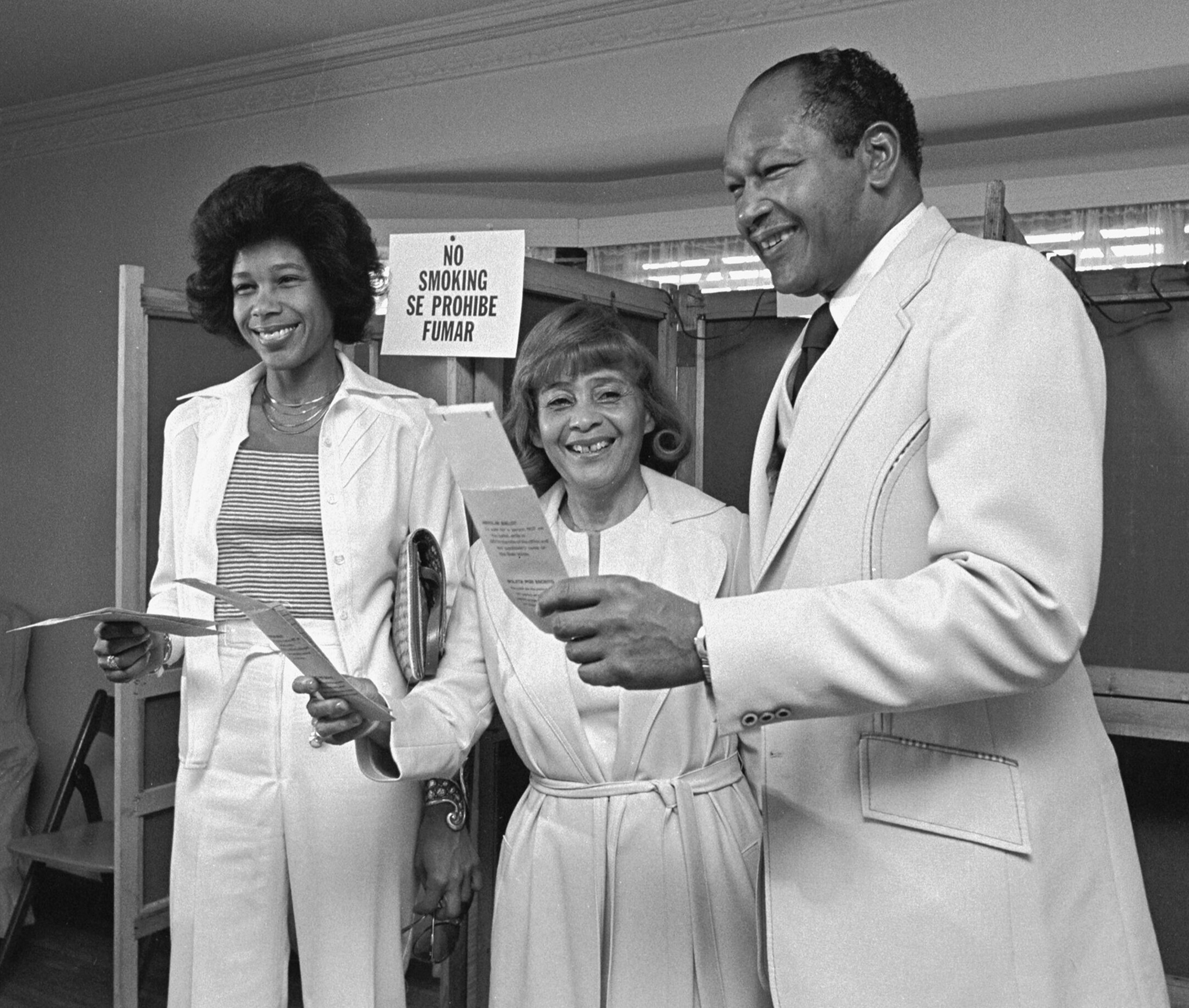

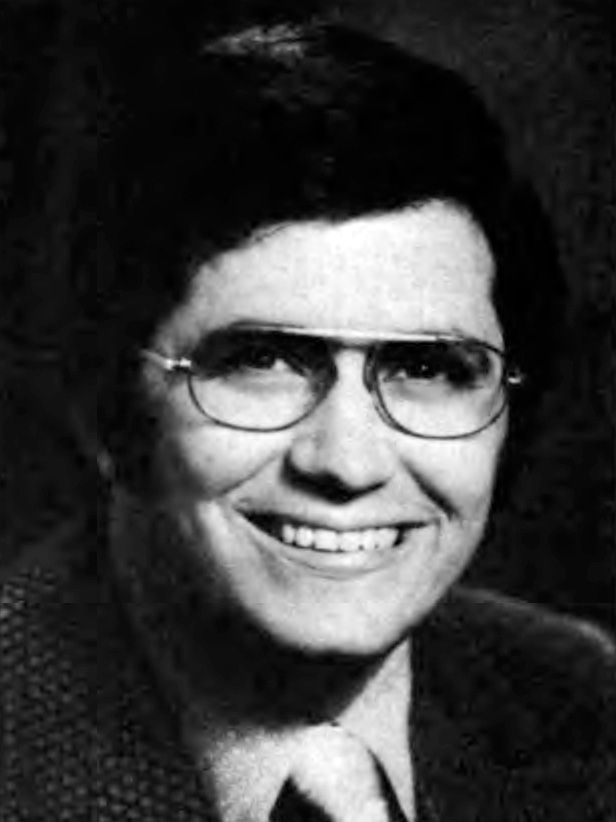

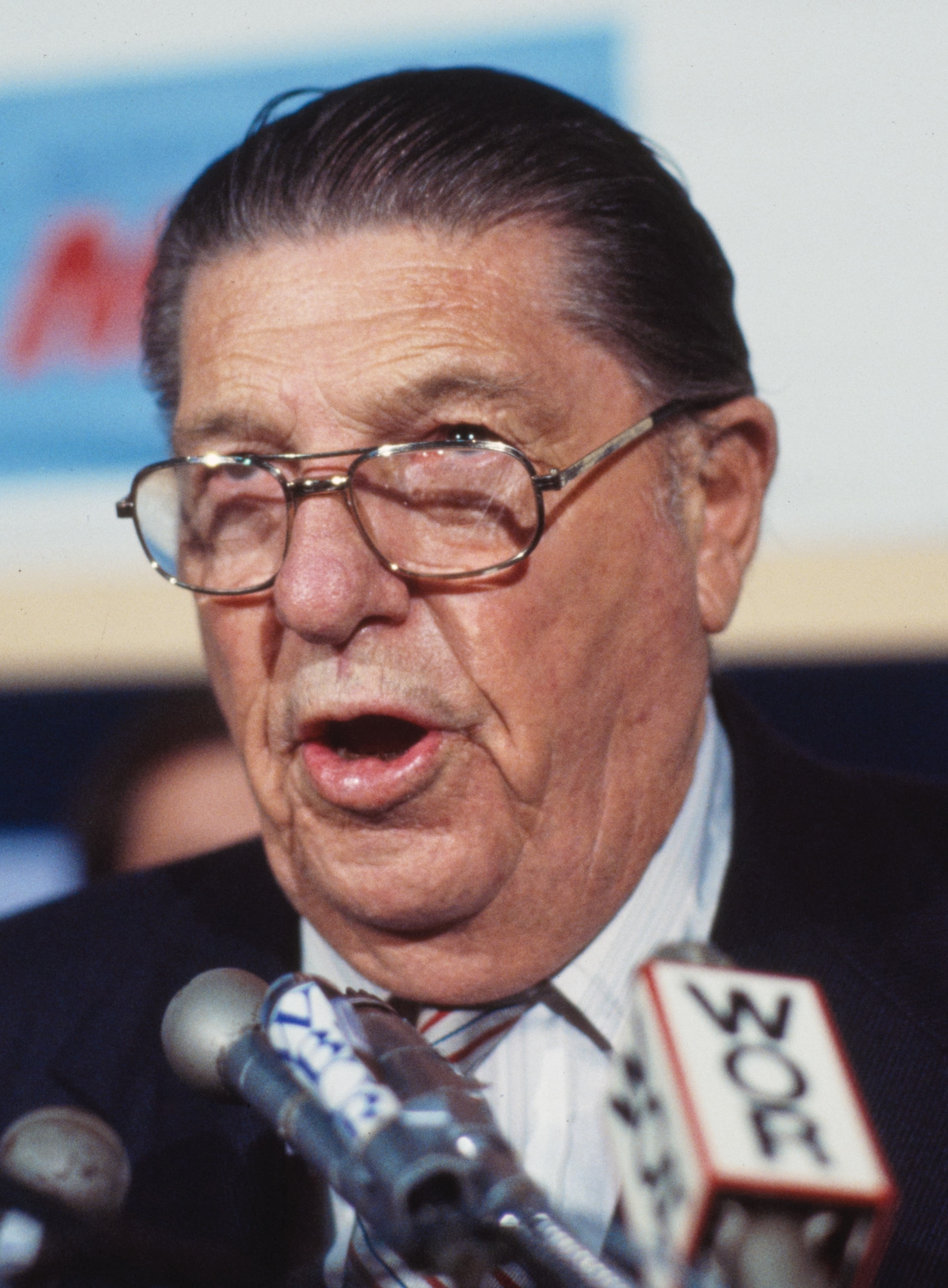
Candidate	Tom Bradley	Alan Robbins	Howard Jarvis
Popular vote	287,927	136,180	47,665
Percentage	59.41%	28.10%	9.83%
Mayor before election
Tom Bradley
Elected Mayor
Tom Bradley

The 1977 Los Angeles mayoral election took place on April 5, 1977. Incumbent Tom Bradley was re-elected over nine other candidates. He was mainly challenged by State Senator Alan Robbins and tax policy activist Howard Jarvis, with Robbins campaigning on his opposition to busing in the city. Bradley was widely expected to easily win re-election, and on election day, Bradley won by a landslide against the other candidates.

Municipal elections in California, including the Mayor of Los Angeles, are officially nonpartisan; candidates' party affiliations do not appear on the ballot.

== Candidates ==
- John Luis Arado
- Gloria Rios Berlin
- Tom Bradley, incumbent mayor since 1973
- Barney Feldman
- Michael A. Hirt
- Howard Jarvis, businessman and anti-tax activist
- Frank Kelley
- Sam Manuel
- Chris Musun
- Alan Robbins, state senator
- Seymour Rosen
- Milo A. Speriglio

== Results ==
Los Angeles mayoral general election, April 5, 1977
Candidate	Votes	%
Tom Bradley (incumbent)	287,927	59.41
Alan Robbins	136,180	28.10
Howard Jarvis	47,665	9.83
Seymour Rosen	3,251	0.67
Frank Kelley	1,931	0.40
Gloria Rios Berlin	1,763	0.36
John Luis Arado	1,601	0.33
Michael A. Hirt	961	0.20
Sam Manuel	917	0.19
Milo A. Speriglio	880	0.18
Barney Feldman	862	0.18
Chris Musun	744	0.15
Total votes	484,682	100.00
