= Tom Bradley (mayor) =

American politician (1917–1998)

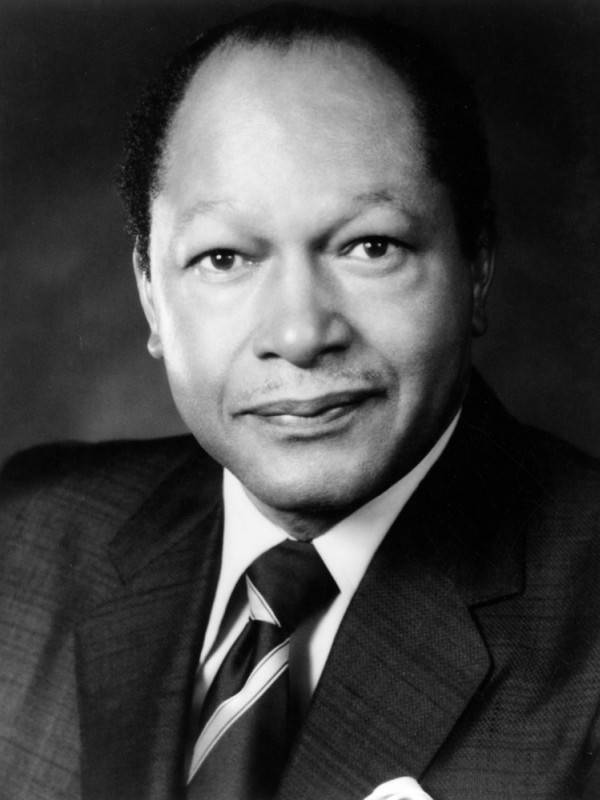
- Official portrait, 1986

38th Mayor of Los Angeles
- In office July 1, 1973 – July 1, 1993
- Preceded by: Sam Yorty
- Succeeded by: Richard Riordan

47th President of the National League of Cities
- In office 1974
- Preceded by: Roman Gribbs
- Succeeded by: Jake Garn

Member of the Los Angeles City Council from the 10th district
- In office April 2, 1963 – June 30, 1973
- Preceded by: Joe E. Hollingsworth
- Succeeded by: David S. Cunningham Jr.

Personal details
- Born: Thomas Bradley; December 29, 1917 Calvert, Texas, U.S.
- Died: September 29, 1998 (aged 80) Los Angeles, California, U.S.
- Resting place: Inglewood Park Cemetery
- Party: Democratic
- Spouse: Ethel Arnold (m. 1941)
- Children: 2
- Education: University of California, Los Angeles (BA); Southwestern Law School (JD)
- Tom Bradley's voice Tom Bradley on asking George H. W. Bush for help during the 1992 Los Angeles riots Recorded April 30, 1992
- Police career
- Department: Los Angeles Police Department
- Service years: 1940–1963

Thomas Bradley (December 29, 1917 – September 29, 1998) was an American politician, athlete, police officer, and lawyer who served as the 38th mayor of Los Angeles from 1973 to 1993. A member of the Democratic Party, he was Los Angeles' first black mayor and also its longest-serving mayor.

Bradley went to college at the University of California, Los Angeles, serving as captain of the track team. Bradley joined the Los Angeles Police Department after graduation. Disenchanted with the racism prevalent in the LAPD, Bradley became a lawyer. Bradley won election to the Los Angeles City Council, becoming its first black member in 1963. Bradley ran for mayor of Los Angeles in 1969, losing to incumbent conservative mayor Sam Yorty before defeating Yorty in 1973 and 1981.

In 1973, Bradley became the first liberal mayor of Los Angeles and its first black mayor. The Bradley coalition transformed Los Angeles from a conservative, white-dominated city to a more liberal multiracial one. Mayor Bradley appointed more women and people of color to political positions than all his predecessors combined. He was widely respected and renowned for his hard work ethic. Bradley was re-elected by landslides in 1977, 1981, and 1985. Bradley's main political opponent as mayor was Chief of the LAPD Daryl Gates, and several Bradley budgets cut funding to the LAPD. Bradley was lauded for running the first profitable Summer Olympics in 1984. The Tom Bradley International Terminal at Los Angeles International Airport is named after him and opened weeks before the 1984 Olympics. Bradley's promotion of public transit led to the creation of the Los Angeles Metro in 1990.

Bradley ran to be the first black Governor of any state since Reconstruction in 1982 and 1986 but was defeated both times by Republican candidate George Deukmejian. Bradley's narrow and unexpected 1982 loss was at odds with the polls and was attributed to the racist vote, giving rise to the political term "the Bradley effect". Bradley was considered a possible vice-presidential nominee in 1984 by Democratic presidential nominee Walter Mondale. Bradley was re-elected a final time as Los Angeles mayor in 1989, with a majority of the vote but diminished support. Bradley's approval ratings dropped after the 1992 Los Angeles riots, which led to the resignation of Bradley's longtime rival Gates. Bradley announced his retirement in 1993. A panel of 69 scholars that year ranked him the third-best mayor of any city in the United States since 1960 and among the nine best mayors in American history.

== Early life and education ==
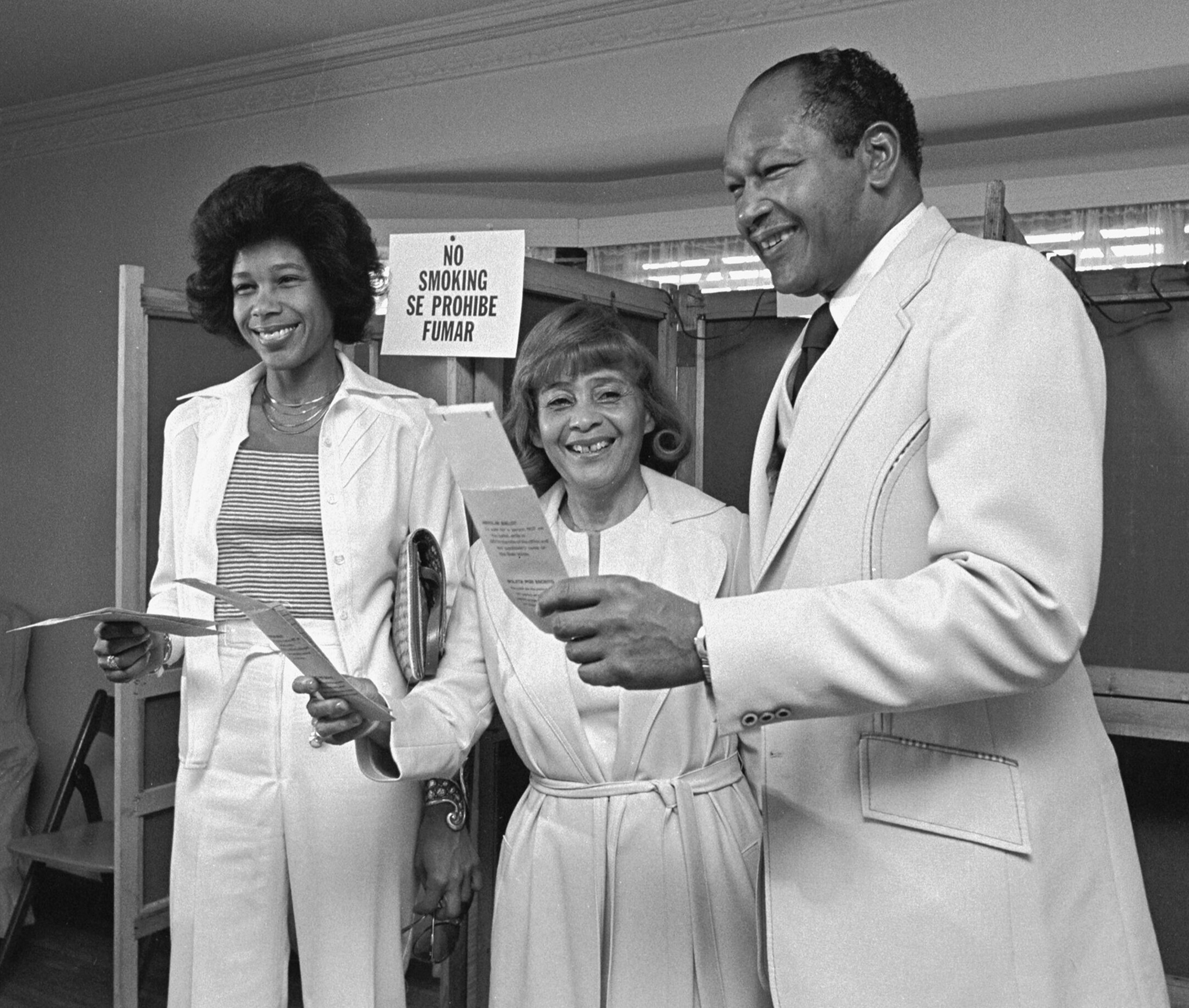
Bradley with his wife and daughter, 1977

Bradley was born on December 29, 1917, to Lee Thomas and Crenner Bradley. Thomas and Bradley were poor sharecroppers who lived in a small log cabin outside Calvert, Texas. He had four siblings — Lawrence, Willa Mae, Ellis (who had cerebral palsy) and Howard. The children's grandfather had been enslaved. The family moved to Arizona to pick cotton and then in 1924 to the Temple-Alvarado area of Los Angeles during the Great Migration, where Lee was a Santa Fe Railroad porter and Crenner was a maid.

Bradley attended Rosemont Elementary School, Lafayette Junior High School and Polytechnic High School, where he was the first black student to be elected president of the Boys League and the first to be inducted into the Ephebians national honor society. He was captain of the track team and all-city tackle for the high school football team. Bradley went to UCLA in 1937 on an athletic scholarship and joined Kappa Alpha Psi fraternity. Among the jobs he had while at college was as a photographer for comedian Jimmy Durante. At UCLA, Bradley was a standout athlete in track and field and later credited his collegiate experience with broadening his political and social outlook during a period of entrenched racial segregation in Los Angeles.

== Career ==
=== Early career ===
Bradley left his studies to join the Los Angeles Police Department in 1940. He became one of 400 black officers in a police department that had 4,000 officers. He recalled "the downtown department store that refused him credit, although he was a police officer, and the restaurants that would not serve blacks." He told a Los Angeles Times reporter:

When I came on the department, there were literally two assignments for black officers. You either worked Newton Street Division, which has a predominantly black community, or you worked traffic downtown. You could not work with a white officer, and that continued until 1964.

Bradley and Ethel Arnold met at the New Hope Baptist Church and were married May 4, 1941. They had three daughters, Lorraine, Phyllis and a baby who died on the day she was born. He and his wife "needed a white intermediary to buy their first house in Leimert Park, then a virtually all-white section of the city's Crenshaw district."

Bradley was attending Southwestern University Law School while a police officer and began his practice as a lawyer when he retired from the police department. Upon his leaving the office of mayor in 1993, he joined the law offices of Brobeck, Phleger & Harrison, specializing in international trade issues.

Tom Bradley's entry into politics came when he decided to become the president of the United Club. The club was part of the California Democratic Council, a liberal, reformist group organized in the 1950s by young Democrats energized by Adlai E. Stevenson's presidential campaigns. It was predominantly white and had many Jewish members, thus marking the beginnings of the coalition, which along with Latinos, that would carry him to electoral victory so many times. His choice of a Democratic circle also put him at odds with another political force in the African American community, representatives of poor, all-black areas who were associated with the political organization of Jesse M. Unruh, then an up-and-coming state assemblyman. The early stage of Bradley's political career was marked by clashes with African American leaders like onetime California Lieutenant Governor and former U.S. Representative Mervyn Dymally, an Unruh ally.

Bradley was a Prince Hall Freemason.

=== Los Angeles City Council ===
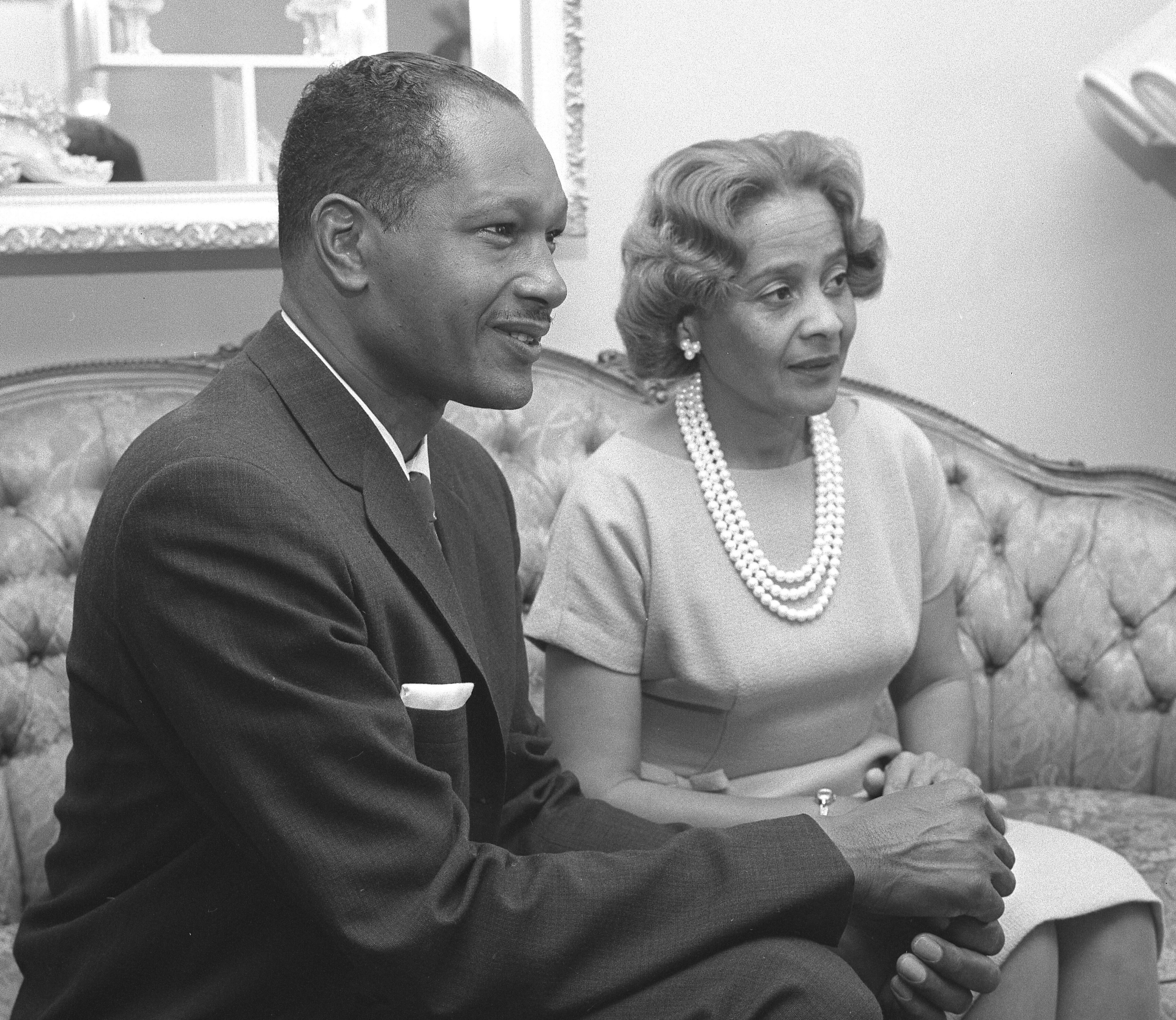
Bradley with his wife after being elected to the City Council, 1963

In June 1961, the post for 10th District was vacated by Charles Navarro when he was elected city controller. Bradley, a police lieutenant living at 3397 Welland Avenue, was one of 12 people to apply for the position. The City Council, which had the power to fill a vacancy, instead appointed Joe E. Hollingsworth. When the position was up for election again, in April 1963, Bradley ran against Hollingsworth.

There were only two candidates, Hollingsworth and Bradley, and also two elections — one for the unexpired term left by Controller Navarro, ending June 30, and one for a full four-year term starting July 1. Bradley won the first, 17,760 to 10,540 votes, and the second election, 17,552 to 10,400 votes. By then he had retired from the police force, and he was sworn in as a councilman at the age of 45 on April 15, 1963, the first African-American elected to City Council.

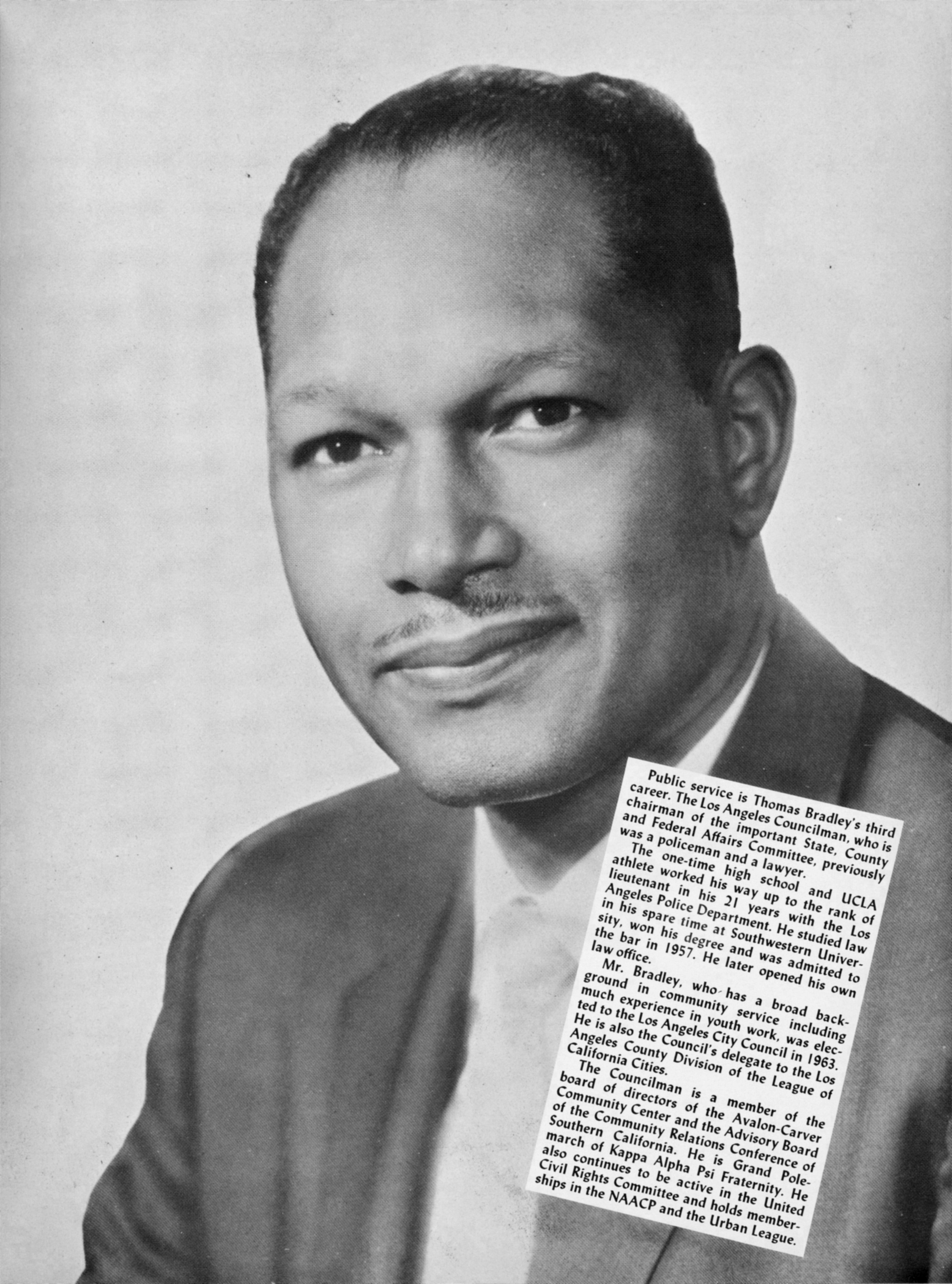
Bradley in an Elks Order publication, 1966

One of his first votes was in opposition to a proposed study by City Attorney Roger Arnebergh and Police Chief William H. Parker of the Dictionary of American Slang, ordered in an 11–4 vote by the council. Councilman Tom Shepard's motion said the book was "saturated not only with phrases of sexual filth, but wordage defamatory of minority ethnic groups and definitions insulting religions and races."

When asked why he did not participate in public demonstrations, Bradley said that he saw his position on the City Council as a way to bring groups together. He expressed a desire to establish a human relations commission for the city.

=== Campaign for Mayor of Los Angeles ===
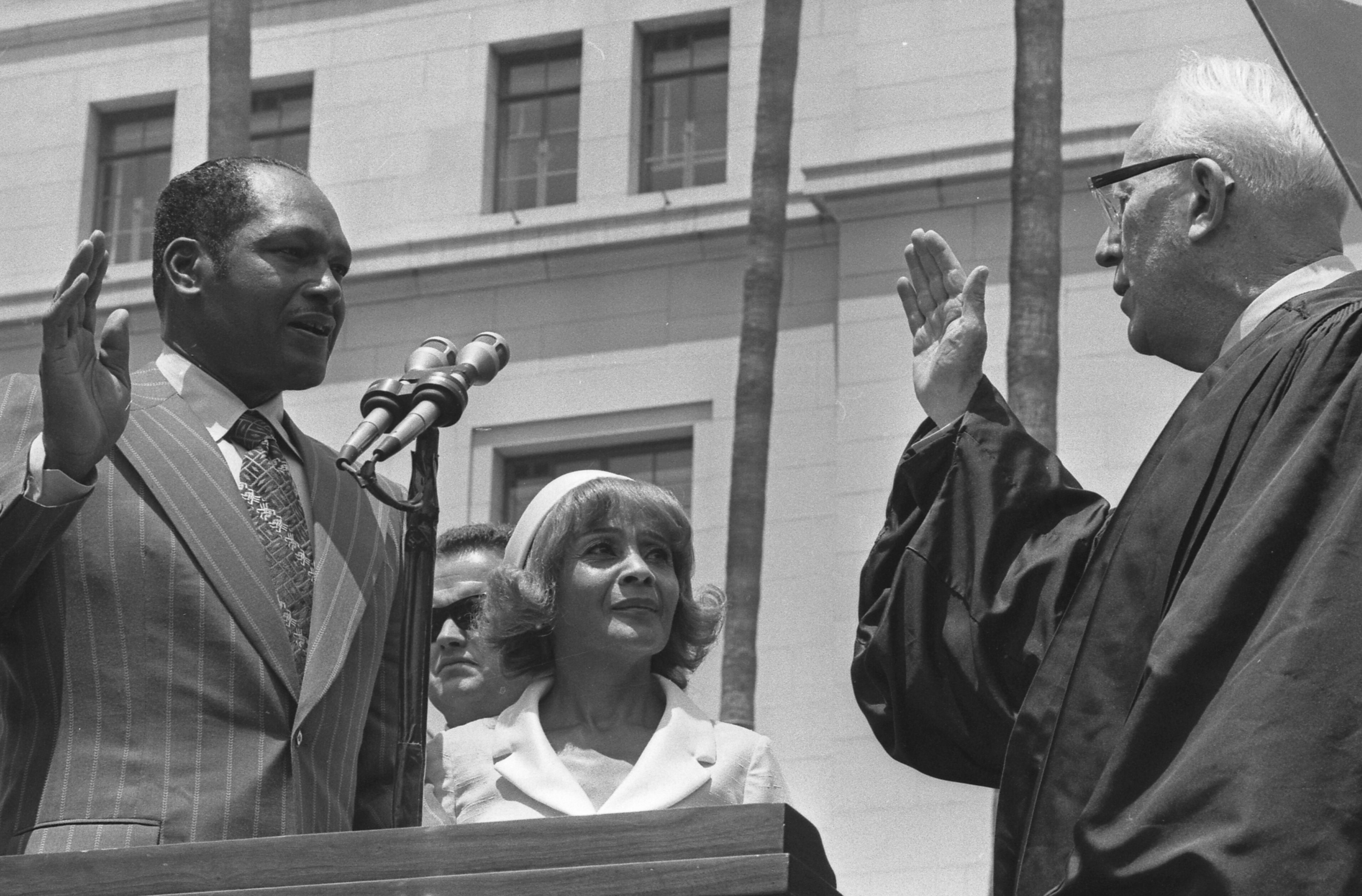
Bradley sworn in as Mayor by former Chief Justice Earl Warren, 1973

In 1969, Bradley first challenged incumbent Mayor Sam Yorty, a conservative Democrat for mayor in the nonpartisan election. Armed with key endorsements (including the Los Angeles Times), Bradley held a substantial lead over Yorty in the primary, but was a few percentage points shy of winning the race outright. However, Yorty pulled out a come-from-behind victory to win reelection. Yorty questioned Bradley's credibility in fighting crime and painted a picture of Bradley, a fellow Democrat, as a threat to Los Angeles because he would supposedly open up the city to Black Nationalists. Bradley did not use his record as a police officer in the election. With the race factor, even many liberal white voters became hesitant to support Bradley. It would be another four years, in 1973, before Bradley would unseat Yorty.

Powerful downtown business interests at first opposed Bradley. But with passage of the 1974 redevelopment plan and the inclusion of business leaders on influential committees, corporate chiefs moved in behind him. A significant feature of this plan was the development and building of numerous skyscrapers in the Bunker Hill financial district.

=== Mayor of Los Angeles ===
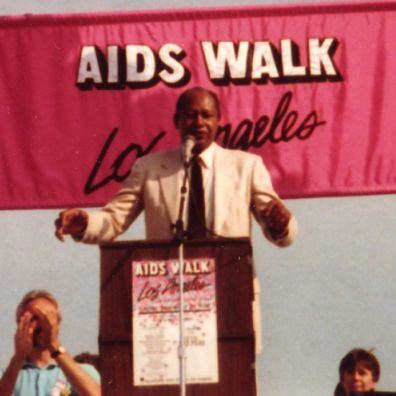
Tom Bradley speaking at AIDS Walk LA at the Paramount Studios lot in 1988

Bradley served for 20 years as mayor of Los Angeles, surpassing Fletcher Bowron with the longest tenure in that office. Bradley contributed to the financial success of the city by helping develop the satellite business hubs at Century City and Warner Center. Bradley was a strong supporter of public transit throughout his political career, and he was a driving force behind the construction of Los Angeles' light rail network. Upon his election as mayor in 1973, Bradley sought to build a comprehensive rail system in Los Angeles. He also pushed for expansion of Los Angeles International Airport and development of terminals in use today. The Tom Bradley International Terminal is named in his honor.

Bradley was offered a cabinet-level position in the administration of President Jimmy Carter, which he turned down. Bradley introduced President Carter at the May 5, 1979, dedication ceremony for the Los Angeles Placita de Dolores.

In 1984, Bradley presided over the first profitable Summer Olympics. That year Democratic presidential candidate Walter Mondale considered Bradley as a finalist for the vice presidential nomination, which eventually went to U.S. Representative Geraldine Ferraro of Queens, New York. Bradley was mayor when the city hosted the 1984 Summer Olympics and when the city became the second-most-populated U.S. city after New York, also in 1984.

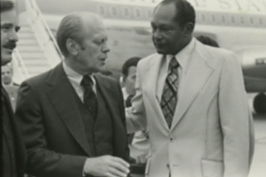
Bradley with President Gerald Ford in 1976

Although Bradley was a political liberal, he believed that business prosperity was good for the entire city and would generate jobs, an outlook like that of his successor, Richard Riordan. For most of Bradley's administration, the city appeared to agree with him. But in his fourth term, with traffic congestion, air pollution and the condition of Santa Monica Bay worsening, and with residential neighborhoods threatened by commercial development, the tide began to turn. In 1989, he was elected to a fifth term, but the ability of opponent Nate Holden to attract one-third of the vote, despite being a neophyte to the Los Angeles City Council and a very late entrant to the mayoral race, signaled that Bradley's era was drawing to a close.

Other factors in the waning of his political strength were his decision to reverse himself and support a controversial oil drilling project near the Pacific Palisades and his reluctance to condemn Louis Farrakhan, the Black Muslim minister who made speeches in Los Angeles and elsewhere that many considered anti-Semitic. Further, some key Bradley supporters lost their City Council reelection bids, among them veteran Westside Councilwoman Pat Russell. Bradley chose to leave office in 1993 rather than seek election to a sixth term.

=== Gubernatorial campaigns ===
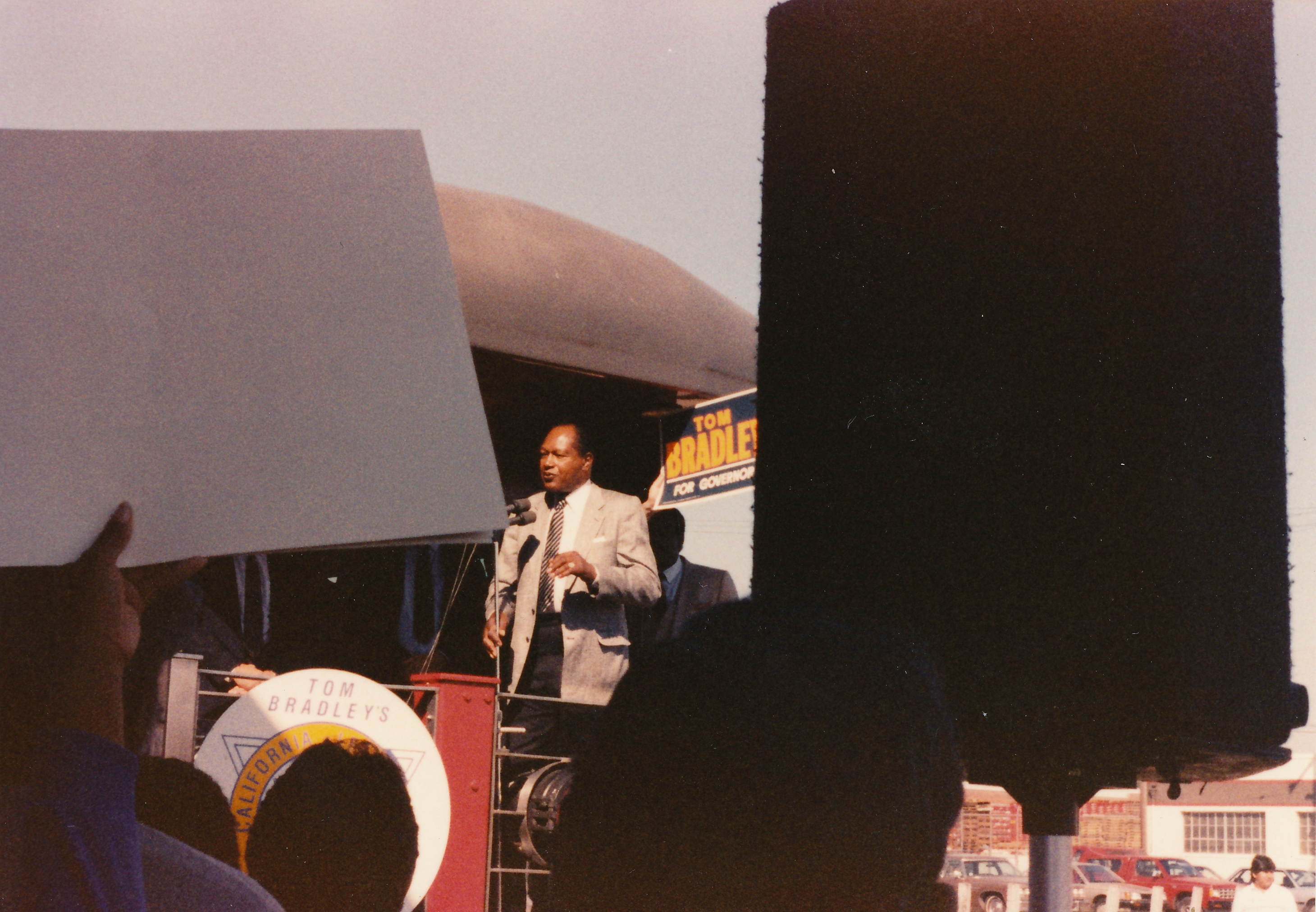
Bradley conducting a whistle stop appearance during his 1986 campaign

Bradley ran for Governor of California twice, in 1982 and 1986, but lost both times to Republican George Deukmejian. He was the first African American to head a gubernatorial ticket in California.

In 1982, the election was extremely close. Bradley led in the polls going into election day, and in the initial hours after the polls closed, some news organizations projected him as the winner. Ultimately, Bradley lost the election by 93,345 votes, about 1.2% of the 7,876,698 votes cast.

These circumstances gave rise to the term the "Bradley effect", which refers to a tendency of voters to tell interviewers or pollsters that they are undecided or likely to vote for a black candidate, but then actually vote for his white opponent. In 1986, Bradley lost the rematch to Deukmejian 61% to 37%.

== Death and legacy ==
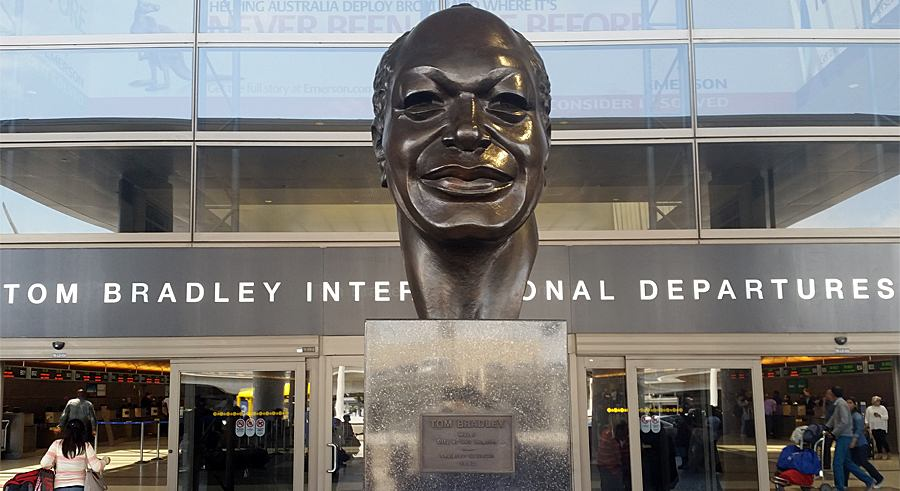
Bust at Los Angeles International Airport

Bradley had a heart attack while driving his car in March 1996 and underwent a triple bypass operation. Later, he suffered a stroke "that left him unable to speak clearly." On September 23, 1998, he was admitted to a hospital in West Los Angeles to be treated for gout. He initially seemed to be faring well, but suffered another heart attack on the morning of September 29 and was pronounced dead at 9:00 a.m., aged 80. His body lay at the Los Angeles Convention Center for public viewing. He is buried in Inglewood Park Cemetery.

Tom Bradley's political coalition originated with liberal African Americans and liberal white Americans, particularly Jewish Americans. This Bradley coalition expanded to include liberal and moderate whites, Latinos, and Asian Americans. Bradley was the first modern liberal mayor of Los Angeles, which previously was politically a conservative western town. After the Reagan Revolution led to a drop in federal funding, Bradley changed to become a more business-oriented mayor. Bradley's main political opponents were Sam Yorty and LAPD Chief Daryl Gates. Bradley cut funding to the LAPD several times but was unable to reform it.

A 1993 panel survey of 69 historians, political scientists and urban experts conducted by Melvin G. Holli of the University of Illinois at Chicago saw Bradley ranked as third-best mayor in the United States since 1960. Bradley was ranked the ninth-best American big-city mayor to serve between the years 1820 and 1993. When the survey was limited only to mayors that were in office post-1960, the results saw Bradley ranked the third-best.

Bradley plaque from 1980 in Westchester, Los Angeles

- 1976, Bradley was awarded an honorary Doctor of Laws (LL.D.) degree from Whittier College.
- 1984, Bradley was awarded the Olympic Order in silver.
- In 1985 Bradley was awarded the Spingarn Medal from the NAACP.
- The KTLA News Project: Tom Bradley, Mayor of Los Angeles a collection of the UCLA KTLA News Project at the UCLA Film & Television Archive.
- The Tom and Ethel Bradley Center at California State University, Northridge contains over one million archived images from communities of color in Los Angeles and several Latin American countries.
- Tom Bradley International Terminal at Los Angeles International Airport is named in his honor.
- Civic Center/Grand Park/Tom Bradley station on Metro Rail's B and D lines.

Bradley's mayoral archives are held at UCLA.

He also appeared in the 1995 film Nick of Time as himself.

A highly fictionalized version of him appears in James Ellroy's 2026 novel Red Sheet.

== See also ==
- History of African-Americans in Los Angeles
- African American mayors in California
- List of first African-American mayors
- Membership discrimination in California social clubs, for his signing a bill banning the practice

Political offices
Preceded by Joe E. Hollingsworth	Member of the Los Angeles City Council from the 10th district 1963–1973	Succeeded by David S. Cunningham Jr.
Preceded by Sam Yorty	Mayor of Los Angeles; 1973–1993	Succeeded by Richard Riordan
Party political offices
Preceded by Jerry Brown	Democratic nominee for Governor of California; 1982, 1986	Succeeded by Dianne Feinstein
