= Shy Tory factor =

Phenomenon observed in opinion polling

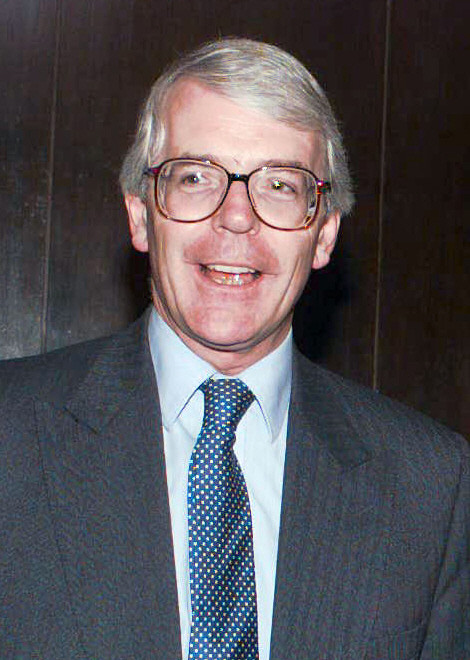
The term was coined after John Major was returned to power in 1992.

"Shy Tory factor" is a name given by British opinion polling companies to a phenomenon first observed by psephologists in the early 1990s. They observed that the share of the electoral vote won by the Conservative Party (known colloquially as the Tories) was significantly higher than the equivalent share in opinion polls. The accepted explanation was that "shy Tories" were voting Conservative after telling pollsters they would not. The general elections held in 1992 and 2015 are examples where it has allegedly affected the overall results but has further been discussed in other elections where the Conservatives did unexpectedly well. It has also been applied to the success of the Republican Party in the United States or the continued electoral victories of the People's Action Party in Singapore.

== Examples ==
=== 1992 general election ===
The final opinion polling for the 1992 United Kingdom general election gave the Conservatives between 38% and 39% of the vote, about 1% behind the Labour Party, suggesting that the election would produce a hung parliament or a narrow Labour majority and end 13 years of Tory rule. In the final results, the Conservatives received almost 42% (a lead of 7.6% over Labour) and won their fourth successive general election, although they now had a 21-seat majority compared to the 102-seat majority they had gained in the election five years previously. As a result of this failure to predict the result, the Market Research Society held an inquiry into the reasons why the polls had been so much at variance with actual public opinion. The report found that 2% of the 8.5% error could be explained by Conservative supporters refusing to disclose their voting intentions; it cited as evidence the fact that exit polls on election day also underestimated the Conservative lead. Following the 1992 election, most opinion pollsters altered their methodology to try to correct for this observed behaviour of the electorate. The methods varied for different companies. Some, including Populus, YouGov, and ICM Research, began to adopt the tactic of asking their interviewees how they had voted at the previous election and then assuming that they would vote that way again at a discounted rate. Others weighted their panel so that their past vote was exactly in line with the actual result of the election. For a time, opinion poll results were published both for unadjusted and adjusted methods. Polling companies found that telephone and personal interviews are more likely to generate a shy response than automated calling or internet polls. In the 1997 general election, the result produced a smaller gap between the parties than polls had shown, but a big majority for the Labour Party because the swing was not uniform; the polling companies that had adjusted for the "Shy Tory effect" got closer to the voting proportions than those that did not.

=== 2015 general election ===
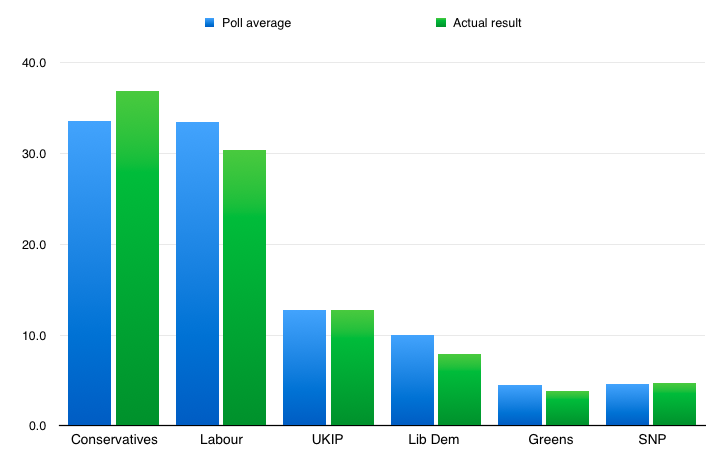
Opinion polling for the 2015 United Kingdom general election underestimated the Conservative vote.

Opinion polling for the 2015 United Kingdom general election underestimated the Conservative vote, with most polls predicting a hung parliament, and exit polls suggesting Conservatives as the largest party but not majority, whereas the actual result was a slim Conservative majority of 12 seats. Of the 92 election polls which met the standards of the British Polling Council in the six weeks before the 2015 election, none foresaw the 6.5% difference in the popular vote between the Conservative Party and Labour Party. One poll had Labour leading by 6%, two polls had Labour ahead by 4%, 7 polls had Labour ahead by 3%, 15 polls had Labour ahead by 2%, 17 polls had Labour ahead by 1%, 17 polls had a dead heat, 15 polls had the Conservatives ahead by 1%, 7 polls had the Conservatives ahead by 2%, 3 polls had the Conservatives ahead by 3%, 5 polls had the Conservatives ahead by 4%, one poll had the Conservatives ahead by 5%, and two polls had the Conservatives ahead by 6%. The two polls that gave the Conservatives a 6% lead were published two weeks before the voting, and the final polls from those polling companies, published on the eve of the voting, gave a dead heat and a 1% Labour lead. The result was eventually a Conservative Party majority with a popular vote share of 36.8% with the Labour Party achieving 30.4%. It was later widely claimed in the media that the "Shy Tory factor" had again occurred as it had done in 1992.

The British Polling Council subsequently launched an independent enquiry into how polls were so wrong amid widespread criticism that polls are no longer a trustworthy avenue of measuring voting intentions. This enquiry found that, contrary to the popular reporting, there was no "Shy Tory factor" in the election, and the polling had been incorrect for other reasons, most importantly unrepresentative samples.

== See also ==
- Blue shift (politics)
- Bradley effect
- Margin of error
- Sampling error
- Silent majority
- Social desirability bias
- Spiral of silence
- Swing voter
