= Bradley effect =

White candidate bias in voter opinion polls

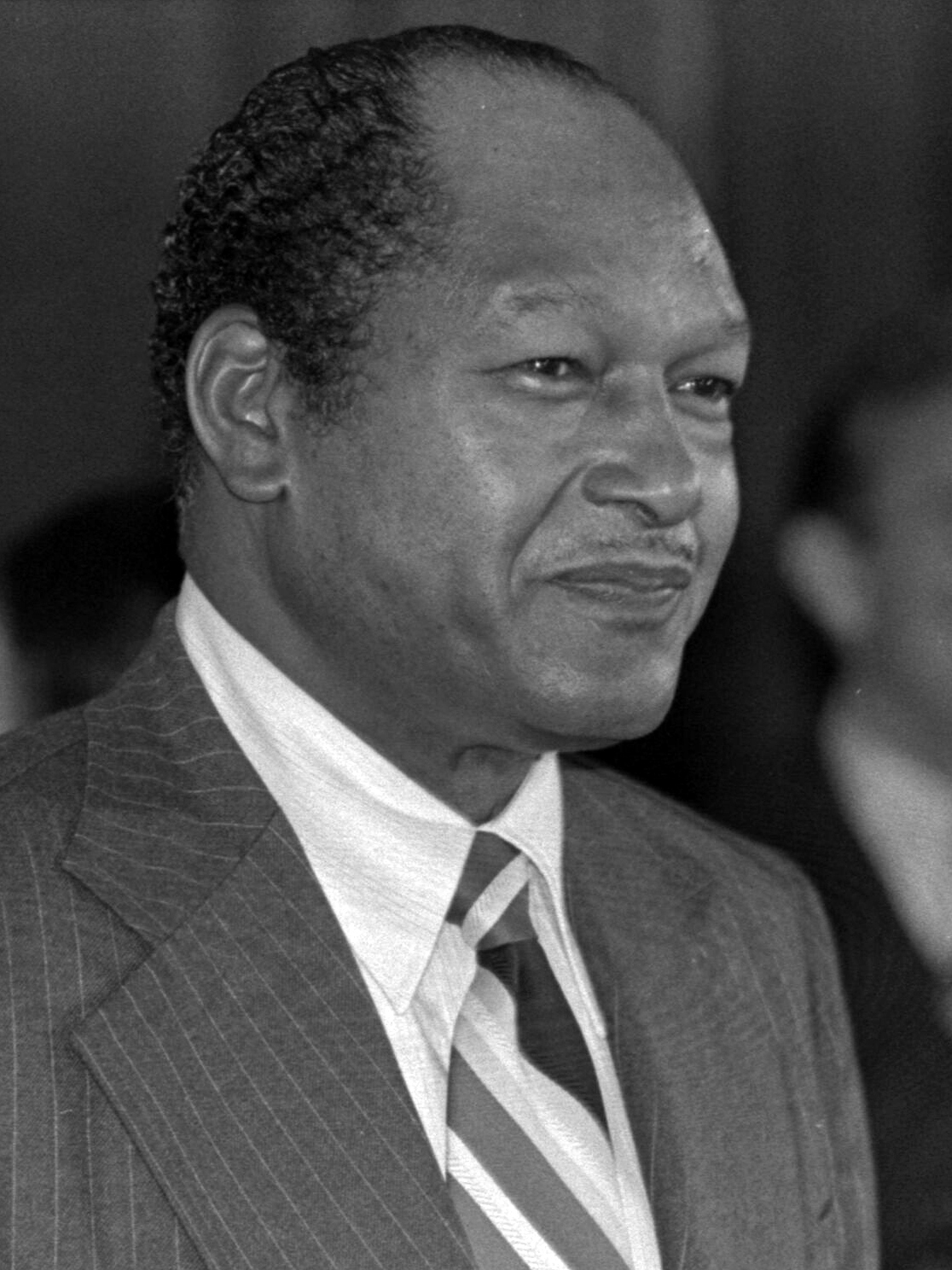
Tom Bradley

The Bradley effect, less commonly known as the Wilder effect, is a theory concerning observed discrepancies between voter-opinion polls and election outcomes in some United States government elections where a white and a non-white candidate run against each other. The theory posits that some white voters who intend to vote for the white candidate will nonetheless tell pollsters that they are undecided or likely to vote for the non-white candidate. The theory is named after Los Angeles Mayor Tom Bradley, an African-American who lost the 1982 California gubernatorial election to California attorney general George Deukmejian, an Armenian-American, despite being ahead in voter polls going into the elections.

The Bradley effect is therefore an example of social desirability bias. Specifically, some voters give inaccurate polling responses for fear that, by stating their true preference, they will open themselves to criticism of racial motivation. Members of the public may feel pressure to provide an answer that is deemed to be more publicly acceptable, or politically correct. The reluctance to give accurate polling answers has sometimes extended to post-election exit polls as well. The race of the pollster conducting the interview may factor into voters' answers.

Some analysts have dismissed the validity of the Bradley effect, calling it a convenient excuse for "major polling errors". Others have argued that it may have existed in past elections, but not in more recent ones, such as when the African-American Barack Obama was elected President of the United States in 2008 and 2012, both times against white opponents. Others believe that it is a persistent phenomenon. Similar effects have been posited in other contexts, for example the spiral of silence and the shy Tory factor.

== Origin ==
In 1982, Tom Bradley, the long-time mayor of Los Angeles, ran as the Democratic Party's candidate for Governor of California against Republican candidate George Deukmejian, who was of Armenian descent. Most polls in the final days before the election showed Bradley with a significant lead. Based on exit polls, a number of media outlets projected Bradley as the winner and early editions of the next day's San Francisco Chronicle featured a headline proclaiming "Bradley Win Projected." However, despite winning a majority of the votes cast on election day, Bradley narrowly lost the overall race once absentee ballots were included. Post-election research indicated that a smaller percentage of white voters actually voted for Bradley than polls had predicted, and that previously undecided voters had voted for Deukmejian in statistically anomalous numbers.

A month prior to the election, Bill Roberts, Deukmejian's campaign manager, predicted that white voters would break for his candidate. He told reporters that he expected Deukmejian to receive approximately 5 percent more votes than polling numbers indicated because white voters were giving inaccurate polling responses to conceal the appearance of racial prejudice. Deukmejian disavowed Roberts's comments, and Roberts resigned his post as campaign manager.

Some news outlets and columnists have attributed the theory's origin to Charles Henry, a professor of African-American Studies at the University of California, Berkeley. Henry researched the election in its aftermath, and in a 1983 study reached the controversial conclusion that race was the most likely factor in Bradley's defeat. One critic of the Bradley effect theory charged that Mervin Field of The Field Poll had already offered the theory as explanation for his poll's errors, suggesting it (without providing supporting data for the claim) on the day after the election. Ken Khachigian, a senior strategist and day-to-day tactician in Deukmejian's 1982 campaign, has noted that Field's final pre-election poll was badly timed, since it was taken over the weekend, and most late polls failed to register a surge in support for Deukmejian in the campaign's final two weeks. In addition, the exit polling failed to consider absentee balloting in an election which saw an "unprecedented wave of absentee voters" organized on Deukmejian's behalf. In short, Khachigian argues, the "Bradley effect" was simply an attempt to come up with an excuse for what was really the result of flawed opinion polling practices.

== Exit polling ==
Inaccurate polling statistics attributed to the Bradley effect are not limited to pre-election polls. In the initial hours after voting concluded in the Bradley-Deukmejian race in 1982, similarly inaccurate exit polls led some news organizations to project Bradley to have won. Republican pollster V. Lance Tarrance, Jr. argues that this was not indicative of the Bradley effect; rather the exit polls were wrong because Bradley actually won on election day turnout, but lost the absentee vote.

Exit polls in the Wilder-Coleman race in 1989 also proved inaccurate in their projection of a ten-point win for Wilder, despite those same exit polls accurately predicting other statewide races. In 2006, a ballot measure in Michigan to end affirmative action generated exit poll numbers showing the race to be too close to call. Ultimately, the measure passed by a wide margin.

== Causes ==
The causes of the polling errors are debated, but pollsters generally believe that perceived societal pressures have led some white voters to be less than forthcoming in their poll responses. These voters supposedly have harbored a concern that declaring their support for a white candidate over a non-white candidate will create a perception that the voter is racially prejudiced. During the 1988 Jackson presidential campaign, Murray Edelman, a veteran election poll analyst for news organizations and a former president of the American Association for Public Opinion Research, found the race of the pollster conducting the interview to be a factor in the discrepancy. Edelman's research showed white voters to be more likely to indicate support for Jackson when asked by a black interviewer than when asked by a white interviewer.

Andrew Kohut, who was the president of the Gallup Organization during the 1989 Dinkins/Giuliani race and later president of the Pew Research Center, which conducted research into the phenomenon, has suggested that the discrepancies may arise, not from white participants giving false answers, but rather from white voters who have negative opinions of black people being less likely to participate in polling at all than white voters who do not share such negative sentiments with regard to black people.

While there is widespread belief in a racial component as at least a partial explanation for the polling inaccuracies in the elections in question, it is not universally accepted that this is the primary factor. Peter Brodnitz, a pollster and contributor to the newsletter The Polling Report, worked on the 2006 campaign of black U.S. Senate candidate Harold Ford, Jr., and contrary to Edelman's findings in 1988, Brodnitz indicated that he did not find the race of the interviewer to be a factor in voter responses in pre-election polls. Brodnitz suggested that late-deciding voters tend to have moderate-to-conservative political opinions and that this may account in part for last-minute decision-makers breaking largely away from black candidates, who have generally been more liberal than their white opponents in the elections in question. Another prominent skeptic of the Bradley effect is Gary Langer, the director of polling for ABC News. Langer has described the Bradley effect as "a theory in search of data." He has argued that inconsistency of its appearance, particularly in more recent elections, casts doubt upon its validity as a theory.

Of all of the races presented as possible examples of the Bradley effect theory, perhaps the one most fiercely rebutted by the theory's critics is the 1982 Bradley/Deukmejian contest itself. People involved with both campaigns, as well as those involved with the inaccurate polls have refuted the significance of the Bradley effect in determining that election's outcome. Former Los Angeles Times reporter Joe Mathews said that he talked to more than a dozen people who played significant roles in either the Bradley or Deukmejian campaign and that only two felt there was a significant race-based component to the polling failures. Mark DiCamillo, Director of The Field Poll, which was among those that had shown Bradley with a strong lead, has not ruled out the possibility of a Bradley effect as a minor factor, but also said that the organization's own internal examination after that election identified other possible factors that may have contributed to their error, including a shift in voter preference after the final pre-election polls and a high-profile ballot initiative in the same election, a Republican absentee ballot program and a low minority turnout, each of which may have caused pre-election polls to inaccurately predict which respondents were likely voters.

Prominent Republican pollster V. Lance Tarrance, Jr. flatly denies that the Bradley effect occurred during that election, echoing the absentee ballot factor cited by DiCamillo. Tarrance also reports that his own firm's pre-election polls done for the Deukmejian campaign showed the race as having closed from a wide lead for Bradley one month prior to the election down to a statistical dead heat by the day of the election. While acknowledging that some news sources projected a Bradley victory based upon Field Poll exit polls which were also inaccurate, he counters that at the same time, other news sources were able to correctly predict Deukmejian's victory by using other exit polls that were more accurate. Tarrance claims that The Field Poll speculated, without supplying supporting data, in offering the Bradley effect theory as an explanation for why its polling had failed, and he attributes the emergence of the Bradley effect theory to media outlets focusing on this, while ignoring that there were other conflicting polls which had been correct all along.

Sal Russo, a consultant for Deukmejian in the race, has said that another private pollster working for the campaign, Lawrence Research, also accurately captured the late surge in favor of Deukmejian, polling as late as the night before the election. According to Russo, that firm's prediction after its final poll was an extremely narrow victory for Deukmejian. He asserts that the failure of pre-election polls such as The Field Poll arose, largely because they stopped polling too soon, and that the failure of the exit polls was due to their inability to account for absentee ballots.

Blair Levin, a staffer on the Bradley campaign in 1982 said that as he reviewed early returns at a Bradley hotel on election night, he saw that Deukmejian would probably win. In those early returns, he had taken particular note of the high number of absentee ballots, as well as a higher-than-expected turnout in California's Central Valley by conservative voters who had been mobilized to defeat the handgun ballot initiative mentioned by DiCamillo. According to Levin, even as he heard the "victory" celebration going on among Bradley supporters downstairs, those returns had led him to the conclusion that Bradley was likely to lose. John Phillips, the primary sponsor of the controversial gun control proposition, said that he felt as though he, rather than polling inaccuracies, was the primary target of the blame assigned by those present at the Bradley hotel that night. Nelson Rising, Bradley's campaign chair, spoke of having warned Bradley long before any polling concerns arose that endorsing the ballot initiative would ultimately doom his campaign. Rejecting the idea that the Bradley effect theory was a factor in the outcome, Rising said, "If there is such an effect, it shouldn't be named for Bradley, or associated with him in any way."

In 2008, several political analysts discussing the Bradley effect referred to a study authored by Daniel J. Hopkins, a post-doctoral fellow in Harvard University's Department of Government, which sought to determine whether the Bradley effect theory was valid, and whether an analogous phenomenon might be observed in races between a female candidate and a male candidate. Hopkins analyzed data from 133 elections between 1989 and 2006, compared the results of those elections to the corresponding pre-election poll numbers, and considered some of the alternate explanations which have been offered for any discrepancies therein. The study concluded finally that the Bradley effect was a real phenomenon, amounting to a median gap of 3.1 percentage points before 1996, but that it was likely not the sole factor in those discrepancies, and further that it had ceased to manifest itself at all by 1996. The study also suggested a connection between the Bradley effect and the level of racial rhetoric exhibited in the discussion of the political issues of the day. It asserted that the timing of the disappearance of the Bradley effect coincided with that of a decrease in such rhetoric in American politics over such potentially racially charged issues as crime and welfare. The study found no evidence of a corresponding effect based upon gender—in fact, female Senate candidates received on average 1.2 percentage points more votes than polls had predicted.

== History ==
=== 1983 to 1992 ===
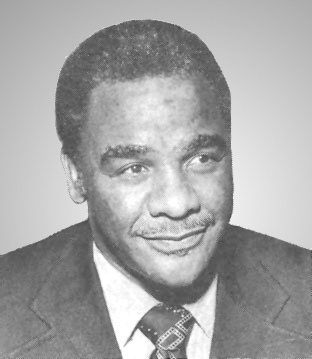
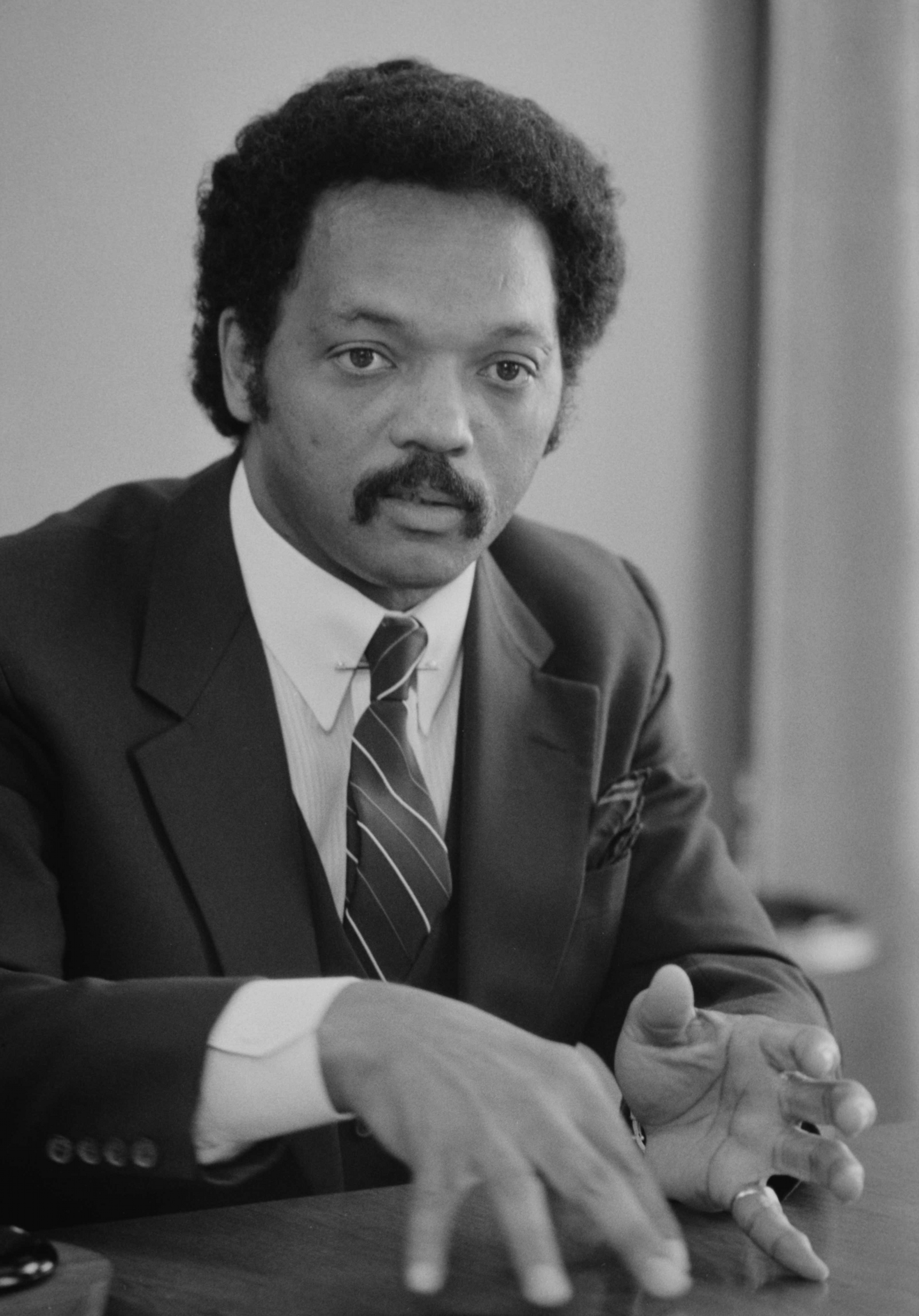
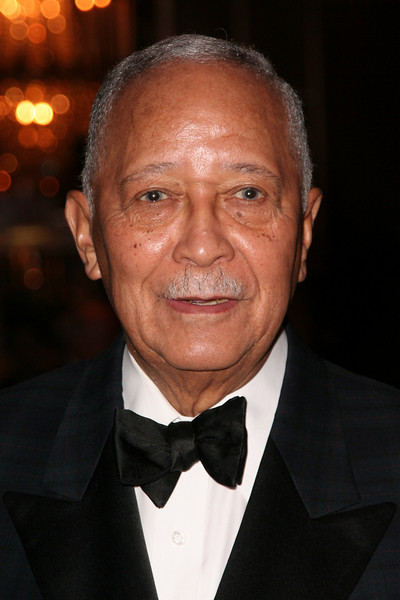
In 1980s campaigns for African-American candidates, Harold Washington (left), Jesse Jackson (center) and David Dinkins (right) each showed stronger support in the polls than they ultimately received in the voting booth.

Other elections which have been cited as possible demonstrations of the Bradley effect include the 1983 race for Mayor of Chicago, the 1988 Democratic primary race in Wisconsin for President of the United States, and the 1989 race for Mayor of New York City.

The 1983 race in Chicago featured a black candidate, Harold Washington, running against a white candidate, Bernard Epton. More so than the California governor's race the year before, the Washington-Epton matchup evinced strong and overt racial overtones throughout the campaign. Two polls conducted approximately two weeks before the election showed Washington with a 14-point lead in the race. A third conducted just three days before the election confirmed Washington continuing to hold a lead of 14 points. But in the election's final results, Washington won by less than four points.

In the 1988 Democratic presidential primary in Wisconsin, pre-election polls pegged black candidate Jesse Jackson—at the time, a legitimate challenger to white candidate and frontrunner Michael Dukakis—as likely to receive approximately one-third of the white vote. Ultimately, however, Jackson carried only about one quarter of that vote, with the discrepancy in the heavily white state contributing to a large margin of victory for Dukakis over the second-place Jackson.

In the 1989 race for Mayor of New York, a poll conducted just over a week before the election showed black candidate David Dinkins holding an 18-point lead over white candidate Rudy Giuliani. Four days before the election, a new poll showed that lead to have shrunk, but still standing at 14 points. On the day of the election, Dinkins prevailed by only two points.

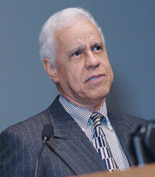
L. Douglas Wilder's margin of victory in the 1989 Virginia gubernatorial election was narrower than predicted by pre-election and exit polls.

Similar voter behavior was noted in the 1989 race for Governor of Virginia between Democrat L. Douglas Wilder, an African-American, and Republican Marshall Coleman, who was white. In that race, Wilder prevailed, but by less than half of one percent, when pre-election poll numbers showed him on average with a 9 percent lead. The discrepancy was attributed to white voters telling pollsters that they were undecided when they actually voted for Coleman.

After the 1989 Virginia gubernatorial election, the Bradley effect was sometimes called the Wilder effect. Both terms are still used; and less commonly, the term "Dinkins effect" is also used.

Also sometimes mentioned are:

- The 1987 mayoral race in Philadelphia between white former mayor Frank Rizzo and black incumbent Wilson Goode. Goode prevailed by a narrow margin, despite having had a significantly larger lead in pre-election polls.
- The 1990 Senate race in North Carolina between black candidate Harvey Gantt and white candidate Jesse Helms. Gantt lost his race by six points. Two late polls showed Gantt ahead by four to six points, but one other showed a four-point Helms victory.
- The 1991 race for Mayor of the City of Houston between Texas State Representative Sylvester Turner and Bob Lanier.
- The 1992 Senate race in Illinois between black candidate Carol Moseley Braun and white candidate Richard Williamson. Braun won her general election race by 10 points, but polls indicated a margin of up to 20 points. However, polls had been just as erroneous, though this time underestimating Braun's support, during the primary election. Braun won that contest—also against a white candidate—by three points after polls predicted she would lose by double digits.
- During the early 1990s electoral contests with former Ku Klux Klan leader and Nazi sympathizer David Duke, many potential voters would not tell pollsters that they favored Duke (as they feared the ostracization that could result from being on record as being a Duke supporter), but would go on to vote for him anyway. The commentary at that time was that Duke "flies under the radar."

=== Mid-1990s ===
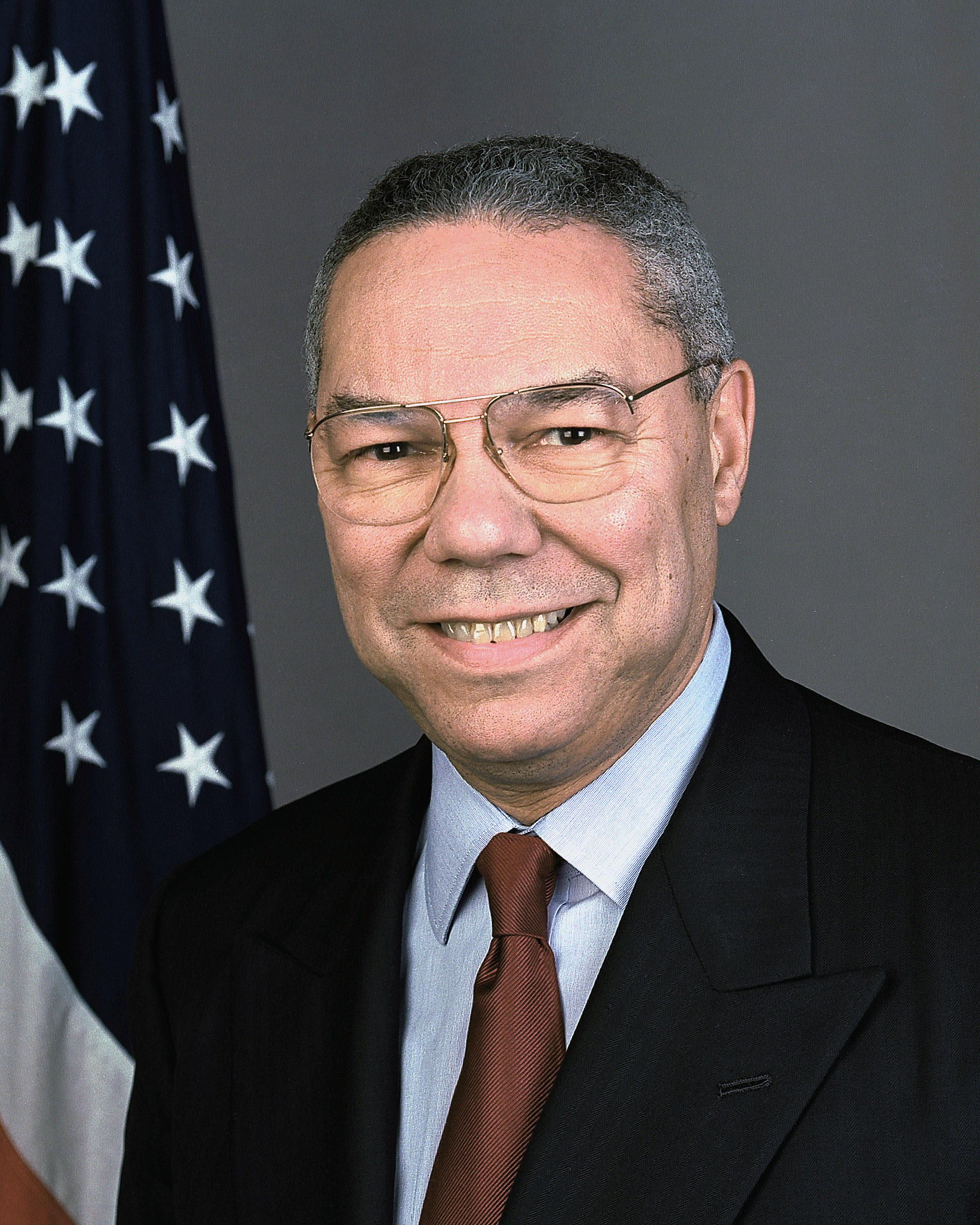
Colin Powell was reportedly warned of the Bradley effect when he was considered to be a potential 1996 presidential candidate.

In 1995, when Colin Powell's name was floated as a possible 1996 Republican presidential candidate, Powell reportedly spoke of being cautioned by publisher Earl G. Graves about the phenomenon described by the Bradley effect. With regard to opinion polls showing Powell leading a hypothetical race with then-incumbent Bill Clinton, Powell was quoted as saying, "Every time I see Earl Graves, he says, 'Look, man, don't let them hand you no crap. When [white voters] go in that booth, they ain't going to vote for you.'"

=== 2003 Louisiana gubernatorial election ===
A few analysts, such as political commentator and The Weekly Standard editor Fred Barnes, attributed the four-point loss by Indian American candidate Bobby Jindal in the 2003 Louisiana gubernatorial runoff election to the Bradley effect. In making his argument, Barnes mentioned polls that had shown Jindal with a lead. Others, such as National Review contributor Rod Dreher, countered that later polls taken just before the election correctly showed that lead to have evaporated, and reported the candidates to be statistically tied. In 2007, Jindal ran again, this time securing an easy victory, with his final vote total remaining in line with or stronger than the predictions of the polls conducted shortly before the election.

=== 2006 Senate races ===
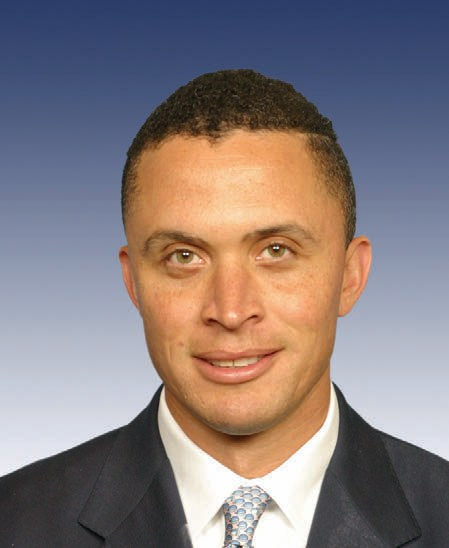
Polling numbers in Harold Ford's 2006 U.S. Senate campaign did not exhibit the Bradley effect.

In 2006, there was speculation that the Bradley effect might appear in the Tennessee race for United States Senator between Harold Ford, Jr. and white candidate Bob Corker. Ford lost by a slim margin, but an examination of exit polling data indicated that the percentage of white voters who voted for him remained close to the percentage that indicated they would do so in polls conducted prior to the election. Several other 2006 biracial contests saw pre-election polls predict their respective elections' final results with similar accuracy.

In the race for United States Senator from Maryland, black Republican candidate Michael Steele lost by a wider margin than predicted by late polls. However, those polls correctly predicted Steele's numbers, with the discrepancy in his margin of defeat resulting from their underestimating the numbers for his white Democratic opponent, then longtime Representative Ben Cardin. Those same polls also underestimated the Democratic candidate in the state's race for governor—a race in which both candidates were white.

The overall accuracy of the polling data from the 2006 elections was cited, both by those who argue that the Bradley effect has diminished in American politics, and those who doubt its existence in the first place. When asked about the issue in 2007, Douglas Wilder indicated that while he believed there was still a need for black candidates to be wary of polls, he felt that voters were displaying "more openness" in their polling responses and becoming "less resistant" to giving an accurate answer than was the case at the time of his gubernatorial election. When asked about the possibility of seeing a Bradley effect in 2008, Joe Trippi, who had been a deputy campaign manager for Tom Bradley in 1982, offered a similar assessment, saying, "The country has come a hell of a long way. I think it's a mistake to think that there'll be any kind of big surprise like there was in the Bradley campaign in 1982. But I also think it'd be a mistake to say, 'It's all gone.'"

=== 2008 United States presidential election ===
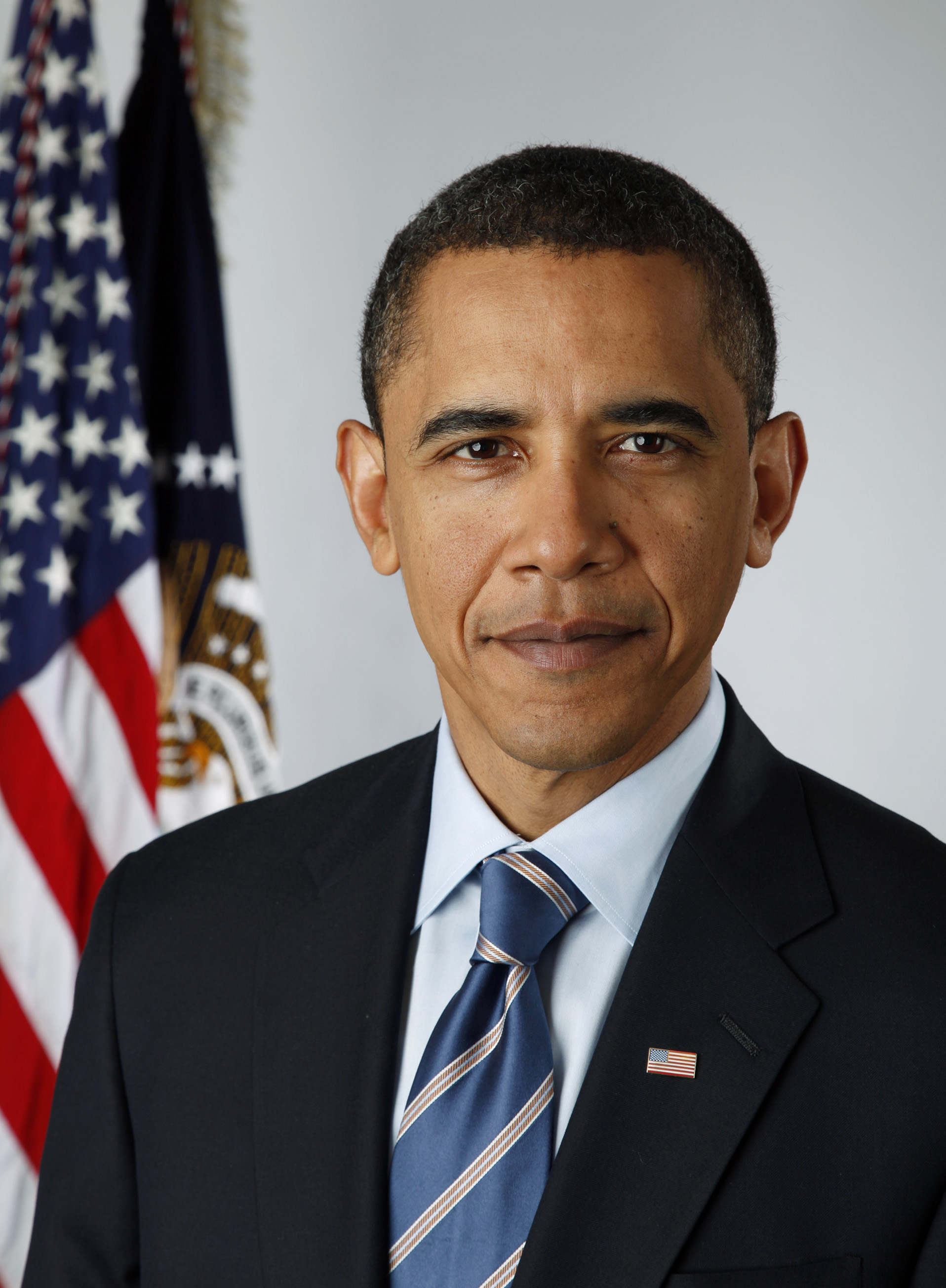
Some have suggested that President Barack Obama may have encountered both the Bradley effect, and a "reverse" Bradley effect, during the 2008 Democratic presidential primary elections.

The 2008 presidential campaign of Barack Obama, a black United States Senator, brought a heightened level of scrutiny to the Bradley effect, as observers searched for signs of the effect in comparing Obama's polling numbers to the actual election results during the Democratic primary elections. After a victorious showing in the Iowa caucuses, where votes were cast publicly, polls predicted that Obama would also capture the New Hampshire Democratic primary election by a large margin over Hillary Clinton, a white senator. However, Clinton defeated Obama by three points in the New Hampshire race, where ballots were cast secretly, immediately initiating suggestions by some analysts that the Bradley effect may have been at work. Other analysts cast doubt on that hypothesis, saying that the polls underestimated Clinton rather than overestimated Obama. Clinton may have also benefited from the primacy effect in the New Hampshire primary as she was listed ahead of Obama on every New Hampshire ballot.

After the Super Tuesday primaries of February 5, 2008, political science researchers from the University of Washington found trends suggesting the possibility that with regard to Obama, the effect's presence or absence may be dependent on the percentage of the electorate that is black. The researchers noted that to that point in the election season, opinion polls taken just prior to an election tended to overestimate Obama in states with a black population below eight percent, to track him within the polls' margins of error in states with a black population between ten and twenty percent, and to underestimate him in states with a black population exceeding twenty-five percent. The first finding suggested the possibility of the Bradley effect, while the last finding suggested the possibility of a "reverse" Bradley effect in which black voters might have been reluctant to declare to pollsters their support for Obama or are underpolled. For example, many general election polls in North Carolina and Virginia assume that black voters will be 15% to 20% of each state's electorate; they were around a quarter of each state's electorate in 2004. That high support effect has been attributed to high black voter turnout in those states' primaries, with blacks supporting Obama by margins that often exceeded 97%. With only one exception, each state that had opinion polls incorrectly predict the outcome of the Democratic contest also had polls that accurately predicted the outcome of the state's Republican contest, which featured only white candidates.

Alternatively, Douglas Wilder has suggested that a 'reverse Bradley effect' may be possible because some Republicans may not openly say they will vote for a black candidate, but may do so on election day. The "Fishtown Effect" is a scenario where prejudiced or racist white voters cast their vote for a black candidate solely on economic concerns. Fishtown, a mostly white and economically depressed neighborhood in Philadelphia, voted 81% for Obama in the 2008 election. Alternatively, writer Alisa Valdes-Rodriguez suggested another plausible factor is something called the "Huxtable effect", where the positive image of the respectable African American character Cliff Huxtable, a respected middle-class obstetrician and father on the 1980s television series The Cosby Show, made young voters who grew up with that series' initial run comfortable with the idea of an African American man being a viable presidential candidate, which enhanced Obama's election chances with that population. Others have called it the "Palmer effect" on the theory that David Palmer, a fictional president played by Dennis Haysbert during the second and third seasons of the television drama 24, showed viewers that an African American man can be a strong commander in chief.

This election was widely scrutinized as analysts tried to definitively determine whether the Bradley effect is still a significant factor in the political sphere. An inspection of the discrepancy between pre-election polls and Obama's ultimate support reveals significant bivariate support for the hypothesized "reverse Bradley effect". On average, Obama received three percentage points more support in the primaries and caucuses than he did during polling; however, he also had a strong ground campaign, and many polls do not question voters with only cell phones, who are predominantly young.

Obama went on to win the election with 53% of the popular vote and a large electoral college victory.

Following the 2008 presidential election, a number of news sources reported that the result confirmed the absence of a 'Bradley Effect' in view of the close correlation between the pre-election polls and the actual share of the popular vote.

However, it has been suggested that such assumptions based on the overall share of the vote are too simplistic because they ignore the fact that underlying factors can be contradictory and hence masked in overall voting figures. For instance, it has been suggested that an extant Bradley Effect was masked by the unusually high turnout amongst African Americans and other Democratic leaning voter groups under the unique circumstances of the 2008 election (i.e. the first serious bid for President by an African-American candidate).

=== 2016 United States presidential election ===
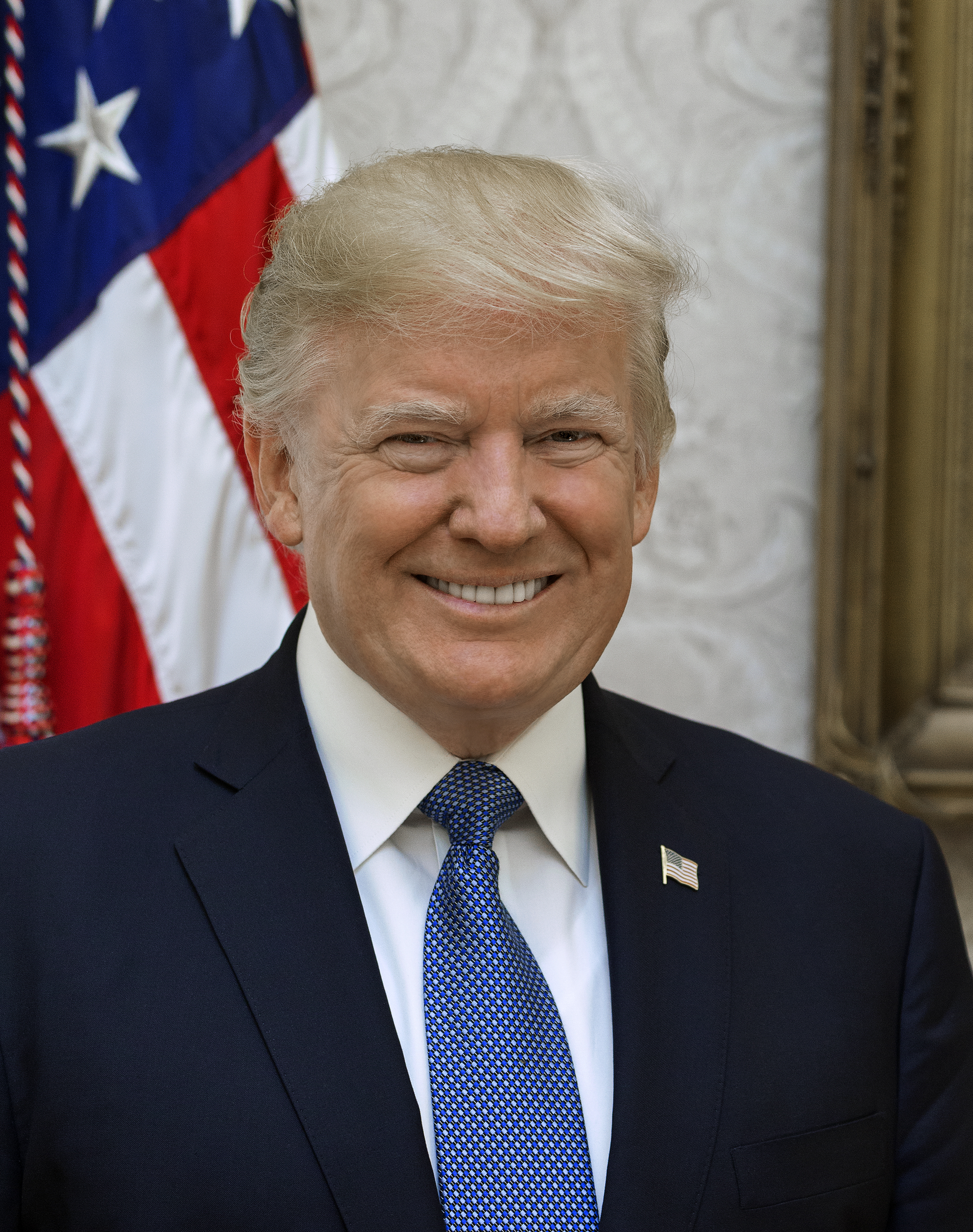
Polling for the 2016 presidential election showed Hillary Clinton winning the presidency. Clinton won the popular vote but lost the election in the Electoral College to Donald Trump.

Although both candidates in the 2016 United States presidential election were white, a similar phenomenon may have caused polls to inaccurately predict the election outcome. According to major opinion polling, former United States Senator and Secretary of State Hillary Clinton was predicted to defeat businessman Donald Trump. Nevertheless, Trump won the key Rust Belt states of Ohio, Michigan, Pennsylvania, and Wisconsin, giving him more electoral votes than Secretary Clinton. Post-election analysis of public opinion polling showed that Trump's base was larger than predicted, leading some experts to suggest that some "shy Trumpers" were hiding their preferences to avoid being seen as prejudiced by pollsters. There may have been also some cases in which male respondents were hiding their preferences to avoid being seen as sexist, as Hillary Clinton was the first female major party candidate for President.

In a 2019 press conference, Trump estimated the effect to be between 6 and 10% in his favor. He described this effect as "I don’t know if I consider that to be a compliment, but in one way it is a compliment."

However many pollsters have disputed this claim. A 2016 poll conducted by Morning Consult showed that Trump performed better in general election polls regardless of whether the poll was conducted online or by live interviewer over the phone. This finding led Morning Consult's chief research officer to conclude that there was little evidence that poll respondents were feeling pressured to downplay their true general election preferences. Harry Enten, an analyst for FiveThirtyEight.com noted that Trump generally underperformed his polling in Democratic-leaning states like California and New York — where the stigma against voting for Trump likely would have been stronger — and overperformed his polls in places like Wisconsin and Ohio. Enten concluded that, although Trump did better than the polls predicted in many states, he "didn’t do so in a pattern consistent with a 'shy Trump' effect".

=== 2018 midterms ===
The Bradley effect—as well a variant of the so-called shy Tory factor that involves prospective voters' expressed intentions to vote for candidates belonging to the U.S. Republican Party—reportedly skewed a number of opinion polls running up to the 2018 U.S. elections. Notably, the effect was arguably present in the Florida gubernatorial election between black Democrat Andrew Gillum, the mayor of Tallahassee, and white Republican Ron DeSantis, a U.S. Congressman. Despite Gillum having led in most polls before the election, DeSantis ultimately won by a margin of 0.4%.

== See also ==
- Ethnocultural politics in the United States
- Racism in the United States
- Silent majority
- Covert racism
