= 1982 California gubernatorial election =

- November 2, 1982
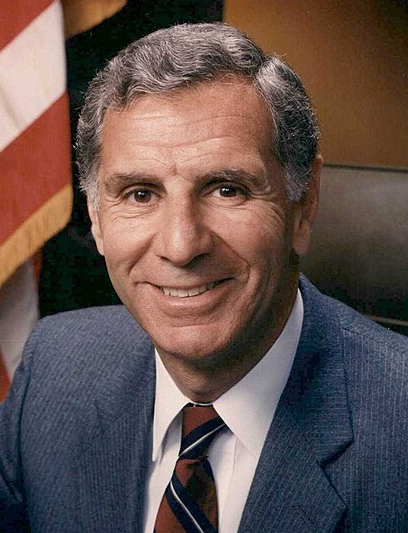

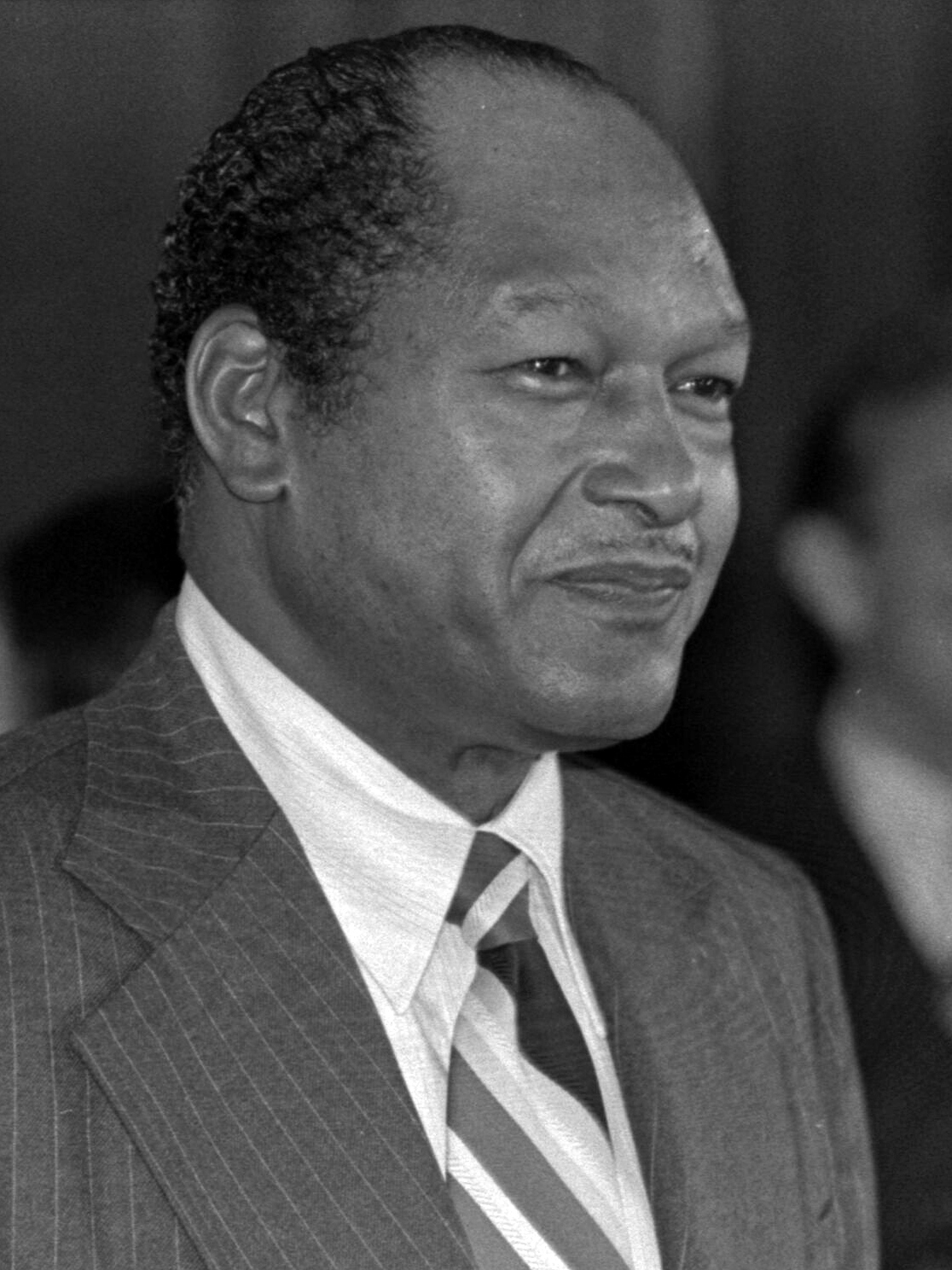
Nominee	George Deukmejian	Tom Bradley
Party	Republican	Democratic
Popular vote	3,881,014	3,787,669
Percentage	49.28%	48.09%
- County results Deukmejian: 40–50% 50–60% 60–70% Bradley: 40–50% 50–60% 60–70%
Governor before election
Jerry Brown
Democratic
Elected Governor
George Deukmejian
Republican

The 1982 California gubernatorial election occurred on November 2, 1982. The Republican nominee, Attorney General George Deukmejian, narrowly defeated the Democratic nominee, Los Angeles Mayor Tom Bradley. Incumbent Governor Jerry Brown did not seek reelection to a third consecutive term; he later successfully ran again in 2010 and 2014.

This election was notable for Deukmejian's upset victory against Bradley, who had led the polls during the campaign. The incorrect polling therefore led to the theory called the "Bradley effect".

== Primary election ==
In the Democratic primary, Los Angeles Mayor Tom Bradley easily defeated State Senator John Garamendi and Mario G. Obledo. On the Republican side, it was a two-man race between Lieutenant Governor Mike Curb and Attorney General George Deukmejian. Deukmejian won the primary with nearly 55% of the vote.

=== Republican Party ===
Republican primary results
Party	Candidate	Votes	%
Republican	George Deukmejian	1,165,266	51.08%
Republican	Mike Curb	1,020,935	44.76%
Republican	William H. R. Clark	44,998	1.97%
Republican	Michael Arthur Hirt	25,613	1.12%
Republican	James C. Mansfield	24,303	1.07%
Total votes		2,281,115	100.00%

=== Democratic Party ===
Democratic primary results
Party	Candidate	Votes	%
Democratic	Tom Bradley	1,726,985	61.08%
Democratic	John Garamendi	712,161	25.19%
Democratic	Mario G. Obledo	132,402	4.68%
Democratic	Frank L. Thomas	51,158	1.81%
Democratic	Linda Irene Parnell	45,607	1.61%
Democratic	Hugh G. Bagley	40,335	1.43%
Democratic	John Hancock Abbott	26,989	0.95%
Democratic	Ben Trevino	19,220	0.68%
Democratic	Genevieve Grafe Marcus	16,124	0.57%
Democratic	Raymond V. Liebenberg	15,267	0.54%
Democratic	Jules Kimmett	15,182	0.54%
Democratic	Josephum S. Ramos	12,948	0.46%
Democratic	Allen Lee Seaman	12,942	0.46%
Democratic	William A. Brown (write-in)	28	0.00%
Total votes		2,827,348	100.00%

=== American Independent Party ===
American Independent primary results
Party	Candidate	Votes	%
American Independent	James C. Griffin	16,818	100.00%
Total votes		16,818	100.00%

=== Libertarian Party ===
American Independent primary results
Party	Candidate	Votes	%
Libertarian	Dan P. Dougherty	13,565	100.00%
Total votes		13,565	100.00%

=== Peace and Freedom Party ===
Peace and Freedom primary results
Party	Candidate	Votes	%
Peace and Freedom	Elizabeth Martinez	4,353	55.07%
Peace and Freedom	Jan B. Tucker	3,552	44.93%
Total votes		7,905	100.00%

== General election ==
Early indications were that it would be a close race but as the campaign went on, Bradley slowly increased his lead in the polls. Despite this, the outcome was still in doubt as election night wore on. A large late surge of absentee ballots (many from conservative Orange County and Deukmejian's home area of Long Beach) helped tip the balance in his favor. The incorrect polling numbers led to the theory — later dubbed "the Bradley effect" — that a statistically significant number of voters had given inaccurate responses when questioned by pollsters.

1982 California gubernatorial election
Party	Candidate	Votes	%	±%
Republican	George Deukmejian	3,881,014	49.27%	+12.77%
Democratic	Tom Bradley	3,787,669	48.09%	−7.95%
Libertarian	Dan P. Dougherty	81,076	1.03%	−4.43%
Peace and Freedom	Elizabeth Martinez	70,327	0.89%	−0.13%
American Independent	Jim Griffin	56,249	0.71%	−0.26%
	Scattering	363	0.00%	
Majority		93,345	1.19%	
Total votes		7,876,698	100.00%	
Republican gain from Democratic		Swing	+20.72%	

=== Results by county ===
County	George Deukmejian Republican		Tom Bradley Democratic		Dan P. Dougherty Libertarian		Elizabeth Martinez Peace & Freedom		Jim Griffin American Independent		Margin		Total votes cast (Note: County totals do not include the write-in votes, which are only given as statewide totals in the Statement Of Vote)
County	#	%	#	%	#	%	#	%	#	%	#	%	Total votes cast
Alameda	145,964	37.62%	225,578	58.91%	4,477	1.15%	5,845	1.51%	3,158	0.81%	-82,614	-21.29%	388,022
Alpine	218	52.66%	185	44.69%	1	0.24%	3	0.72%	7	1.69%	33	7.97%	414
Amador	6,251	61.19%	3,643	35.66%	88	0.86%	87	0.85%	146	1.43%	2,608	25.53%	10,215
Butte	36,074	58.13%	23,734	38.25%	793	1.28%	813	1.31%	639	1.03%	12,340	19.89%	62,053
Calaveras	6,277	61.63%	3,501	34.37%	157	1.54%	126	1.24%	124	1.22%	2,776	27.26%	10,185
Colusa	3,036	62.95%	1,621	33.61%	53	1.10%	68	1.41%	45	0.93%	1,415	29.34%	4,823
Contra Costa	126,460	49.83%	119,712	47.17%	3,167	1.25%	2,249	0.89%	2,200	0.87%	6,748	2.66%	253,788
Del Norte	3,355	51.32%	2,934	44.88%	72	1.10%	107	1.64%	70	1.07%	421	6.44%	6,538
El Dorado	20,591	59.37%	12,999	37.48%	423	1.22%	284	0.82%	383	1.10%	7,592	21.89%	34,680
Fresno	80,171	52.59%	68,623	45.01%	1,468	0.96%	1,213	0.80%	978	0.64%	11,548	7.57%	152,453
Glenn	5,492	67.49%	2,398	29.47%	79	0.97%	43	0.53%	126	1.55%	3,094	38.02%	8,138
Humboldt	21,609	45.38%	23,991	50.38%	622	1.31%	748	1.57%	653	1.37%	-2,382	-5.00%	47,623
Imperial	10,272	51.40%	9,133	45.70%	140	0.70%	204	1.02%	237	1.19%	1,139	5.70%	19,986
Inyo	5,008	63.87%	2.599	33.15%	88	1.12%	65	0.83%	81	1.03%	2,409	30.72%	7,841
Kern	70,095	55.30%	53,799	42.44%	935	0.74%	859	0.68%	1,065	0.84%	16,296	12.86%	126,753
Kings	9,938	54.64%	7,718	42.43%	140	0.77%	176	0.97%	217	1.19%	2,220	12.21%	18,189
Lake	8,867	53.24%	7,143	42.89%	233	1.40%	184	1.10%	227	1.36%	1,724	10.35%	16,654
Lassen	4,472	56.64%	3,003	38.03%	133	1.68%	72	0.91%	216	2.74%	1,469	18.60%	7,896
Los Angeles	1,024,946	45.67%	1,173,149	52.27%	16,794	0.75%	18,163	0.81%	11,184	0.50%	-148,203	-6.60%	2,244,236
Madera	10,334	54.57%	7,889	41.66%	312	1.65%	152	0.80%	250	1.32%	2,445	12.91%	18,937
Marin	42,260	42.83%	52,534	53.24%	2,371	2.40%	1,066	1.08%	437	0.44%	-10,274	-10.41%	98,668
Mariposa	3,255	56.39%	2,324	40.26%	64	1.11%	60	1.04%	69	1.20%	931	16.13%	5,772
Mendocino	12.398	46.82%	12,786	48.29%	422	1.59%	519	1.96%	353	1.33%	-388	-1.47%	26,478
Merced	17,477	52.62%	14,649	44.10%	467	1.41%	261	0.79%	362	1.09%	2,828	8.51%	33,216
Modoc	2,599	68.83%	995	26.35%	64	1.69%	34	0.90%	84	2.22%	1,604	42.48%	3,776
Mono	1,977	59.58%	1,249	37.64%	26	0.78%	34	1.02%	32	0.96%	728	21.94%	3,318
Monterey	37,493	47.78%	38,301	48.81%	958	1.22%	1,067	1.36%	656	0.84%	-808	-1.03%	78,475
Napa	21,812	54.20%	17,042	42.34%	494	1.23%	454	1.13%	445	1.11%	4,770	11.85%	40,247
Nevada	14,753	56.80%	10,262	39.51%	499	1.92%	234	0.90%	226	0.87%	4,491	17.29%	25,974
Orange	422,878	61.44%	252,572	36.70%	5,965	0.87%	3,346	0.49%	3,537	0.51%	170,306	24.74%	688,298
Placer	28,082	55.47%	20,832	41.15%	737	1.46%	425	0.84%	548	1.08%	7,250	14.32%	50,624
Plumas	4,237	53.53%	3,355	42.39%	161	2.03%	61	0.77%	101	1.28%	882	11.14%	7,915
Riverside	119,680	53.27%	100,370	44.68%	1,524	0.68%	1,538	0.68%	1,535	0.68%	19,310	8.60%	224,647
Sacramento	171,176	52.35%	146,167	44.70%	4,114	1.26%	2,820	0.86%	2,705	0.83%	25,009	7.65%	326,982
San Benito	3,608	46.67%	3,782	48.92%	167	2.16%	75	0.97%	99	1.28%	-174	-2.25%	7,731
San Bernardino	144,096	53.29%	119,185	44.08%	2,393	0.88%	1,997	0.74%	2,727	1.01%	24,911	9.21%	270,398
San Diego	330,037	52.76%	279,113	44.62%	6,642	1.06%	5,043	0.81%	4,681	0.75%	50,924	8.14%	625,516
San Francisco	69,478	30.43%	151,769	66.47%	2,829	1.24%	3,218	1.41%	1,040	0.46%	-82,291	-36.04%	228,334
San Joaquin	65,583	60.06%	40,002	36.63%	1,348	1.23%	994	0.91%	1.265	1.16%	25,581	23.43%	109,192
San Luis Obispo	33,457	52.94%	28,417	44.96%	556	0.88%	383	0.61%	388	0.61%	5,040	7.97%	63,201
San Mateo	99,527	46.36%	108,374	50.48%	2,977	1.39%	1,948	0.91%	1,843	0.86%	-8,847	-4.12%	214,669
Santa Barbara	55,682	48.33%	57,164	49.62%	988	0.86%	801	0.70%	568	0.49%	-1,482	-1.29%	115,203
Santa Clara	180,232	43.96%	216,781	52.87%	5,983	1.46%	3,858	0.94%	3,163	0.77%	-36,549	-8.91%	410,017
Santa Cruz	29,545	38.09%	44,282	57.09%	1,221	1.57%	1,940	2.50%	577	0.74%	-14,737	-19.00%	77,565
Shasta	26,902	57.61%	18,053	38.66%	707	1.51%	394	0.84%	642	1.37%	8,849	18.95%	46,698
Sierra	914	48.33%	907	47.96%	24	1.27%	20	1.06%	26	1.37%	7	0.37%	1,891
Siskiyou	9,457	58.40%	6,009	37.11%	259	1.60%	188	1.16%	281	1.74%	3,448	21.29%	16,194
Solano	36,968	50.31%	33,997	46.26%	979	1.33%	706	0.96%	837	1.14%	2,971	4.04%	73,487
Sonoma	55,968	45.10%	63,542	51.20%	1,735	1.40%	1,747	1.41%	1,115	0.90%	-7,574	-6.10%	124,107
Stanislaus	43,639	55.94%	32,276	41.38%	687	0.88%	648	0.83%	758	0.97%	11,363	14.57%	78,008
Sutter	10,753	63.33%	5,660	33.33%	184	1.08%	235	1.38%	148	0.87%	5,093	29.99%	16,980
Tehama	9,628	58.55%	6,134	37.30%	250	1.52%	145	0.88%	288	1.75%	3,494	21.25%	16,445
Trinity	3,100	53.95%	2,351	40.92%	112	1.95%	66	1.15%	117	2.04%	749	13.04%	5,746
Tulare	38,901	56.69%	28,330	41.29%	415	0.60%	501	0.73%	470	0.68%	10,571	15.41%	68,617
Tuolumne	8,716	56.84%	6,107	39.82%	160	1.04%	148	0.97%	204	1.33%	2,609	17.01%	15,335
Ventura	99,130	55.22%	76,094	42.39%	1,782	0.99%	1,290	0.72%	1,228	0.68%	23,036	12.83%	179,524
Yolo	19,227	42.99%	24,150	54.00%	485	1.08%	445	1.00%	415	0.93%	-4,923	-11.01%	44,722
Yuba	6,959	53.77%	5,400	41.73%	152	1.17%	157	1.21%	273	2.11%	1,559	12.05%	12,941
Total	3,881,014	49.27%	3,787,669	48.09%	81,076	1.03%	70,327	0.89%	56,249	0.71%	93,345	1.19%	7,876,698

==== Counties that flipped from Democratic to Republican ====
- Alpine
- Amador
- Butte
- Calaveras
- Contra Costa
- El Dorado
- Fresno
- Kern
- Kings
- Lake
- Lassen
- Madera
- Marin
- Mariposa
- Merced
- Napa
- Nevada
- Orange
- Placer
- Plumas
- Riverside
- Sacramento
- San Bernardino
- San Diego
- San Joaquin
- San Luis Obispo
- Shasta
- Sierra
- Siskiyou
- Solano
- Stanislaus
- Tehama
- Trinity
- Tuolumne
- Ventura
- Yuba
