= Murray Edelman =

American political scientist

Murray Jacob Edelman (1919 – January 26, 2001) was an American political scientist known for his research on symbolic politics and political psychology.

== Career ==
Edelman received a bachelor's degree in social sciences from Bucknell University in 1941, a master's degree from the University of Chicago in 1942 and a Ph.D. in political science from the University of Illinois in 1948. He joined the faculty of the University of Illinois that year, and remained there until he joined the faculty of the University of Wisconsin - Madison in 1966. Edelman was awarded a University Houses chair in 1971, which he named for George Herbert Mead, an inspiration for much of his own work on symbolic politics. Edelman retired in 1990.

Edelman received many awards during his career, including Fulbright Awards and fellowships from the John Simon Guggenheim Memorial Foundation and the National Endowment for the Humanities.

A brief review of his seminal book, The Symbolic Uses of Politics appearing in ETC., the quarterly journal of General Semantics (Arthur A. Berger, September 1971 issue—Vol 28, No. 3) noted that Edelman's approach and analysis would be congenial to students of General Semantics.

== Books ==
- The Symbolic Uses of Politics (hardcover publication originally 1964; later paperback reprints) ISBN 0-252-01202-X
- Politics as Symbolic Action: Mass Arousal and Quiescence (1971) ISBN 0-8410-0302-5
- Political Language: Words that succeed and policies that fail (1977)
- Constructing the Political Spectacle (1988) ISBN 0-226-18399-8
- From Art to Politics: How Artistic Creations Shape Political Conceptions (1996) ISBN 0-226-18401-3
- The Politics of Misinformation (2001) ISBN 0-521-80510-4
