= Mario G. Obledo =

41st President of the LULAC
- In office 1983–1985
- Preceded by: Tony Bonilla
- Succeeded by: Oscar Moran

Personal details
- Born: April 9, 1932 San Antonio, Texas
- Died: August 18, 2010 (aged 78) Sacramento, California
- Spouse: Keda Alcalá-Obledo
- Occupation: Attorney, civil rights activist, California Secretary of Health and Welfare

Mario Guerra Obledo (April 9, 1932 – August 18, 2010) was an American civil rights leader. He was called the "Godfather of the Latino Movement" in the United States, credited with establishing numerous civic institutions and bringing Latino interests into the center of the U.S. political arena. He also served as California's Secretary of Health and Welfare from 1975 to 1982.

== Background ==
Obledo was born in San Antonio, Texas. His parents were Mexican immigrants and he was one of 12 children. He earned a pharmacy degree from the University of Texas at Austin in 1957 and a law degree from St. Mary's University in San Antonio in 1960. For three years he was a Texas assistant attorney general.

In 1967, Obledo was a co-founder of the Mexican American Legal Defense and Education Fund (MALDEF), and was the organization's first general counsel. In 1970, facing pressure from the Ford Foundation, MALDEF's most important funding source, due to the organization's perceived "militant" positions, MALDEF moved its headquarters from San Antonio to San Francisco, California, and Obledo replaced Pete Tijerina as executive director. Obledo served in that position until 1973, pursuing a strategy of involving MALDEF in employment and language rights litigation and conceiving the organization's role as a "law firm for the Latino community."

After MALDEF, Obledo taught at Harvard Law School, where he was working in 1974 when California's newly elected governor Jerry Brown asked him for assistance in recruiting potential cabinet officers. Brown then offered Obledo the position of health and welfare secretary, making him at that time California's highest ranking Mexican American official. Obledo served in that position from 1975 until 1982, when he resigned to make an unsuccessful run for the Democratic nomination for governor.

Obledo was also a co-founder of the Hispanic National Bar Association and the National Coalition of Hispanic Organizations, and an early leader of the Southwest Voter Registration Education Project. He was president of the League of United Latin American Citizens (LULAC) in the mid-1980s, and chairman of the National Rainbow Coalition from 1988 to 1993.

After an extended period outside the public spotlight, Obledo re-emerged as a public activist in the late 1990s, and was noted, among other activities, for protesting against anti-immigrant advertising, and promoting a boycott of the Taco Bell chihuahua for its stereotypical Mexican accent.

President Bill Clinton presented Obledo with the Presidential Medal of Freedom in 1998, describing him as having "created a powerful chorus for justice and equality." In May 2010, Obledo received an honorary doctor of laws degree from California State University, Sacramento. Obledo died on August 18, 2010, in Sacramento, California, following a heart attack, at the age of 78.
