= 10K =

10K may refer to:

- 10000 (number), the natural number following 9999 and preceding 10001
- 10K run, a common road running race distance
- 10,000 metres, a running track race distance
- 10-K Thirst Quencher, a sports drink
- Form 10-K, a form used by the Securities and Exchange Commission
- 10K, la década robada, Argentine book by Jorge Lanata
- 10K Plan, a plan by Jerry Brown to attract 10,000 new residents to Oakland, California
- 10K, character in Z Nation
- 10K resolution a digital video format having a horizontal resolution of approximately 10,000 pixels
- 10K Projects, an American record label

== See also ==
- 10000 (disambiguation)
- K10 (disambiguation)
- K (disambiguation)
