= K10 =

K10 may refer to:

== Aircraft ==
- Kalinin K-10, a Soviet trainer
- Kawanishi K-10 Transport, a Japanese biplane
- Schleicher K 10, a German glider
- Skyeton K-10 Swift, a Ukrainian light-sport aircraft

== Automobiles ==
- K10 ARV, a South Korean ammunition resupply vehicle
- Kandi K10, a Chinese city car
- Maruti Alto K10, a Japanese city car
- Nissan Micra (K10), a Japanese hatchback

== Ships ==
- Brazilian ship Gastão Moutinho (K10), a Penguin-class submarine rescue ship of the Brazilian Navy
- HMS K10, a K-class submarine of the Royal Navy
- HMS Snapdragon (K10), a Flower-class corvette of the Royal Navy
- HMSAS Natal (K10), a Loch-class frigate of the South African Navy

== Other ==
- K-10 (Kansas highway)
- K-10 robot, a rover used to explore planetary surfaces
- K10 transport/localisation element (TLS), a cis-regulatory RNA element
- AMD K10, an AMD x86 CPU architecture
- K-10S, a Soviet supersonic anti-ship missile
- Keratin 10, a human protein
- LG K10, a smartphone
- LSWR K10 class, a British steam locomotive
- Sonata in B flat, K. 10, by Wolfgang Amadeus Mozart
