= K12 =

K–12 commonly refers to primary and secondary education in the United States and Canada.

K12 may also refer to:

== Arts and entertainment ==
- K–12 (album), by Melanie Martinez
  - K–12 (film), the accompanying film
- Sonata in A, K. 12, by Wolfgang Amadeus Mozart
- A fictional ski slope in the film Better Off Dead

== Science and mathematics ==
- E. coli K-12, a bacterial strain
- Keratin 12, a protein
- Coxeter–Todd lattice K_{12}, a 12-dimensional lattice

== Technology ==
- 21 cm K 12 (E) German World War II railway gun
- AMD K12, a CPU microarchitecture
- Curtiss K-12, an aircraft engine
- S&T Motiv K12, a South Korean machine gun
- K-12, an obsolete process for Kodachrome photographic film

== Vehicles ==
=== Aircraft ===
- Kalinin K-12, a Soviet proof-of-concept aircraft
- Kawanishi K-12 Sakura, an experimental Japanese aircraft

=== Automobiles ===
- Kandi K12, a Chinese microcar
- Nissan Micra (K12), a Japanese subcompact car

=== Ships ===
- HMS Auricula (K12), a corvette of the Royal Navy
- HMS K12, a submarine of the Royal Navy
- HNLMS K XII, a submarine of the Royal Netherlands Navy
- HSwMS Malmö (K12), a corvette of the Swedish Navy

== Other uses ==
- K-12 (Kansas highway), a former highway in Kansas
- K12 (mountain)
- K12 Inc., now Stride, Inc., an American education company
