= Jerry Martinson =

American Jesuit missionary (1942–2017)

Personal details
- Born: Gerald George Martinson; December 2, 1942 San Diego, California
- Died: May 31, 2017 (aged 74) Taipei, Taiwan

Chinese name
- Traditional Chinese: 丁松筠
- Simplified Chinese: 丁松筠
Transcriptions
Standard Mandarin
- Hanyu Pinyin: Dīng Sōngyún
- Wade–Giles: Ting Sung-Yün
- IPA: [tíŋ sʊ́ŋy̌n]
Yue: Cantonese
- Jyutping: Ding1 Cung1wan4

Gerald George Martinson (Chinese: 丁松筠; December 2, 1942 – May 31, 2017), was an American Jesuit missionary, television personality and broadcast executive in Taiwan.

As a television producer, actor and television host, Martinson worked at Kuangchi Program Service (光啟社), Taipei, for over 40 years and has served as the president and later as vice president of Kuangchi Program Service (KPS).

Martinson was also the spokesperson for Giraffe English (長頸鹿美語), a multimedia English language school for children and young students in Taiwan and China.

== Life and career ==
Martinson was born on December 2, 1942, in San Diego, California, to Glenn and Lily Martinson. His younger brother, Barry Martinson, also became a Jesuit priest missionary in Taiwan.

When he was ten, Martinson's father died. While in high school, Martinson worked part time to help feed his family. After finishing high school, Martinson joined the Sacred Heart Novitiate in Los Gatos, California. After finishing seminary, Martinson became a missionary to Taiwan in 1967, settling in Hsinchu County.

The Chinese Regional Bishops' Conference in Taiwan announced on May 31, 2017, that Martinson had died of a heart attack at his home in Taiwan. He was posthumously awarded a Golden Bell Award for special contributions in September 2017. That December, Martinson was honored with a citation for lifetime achievement from the Ministry of Education.

== Filmography ==
=== Host ===
- TTV《ABC你和我－節奏美語》 produced by Kuangchi Program Service
- TTV《傑瑞叔叔劇場》
- TTV《傑瑞叔叔美語》
- CTS《傑瑞叔叔說英語》
- CTS《傑瑞美語時間》
- CTV、華視《傑瑞實用美語》
- CTV、華視《傑瑞實用英語》
- CTV《以愛還愛》（1986年12月30日17:00～18:00，全1集）
- •CTS educational channel《擁抱綻放在山崖邊的花朵》
- •CTS educational channel《擁抱燦爛在陽光下的大樹》
- Da Ai TV《孝孝青春》

=== Television series ===
- 中視連續劇《香妃》飾演郎世寧 (Jesuit artist Giuseppe Castiglione)

== Awards and honors ==
- 1986 : 23rd Golden Horse Awards – Winner of the Best Documentary award for Beyond the Killing Fields (殺戮戰場的邊緣)
- 1987 : 32nd Asia Pacific Film Festival – Winner of the Best Short Film award for Beyond the Killing Fields (殺戮戰場的邊緣)
- 2017 : 52nd Golden Bell Awards – Special Contribution Award
