= Jerry Brown =

Governor of California (1975–1983; 2011–2019)

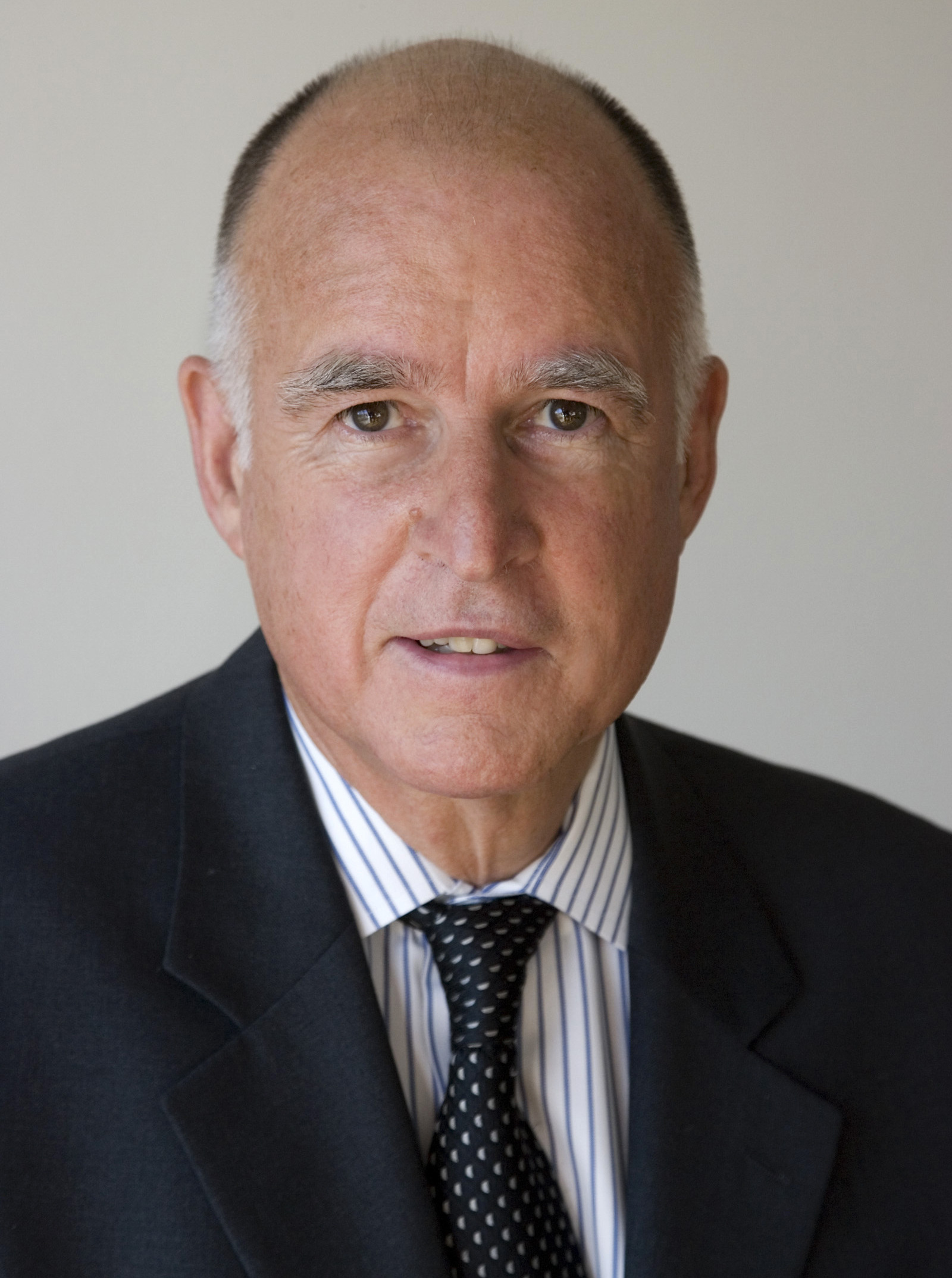
- Official portrait, 2006

34th & 39th Governor of California
- In office January 3, 2011 – January 7, 2019
- Lieutenant: Gavin Newsom
- Preceded by: Arnold Schwarzenegger
- Succeeded by: Gavin Newsom
- In office January 6, 1975 – January 3, 1983
- Lieutenant: Mervyn Dymally; Mike Curb
- Preceded by: Ronald Reagan
- Succeeded by: George Deukmejian

31st Attorney General of California
- In office January 8, 2007 – January 3, 2011
- Governor: Arnold Schwarzenegger
- Preceded by: Bill Lockyer
- Succeeded by: Kamala Harris

47th Mayor of Oakland
- In office January 4, 1999 – January 8, 2007
- Preceded by: Elihu Harris
- Succeeded by: Ron Dellums

23rd Secretary of State of California
- In office January 4, 1971 – January 6, 1975
- Governor: Ronald Reagan
- Preceded by: H. P. Sullivan (acting)
- Succeeded by: March Fong Eu

Chair of the California Democratic Party
- In office February 11, 1989 – March 3, 1991
- Preceded by: Peter D. Kelly III
- Succeeded by: Phil Angelides

Personal details
- Born: Edmund Gerald Brown Jr. April 7, 1938 (age 88) San Francisco, California, U.S.
- Party: Democratic
- Spouse: Anne Gust (m. 2005)
- Parents: Pat Brown; Bernice Layne
- Relatives: Kathleen Brown (sister)
- Education: Santa Clara University (attended); Sacred Heart Novitiate (attended); University of California, Berkeley (BA); Yale University (JD)
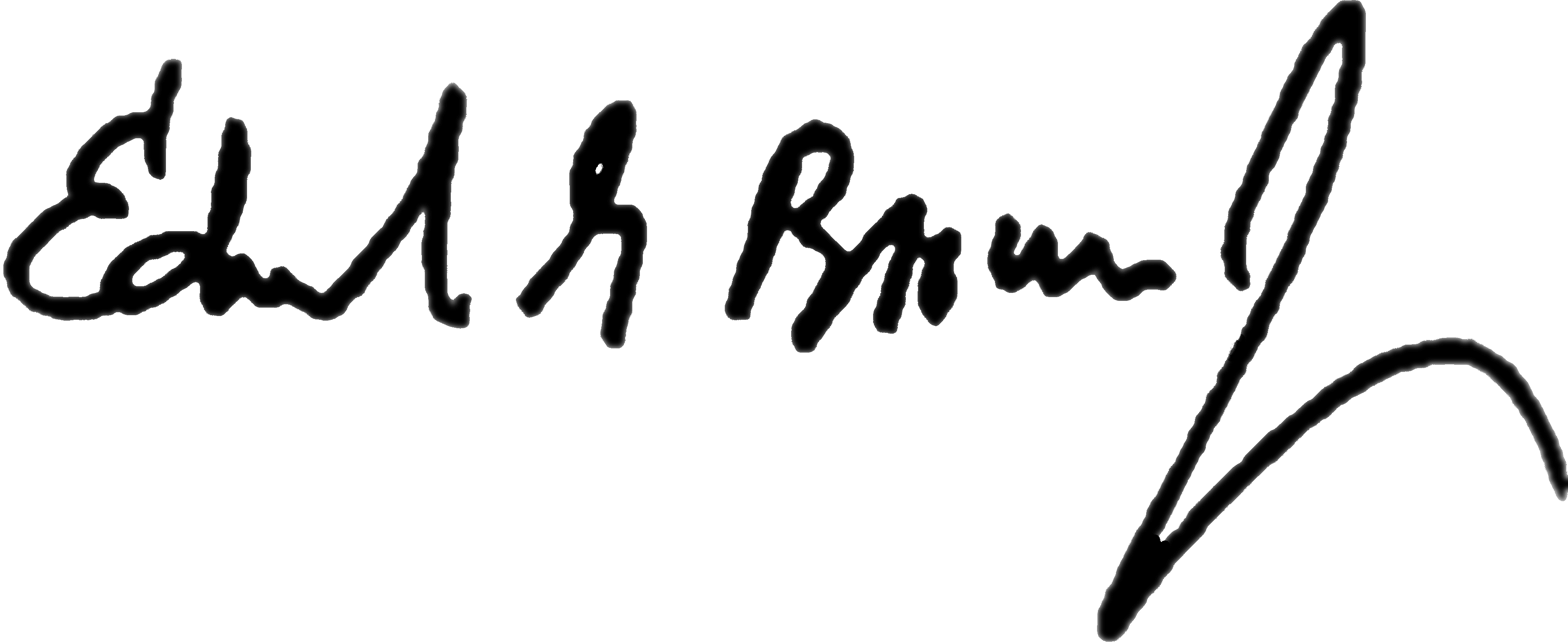
- Signature

Edmund Gerald Brown Jr. (born April 7, 1938) is an American lawyer, author, and politician who served as the 34th and 39th governor of California from 1975 to 1983 and 2011 to 2019. A member of the Democratic Party, he was elected secretary of state of California in 1970; Brown later served as the mayor of Oakland from 1999 to 2007 and the attorney general of California from 2007 to 2011. He was both the oldest and sixth-youngest governor of California due to the 28-year gap between his second and third terms. Upon completing his fourth term in office, Brown became the fourth-longest-serving governor in U.S. history (tied with Bill Janklow), serving 16 years and 5 days in office.

Born in San Francisco, he is the son of Bernice Layne Brown and Pat Brown, who was the 32nd governor of California (1959–1967). After graduating from the University of California, Berkeley and Yale Law School, he practiced law and began his political career as a member of the Los Angeles Community College District Board of Trustees (1969–1971). He was elected to serve as the 23rd secretary of state of California from 1971 to 1975. At 36, Brown was elected to his first term as governor in 1974, making him the youngest California governor in 111 years. In 1978, he won his second term. During his governorship, Brown ran unsuccessfully as a candidate for the Democratic presidential nomination in 1976 and 1980. He declined to pursue a third term as governor in 1982, instead making an unsuccessful run for the United States Senate that same year, losing to San Diego mayor and future governor Pete Wilson.

After traveling abroad, Brown returned to California and served as the sixth Chairman of the California Democratic Party (1989–1991), attempting to run for U.S. president once more in 1992 but losing the Democratic primary to Bill Clinton. He then moved to Oakland, where he hosted a talk radio show; Brown soon returned to public life, serving as mayor of Oakland (1999–2007) and attorney general of California (2007–2011). He ran for his third and fourth terms as governor in 2010 and 2014, his eligibility to do so having stemmed from California's constitutional grandfather clause. On October 7, 2013, he became the longest-serving governor in the history of California, surpassing Earl Warren.

== Early life, education, and private career ==
Brown was born in San Francisco, California, on April 7, 1938, the only son of four children born to district attorney of San Francisco and later governor of California, Edmund Gerald "Pat" Brown Sr., and his wife, Bernice Layne. Brown's father was of half-Irish and half-German descent. His great-grandfather August Schuckman, a German immigrant, settled in California in 1852 during the California Gold Rush.

Brown was a member of the California Cadet Corps at St. Ignatius High School, where he graduated in 1955. In 1955, Brown entered Santa Clara University for a year and left to attend Sacred Heart Novitiate, a Jesuit novice house in Los Gatos, intent on becoming a Catholic priest. Brown resided at the novitiate from August 1956 to January 1960 before enrolling at the University of California, Berkeley, where he graduated with a Bachelor of Arts in classics (with a focus on Latin and Greek) in 1961. With his tuition paid for by the Louis Lurie Foundation, including a $675 scholarship in 1963, Brown went on to Yale Law School and graduated with a Juris Doctor in 1964. After law school, Brown worked as a law clerk for California Supreme Court justice Mathew Tobriner.

An opponent of the death penalty, 1960 Brown lobbied his father (then governor) to spare the life of Caryl Chessman and reportedly won a 60-day stay for him.

Returning to California, Brown took the state bar exam and passed on his second attempt. He then settled in Los Angeles and joined the law firm of Tuttle & Taylor. In 1969, Brown ran for the newly created Los Angeles Community College Board of Trustees, which oversaw community colleges in the city; he placed first in a field of 124 and served until 1971.

== California secretary of state (1971–1975) ==
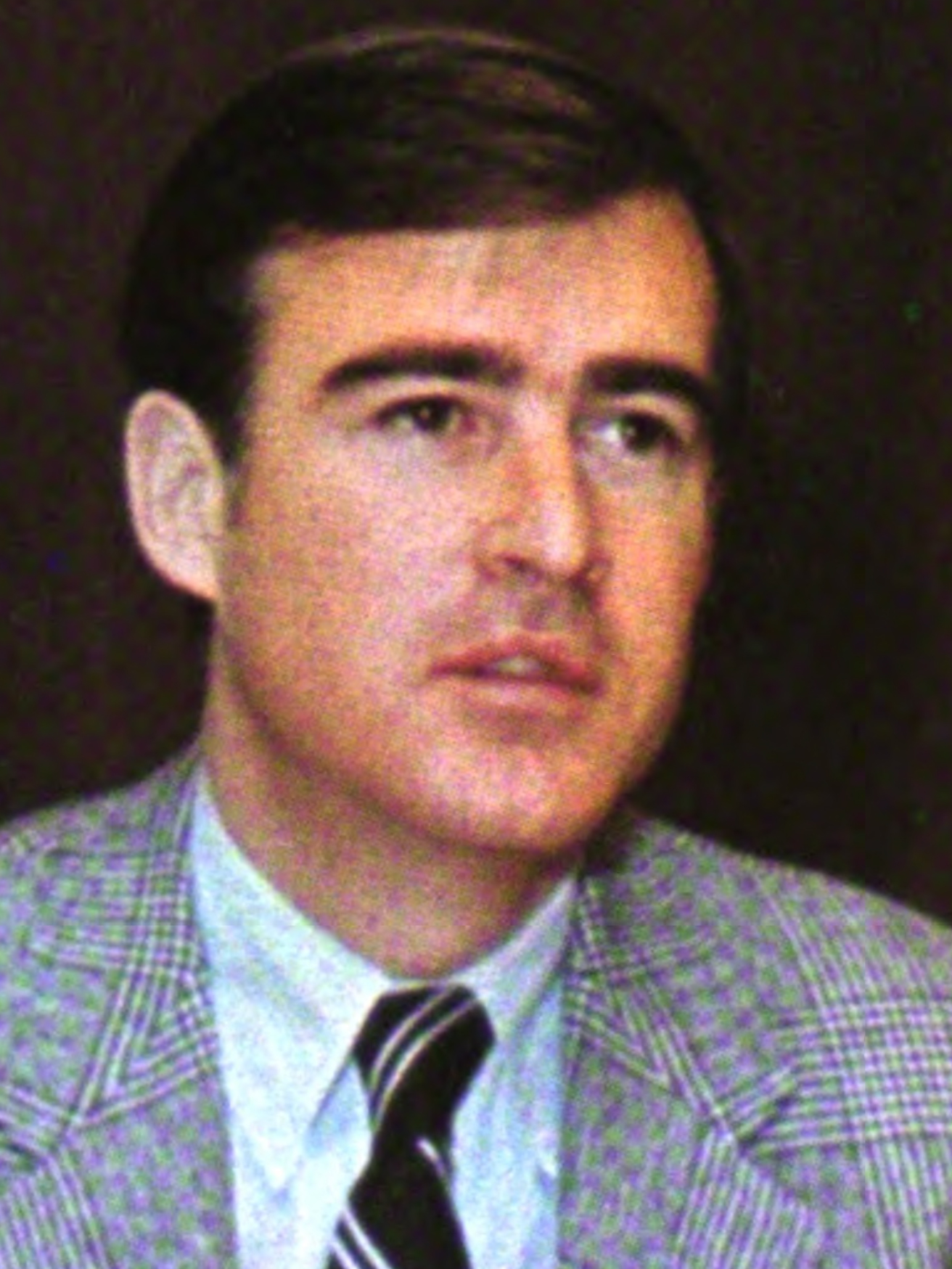
Official portrait, 1971

In 1970, Brown was elected California secretary of state. Brown argued before the California Supreme Court and won cases against Standard Oil of California, International Telephone and Telegraph, Gulf Oil, and Mobil for election law violations. In addition, he forced legislators to comply with campaign disclosure laws. Brown also drafted and helped to pass the California Political Reform Act of 1974, Proposition 9, passed by 70% of California's voters in June 1974. Among other provisions, it established the California Fair Political Practices Commission.

== 34th governor of California (1975–1983) ==
=== First term ===
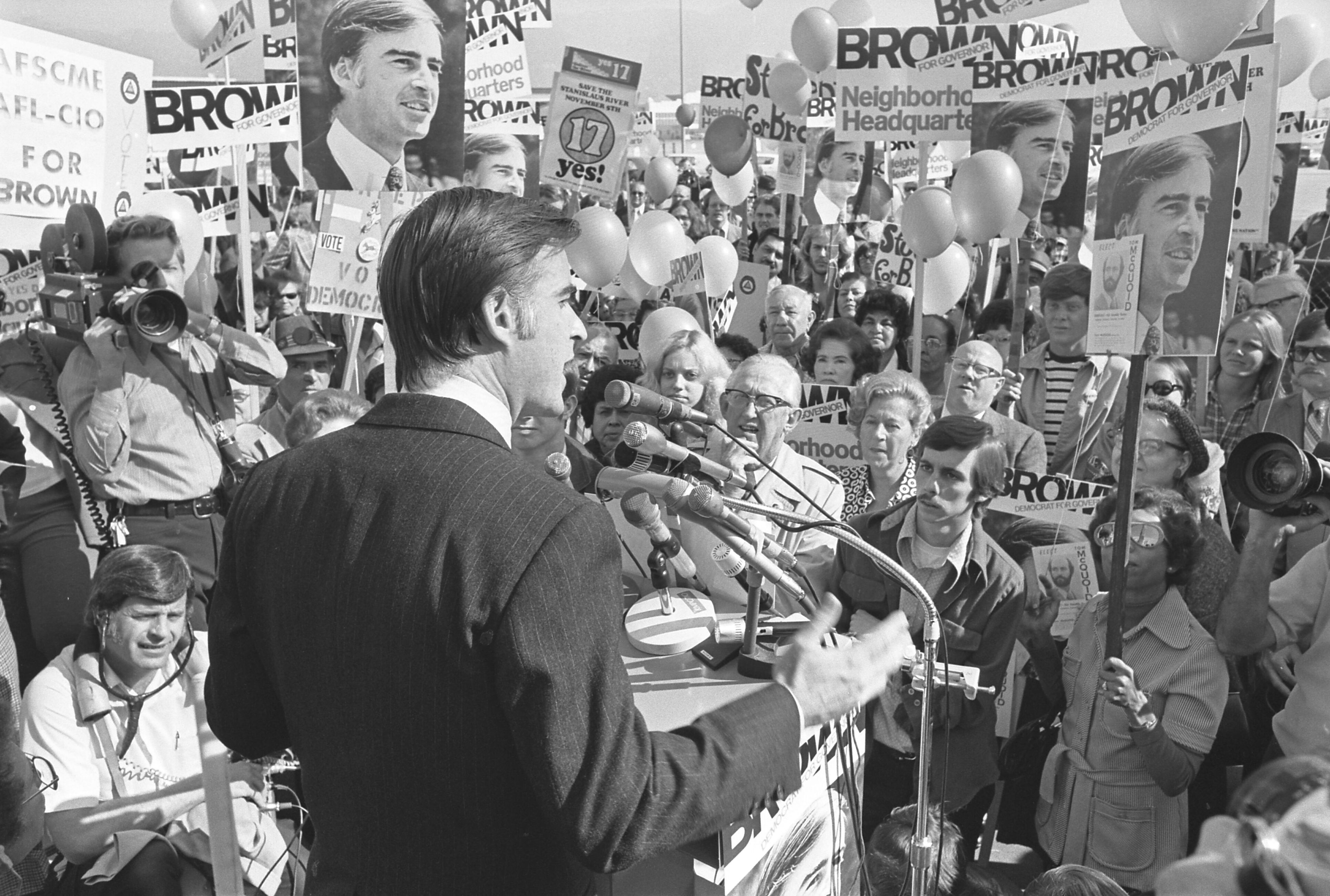
Brown speaking with supporters in 1974

In 1974, Brown ran in a highly contested Democratic primary for Governor of California against speaker of the California Assembly Bob Moretti, San Francisco mayor Joseph L. Alioto, Representative Jerome R. Waldie, and others. Brown won the primary with the name recognition of his father, Pat Brown, whom many people admired for his progressive administration. In the general election on November 5, 1974, Brown was elected Governor of California over California state controller Houston I. Flournoy; Republicans ascribed the loss to anti-Republican feelings from Watergate, the election being held only ninety days after President Richard Nixon resigned from office. Brown succeeded Republican governor Ronald Reagan, who retired after two terms.

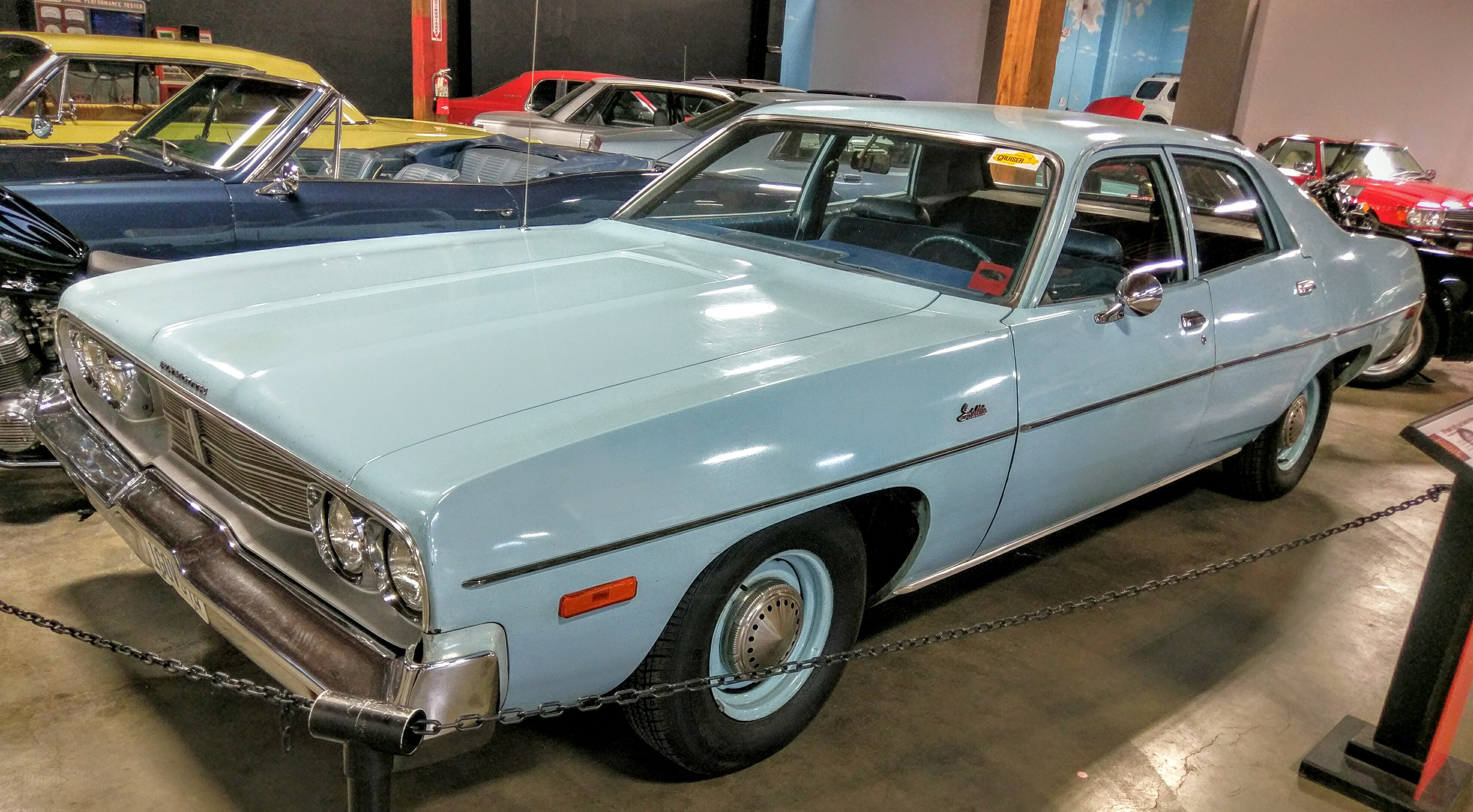
Jerry Brown selected two frugal 1974 Plymouth Satellites from the state motor pool for his use in Northern California and Southern California. This is one of them, on display at the California Automobile Museum.

After taking office, Brown gained a reputation as a fiscal conservative. The American Conservative later noted he was "much more of a fiscal conservative than Governor Reagan". His fiscal restraint resulted in one of the biggest budget surpluses in state history, roughly $5 billion. For his personal life, Brown refused many of the privileges and perks of the office, forgoing the newly constructed 20,000 square-foot governor's residence in the suburb of Carmichael and instead renting a $275-per-month apartment at 1228 N Street, adjacent to Capitol Park in downtown Sacramento. Rather than riding as a passenger in a chauffeured limousine as previous governors had done, Brown walked to work and drove in a Plymouth Satellite sedan. When Gray Davis, who was chief of staff to Governor Brown, suggested that a hole in the rug in the governor's office be fixed, Brown responded: "That hole will save the state at least $500 million, because legislators cannot come down and pound on my desk demanding lots of money for their pet programs while looking at a hole in my rug!"

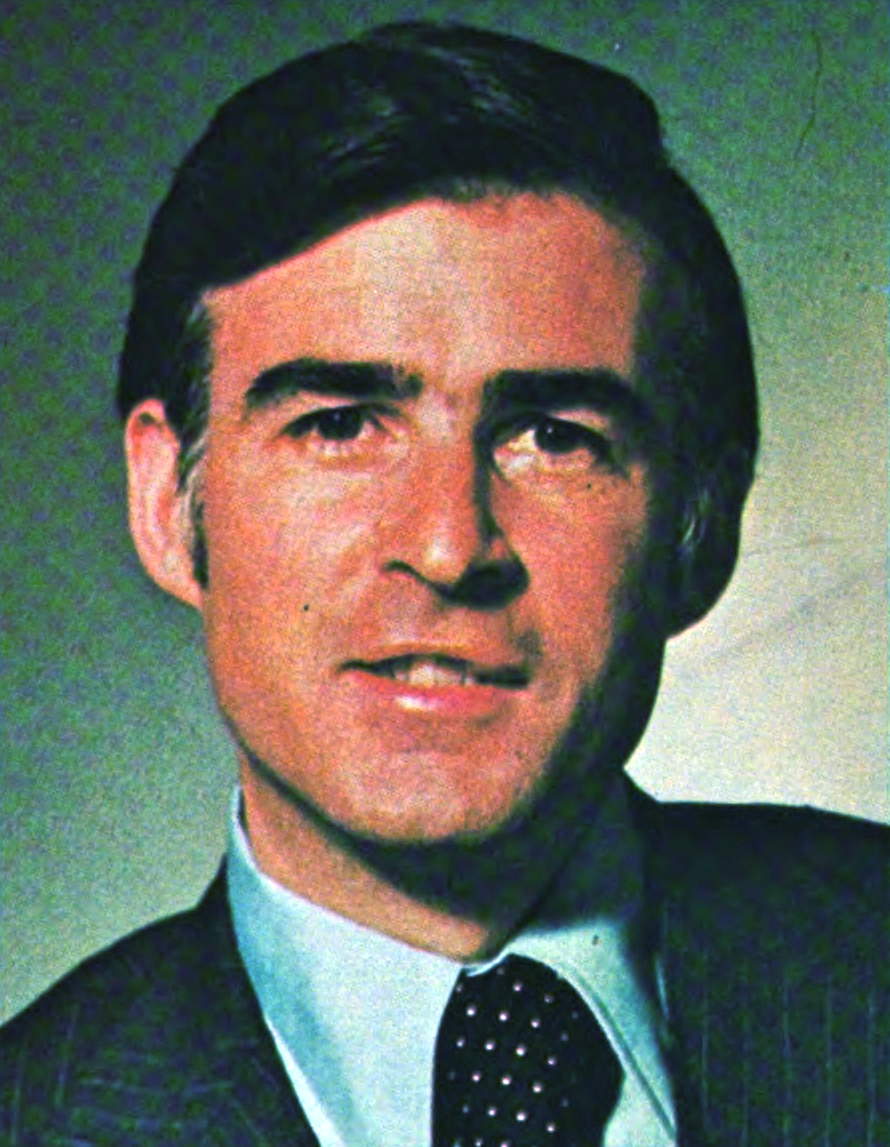
Official portrait, 1975

As governor, Brown took a strong interest in environmental issues. He appointed J. Baldwin to work in the newly created California Office of Appropriate Technology, Sim Van der Ryn as State Architect, Stewart Brand as Special Advisor, John Bryson as chairman of the California State Water Board. Brown also reorganized the California Arts Council, boosting its funding by 1300 percent and appointing artists to the council, and appointed more women and minorities to office than any other previous California governor. In 1977, he sponsored the "first-ever tax incentive for rooftop solar", among many environmental initiatives. In 1975, Brown obtained the repeal of the "depletion allowance", a tax break for the state's oil industry, despite the efforts of lobbyist Joseph C. Shell, a former intraparty rival to Nixon.

In 1975, Brown opposed Vietnamese immigration to California, saying that the state had enough poor people. He added, "There is something a little strange about saying 'Let's bring in 500,000 more people' when we can't take care of the 1 million (Californians) out of work."

Brown strongly opposed the death penalty and vetoed it as governor, which the legislature overrode in 1977. He also appointed judges who opposed capital punishment. One of these appointments, Rose Bird as the chief justice of the California Supreme Court, was voted out in 1987 after a strong campaign financed by business interests upset by her "pro-labor" and "pro-free speech" rulings. The death penalty was only "a trumped-up excuse" to use against her, even though the Bird Court consistently upheld the constitutionality of the death penalty.

Brown was both in favor of a Balanced Budget Amendment and initially opposed to Proposition 13, the latter of which would decrease property taxes and greatly reduce revenue to cities and counties. After Prop 13 passed in June 1978, he changed course and declared himself a "born-again tax cutter." He heavily cut state spending, and along with the Legislature, spent much of the $5 billion surplus to meet the proposition's requirements and help offset the revenue losses which made cities, counties, and schools more dependent on the state. His actions in response to the proposition earned him praise from Proposition 13 author Howard Jarvis who went as far as to make a television commercial for Brown just before his successful re-election bid in 1978. The controversial proposition immediately cut tax revenues and required a two-thirds supermajority to raise taxes. Max Neiman, a professor at the Institute of Governmental Studies at University of California, Berkeley, credited Brown for "bailing out local government and school districts", but felt it was harmful "because it made it easier for people to believe that Proposition 13 wasn't harmful". In an interview in 2014, Brown indicated that a "war chest" would have helped his campaign for an alternative to Proposition 13.

During his first term, Brown also signed into law various measures improving labor rights and social security. Amongst others, these included collective bargaining for school employees and teachers, the extension of unemployment benefits to farmworkers, prohibiting the employment of professional strikebreakers in labor disputes, and improved rights for farm labor.

=== 1976 presidential campaign ===
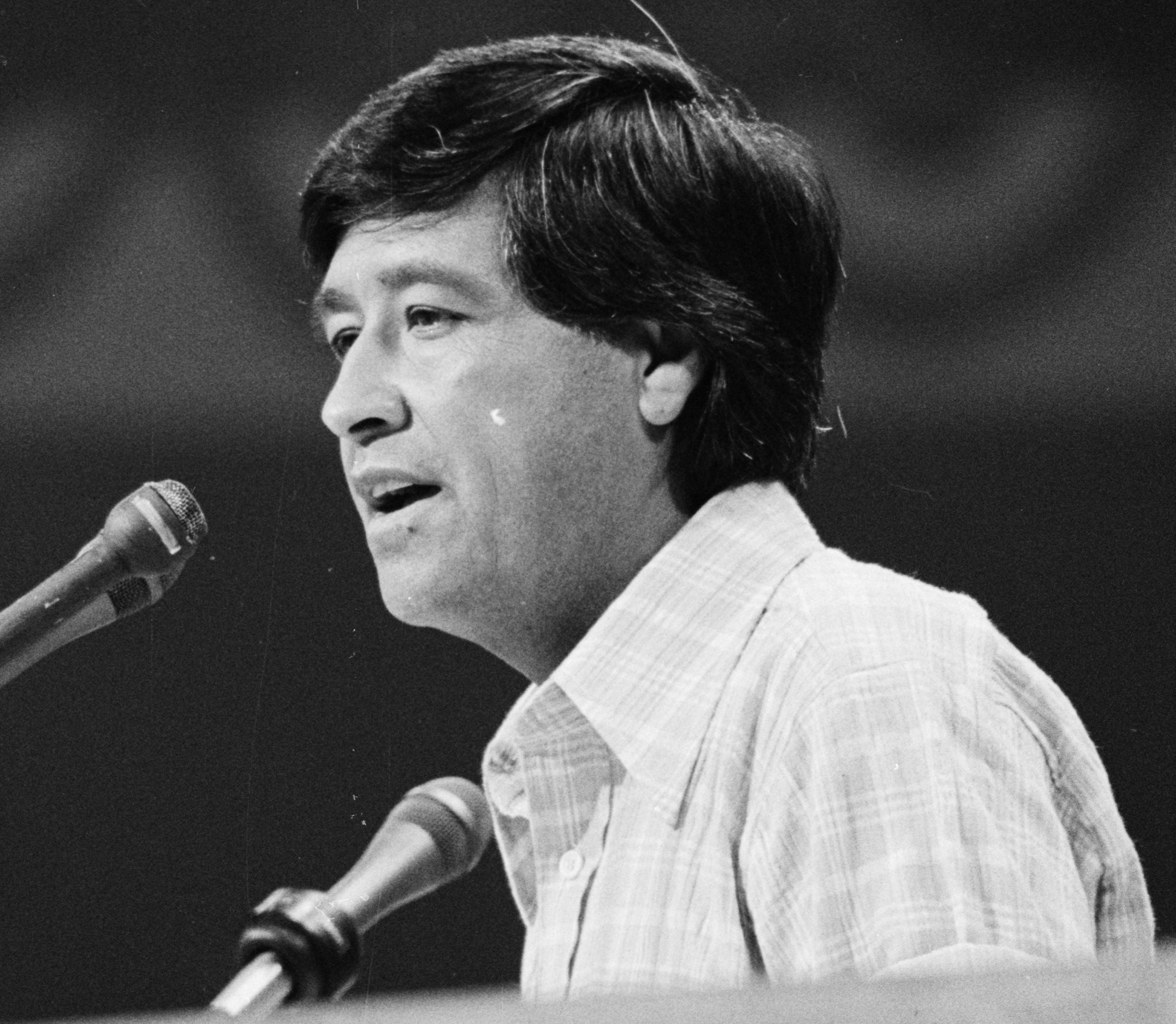
Cesar Chavez nominating Brown at the 1976 Democratic National Convention

Brown began his first campaign for the Democratic nomination for president on March 16, 1976, late in the primary season and over a year after some candidates had started campaigning. Brown declared: "The country is rich, but not so rich as we have been led to believe. The choice to do one thing may preclude another. In short, we are entering an era of limits."

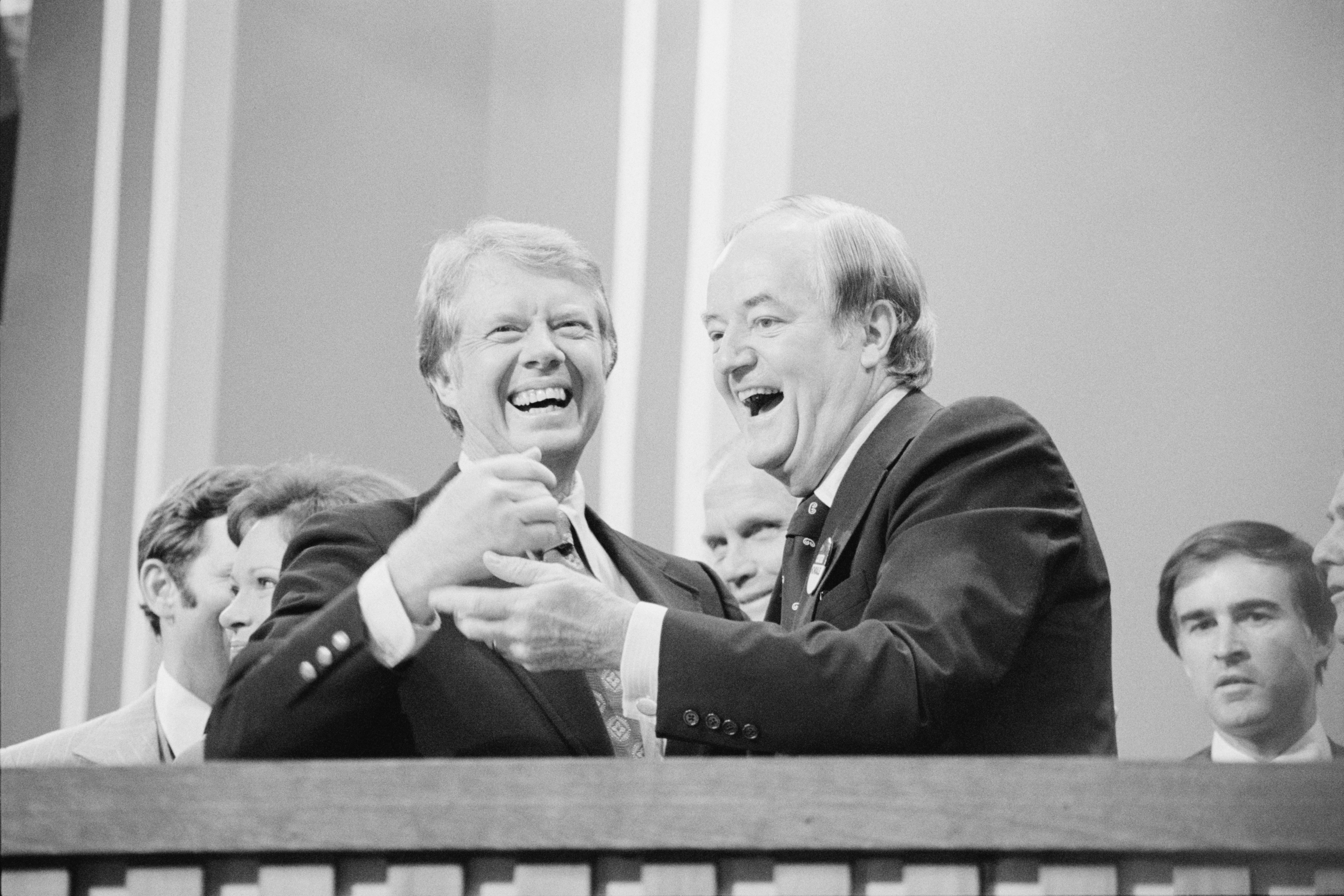
Brown (far right) looks on as Jimmy Carter and Hubert Humphrey celebrate on the last day of the 1976 DNC.

Brown's name began appearing on primary ballots in May and he won in Maryland, Nevada, and his home state of California. He missed the deadline in Oregon, but he ran as a write-in candidate and finished in third behind Former Georgia Governor Jimmy Carter and Senator Frank Church of Idaho. Brown is often credited with winning the New Jersey and Rhode Island primaries, but in reality, uncommitted slates of delegates that Brown advocated in those states finished first.

With support from Louisiana governor Edwin Edwards, Brown won a majority of delegates at the Louisiana delegate selection convention; thus, Louisiana was the only southern state to not support Southerners Carter or Alabama governor George Wallace. Despite this success, he was unable to stall Carter's momentum, and his rival was nominated on the first ballot at the 1976 Democratic National Convention. Brown finished third with roughly 300 delegate votes, narrowly behind Congressman Morris Udall but significantly behind Carter.

=== Second term ===
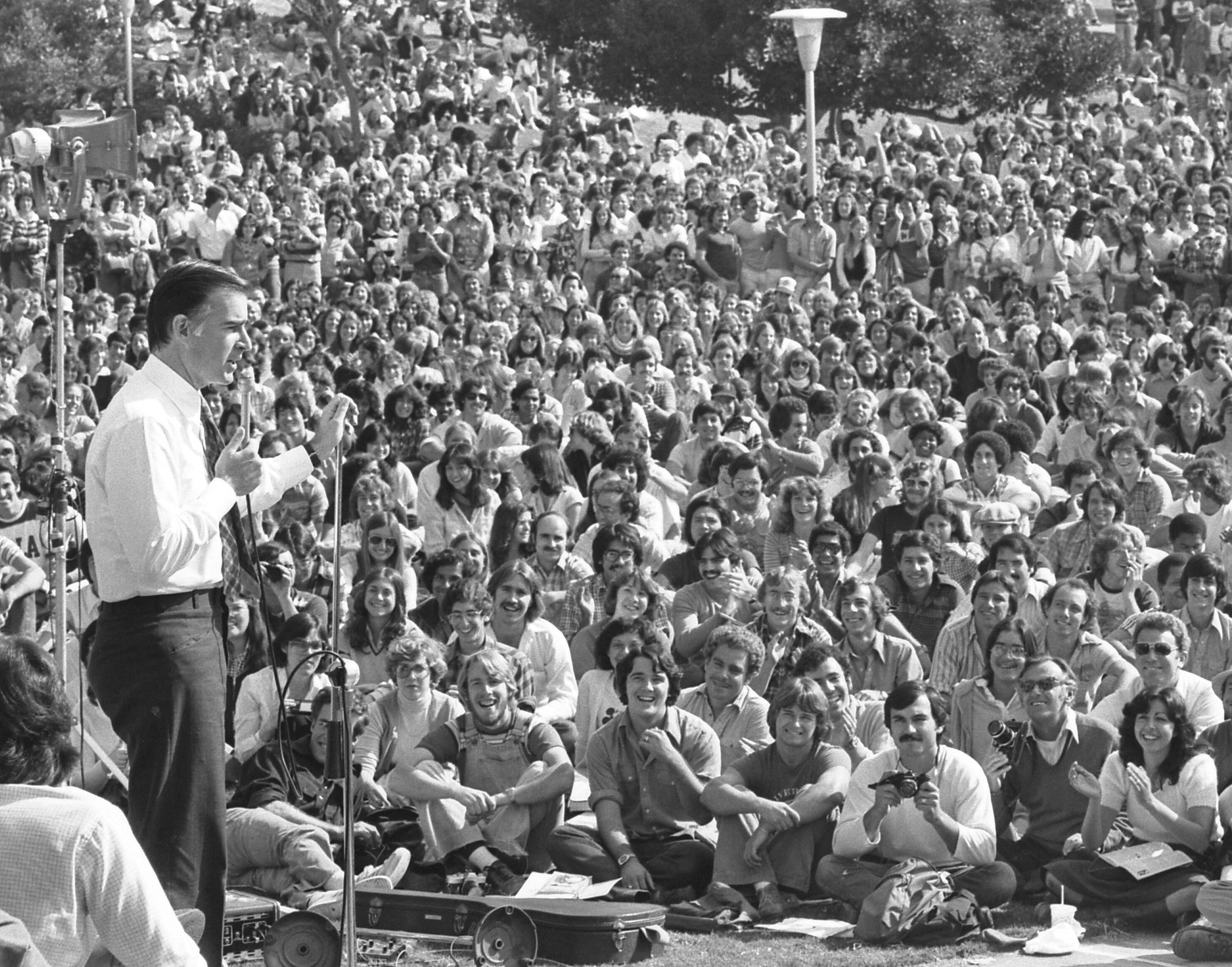
Brown speaking at a re-election rally in 1978

Brown won re-election in 1978 against Republican state attorney general Evelle J. Younger. Brown appointed the first openly gay judge in the United States when he named Stephen Lachs to serve on the Los Angeles County Superior Court in 1979. In 1981, he also appointed the first openly lesbian judge in the United States, Mary C. Morgan, to the San Francisco Municipal Court. Brown completed his second term having appointed a total of five gay judges, including Rand Schrader and Jerold Krieger. Through his first term as governor, Brown had not appointed any openly gay people to any position, but he cited the failed 1978 Briggs Initiative, which sought to ban homosexuals from working in California's public schools, for his increased support of gay rights. The governor also signed AB 489, The Consenting Adult Sex Act, which decriminalized homosexual behavior between adults, adding to this reputation. He did, however, sign AB 607, which barred homosexual couples from receiving civil marriage licenses, in 1977.

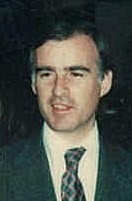
Brown in 1978

Brown championed the Peripheral Canal project to transport water from near Sacramento around the Sacramento-San Joaquin Delta into the Central Valley Project and export it to southern California. It was submitted to the voters for approval as a ballot proposition in 1982, but was turned down.

In 1981, Brown, who had established a reputation as a strong environmentalist, was confronted with a serious medfly infestation in the San Francisco Bay Area. The state's agricultural industry advised him, and the US Department of Agriculture's Animal and Plant Health Inspection Service (APHIS), to authorize airborne spraying of the region. Initially, in accordance with his environmental protection stance, he chose to authorize ground-level spraying only. Unfortunately, the infestation spread as the medfly reproductive cycle out-paced the spraying. After more than a month, millions of dollars of crops had been destroyed, and billions of dollars more were threatened. Governor Brown then authorized a massive response to the infestation. Fleets of helicopters sprayed malathion at night, and the California National Guard set up highway checkpoints and collected many tons of local fruit; in the final stage of the campaign, entomologists released millions of sterile male medflies in an attempt to disrupt the insects' reproductive cycle.

Ultimately, the infestation was eradicated, but both the governor's delay and the scale of the action have remained controversial ever since. Some people claimed that malathion was toxic to humans, as well as insects. In response to such concerns, Brown's chief of staff, B. T. Collins, staged a news conference during which he publicly drank a glass of malathion. Many people complained that, while the malathion may not have been very toxic to humans, the aerosol spray containing it was corrosive to car paint.

In 1976, Brown proposed the establishment of a state space academy and the purchasing of a satellite that would be launched into orbit to provide emergency communications for the state. Chicago columnist Mike Royko mocked the idea as superfluous, dubbing him as "Governor Moonbeam". A similar proposal was eventually adopted, and Royko later expressed regret for his role in the affair; he disavowed it entirely in 1991, proclaiming Brown to be just as serious as any other politician.

Some notable figures were given priority correspondence access to him in either advisory or personal roles. These included United Farm Workers of America founder Cesar Chavez, Hewlett-Packard co-founder David Packard, labor leader Jack Henning, and Charles Manatt, then-Chairman of the California State Democratic Party. Mail was routed as VIP to be delivered directly to the governor. However, it is unclear as to exactly how long this may have occurred.

In 1978, San Francisco punk band the Dead Kennedys' first single, "California über alles", from the album Fresh Fruit for Rotting Vegetables, was released; it was performed from the perspective of then-governor Brown painting a picture of a hippie-fascist state, satirizing what they considered his mandating of liberal ideas in a fascist manner, commenting on what lyricist Jello Biafra saw as the corrosive nature of power. The imaginary Brown had become President Brown presiding over secret police and gas chambers. Biafra later said in an interview with Nardwuar that he now feels differently about Brown; as it turned out, Brown was not as bad as Biafra thought he would be, and subsequent songs have been written about other politicians deemed worse.

Brown chose not to run for a third term in 1982, and instead ran for the United States Senate, but lost to San Diego mayor Pete Wilson. He was succeeded as governor by George Deukmejian, then state attorney general, on January 3, 1983.

=== 1980 presidential election ===
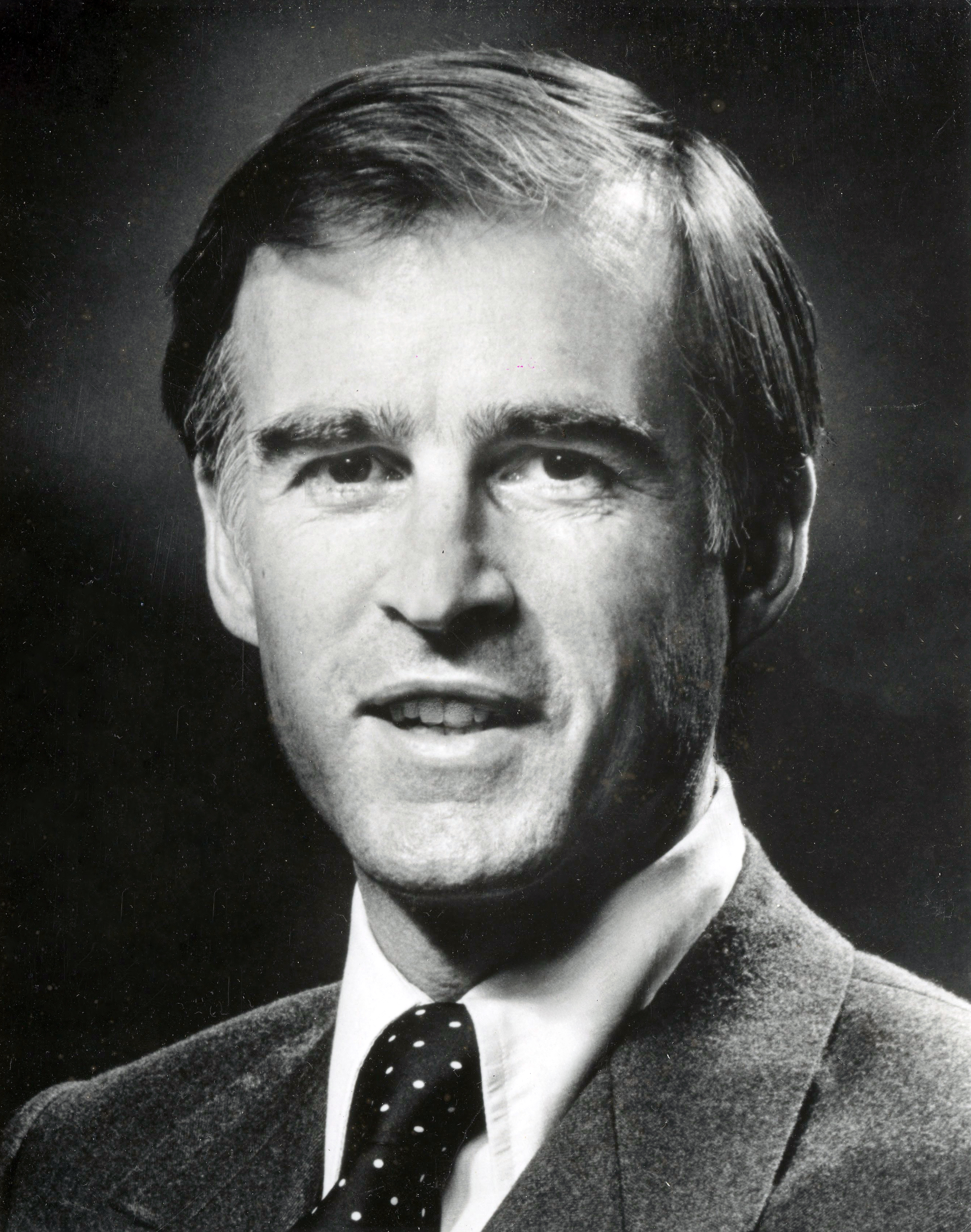
Brown in 1980

In 1980, Brown challenged Carter for renomination. The press had anticipated his candidacy ever since he won re-election as governor in 1978 over the Republican Evelle Younger by 1.3 million votes, the largest margin in California history. But Brown had trouble gaining traction in both fundraising and polling for the presidential nomination. This was widely believed to be because of the more prominent candidate Senator Ted Kennedy of Massachusetts. Brown's 1980 platform, which he declared to be the natural result of combining Buckminster Fuller's visions of the future and E. F. Schumacher's theory of "Buddhist economics", was much expanded from 1976. His "era of limits" slogan was replaced by a promise to, in his words, "Protect the Earth, serve the people, and explore the universe".

Three main planks of his platform were a call for a constitutional convention to ratify the Balanced Budget Amendment; a promise to increase funds for the space program as a "first step in bringing us toward a solar-powered space satellite to provide solar energy for this planet"; and, in the wake of the 1979 Three Mile Island accident, opposition to nuclear power. On the subject of the 1979 energy crisis, Brown decried the "Faustian bargain" that he claimed Carter had entered into with the oil industry, and declared that he would greatly increase federal funding of research into solar power. He endorsed the idea of mandatory non-military national service for the nation's youth. He suggested that the Defense Department cut back on support troops while beefing up the number of combat troops.

Brown opposed Kennedy's call for universal national health insurance and opposed Carter's call for an employer mandate to provide catastrophic private health insurance, labeling it socialist. As an alternative, he suggested a program of tax credits for those who do not smoke or otherwise damage their health, saying: "Those who abuse their bodies should not abuse the rest of us by taking our tax dollars." Brown also called for expanding the use of acupuncture and midwifery.

As Brown's campaign began to attract more members of what some more conservative commentators described as "the fringe", including activists like Jane Fonda, Tom Hayden, and Jesse Jackson, his polling numbers began to suffer. Brown received only 10 percent of the vote in the New Hampshire primary, and he was soon forced to announce that his decision to remain in the race would depend on a good showing in the Wisconsin primary. Although he had polled well there throughout the primary season, an attempt to film a live speech in Madison, the state's capital, and produce from it a special effects-filled, 30-minute commercial (produced and directed by Francis Ford Coppola) was disastrous.

== Senate defeat and public life ==
In 1982, Brown chose not to seek a third term as governor; instead, he ran for the United States Senate for the seat being vacated by Republican S. I. Hayakawa. He was defeated by Republican San Diego mayor Pete Wilson by a margin of 52% to 45%. After his Senate defeat, Brown was left with few political options. Republican George Deukmejian, a Brown critic, narrowly won the governorship in 1982, succeeding Brown, and was re-elected overwhelmingly in 1986. After his Senate defeat in 1982, many considered Brown's political career to be over.

Brown traveled to Japan to study Buddhism, studying with Christian/Zen practitioner Hugo Enomiya-Lassalle under Yamada Koun-roshi. In an interview, he explained, "Since politics is based on illusions, zazen definitely provides new insights for a politician. I then come back into the world of California and politics, with critical distance from some of my more comfortable assumptions." He also visited Mother Teresa in Calcutta, India, where he ministered to the sick in one of her hospices. He explained, "Politics is a power struggle to get to the top of the heap. Calcutta and Mother Teresa are about working with those who are at the bottom of the heap. And to see them as no different from yourself, and their needs as important as your needs. And you're there to serve them, and doing that you are attaining as great a state of being as you can."

Upon his return from abroad in 1988, Brown announced that he would stand as a candidate to become chairman of the California Democratic Party, and won against investment banker Steve Westly. Although Brown greatly expanded the party's donor base and enlarged its coffers, with a focus on grassroots organizing and get out the vote drives, he was criticized for not spending enough money on TV ads, which was felt to have contributed to Democratic losses in several close races in 1990, such as Dianne Feinstein's attempt to become the first female governor of California. In early 1991, Brown abruptly resigned his post and announced that he would run for the Senate seat held by the retiring Alan Cranston. Although Brown consistently led in the polls for both the nomination and the general election, he abandoned the campaign, deciding instead to run for the presidency for the third time.

== 1992 presidential election ==
When Brown announced his intention to run for president against President George H. W. Bush, many in the media and his own party dismissed his campaign as having little chance of gaining significant support. Ignoring them, Brown embarked on a grassroots campaign to, in his own words, "take back America from the confederacy of corruption, careerism, and campaign consulting in Washington". In his stump speech, first used while announcing his candidacy on the steps of Independence Hall in Philadelphia, Brown said he would accept campaign contributions from individuals only and that he would not accept more than $100. Continuing with his reform theme, he assailed what he dubbed "the bipartisan Incumbent Party in Washington" and called for term limits for members of Congress. Citing various recent scandals on Capitol Hill, particularly the recent House banking scandal and the large congressional pay raises of 1990, he promised to put an end to Congress being a "Stop-and-Shop for the moneyed special interests".

As Brown campaigned in various primary states, he expanded his platform beyond a policy of strict campaign finance reform. Although he focused on a variety of issues during the campaign, he highlighted his endorsement of living wage laws and opposition to free trade agreements such as NAFTA; he mostly concentrated on his tax policy, which had been created specifically for him by Arthur Laffer, the famous supporter of supply-side economics who created the Laffer curve. This plan, which called for the replacement of the progressive income tax with a flat tax and a value added tax, both at a fixed 13% rate, was decried by his opponents as regressive. Nevertheless, it was endorsed by The New York Times, The New Republic, and Forbes, and its raising of taxes on corporations and elimination of various loopholes that tended to favor the very wealthy proved popular with voters. Various opinion polls at the time found that as many as three-quarters of Americans believed the current tax code was biased toward the wealthy. Jesse Walker wrote in The American Conservative that he "seemed to be the most left-wing and right-wing man in the field ... [calling] for term limits, a flat tax, reforming social security, and the abolition of the Department of Education". Brown scored surprising wins in Connecticut and Colorado and seemed poised to overtake Clinton.

Due to his limited budget, Brown began to use a mixture of alternative media and unusual fundraising techniques. Unable to pay for actual commercials, he frequently used cable television and talk radio interviews as a form of free media to get his message out. To raise funds, he purchased a toll-free telephone number. During the campaign, Brown's repetition of this number and moralistic language led some to call him a "political televangelist" with an "anti-politics gospel".

Despite poor showings in the Iowa caucus (1.6%) and the New Hampshire primary (8%), Brown won narrow victories in Maine, Colorado, Nevada, and Vermont, but he continued to be considered a small threat for much of the campaign. It was not until shortly after Super Tuesday, when the field had been narrowed to Brown, former senator Paul Tsongas of Massachusetts, and front-runner then-governor Bill Clinton of Arkansas, that Brown began to emerge as a major contender in the eyes of the press. On March 17, Brown received a strong third-place showing in the Illinois and Michigan primaries, and Tsongas dropped out of the race. A week later, he cemented his position as a major threat to Clinton when he eked out a narrow win in the bitterly fought Connecticut primary.

As the press focused on the primaries in New York and Wisconsin, which were held on the same day, Brown, who had taken the lead in polls in both states, made a gaffe: he announced to an audience of various leaders of New York City's Jewish community that, if nominated, he would consider Jesse Jackson as his running mate. Jackson, who had made a pair of antisemitic comments about Jews in general, and New York City's Jews in particular, while running for president in 1984, was still mistrusted by the Jewish community. Jackson also had ties to Louis Farrakhan, infamous for his own antisemitic statements, and to Yasir Arafat, the chairman of the Palestine Liberation Organization. Brown's polling numbers suffered. On April 7, he lost narrowly to Bill Clinton in Wisconsin (37%–34%), and dramatically in New York (41%–26%).

Brown continued to campaign, but won no further primaries. Despite being overwhelmingly outspent, he won upset victories in seven states and his "votes won to the money raised ratio" was by far the best of any candidate's in the race. He had a sizable number of delegates, and a big win in his home state of California would have deprived Clinton of sufficient support to win the Democratic nomination, possibly bringing about a brokered convention. After nearly a month of intense campaigning and multiple debates between the two candidates, Clinton managed to defeat Brown in this final primary, 48% to 41%. Brown did not win the nomination, but was able to boast of one accomplishment: at the following month's Democratic National Convention, he received the votes of 596 delegates on the first ballot, more than any other candidate but Clinton. He spoke at the convention, and to the national viewing audience, yet without endorsing Clinton, through the device of seconding his own nomination. There was animosity between the Brown and Clinton campaigns, and Brown was the first political figure to criticize Bill Clinton over what became known as the Whitewater controversy.

== Move to Oakland ==
After his 1992 presidential bid, Brown had moved from the Pacific Heights neighborhood of San Francisco to the Jack London District neighborhood of Oakland, California, an "overwhelmingly minority city of 400,000". He constructed a multi-million dollar work-live complex, serving both as his residence and as a workspace. Among other features, it included a broadcast studio and a 400-seat auditorium.

Brown launched a national talk radio show from his Oakland complex, which he would continue to produce until October 1997.

In 1995, with Brown's political career at a low point, in the motion picture Jade, the fictional governor of California tells an assistant district attorney to drop a case, "unless you want as much of a future in this state as Jerry Brown". The assistant DA responds, "Who's Jerry Brown?"

In Oakland, Brown became involved as an activist in local political matters, including bay-front development and campaign finance reform. In 1996, Brown unsuccessfully urged Oakland mayor Elihu Harris to appoint him to a seat on the Oakland Port Commission.

== Mayor of Oakland (1999–2007) ==
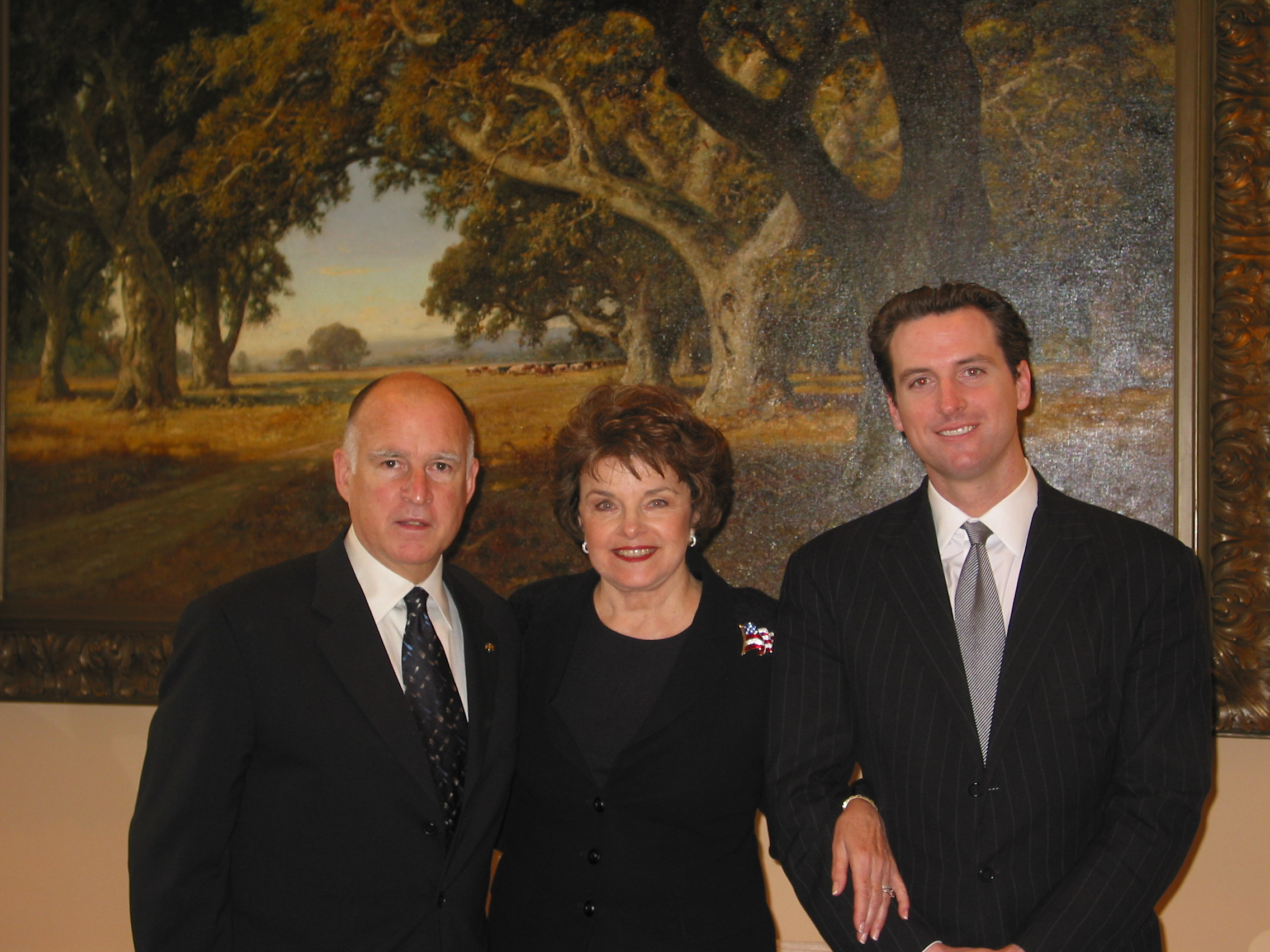
Mayor Jerry Brown (left) with U.S. senator Dianne Feinstein (middle) and San Francisco mayor Gavin Newsom (right) in 2007

After Oakland mayor Elihu Harris decided against seeking reelection, Brown ran in the city's 1998 mayoral election as an independent "having left the Democratic Party, blasting what he called the 'deeply corrupted' two-party system". He won with 59% of the vote in a field of ten candidates.

Prior to taking office, Brown campaigned to get the approval of the electorate to convert Oakland's "weak mayor" political structure, which structured the mayor as chairman of the city council and official greeter, to a "strong mayor" structure, where the mayor would act as chief executive over the nonpolitical and thus the various city departments, and break tie votes on the Oakland City Council. In November 1998, Oakland's electorate voted by a landslide margin of 3 to 1 in support of Measure X, which would shift the city government to the strong mayor model for a period of six years. A referendum permanently extending Measure X later passed in 2004, after failing to pass in 2002, thus making permanent the city's shift to the strong mayor model of governance.

The political left had hoped for some of the more progressive politics from Brown's earlier governorship, but found Brown, as mayor, to be "more pragmatic than progressive, more interested in downtown redevelopment and economic growth than political ideology". As mayor, he invited the U.S. Marine Corps to use Oakland harbor lands for mock military exercises as part of Operation Urban Warrior.

The city was rapidly losing residents and businesses, and Brown is credited with starting the revitalization of the city using his connections and experience to lessen the economic downturn while attracting $1 billion of investments, including refurbishing the Fox Theatre, the Port of Oakland, and Jack London Square. The downtown district was losing retailers, restaurateurs and residential developers, and Brown sought to attract thousands of new residents with disposable income to revitalize the area. Brown continued his predecessor Elihu Harris's public policy of supporting downtown housing development in the area defined as the Central Business District in Oakland's 1998 General Plan. Since Brown worked toward the stated goal of bringing an additional 10,000 residents to Downtown Oakland, his plan was known as the "10k Plan". It has resulted in redevelopment projects in the Jack London District, where Brown himself had earlier purchased and later sold an industrial warehouse which he used as a personal residence, and in the Lakeside Apartments District near Lake Merritt. The 10K plan has touched the historic Old Oakland district, the Chinatown district, the Uptown district, and Downtown. Brown surpassed the stated goal of attracting 10,000 residents according to city records, and built more affordable housing than previous mayoral administrations.

Brown had campaigned on fixing Oakland's schools, but "bureaucratic battles" dampened his efforts. He concedes he never had control of the schools, and his reform efforts were "largely a bust". He focused instead on the creation of two charter schools, the Oakland School for the Arts and the Oakland Military Institute. Defending his support of a military charter school in Oakland, Brown once told KQED reporter Stephen Talbot, "I believe that had I been sent to the military academy, as my mother and father threatened, I would have been president a long time ago."

Brown sponsored nearly two dozen initiatives to reduce the crime rate, and although crime decreased by 13 percent overall, the city still suffered a "57 percent spike in homicides his final year in office, to 148 overall".

Brown's largely successful first term as mayor of Oakland was documented in a one-hour KQED documentary, The Celebrity and the City (2001), that evaluated his record in dealing with his four stated goals: reducing crime, improving education, attracting 10,000 new residents to a resurgent downtown, and encouraging the arts.

Brown was reelected as mayor in 2002.

== Attorney general of California (2007–2011) ==
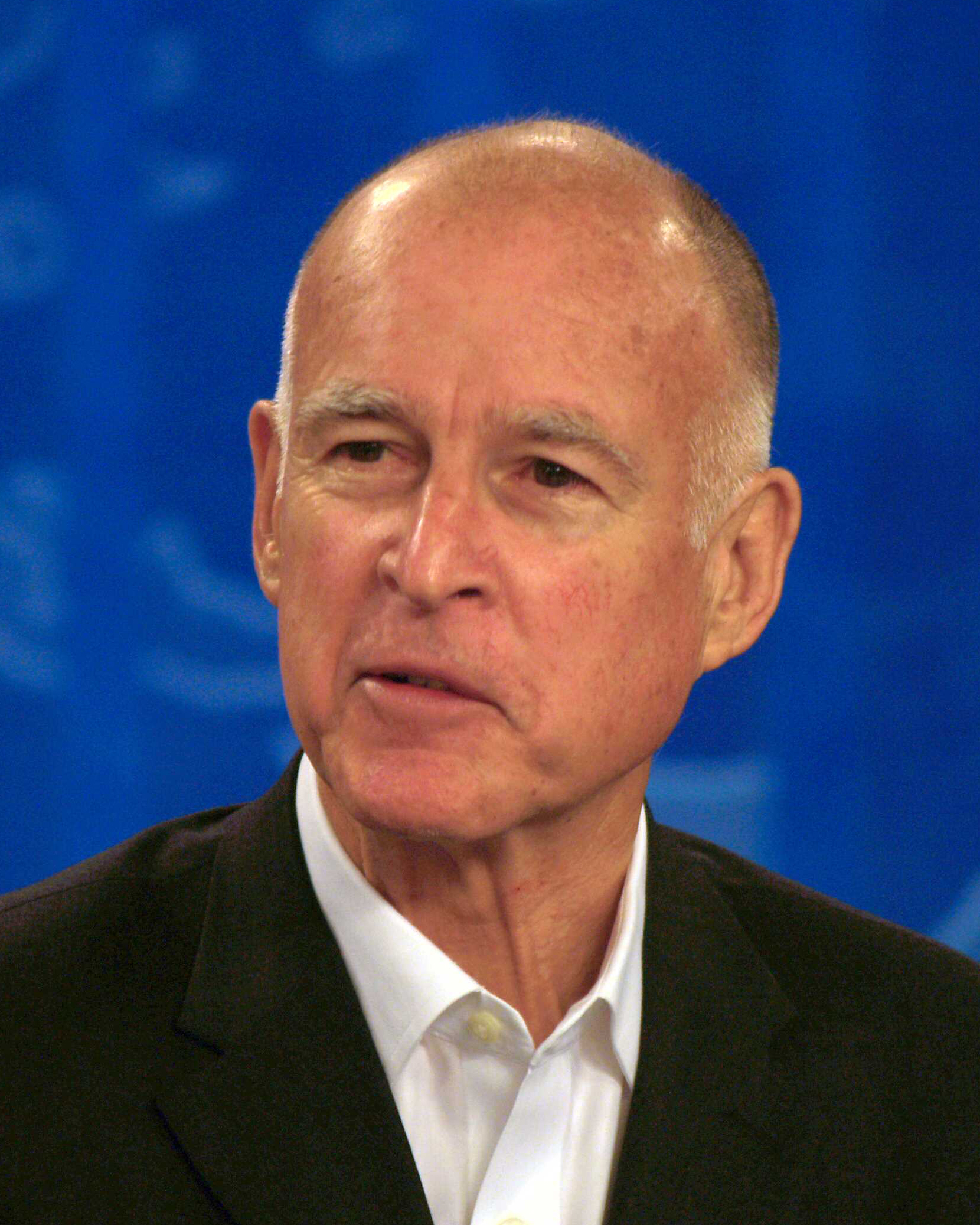
Brown as the attorney general in 2009

In 2004, Brown expressed interest in being a candidate for the Democratic nomination for attorney general of California in the 2006 election, and in May 2004, he formally filed to run. He defeated his Democratic primary opponent, Los Angeles City Attorney Rocky Delgadillo, 63% to 37%. In the general election, Brown defeated Republican State Senator Charles Poochigian 56.3% to 38.2%, one of the largest margins of victory in any statewide California race.

In the final weeks leading up to Election Day, Brown's eligibility to run for attorney general was challenged in what Brown called a "political stunt by a Republican office seeker" (Contra Costa County Republican Central Committee chairman and state GOP vice-chair candidate Tom Del Beccaro). Plaintiffs claimed Brown did not meet eligibility according to California Government Code §12503, "No person shall be eligible to the office of Attorney General unless he shall have been admitted to practice before the Supreme Court of the state for a period of at least five years immediately preceding his election or appointment to such office." Some legal analysts called the lawsuit frivolous because Brown was admitted to practice law in the State of California on June 14, 1965, and had been so admitted to practice ever since. Although ineligible to practice law because of his voluntary inactive status in the State Bar of California from January 1, 1997, to May 1, 2003, he was nevertheless still admitted to practice. Because of this distinction, the case was eventually thrown out.

=== Death penalty ===
As attorney general, Brown represented the state in fighting death-penalty appeals and stated that he would follow the law, regardless of his personal beliefs against capital punishment. Capital punishment by lethal injection was halted in California by federal Judge Jeremy D. Fogel until new facilities and procedures were put into place. Brown moved to resume capital punishment in 2010 with the execution of Albert Greenwood Brown after the lifting of a statewide moratorium by a California court. Brown's Democratic campaign, which pledged to "enforce the laws" of California, denied any connection between the case and the gubernatorial election. Prosecutor Rod Pacheco, who supported Republican opponent Meg Whitman, said that it would be unfair to accuse Brown of using the execution for political gain as they never discussed the case.

=== Mortgage fraud lawsuit ===
In June 2008, Brown filed a fraud lawsuit claiming mortgage lender Countrywide Financial had engaged in "unfair and deceptive" practices to get homeowners to apply for risky mortgages far beyond their means. Brown accused the lender of breaking the state's laws against false advertising and unfair business practices. The lawsuit also claimed the defendant misled many consumers by misinforming them about the workings of certain mortgages such as adjustable-rate mortgages, interest-only loans, low-documentation loans and home-equity loans while telling borrowers they would be able to refinance before the interest rate on their loans adjusted. The suit was settled in October 2008 after Bank of America acquired Countrywide. The settlement involved the modifying of troubled 'predatory loans' up to $8.4 billion.

=== Proposition 8 ===
Proposition 8, a contentious voter-approved amendment to the state constitution that banned same-sex marriage, was upheld in May 2009 by the California Supreme Court. In August 2010, the U.S. District Court for the Northern District of California ruled that Proposition 8 violated the Due Process and the Equal Protection clauses of the Fourteenth Amendment to the United States Constitution. Brown and then Republican Governor Arnold Schwarzenegger both declined to appeal the ruling. The state appeals court declined to order the governor or Attorney-General Brown to defend the proposition.

== 39th governor of California (2011–2019) ==
=== Third term ===
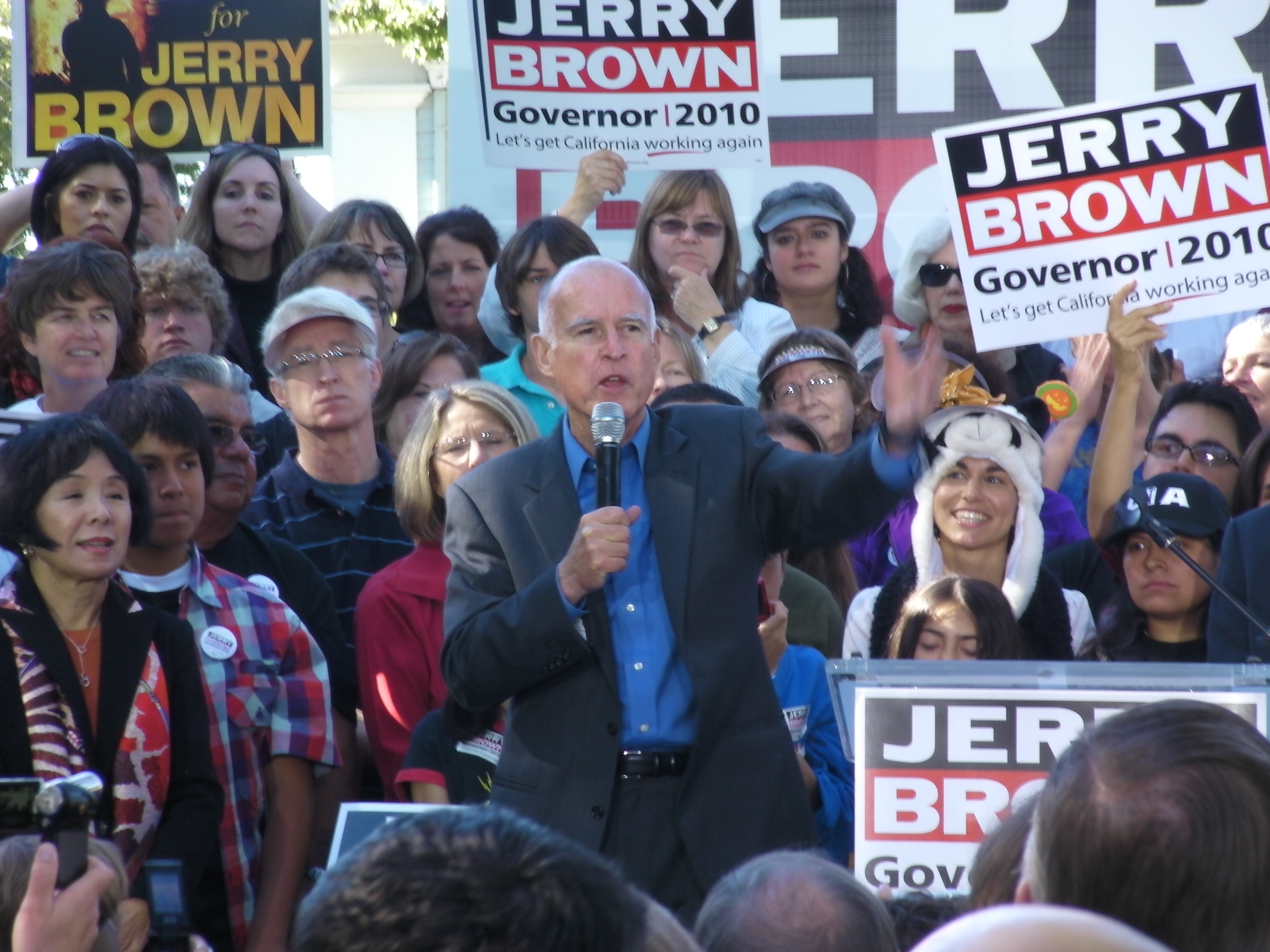
Brown at a campaign rally in Sacramento two days before the election in 2010

Brown announced his candidacy for governor on March 2, 2010. First indicating his interest in early 2008, he formed an exploratory committee in order to seek a third term as governor in 2010, following the expiration of Governor Arnold Schwarzenegger's term.

Brown's Republican opponent in the election was former eBay president Meg Whitman. Brown was endorsed by the Los Angeles Times, The Sacramento Bee, the San Francisco Chronicle, the San Jose Mercury News, and the Service Employees International Union.

Both Whitman and Brown were criticized for negative campaigning during the election. During their final debate at the 2010 Women's Conference a week before the election, moderator Matt Lauer asked both candidates to pull attack ads for the rest of the election, which elicited loud cheers from the audience. Brown agreed and picked one ad each of his and Whitman's that he thought, if Whitman would agree, should be the only ones run, but Whitman, who had been loudly cheered earlier as the prospective first woman governor of the state, was booed when she stated that she would keep "the ads that talk about where Gov. Brown stands on the issues".

The Los Angeles Times reported that nearly $250 million was spent on the Governor's race. At least two spending records were broken during the campaign. Whitman broke self-financing records by spending $140 million on the campaign from her personal finances, and independent expenditures exceeded $31.7 million, with almost $25 million of that spent in support of Brown. Despite being significantly outspent by Whitman, Brown won the gubernatorial race 53.8% to Whitman's 40.9%.

Brown was sworn in for his third term as governor on January 3, 2011, succeeding Republican Arnold Schwarzenegger who had been officially term-limited. Brown was working on a budget that would shift many government programs from the state to the local level, a reversal of trends from his first tenure as governor.

On June 28, 2012, Brown signed a budget that made deep cuts to social services with the assumption that voters would pass $8 billion in tax increases in November 2012 to close California's $15.7-billion budget deficit. Brown stated: "We need budget cuts. We need the continued growth of the economy for a long period of time. We're suffering from the mortgage meltdown that killed 600,000 jobs in the construction industry. ... We're recovering from a national recession slowly—over 300,000 jobs [gained] since the recession. We've got a million to go. That needs to continue, but that depends not only on Barack Obama and the Congress and the Federal Reserve, but also on [German chancellor Angela] Merkel, China, the European Union, and the self-organizing quality of the world economy."

In September 2012, Brown signed legislation sponsored by California state senator Ted Lieu that prohibits protesters at funerals within 300 feet, with convicted violators punishable with fines and jail time; the legislation was in response to protests conducted by the Westboro Baptist Church.

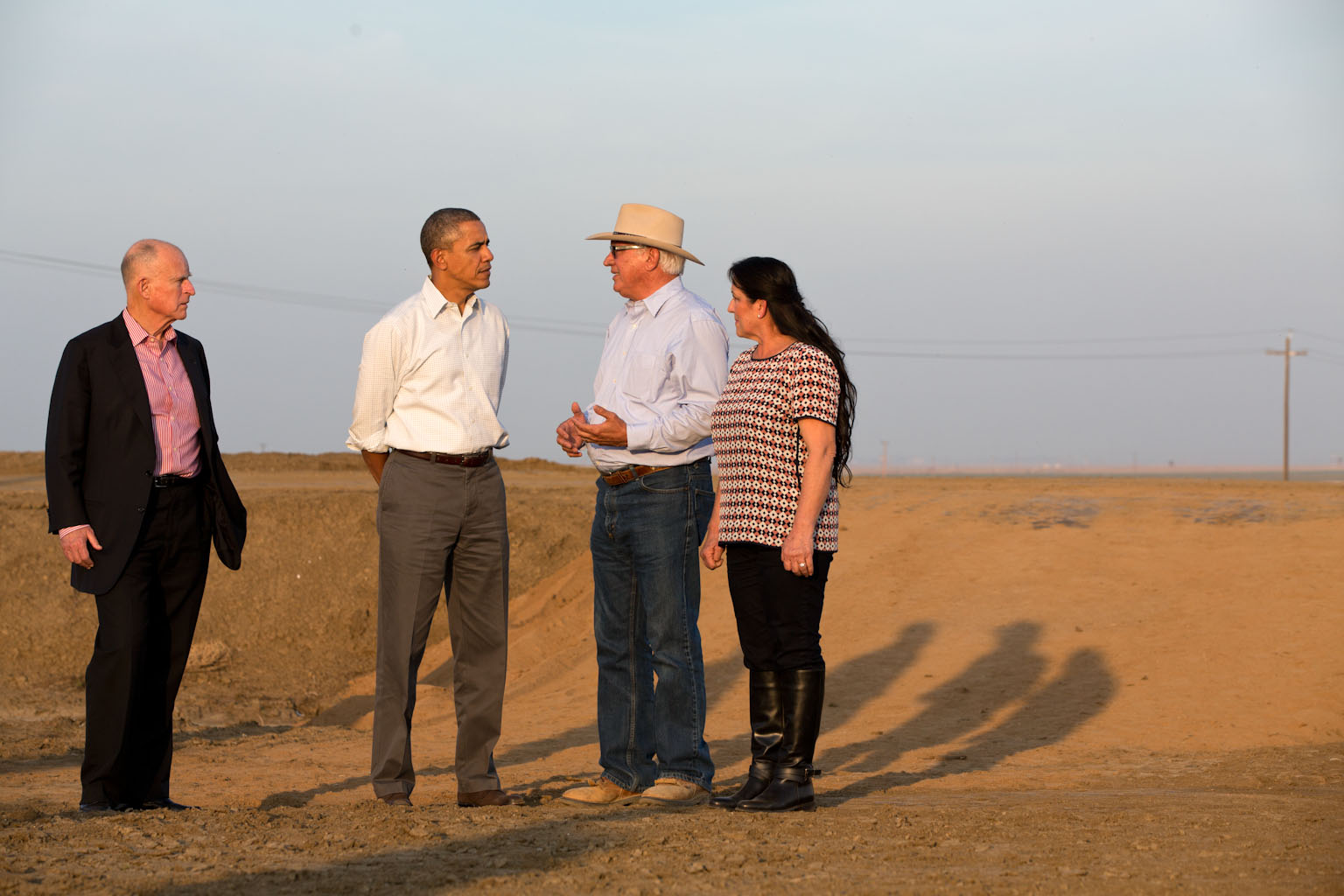
Brown and President Barack Obama discussing the drought in California with farmers, 2014

In the November 2012 general elections, voters approved Brown's proposed tax increases in the form of Proposition 30. Prop 30 raised the state personal income tax increase for seven years among California residents with an annual income over US$250,000 and increased in the state sales tax by 0.25 percent over four years. It allowed the state to avoid nearly $6 billion in cuts to public education.

In 2013, Brown proposed a large, $25 billion Bay Delta Conservation Plan (later renamed the California Water Fix and Eco Restore project) to build two large, four-story-tall, 30-mile-long (48 km) tunnels to carry fresh water from the Sacramento River under the Sacramento-San Joaquin Delta toward the intake stations for the State Water Project and the Central Valley Project. Unlike his earlier Peripheral Canal project, the two tunnels are to be funded by the agencies and users receiving benefit from the project and do not require voter approval.

In July 2014, Brown traveled to Mexico to meet with Mexican president Enrique Peña Nieto and Central American leaders about the ongoing children's immigration crisis.

On September 16, 2014, Gov. Brown signed a historic package of groundwater legislation. The plan will regulate local agencies and also implement management plans to achieve water sustainability within 20 years.

=== Fourth term ===
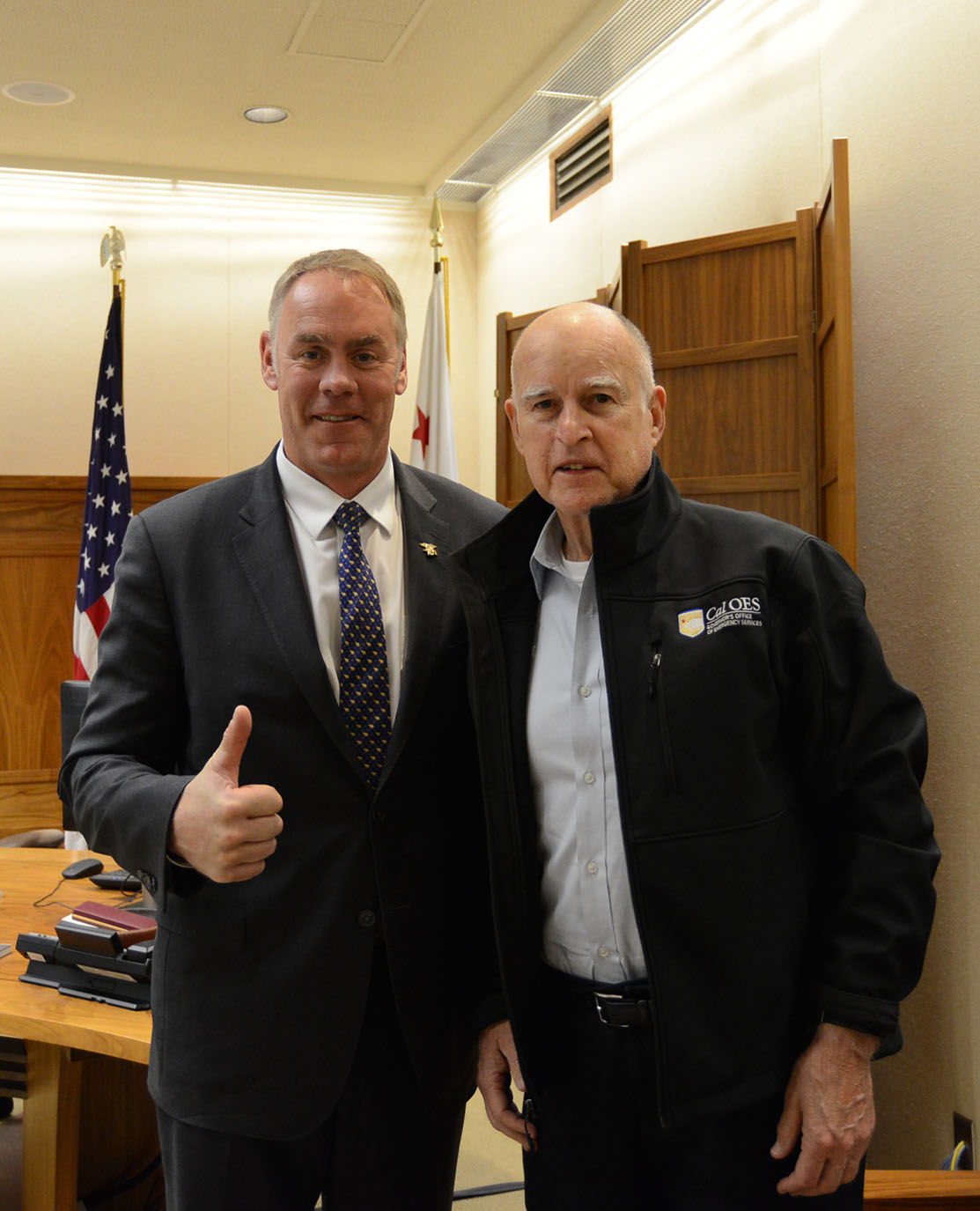
Brown meeting with U.S. Secretary of the Interior Ryan Zinke in April 2017

Brown announced his bid for another term on February 27, 2014. On June 3, he came in first place in the primary election by over 1.5 million votes. He received 54.3% of the vote and advanced to the general election with Republican Neel Kashkari, who took 19.38% of the vote.

There was only one gubernatorial debate. When asked to schedule another, Brown ultimately declined. During the debate in Sacramento on September 4, 2014, Kashkari accused Brown of failing to improve California's business climate. His leading example was the Tesla Motors factory investment, creating 6,500 manufacturing jobs, going to Nevada rather than California. Brown responded that the cash payment upfront required by the investment would have been unfair to California taxpayers. A range of issues were debated, including recent legislation for a ban on plastic bags at grocery stores that Brown promised to sign and Kashkari thought unimportant.

Brown said that if he were elected to a fourth and final term, he would continue transferring power to local authorities, particularly over education and criminal justice policy, and would resist fellow Democrats' "gold rush for new programs and spending".

In the general election, Brown was re-elected with 4,388,368 votes (60.0%) to Kashkari's 2,929,213. He was sworn in for a final term specifically on January 5, 2015. His stated goals for his unprecedented fourth term in office were to construct the California High-Speed Rail, to create tunnels to shore up the state's water system and to curb carbon dioxide emissions. He still had $20 million in campaign funds to advance his ballot measures in case the legislature didn't support his plans.

In October 2015, Brown signed off the California End of Life Option Act allowing residents of California who fulfilled strict criteria to exercise the right to die by accessing medical aid in dying. During the sign off he took the unusual step of adding a personal message indicating his dilemma regarding the consideration of the ethical issues involved and stating that he felt unable to deny the right of choice to others.

On December 18, 2015, Brown moved into the Historic Governor's Mansion, now part of Governor's Mansion State Historic Park.

In 2016, Brown vetoed a bill to exempt feminine hygiene products from state sales taxes, at the same time that he vetoed other bills which would also have exempted diapers, saying that collectively, these exemptions would have reduced state revenues by $300 million annually, and stated, "As I said last year, tax breaks are the same as new spending—they both cost the general fund money."

In the 2018–2019 budget plan that Brown released on January 10, 2018, the governor proposed spending $120 million to establish California's first fully online community college by fall 2019.

Legislative accomplishments in Brown's final term include passing California Sanctuary Law SB 54, which prevents police from complying with most requests by the U.S. Immigration and Customs Enforcement (ICE) to hold illegal immigrants for deportation; California Senate Bill 32, which requires the state to reduce greenhouse gas emissions to 40% below 1990 levels by 2030, extending the state's cap and trade system (which had originally been outlined by the Global Warming Solutions Act of 2006) to achieve this goal; and passing the Road Repair and Accountability Act. Brown has opposed the Proposition 6 ballot measure to repeal the Road Repair and Accountability Act, and endorsed Gavin Newsom to eventually succeed him.

Brown has been criticized for his links to the oil and gas industry, notably for contributions from, and his family ties to, Sempra Energy.

By September 2018, Brown had granted more than 1,100 pardons since returning to office in 2011; more pardons than any California governor in recent history. Brown commuted more than 82 sentences, the highest number since at least the 1940s.

== Post-public office ==
Following the conclusion of his career in public office, Brown has become increasingly involved with climate cooperation between United States non-state entities (including Michael Bloomberg and the Bloomberg Foundation) and China. Brown has also worked with former Chinese climate minister Xie Zhenhua to establish a new center for California-China climate cooperation at University of California, Berkeley.

Brown lives on a mountain ranch in California that he allows researchers including the California Native Plant Society to use as a meeting point. In 2023 a beetle in the genus Bembidium was named B. brownorum after Brown and his wife, after it was discovered on the ranch.

== Personal life ==
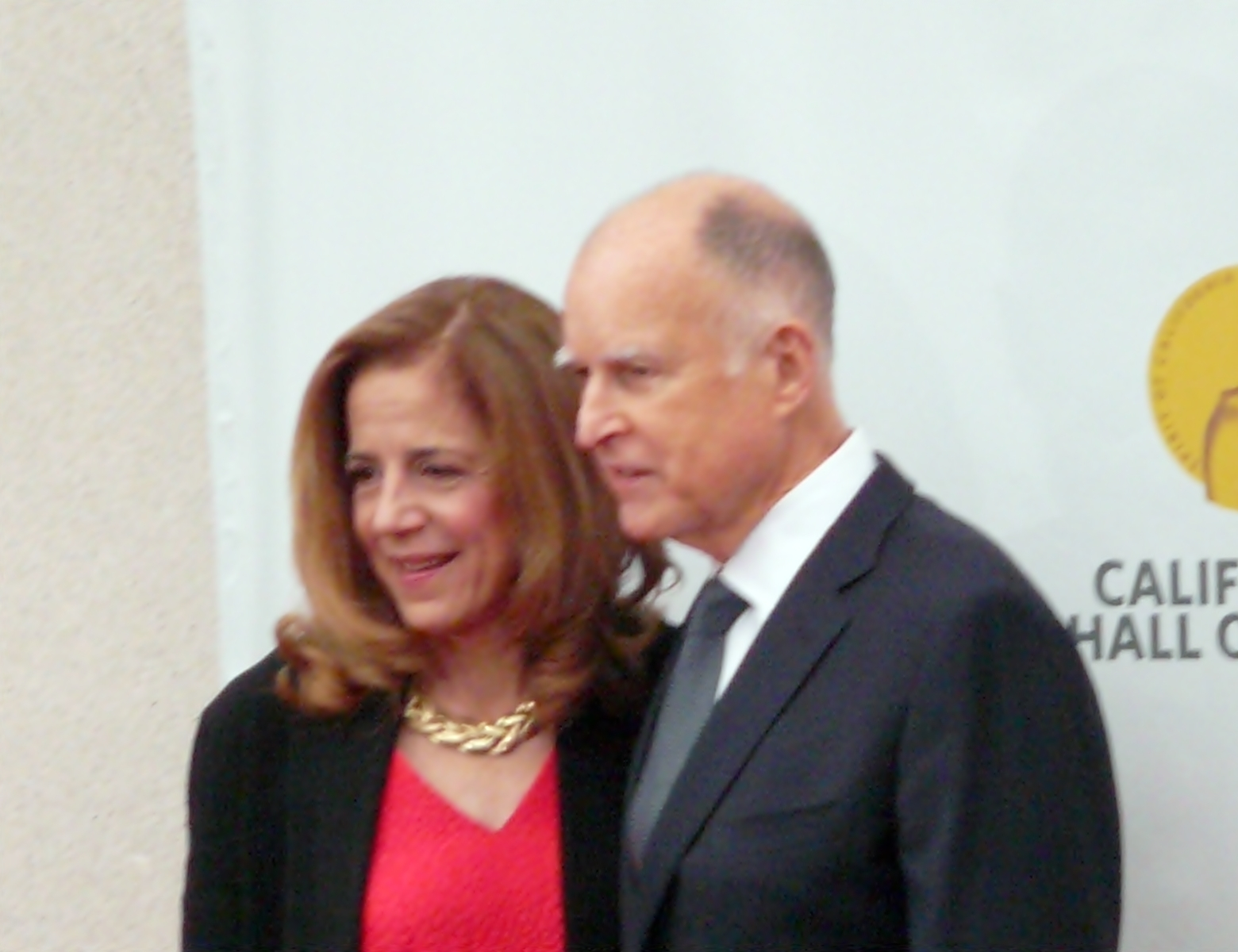
Brown and wife Anne Gust in 2013

A bachelor in his first two terms as governor and first term as mayor of Oakland, Brown attracted attention for dating famous women, the most notable of whom was singer Linda Ronstadt.

In March 2005, Brown announced his engagement to his girlfriend since 1990, Anne Gust, former chief administrative officer for the Gap. They were married on June 18, 2005, in a ceremony officiated by Senator Dianne Feinstein in the Rotunda Building in downtown Oakland. They had a second, religious ceremony later in the day in the Roman Catholic Church in San Francisco where Brown's parents had been married. Brown and Gust lived in the Oakland Hills in a home purchased for $1.8 million. As of 2019, they live on a ranch in Colusa County.

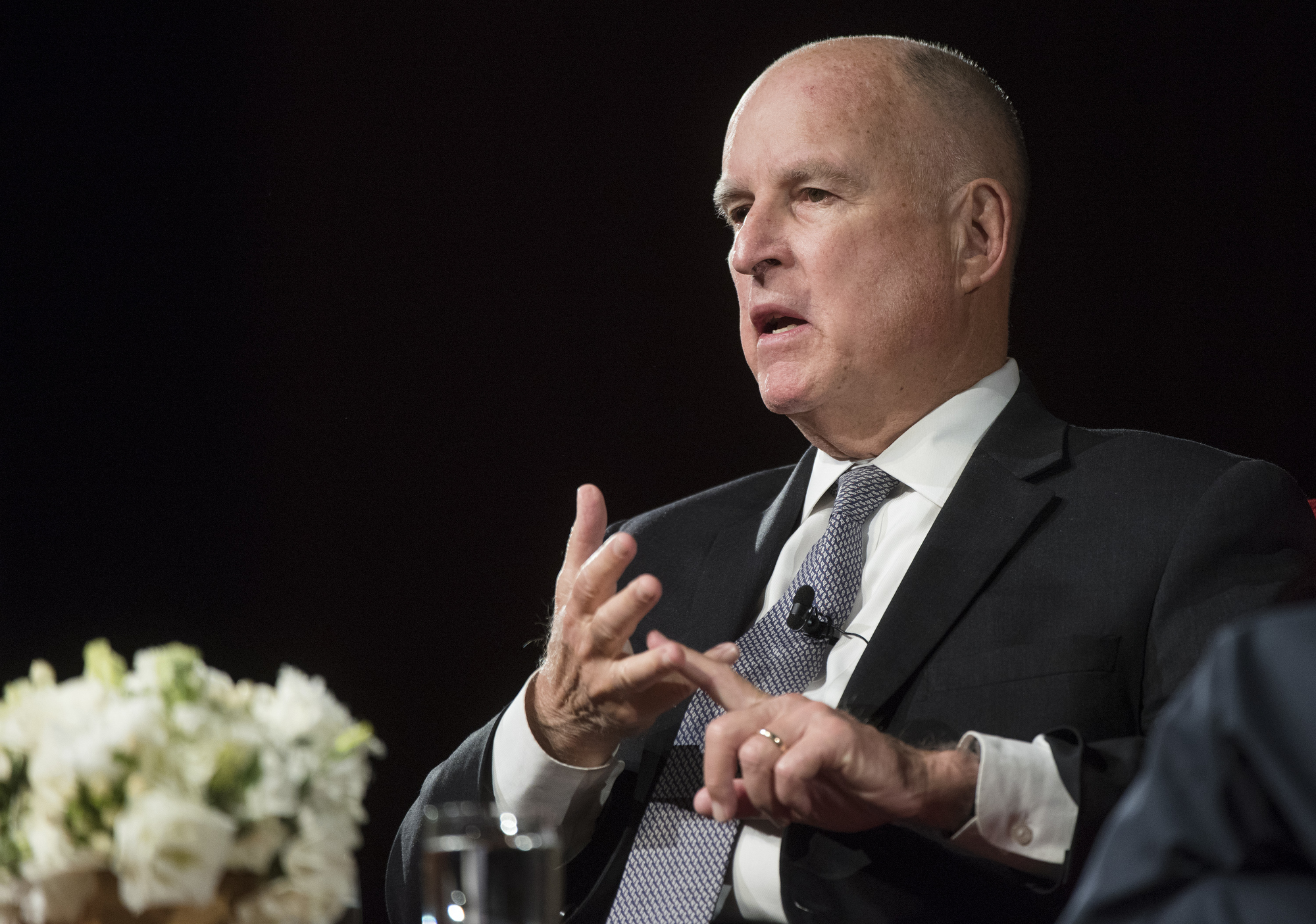
Brown at the LBJ Presidential Library in 2018

Beginning in 1995, Brown hosted a daily call-in talk show on the local Pacifica Radio station, KPFA-FM, in Berkeley broadcast to major U.S. markets. Both the radio program and Brown's political action organization, based in Oakland, were called We the People. His programs, usually featuring invited guests, generally explored alternative views on a wide range of social and political issues, from education and health care to spirituality and the death penalty.

The official gubernatorial portrait of Jerry Brown, commemorating his first period as Governor of California, was painted by Don Bachardy and unveiled in 1984. The painting has long been controversial due to its departure from the traditional norms of portraiture.

Brown had a long-term friendship with his aide Jacques Barzaghi, whom he met in the early 1970s and put on his payroll. Author Roger Rapaport wrote in his 1982 Brown biography California Dreaming: The Political Odyssey of Pat & Jerry Brown, "This combination clerk, chauffeur, fashion consultant, decorator, and trusted friend had no discernible powers. Yet, late at night, after everyone had gone home to their families and TV consoles, it was Jacques who lingered in the Secretary (of state's) office." Barzaghi and his sixth spouse Aisha lived with Brown in the warehouse in Jack London Square; Barzaghi was brought into Oakland city government upon Brown's election as mayor, where Barzaghi first acted as the mayor's armed bodyguard. Barzaghi left Brown's staff in July 2004, six days after police had responded to his residence over a complaint of domestic violence, and later moved to Morocco and then Normandy. Barzaghi died in 2021.

In April 2011, Brown had surgery to remove a basal-cell carcinoma from the right side of his nose. In December 2012, media outlets reported that Brown was being treated for early stage (the precise stage and grade was not stated) localized prostate cancer with a very good prognosis.

In 2011, Jerry and Anne Gust Brown acquired a Pembroke Welsh Corgi, Sutter Brown, dubbed the "first dog" of California. Sutter was frequently seen in the company of the governor, accompanying him to political events and softening the governor's cerebral image. In 2015, the couple obtained a second dog, Colusa "Lucy" Brown, a Pembroke Welsh Corgi/Border Collie mix. Sutter had emergency surgery in October 2016 to remove cancerous tissue. Sutter died in December 2016 from cancer at the age of 13.

In 2019, Brown was appointed to be a visiting professor at Berkeley.

Brown's accent has been described as reminiscent of the "Mission Brogue", particularly with his non-rhoticity.

Political offices
Preceded by H. P. Sullivan; Acting	Secretary of State of California; 1971–1975	Succeeded by March Fong
Preceded by Ronald Reagan	Governor of California; 1975–1983	Succeeded by George Deukmejian
Preceded by Elihu Harris	Mayor of Oakland; 1999–2007	Succeeded by Ron Dellums
Preceded by Arnold Schwarzenegger	Governor of California; 2011–2019	Succeeded by Gavin Newsom
Party political offices
Preceded by Jesse Unruh	Democratic nominee for Governor of California; 1974, 1978	Succeeded by Tom Bradley
Preceded by Brendan Byrne	Chair of the Democratic Governors Association; 1981–1982	Succeeded by John Y. Brown Jr.
Preceded by John Tunney	Democratic nominee for U.S. Senator from California (Class 1); 1982	Succeeded by Leo McCarthy
Preceded by Phil Angelides	Democratic nominee for Governor of California; 2010, 2014	Succeeded by Gavin Newsom
Legal offices
Preceded by Bill Lockyer	Attorney General of California; 2007–2011	Succeeded by Kamala Harris
U.S. order of precedence (ceremonial)
Preceded by Martha McSally as Former U.S. Senator	Order of precedence of the United States; Within California	Succeeded by Gray Davis as Former Governor
Preceded by Scott Walker as Former Governor	Order of precedence of the United States; Outside California	Succeeded by Gray Davis as Former Governor
