= 10.000 =

10.000 may represent either:

- The number 10000 (the point being a thousands separator, as common in many European countries)
- The number 10 known to five significant figures, i.e. 10±0.0005 (here the dot is a decimal separator, as commonly used in much of the English-speaking world)

== See also ==
- 10000 (disambiguation)
