= Kandi K12 =

Battery electric microcar

Overview
- Manufacturer: Kandi Technologies
- Production: 2016–2018
- Assembly: China: Jinhua

Body and chassis
- Class: Microcar
- Body style: 3-door hatchback
- Layout: Front-engine, front-wheel-drive layout

Dimensions
- Wheelbase: 1,880 mm (74.0 in)
- Length: 2,770 mm (109.1 in)
- Width: 1,560 mm (61.4 in)
- Height: 1,610 mm (63.4 in)
- Curb weight: 990 kg (2,183 lb)

The Kandi K12 is a battery electric microcar produced by the Chinese manufacturer Kandi Technologies.

== Overview ==
The K12 went on sale in 2016 as the smallest model in the offer, maintaining an avant-garde design distinguished by numerous, multi-shaped arches and a single body.

== Production ==
The K12 went on sale only on the Chinese market in May 2017, remaining there for the next 2 years and was discontinued without a successor in the first half of 2018.

== Specifications ==
The electrical system of the K12 has identical parameters compared to the larger K10 model. It is created by a battery with a capacity of 20 kWh, which, together with the electric motor, provides 47 hp and a range on a single charge of 153 kilometers.
