= 10,000 (disambiguation) =

10,000 is the natural number following 9,999 and preceding 10,001.

10000 may also refer to:

- 10,000 AD, the last year in the 10th millennium and 100th century, a century leap year starting on Saturday
- Myriad
- Ten Thousand, a group of Greek mercenary units
- LNER Class W1, a famous experimental steam locomotive in the UK
- British Rail Class D16/1, named LMS No. 10000 and 10001 were the first mainline diesel locomotives built in Great Britain
- Ten Thousand, 10,000ោ5000, or Dice 10,000, alternate names of a dice game called Farkle

== See also ==
- 10.000 (disambiguation)
- Orders of magnitude (numbers)
- Ten thousand years
- Myria-
