= 10K Plan =

Public policy plan in Oakland, California

The 10K Plan was an urban planning doctrine for Downtown Oakland to attract 10,000 new residents to the city's downtown and Jack London Square areas.

== History ==
As Oakland Mayor, Jerry Brown continued his predecessor Elihu Harris' public policy of supporting downtown housing development in the area defined as the Central Business District in Oakland's 1998 General Plan.

Brown believed that downtown area should attract people who leave it at the end of their workday.

Since Brown worked toward the stated goal of bringing an additional 10,000 residents to Downtown Oakland, his plan became known as "10K." It has resulted in redevelopment projects in the Jack London District, where Brown purchased and later sold an industrial warehouse which he used as a personal residence.

An Uptown Project, had been criticized in the press for diverting over $60 million in affordable housing to fund luxury housing units, built by Forest City Enterprises.

In 2010, The New York Times reported that the 10K plan was still incomplete nearly 4 years after Brown left Oakland. At the time of writing, the city completed just 3,549 units from projects approved during the Brown years.

In March 2014, Mayor Jean Quan announced her own 10K plan.

The 10K plan succeeded in building only 6,000 housing units, but many went unsold and projects were paused due to the 2008 financial crisis.
