= K10 transport/localisation element (TLS) =

- Predicted secondary structure and sequence conservation of K10_TLS

Identifiers
- Symbol: K10_TLS
- Rfam: RF00207

Other data
- RNA type: Cis-reg
- Domain(s): Eukaryota
- SO: SO:0005836
- PDB structures: PDBe

The K10 transport/localisation element (TLS) is a 44 nucleotide K10 TLS regulatory element from Drosophila melanogaster. K10 TLS is responsible for the transport and anterior localisation of K10 mRNA and acts to establish dorsoventral polarity in the oocyte. It was discovered by Julia Serano.
