= Kandi K10 =

Battery electric city car

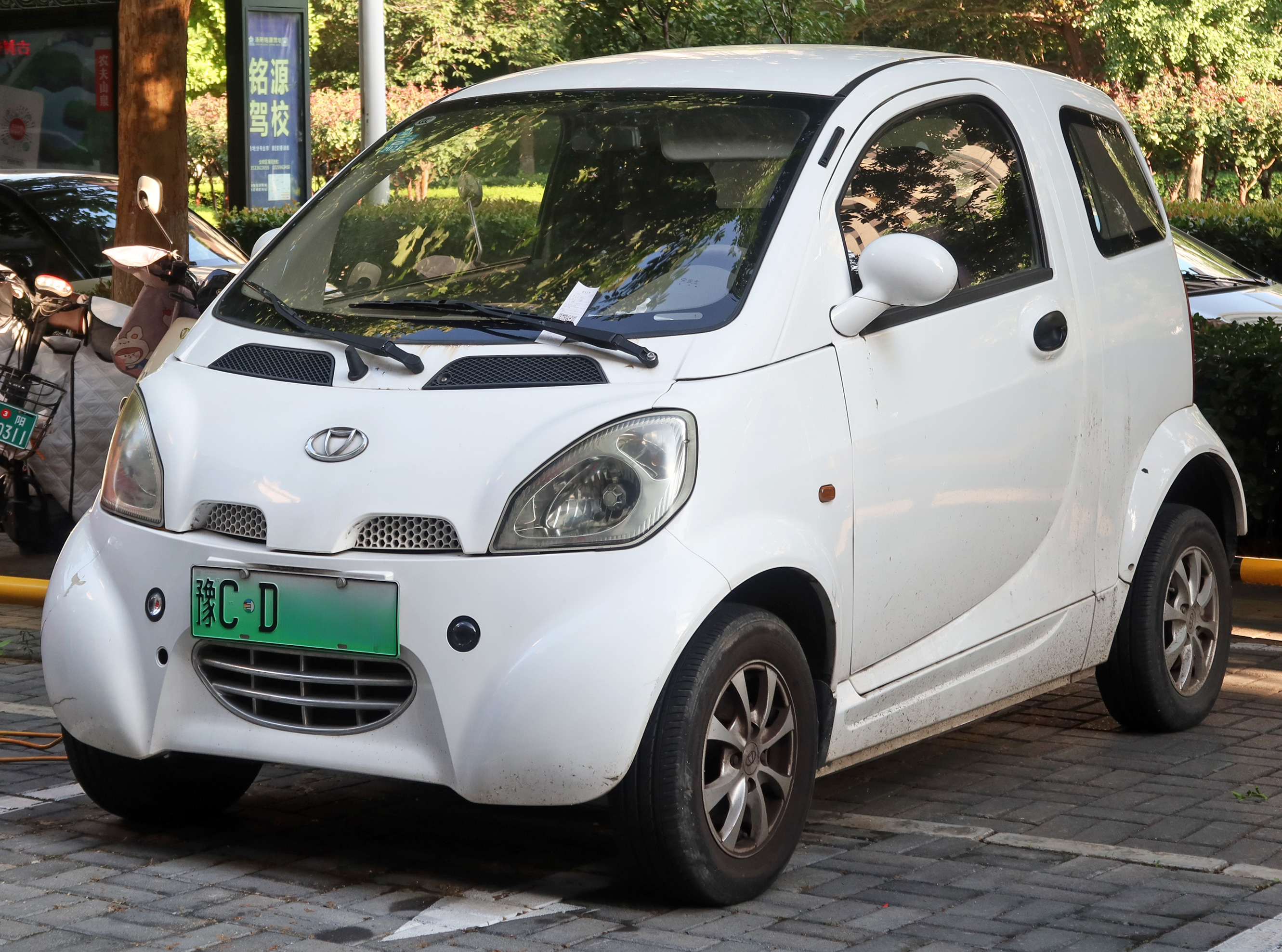

Overview
- Manufacturer: Kandi Technologies
- Production: 2015–2017
- Assembly: China: Jinhua

Body and chassis
- Class: City car (A)
- Body style: 3-door hatchback
- Layout: Front-engine, front-wheel-drive layout

Dimensions
- Wheelbase: 2,080 mm (81.9 in)
- Length: 2,900 mm (114.2 in)
- Width: 1,545 mm (60.8 in)
- Height: 1,590 mm (62.6 in)
- Curb weight: 970 kg (2,138 lb)

The Kandi K10 is a battery electric city car produced by the Chinese manufacturer Kandi Technologies.

== Overview ==
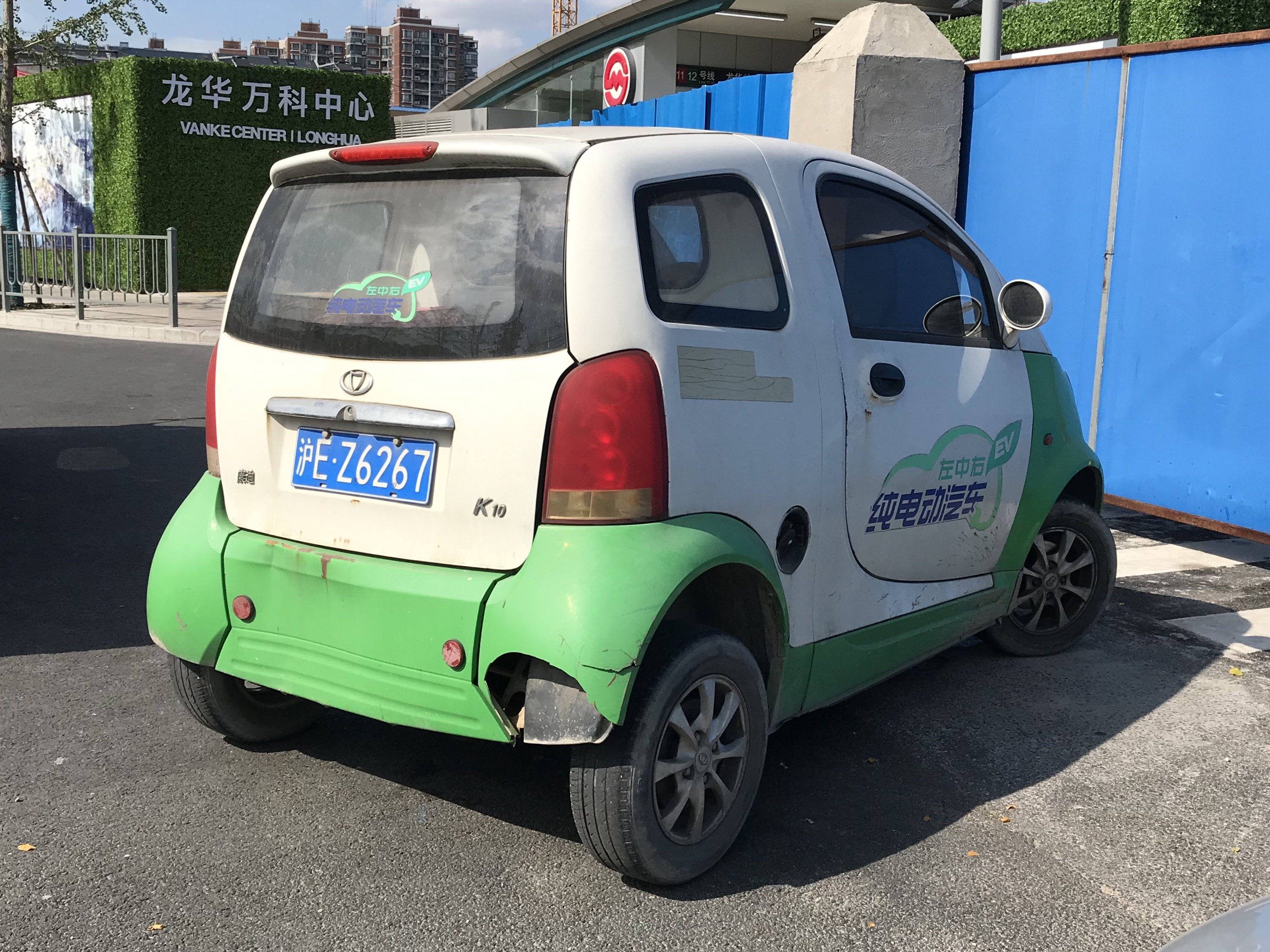
Rear view

The K10 appeared in the offer of the Chinese company Kandi in 2015, implementing the concept of a small, city electric vehicle built with the market in mind. The K10 took the form of a 3-door hatchback, gaining a two-tone painting of the body made of plastic.

In November 2015, the Kandi established cooperation with the Chinese startup Pang Da, delivering 1000 K10 units for the needs of city carsharing.

== Production ==
After 2 years of production and sale of the K10 on the Chinese market, the car was withdrawn from the market in 2017 in favor of newer designs and following the decision of the Chinese authorities to temporarily suspend Kandi Technologies due to allegations of unstable financial situation.

== Specifications ==
The electrical system of the K10 consists of a 20 kWh battery which provides 47 hp and a maximum range of 150 kilometers. Charging the battery to 100% takes about 10 hours.
