= Testarossa Winery =

Winery and tasting room in Los Gatos, California

Coordinates: 37.21346°N 121.98158°W

Testarossa is a winery and tasting room in Los Gatos, California. Testarossa makes multiple varietals and is known primarily for making Chardonnay and Pinot Noir wines.

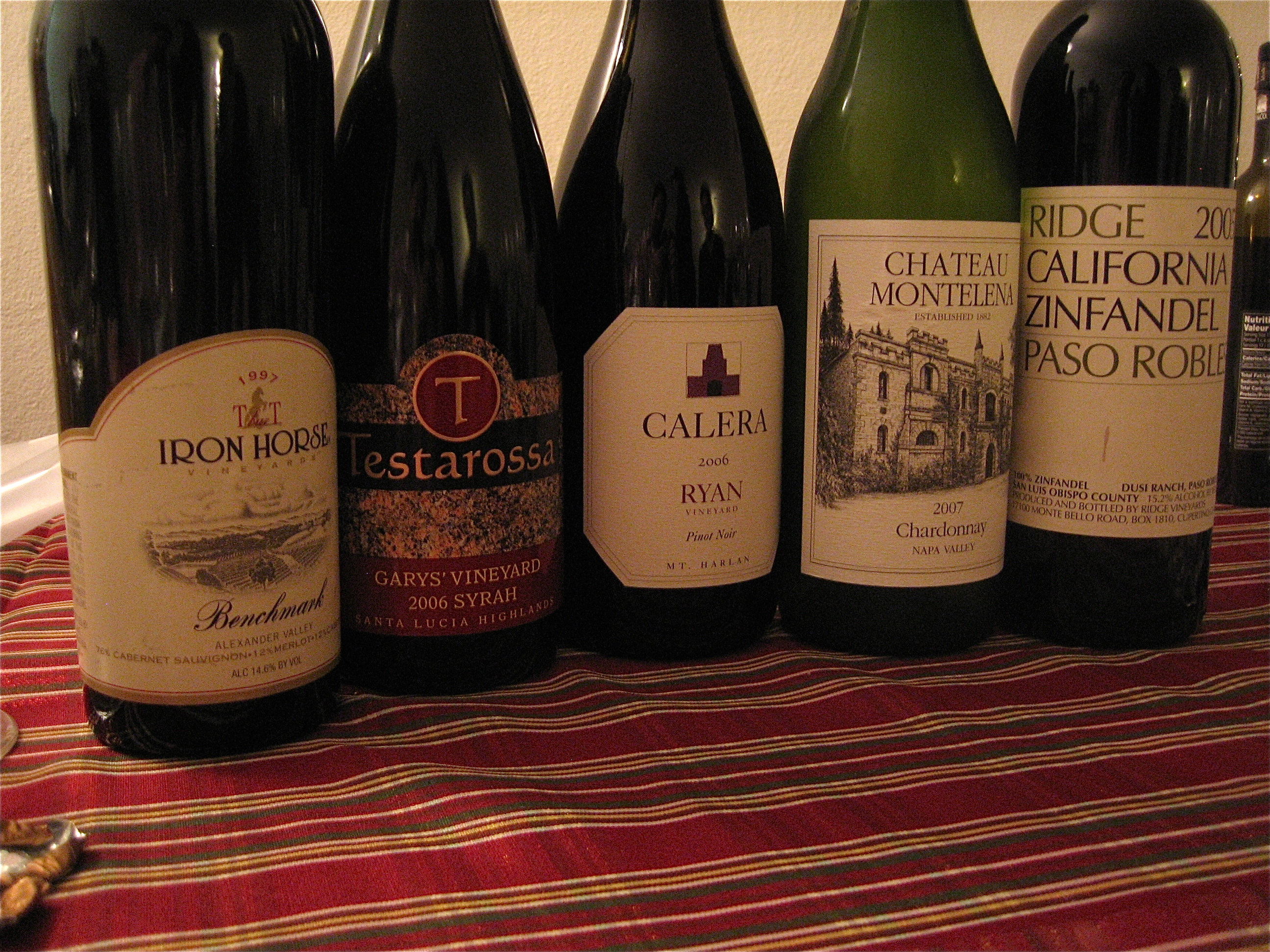
Testarossa Pinot Noir (pictured second from left)

== History ==
Testarossa was started by Rob and Diana Jensen in 1993. The name Testarossa is derived from Italian and means "red head," a reference to the nickname Rob Jensen was given when studying abroad in Italy in college while attending Santa Clara University. In 1997, the winery moved into the historic Sacred Heart Novitiate facility in Los Gatos and expanded to the entire winemaking facility in 2003. The production of altar wine during Prohibition means the Novitiate is the fourth-oldest continuously operating winery in California. Ed Kurtzman was the label's winemaker until Bill Brosseau took over in 2000.

== Wine profiles ==
=== Chardonnay ===
For the 2013 vintage, Testarossa produced 12 Chardonnay wines: Chalone, Santa Lucia Highlands, Cuvee Los Gatos, Diana's Chardonnay, Dos Rubios, Fogstone, La Rinconada, Lone Oak, Rincon, Rosella's, Sierra Madre, and Soberanes. Many of them received ratings of 90 or higher from the Wine Enthusiast Magazine. The vintage had a high yield despite the drought conditions in California, producing grapes at a similar level to 2012.

=== Pinot Noir ===
For the 2013 vintage, Testarossa produced 19 Pinot Noir wines: Russian River Valley, Santa Lucia Highlands, Cuvee Los Gatos, Cuvee Niclaire, Brosseau, Doctor's, Dos Rubios, Fogstone, Graham Family, Guidotti, La Encantada, La Rinconada, Pisoni, Rincon, Rosella's, Sanford & Benedict, Sierra Madre, Soberanes, and Tondre Grapefield.

=== Other varietals ===
For the 2013 vintage, Testarossa also produced a Pinot Noir Rose, a Syrah, and a Late Harvest Syrah.

== Vineyard partners ==
Testarossa has vineyard partners from multiple American Viticultural Areas (AVAs) in California; primarily, the Russian River Valley AVA, Chalone AVA, Santa Lucia Highlands AVA, Arroyo Grande Valley AVA, Santa Maria Valley AVA, and the Sta. Rita Hills AVA.

Vineyard	AVA	First Vintage produced by Testarossa	Varietal(s)
Brosseau	Chalone	2002	Chardonnay, Pinot Noir
Doctor's	Santa Lucia Highlands	2008	Pinot Noir
Dos Rubios	Santa Lucia Highlands	2010	Chardonnay, Pinot Noir
Fogstone	Santa Lucia Highlands	2010	Chardonnay, Pinot Noir
Garys'	Santa Lucia Highlands	1999	Pinot Noir, Syrah (discontinued)
Graham Family	Russian River Valley	2004	Pinot Noir
Guidotti	Santa Lucia Highlands	2011	Pinot Noir
La Encantada	Sta. Rita Hills	2011	Pinot Noir
La Rinconada	Sta. Rita Hills	2012	Chardonnay, Pinot Noir
Lone Oak	Santa Lucia Highlands	2010	Chardonnay
Pisoni	Santa Lucia Highlands	1997	Pinot Noir
Rincon	Arroyo Grande Valley	2010 (Chardonnay), 2012 (Pinot Noir)	Chardonnay, Pinot Noir
Rosella's	Santa Lucia Highlands	2001	Pinot Noir
Sanford & Benedict	Sta. Rita Hills	2004	Chardonnay, Pinot Noir
Soberanes	Santa Lucia Highlands	2011	Chardonnay, Pinot Noir
Tondre Grapefield	Santa Lucia Highlands	2012	Pinot Noir

== News, scores and reviews ==
Testarossa is among the top 10 rated wineries in the San Jose area and remain one of the oldest operating ones as well. The Silicon Valley Business Journal noted the winery's location as one of the reasons it's been so successful with events, noting its close proximity to Apple's Cupertino location and Cisco's San Jose location.

Dave Meniketti of the musical group Y&T recently started producing his own label, Meniketti Wines, with Testarossa and together have made a Chardonnay and Pinot Noir released in summer of 2015.

Testarossa wines have been reviewed by the Wine Enthusiast, Wine Spectator, and Robert Parker. The Wine Enthusiast named Testarossa one of the vital Pinot Noir producers of the Santa Lucia Highlands region and have given them many 90-point scores over the course of the winery's history. Both the Wine Spectator and Robert Parker have given scores of 90 or higher to multiple of Testarossa's wines.

== Sacred Heart Novitiate ==
The facility Testarossa uses was originally created by Jesuits from Santa Clara College. The Sacred Heart Novitiate produced wine from 1888 to 1986, most notably creating a Black Muscat dessert wine that won gold medals multiple times at the California State Fair. It primarily served as a training center for Jesuit novices who would then later go to Santa Clara College (now Santa Clara University).

"We loved it. It was eight hours of hard manual labor every day. Some of us were city boys — we mowed the lawn, you helped your dad build a fence — but I'd never done that. … They put our whole class, all 25 guys, in the back of the truck, wearing our denim, and drove up into the fields … We'd pick the grapes. It's where we got to know each other. The first hour you'd pick the grapes in silence, while you prayed. … They'd blow a whistle and then you could talk the rest of the day. We took our lunch there, sitting on the vines with views of the Bay Area."

— Jesuit Bishop Michael Barber,

The Novitiates purchased 40 acres (16 ha) of ranch land from Harvey Wilcox in 1886 and used it to grow wine as well as a variety of different fruits and vegetables. As of 2015, the Novitiate primarily serves as a retirement center for Jesuits and the Sacred Heart Jesuit Retirement Center houses over 75 Jesuits.
