= Virus (disambiguation) =

A virus is a submicroscopic infectious agent that replicates only inside the living cells of an organism.

Virus or The Virus may also refer to:

- Computer virus, a type of malicious computer program
  - Mobile virus, a type of malicious cell phone program

== Brands and enterprises ==
- Virus (automobile), a French cyclecar
- Virus (clothing), an Israeli clothing brand
- Access Virus, a line of virtual analog synthesizers by German company Access Music
- Virus Buster Serge, a Japanese media franchise also known as Virus

== Comics ==
- Virus (comics), a Dark Horse miniseries
- Virus (Spirou et Fantasio), an album of the Spirou et Fantasio comics series

== Fictional entities ==
- Viruses, the main enemies from Dr. Mario
- Viruses, the main enemies in the Mega Man Battle Network series
- Virus, a sniper unit from Command & Conquer: Yuri's Revenge
- Viral, an artificial intelligence in Teenage Mutant Ninja Turtles

== Film and television ==
- Virus (1980 film) or Fukkatsu no hi, a Japanese post-apocalyptic film by Kinji Fukasaku
- Virus - l'inferno dei morti viventi or Hell of the Living Dead, a 1980 Italian zombie film
- Virus (1995 film), a film based on the novel Outbreak by Robin Cook
- Virus (1999 film), a science fiction-horror film by John Bruno
- Virus (2019 film), a Malayalam-language Indian film directed by Aashiq Abu
- The Virus (TV series), a South Korean TV series
- Virus (2016 film), an Uzbek drama film
- Virus (2025 film), a South Korean romantic comedy-drama film by Kang Yi-kwan

== Literature ==
- Virus (novel), a 1964 science fiction novel by Sakyo Komatsu
- Viruses (journal), a scientific journal published by MDPI
- The Virus (novel), a 2015 thriller about a pandemic by Stanley Johnson

== Music ==
=== Artists ===
- Virus (Argentine band), a new wave band formed in 1981
- Virus (Norwegian band), an avant-garde metal band 2000–2018
- Virus (Russian band), a band formed in 1999
- The Virus (band), an American punk band formed in 1998
- Sulfur (band), originally Virus, an American rock band 1991–1998
- Virus, a 1995 alias used by Paul Oakenfold
- Virus, a German band that participated in a 1971 Ken Hensley side project

=== Albums ===
- Virus (Dado Polumenta album) or the title song, 2011
- Virus (Haken album), 2020
- Virus (Heavenly album) or the title song, 2006
- Virus (Hypocrisy album), 2005
- Virus (Slank album) or the title song, 2001
- The Virus (album), by Brotha Lynch Hung, 2001
- Virus, by Big Boy, 2000
- Virus, by Excision, 2016

=== Songs ===
- "Virus" (Björk song), 2011
- "Virus" (Front Line Assembly song), 1991
- "Virus" (Iron Maiden song), 1996
- "Virus" (KMFDM song), 1989
- "Virus" (LaFee song), 2006
- "Virus (How About Now)", by Martin Garrix and MOTi, 2014
- "Virus", by Avail from Dixie, 1994
- "Virus", by Deltron 3030 from Deltron 3030, 2000
- "Virus", by Lagwagon from Resolve, 2005
- "Virus", by Pitchshifter from Infotainment?, 1996

== People ==
- Virus (musician) or Andre Michel Karkos, lead guitarist of Device
- Virus (wrestler) or Ricardo Amezquita Cardeño (born 1968), professional wrestler

== Video games ==
- Virus, a prototype version of the NES game Dr. Mario
- Virus (1988 video game), a port of the 1987 computer game Zarch
- Virus (1997 video game), a video game by Hudson Soft
- Virus: The Game, a 1997 computer game by Sir-Tech
- Virus: It Is Aware, a 1999 video game by Cryo

== Other uses ==
- Radio SRF Virus, a Swiss German-language radio station

== See also ==
- List of viruses
- Viral (disambiguation)
