= Chuck Pfarrer =

American writer and U.S. Navy SEAL (born 1957)

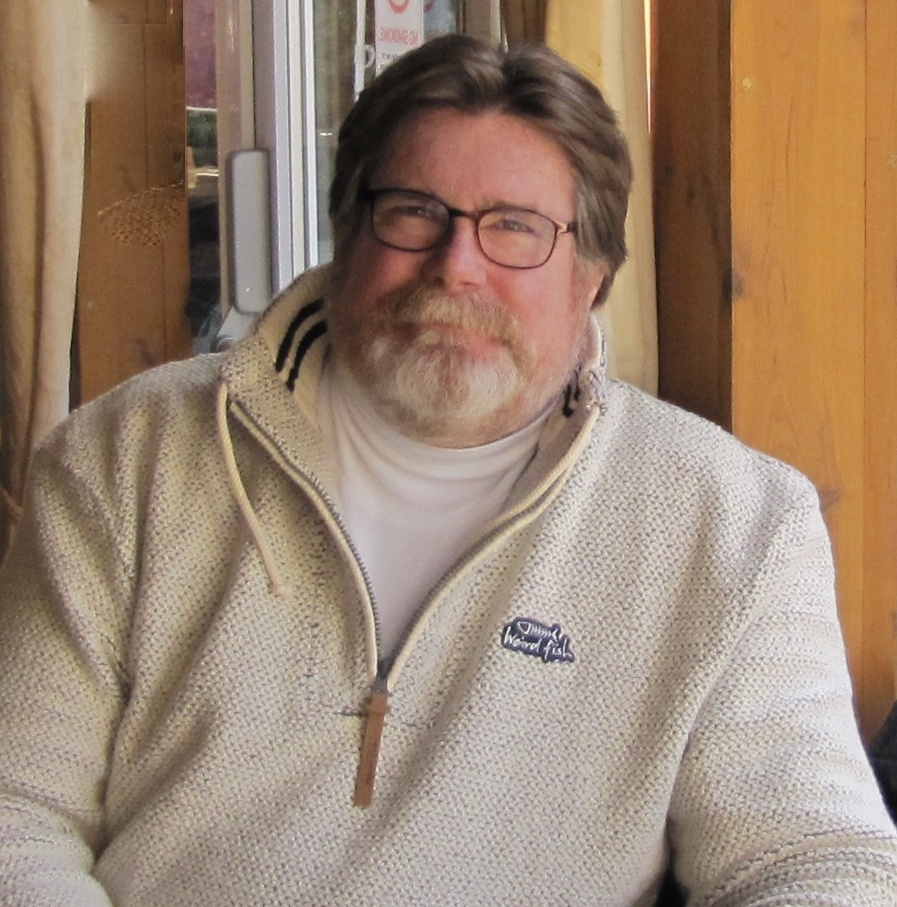
- Pfarrer in 2011
- Born: Charles Patrick Pfarrer III; April 13, 1957 (age 69); Boston, Massachusetts, U.S.
- Education: California State University, Northridge; University of Bath
- Occupations: Writer, film producer, actor
- Military career
- Allegiance: United States
- Branch: United States Navy
- Service years: 1980–86
- Rank: Lieutenant
- Units: SEALs; SEAL Team Four; SEAL Team Six

Charles Patrick Pfarrer III (born April 13, 1957) is an American writer, film producer, and former U.S. Navy SEAL. As an author, he has penned published screenplays, novels, comic books, and non-fiction works. His notable film credits include Navy SEALs (1990), Darkman (1990), Hard Target (1993), and Virus (1999).

== Early life and education ==
Pfarrer was born April 13, 1957, in Boston, Massachusetts, the son of Charles Patrick Pfarrer, Jr., a career naval officer, and Joan Marie Pfarrer, a registered nurse.

He graduated from Staunton Military Academy in 1975, and studied Clinical Psychology at California State University, Northridge and the University of Bath in England.

== Military career ==
Pfarrer entered active duty with the United States Navy in October 1980 and completed Officer Candidate School in Newport, R.I in 1981. After his commission as an ensign in the U.S. Navy, he reported to Basic Underwater Demolition/SEAL training (BUD/S) at Naval Amphibious Base Coronado. After six months of training, Pfarrer graduated with BUD/S class 114 in September 1981. Following SEAL Tactical Training (STT) and completion of six month probationary period, he received the 1130 designator as a Naval Special Warfare Officer, entitled to wear the Special Warfare insignia and spent the next five years as a Navy SEAL. His initial assignment was to Underwater Demolition Team TWENTY ONE (UDT-21) at Naval Amphibious Base Little Creek, Virginia.

Pfarrer deployed numerous times as a military advisor in Central America, trained NATO forces in Europe and the Mediterranean, and completed a combat deployment in 1983 to Beirut during the Lebanese Civil War when UDT-21 was redesignated as SEAL Team FOUR. As SEAL Assistant Platoon commander assigned to the Multi-National Peacekeeping Force, he witnessed the 1983 Marine barracks bombing in Beirut. In September 1984, Pfarrer reported to SEAL Team SIX in Training Support Center Hampton Roads to begin an eight-month specialized selection and training course to become a counterterrorist operator. Pfarrer ended his naval service in June 1986 as Assault Element Commander at the United States Naval Special Warfare Development Group (DEVGRU).

=== Military awards and decorations ===
U.S. military decorations
Navy and Marine Corps Achievement Medal
Combat Action Ribbon
Joint Meritorious Unit Award
Armed Forces Expeditionary Medal
Navy Unit Commendation
Navy Expeditionary Medal
Navy Sea Service Deployment Ribbon
Navy and Marine Corps Overseas Service Ribbon
Navy Rifle Marksmanship Badge
Navy Pistol Marksmanship Badge

U.S. badges, patches and tabs
Naval Special Warfare insignia
Navy and Marine Corps Parachutist Insignia
Army Parachutist Badge
Military Freefall Parachutist Badge

== Writing career ==
=== Screenwriter ===
While still in the Navy, Pfarrer sold a spec script that he wrote in college. His film credits include writing, acting and production work in Navy SEALs, Darkman, Barb Wire and Hard Target. Pfarrer's other screenwriting credits include The Jackal, Virus and Red Planet. He became a member of the Western branch of the Writers Guild of America.

He is an uncredited writer on the films Sudden Impact and Arlington Road, and wrote early drafts for Shooter and The Green Hornet. He is the author and creator of six graphic novels for Dark Horse Comics, and wrote and produced two interactive full motion videos, Flash Traffic and Silent Steel, both for Tsunami Media.

Pfarrer's screenplay, Crash Site, was in development as a feature film by ALCON media. It was to be directed by Academy Award-winning director Charlie Gibson and produced by John Bladecchhi and Alcon co-chiefs Broderick Johnson and Andrew Kosove.

=== Fiction ===
His first published novel, Killing Che, was released in 2007.

Pfarrer's second novel, a work of nautical fiction, was published by the United States Naval Institute Press in April 2016. Based on the epic American short story of the same name by Edward Everett Hale, Philip Nolan, The Man Without a Country is a novelization of Hale's story, and tells of Nolan's court martial and his life as a prisoner on an American ship.

=== Non-fiction ===
Pfarrer was active in the 2004 effort to recall Writers Guild of America president Charles Holland, who had falsely claimed to be a wounded combat veteran, intelligence officer and Green Beret. Holland later resigned.

Pfarrer's best-selling autobiography, Warrior Soul, The Memoir of a Navy SEAL, was published in 2003.

Pfarrer is the author of the 2011 book SEAL Target Geronimo: The Inside Story of the Mission to Kill Osama bin Laden, a New York Times best-seller, which was controversial because he gave a different account of the raid than had the government.

He has written op-eds for The New York Times and the Knight Ridder syndicate. He has appeared as an author and counter-terrorism expert on CSPAN-2, NPR, the Arabic network Al Hurra, IPR, Voice of America, Fox News, ABC, America Tonight and The Australian Broadcast Company.

== Filmography ==
=== Film ===
Year	Title	Writer	Producer	Actor	Director	Role	Notes
1990	Navy SEALs	Yes	Co-producer	Yes	Lewis Teague	Aircraft Carrier Officer	with Gary Goldman
1990	Darkman	Yes	No	No	Sam Raimi	—N/a	with Sam Raimi, Ivan Raimi, Joshua Goldin and Daniel Goldin
1993	Hard Target	Yes	No	Yes	John Woo	Douglas Binder	
1996	Barb Wire	Yes	No	No	David Hogan	—N/a	with Ilene Chaiken
1997	The Jackal	Yes	No	No	Michael Caton-Jones	—N/a	
1999	Virus	Yes	Executive	No	John Bruno	—N/a	with Dennis Feldman
2000	Red Planet	Yes	Executive	No	Antony Hoffman	—N/a	with Jonathan Lemkin

==== Uncredited writing contributions ====
- Arlington Road (1999)
- Second Nature (2003)
- Shooter (2007) - Early draft
- The Green Hornet (2011) - Early draft

=== Video games ===
Year	Title	Publisher	Platform
1994	Flash Traffic: City of Angels	Tsunami Games	MS-DOS
1995	Silent Steel	Tsunami Games	Microsoft Windows

== Bibliography ==
=== Fiction ===
Year	Title	Publisher
2007	Killing Che	Random House
2016	Philip Nolan: The Man Without a Country	U.S. Naval Institute

=== Non-fiction ===
Year	Title	Publisher
2004	Warrior Soul: The Memoir of a Navy SEAL	Presidio Press
2011	SEAL Target Geronimo: The Inside Story of the Mission to Kill Osama bin Laden	St. Martin's Press

=== Comic books ===
Year	Title	Publisher
1992	Virus	Dark Horse Comics
1992	The Thing from Another World	Dark Horse Comics
