= Police Quest II: The Vengeance =

1988 video game

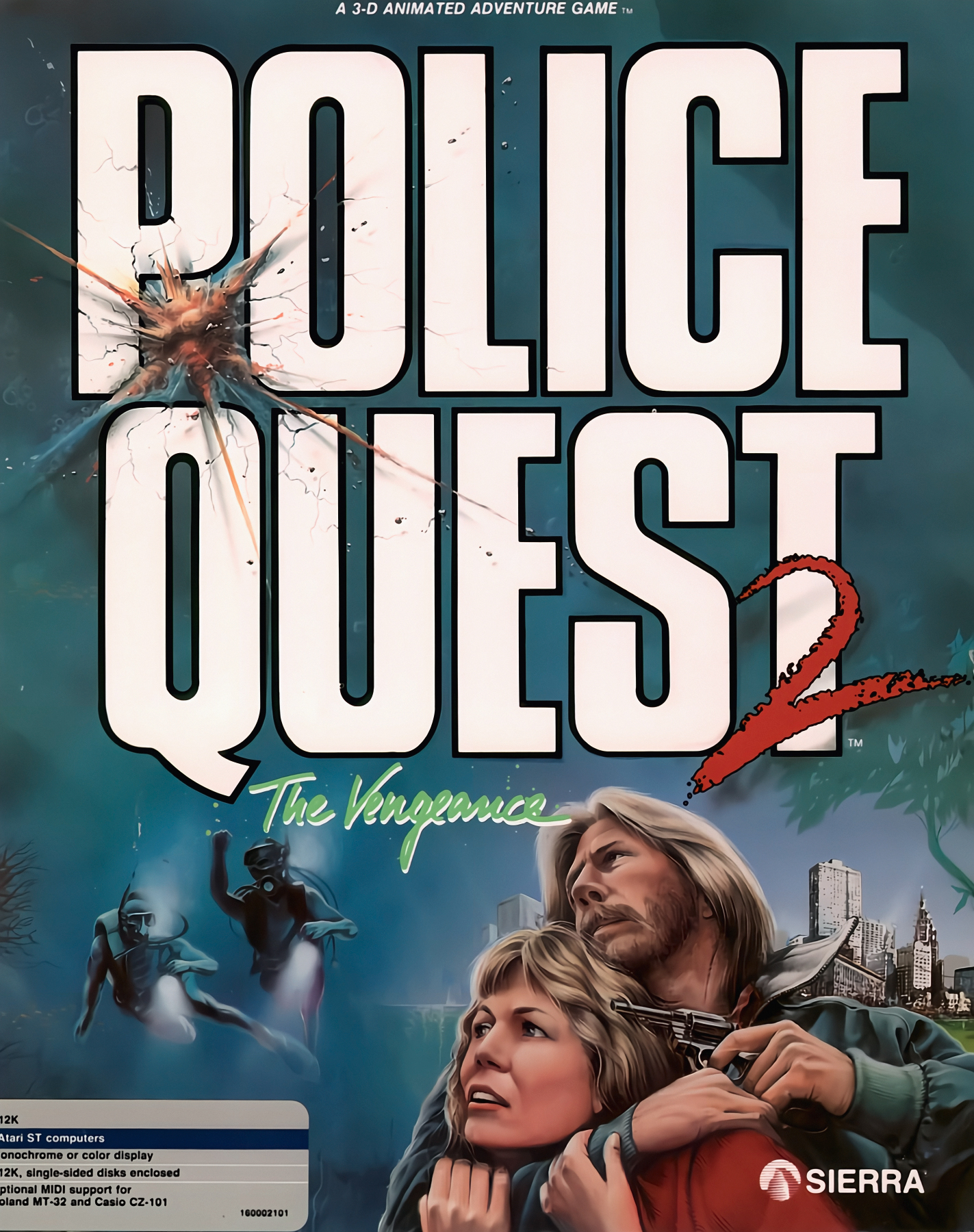
- Developer: Sierra On-Line
- Publisher: Sierra On-Line
- Producer: Ken Williams
- Designer: Jim Walls
- Programmers: Robert Fischbach; Robert Eric Heitman; Chris Hoyt; Mickie Lee; Jerry Shaw; David Slayback
- Artists: Cheryl Loyd; Vu Nguyen
- Writer: Jim Walls
- Composer: Mark Seibert
- Series: Police Quest
- Engine: SCI
- Platforms: MS-DOS; Amiga; Atari ST; NEC PC-9801
- Release: November 1988
- Genre: Adventure game
- Mode: Single-player

Police Quest II: The Vengeance (also known as Police Quest II) is a 1988 police procedural adventure video game developed and published by Jim Walls and Sierra On-Line. It is the second installment in the Police Quest series. The game continues the story of police officer Sonny Bonds as he attempts to apprehend an escaped convict.

Police Quest II was well-received by critics and sold moderately well. A sequel, Police Quest III: The Kindred, was released in 1991.

== Gameplay ==
A text parser interface is used to control the player character in Police Quest II. Commands are given in a verb/noun combination (e.g., "Unlock Door" or "Take Keys"), though some keyboard shortcuts are available. The player is required to follow correct police procedures to effectively complete the game and achieve the highest score.

Unlike the first game, driving sequences between destinations are automatic, accomplished through the parser interface (i.e., "drive station" or "chase car") and the player is not required to control the car directly.

Sonny Bonds has access to a firearm. The player is required to use the gun at times throughout the game and will need to make sure the gun is sighted properly as well as loaded with ammunition. There are no action sequences in the game as such, though some hazardous situations are time critical. So long as Sonny is properly positioned (facing his target) and his pistol is sighted, he will fire as accurately as the plot demands.

== Plot ==
In 1989, in the city of Lytton, California, Detective Sonny Bonds of the Lytton Police Department is assigned to escort Jessie Bains, a drug lord he apprehended years prior, to a retrial. In his personal life, Bonds has been reassigned to the Homicide Division, and he has begun dating Marie Wilkans, a former prostitute who helped him apprehend Bains. However, while being held in Lytton's jail, Bains takes a prison guard hostage with a shiv and manages to escape with the guard.

Bonds and his partner Keith Robinson gather evidence at the jail and locate the kidnapped guard's car. Responding to a reported sighting of Bains near the riverside, Bonds and Bains briefly exchange fire before the latter escapes. Bonds dives into the river to search for evidence and finds the guard's body. Bonds concludes that Bains has assumed the guard's identity, but still cannot determine his next move. Bonds goes off-duty and has a dinner date with Marie, where they discuss the investigation.

The Oak Tree Mall location

The next day, police discover the body of Woody Roberts, a former Hotel Delphoria bartender and a witness in Bains' trial. Evidence at the site leads Bonds and Robinson to a motel, where they and a SWAT team raid Bains' room; though Bains is not present, Bonds finds the business card of former drug dealer Donald Colby, along with a tube of Marie's lipstick under the bed. Hurrying to Marie's house, Bonds finds Marie has been abducted by Bains, who has left a hit list naming those who Bains intends to take revenge on, including Bonds, Marie, Roberts, and Colby, the latter of whom is now in witness protection and has moved to the town of Steelton. (Note: The exact location of Steelton is left ambiguous, and the series contradicts itself when describing its location, though it is evidently far enough from Lytton to require a flight. The 1992 remake of Police Quest I places Steelton in California, while the Police Quest Casebook states it is in New Mexico.) Bonds and the Lytton PD deduce that Bains has traveled to Steelton to kill Colby, and that Bains is using Marie as bait to ambush Bonds.

Alerting Colby and the Steelton Police Department to Bains' plans, Bonds and his partner board a flight to Steelton, managing to avert a terrorist hijacking along the way. In Steelton, Bonds learns that Bains has already shot Colby, but the Steelton PD manages to trace the source of a phone call to Colby's office to a local park, and Bonds heads there to investigate. Bonds tracks Bains into the sewer system below the park and chases him through the sewers, rescuing Marie and killing Bains in a shootout after he finds them.

Bonds is placed on a mandatory three-day administrative leave while Lytton PD Internal Affairs investigates his actions. The investigators determine that Bonds acted in self-defense, and he is decorated by the department. Bonds takes off for The Bahamas with Marie and proposes to her on the flight.

== Development ==
The 1988 sequel, developed with Sierra's new SCI engine, focused more on detective and forensics work than the traffic-cop beginning of the original, while keeping the same realistic setting. The proper procedures for collecting and handling evidence are the main focus of many of the puzzles in Police Quest II. It was released for the IBM PC, Amiga, Atari ST, and later for the NEC PC-9801 (using redrawn sprites in an anime-esque style to appeal to the Japanese market).

The scenarios present in the game are based on situations designer Jim Walls or his friends were in while in the California Highway Patrol. The antagonist Jessie Bains is based on a real escaped convict who was on the loose at the time the game was released.

== Reception ==
The first four Police Quest games totaled 850,000 sales by late 1995. However, Markus Krichel of PC Games noted that "interest on the part of the gamer fell slightly" with Police Quest: Open Season, which led Sierra On-Line to experiment with a new direction for the series with Police Quest: SWAT. According to Sierra, combined sales of the Police Quest series—including SWAT—surpassed 1.2 million units by the end of March 1996.

In its June 1989 issue, British magazine Atari ST User called the ST version "excellent in every respect – the graphics, plot, detail, humour and story telling are of first rate quality", awarding it 9 out of 10. Computer Gaming World also gave the game a glowing review, saying, "The advanced graphics, intriguing story, and flowing animation make this story come alive. The whole package leads us toward a new apex in interactive game fiction!"

Retro-gaming websites Hardcore Gaming 101 and Adventure Gaming both praised the title, calling it the highlight of the series, with Hardcore Gaming 101 stating that "if there's any one title (of the Police Quest series) that deserves attention, it's this one. It's well-paced, fairly exciting, and more interesting than any of the others, and something of an overlooked classic." Adventure Gamers concluded similarly that "(t)he Vengeance is an entertaining and intense retro adventure that is not only the best of its series, but one of the very best of Sierra's Golden Age." In 2011, Adventure Gamers named Police Quest II the 24th-best adventure game ever released.

== Reviews ==
A French review praised the game's authentic portrayal of American police procedures, noting its detailed implementation of police protocols, including penal codes, radio communication procedures, and investigative methods. The reviewer appreciated the game's atmosphere, comparing it favorably to popular police television series like Hill Street Blues and Kojak, and commended its realistic approach to law enforcement simulation, though noted the language barrier as a potential obstacle for non-English speaking players.
