= Quest IV =

Quest 4 or Quest IV may refer to:

- Dragon Quest IV, a role-playing video game
- King's Quest IV, fourth installment in the King's Quest series of graphic adventure games
- Police Quest: Open Season (also known as Police Quest IV), a 1993 police procedural point-and-click adventure video game
- Space Quest IV, a 1991 graphic adventure game
