= Going Viral =

Going Viral, Goes Viral, Go Viral, Gone Viral, or variant, may refer to:

- Viral phenomenon, a pop cultural phenomenon
- Going Viral (2019 documentary), company documentary to the 2019 mini-series The Hot Zone
- Going Viral (2013 book) by Karine Nahon
- Going Viral: Zombies, Viruses, and the End of the World (2018 book) by Dahlia Schweitzer
- "Going Viral" (2014 TV episode) season 2 episode 5 of The Face, see The Face (U.S. season 2)
- "Going Viral", Part 1 and Part 2 (2012 TV episodes) a pair of season 2 episodes of Body of Proof, see Body of Proof (season 2)
- Going Viral (dance) a performance dance created by Nathan Andary and Jane Wang
- Gone Viral TV, Barbadian TV channel

== See also ==
- Viral (disambiguation)
