= Police Quest: In Pursuit of the Death Angel =

1987 video game

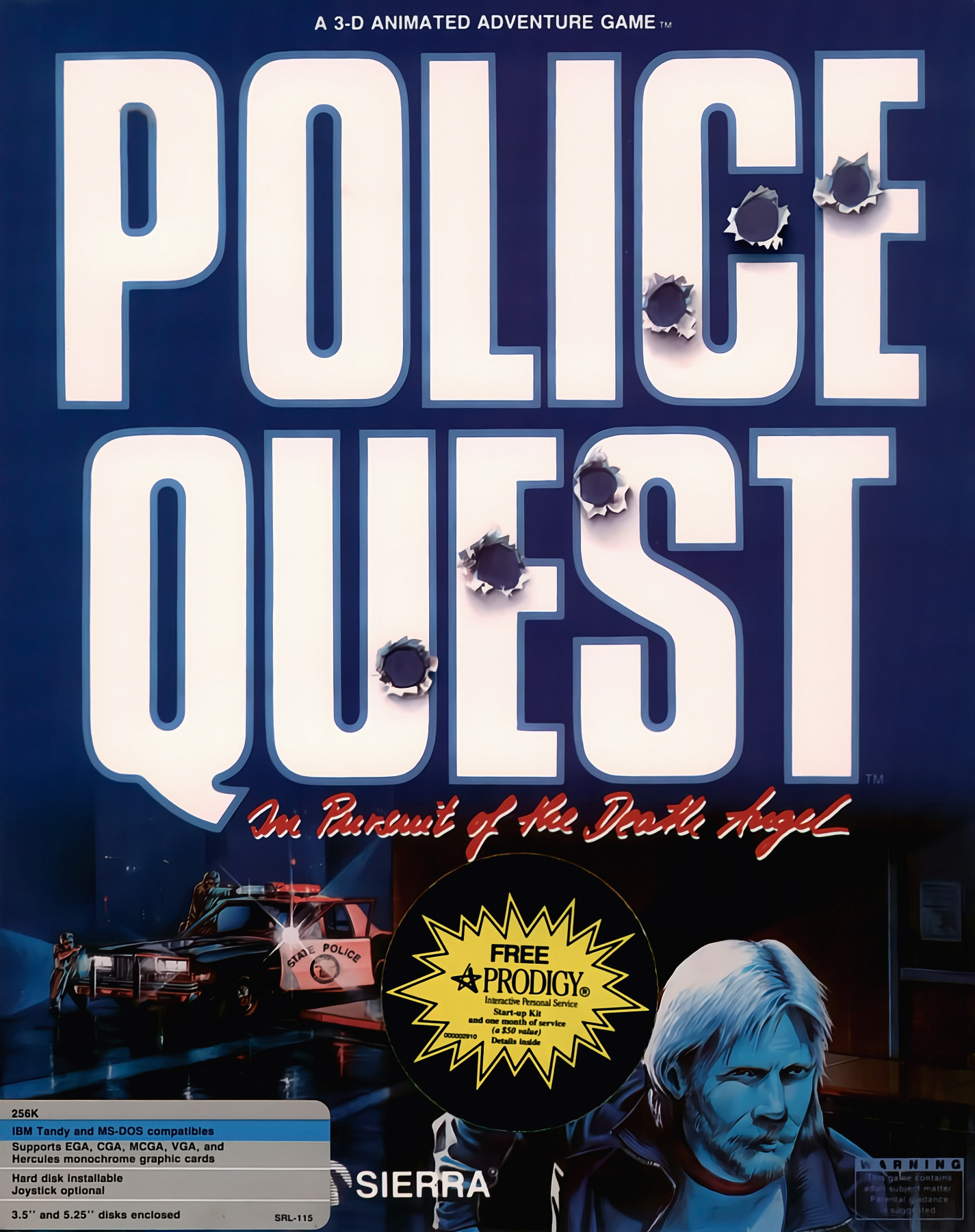
- Cover art for the 1987 version
- Developer: Sierra On-Line
- Publisher: Sierra On-Line
- Designer: Jim Walls
- Programmers: Al Lowe; Greg Rowland; Ken Williams; Scott Murphy
- Artists: Mark Crowe; Gerald Moore
- Writer: Jim Walls
- Composer: Margaret Lowe
- Series: Police Quest
- Engine: AGI / SCI1.1 (Remake)
- Platforms: Amiga; Atari ST; Apple II; Apple IIGS; MS-DOS; Mac
- Release: November 1987 (AGI); 1992 (SCI)
- Genres: Adventure, simulation
- Mode: Single-player

Police Quest: In Pursuit of the Death Angel (also known as Police Quest I or simply Police Quest) is a 1987 police procedural adventure video game developed and published by Jim Walls and Sierra On-Line. Police Quest follows police officer Sonny Bonds as he investigates a drug cartel in the town of Lytton, California.

First released in 1987 as a command-line interface game built on Sierra's AGI, Police Quest was remade in 1992 using 256-color VGA graphics and the SCI engine and used point-and-click gameplay. Designed to effectively be a police simulator, Police Quest features relatively simple puzzles, but relies strongly on strict adherence to proper police procedure, as detailed in the game's manual.

Police Quest was a moderate critical and commercial success, spawning the successful Police Quest series, which later evolved into the SWAT series of shooter games. A direct sequel, Police Quest II: The Vengeance, was released in 1988.

== Gameplay ==
The player is required to follow proper police procedures (Atari ST screenshot).

Police Quest: In Pursuit of The Death Angel is an adventure game in which gameplay is centered on interacting with the environment to resolve a series of scenarios. These largely revolve around typical police work, such as securing crime scenes and recovering stolen vehicles, while following proper duty procedures. The original release of the game required the player to type in the desired actions, such as opening doors, pressing buttons, or firing one's gun. In contrast, the remake allows the player to use the mouse to select actions from a menu and interact with objects in the environment.

The game is the most realistic of those developed by Sierra in the late 1980s (when compared to Leisure Suit Larry, King's Quest, or Space Quest). The lack of "traditional" puzzles made the game stand out at the time of release. Unlike many games of this genre, the style of play depends mainly on a strict adherence to standard police policy and procedure. Proper policy must be followed and individual actions must be performed in order (e.g., Sonny must draw and aim his sidearm before firing, or he will shoot himself in the leg). Failure to abide by proper procedure typically leads to the player being penalized points or having Sonny killed; for example, if Sonny does not store his sidearm in a gun locker while processing a suspect at the jail, the suspect will immediately steal it and shoot him, resulting in a game over.

== Plot ==
In the mid-1980s (early 1990s in the remake), the city of Lytton, California, experiences a rise in crime, most prominently drug abuse. Officer Sonny Bonds of the Lytton Police Department is assigned to traffic duty by his supervisor, Sergeant Dooley, and is told to look out for a stolen black Cadillac (Mercedes-Benz in the remake).

During his patrol, Bonds responds to a single-vehicle accident and finds the driver of the crashed car, drug dealer Lonny West, dead of a gunshot wound to the head. Bonds hands over the investigation to Sergeant Dooley and returns to patrol, ticketing a speeding motorist, handling a situation involving bikers who are troubling a bar, and arresting a drunk driver. At the bar, Sonny encounters "Sweet Cheeks" Marie Wilkans, a prostitute who was once his high school crush, who supplies him with information on a violent drug ring infiltrating the city. After his shift ends, Bonds visits The Blue Room, a café frequented by off-duty police officers, where he talks with Officer Jack Cobb about Cobb's daughter Kathy, who is addicted to drugs. The next day, Bonds locates the stolen Cadillac/Mercedes-Benz (now painted light blue) and, with help from Cobb, arrests the driver, Marvin Hoffman. Bonds finds drugs in the trunk of the car and a .45 Smith & Wesson handgun on Hoffman, linking him to West's murder.

Due to his work on the case, Bonds is promoted to detective, assigned to the Narcotics Division, and partnered with Detective Laura Watts. Investigating Lytton's drug epidemic, Bonds uncovers that Hoffman is actually Jason Taselli, a drug dealer on the FBI's Most Wanted List, which scores him a no-bail warrant from the city judge. Later, Bonds and Watts arrest Kathy's dealer, Donald Colby, during a stakeout, but Bonds learns from Cobb that Kathy has fallen into an overdose-induced coma with little chance of recovery. He also learns Taselli has escaped from jail, but patrol officers later find his body in the river. Bonds identifies the cause of the drug crisis as Jessie Bains (Jesse Bains in the remake), nicknamed "The Death Angel", a drug lord who is involved in an illegal gambling operation at the Hotel Delphoria. Learning that Kathy has died, Bonds silently vows to bring Bains to justice.

Bonds goes undercover to infiltrate the gambling ring at the Hotel Delphoria, enlisting the assistance of Marie. He is taken to a card game with Frank Magpie and his friends, where he manages to gain their trust. Bonds is invited to Magpie's penthouse suite, where he reveals himself to be Jesse Bains. Summoned by a phone call, Bains leaves the room and Sonny calls the Narcotics Division for backup. Returning, Bains has discovered Bonds' true identity, but before he can kill him, a backup team arrives and shoots Bains. Bains survives and is arrested, tried, and convicted of multiple crimes for a 97-year prison sentence, while Bonds is awarded the Key to the City for his work and falls in love with Marie.

== Development ==
Before Police Quest's conception, Sierra president Ken Williams wanted to develop a police adventure game, preferably with an actual police officer serving as a technical advisor, overseeing the game's design to ensure authenticity and realism. In 1985, Williams met California Highway Patrol (CHP) officer Jim Walls, who was on administrative leave to treat trauma he had received from a shooting a year prior. Following Walls' retirement from the CHP in 1986, Williams befriended Walls and asked if he could write a short story about his experiences in the CHP; this short story eventually developed into Police Quest's plot.

Development commenced after Walls' story grew enough to be partitioned into a design document and game components for development. The game's designers were Williams, Walls, Roberta Williams, Mark Crowe, Scott Murphy, and Al Lowe. At the time, Walls was unfamiliar with computers, so the other Sierra developers assisted him until he could develop on his own. The game's protagonist, Sonny Bonds, was loosely based on Walls' son (also named Sonny), and many incidents in the game were based on actual incidents encountered by Walls during his time in the CHP.

Police Quest was released for the IBM PC, Apple II (128K), Amiga, Atari ST, and Apple IIGS. An SCI 1.1 enhanced version in 256-color VGA was released in 1992.

Between October 25 and October 27, 2022, digital historian and archivist Jason Scott uploaded the source code of Police Quest to GitHub as a means of video game preservation. Several other Sierra games were preserved by Scott in that period, including Donald Duck's Playground, The Black Cauldron, King's Quest III, Leisure Suit Larry in the Land of the Lounge Lizards (and its VGA remake), Leisure Suit Larry Goes Looking for Love (in Several Wrong Places), Leisure Suit Larry III: Passionate Patti in Pursuit of the Pulsating Pectorals, and Leisure Suit Larry 5: Passionate Patti Does a Little Undercover Work.

== Reception ==
The first four Police Quest games totaled 850,000 sales by late 1995. However, Markus Krichel of PC Games noted that "interest on the part of the gamer fell slightly" with Police Quest: Open Season, which led Sierra On-Line to experiment with a new direction for the series with Police Quest: SWAT. According to Sierra, combined sales of the entire Police Quest series (including SWAT) surpassed 1.2 million units by the end of March 1996.

Computer Gaming World recommended Police Quest, praising some of the graphics as "the most terrific this reviewer has ever seen". Antic said of the ST version that because of the realism and need to follow procedures "there is a strong sense of actually becoming the cop on the beat". Macworld was less positive, stating that the game "plays like a long version of a routine cop TV show, and you can't lose if you just follow the manual. The game begs for a challenging mystery".

Police Quest was reported to have been used as a training tool for police officers.
