= Kelly Foster =

Kelly Foster may refer to:

- Kelly Foster, character in Revolution (TV series)
- Kelly Foster, character in Virus (1999 film)
- Kelly Foster, character in We Bought a Zoo
- Kelly Foster, a policewoman
