= Silent Steel =

1995 video game

- DVD version cover art
- Developer: Tsunami Games
- Publisher: Tsunami Games
- Platforms: Microsoft Windows; DVD player
- Release: September 7, 1995 (Windows); 1999 (DVD)
- Genres: Interactive movie Submarine simulator
- Mode: Single-player

Silent Steel is a 1995 submarine simulator computer game by Tsunami Games. It was created during the influx of interactive movies during the 1990s. The game is composed almost entirely of live-action full motion video, with sparse computer-generated graphics depicting external shots of the boat during torpedo attacks and atmospheric fly-bys. A version playable on DVD players was released in 1999, following from a DVD-ROM version in 1997. The DVD-ROM version was the first video game formatted for DVD.

A sequel, Silent Steel 2, was announced by Tsunami for release in 1997, but it was cancelled.

== Gameplay ==
The gameplay consists of choosing from three options when the video pauses at certain points. Once the player chooses, the video resumes. This creates several possible plotlines and outcomes. Most of these result in the destruction of the player's submarine; only two distinct threads lead to victory.

== Plot ==
The player commands USS Idaho, a fictional Ohio-class ballistic missile submarine. On a routine nuclear deterrence patrol, an encoded message is received from U.S. COMSUBLANT. The message reports that a stolen Libyan diesel sub has exited the Mediterranean Sea, possibly heading into Idaho's area of operations. Idaho must evade the potentially hostile submarine, a problem that is quickly complicated by the fact that the enemy submarine is equipped with sound-generating equipment that allows her to mimic other classes of submarine, including those of American design. The rogue Kilo-class sub uses this tactic to launch a torpedo attack on Idaho by pretending to be an allied Los Angeles-class sub, USS Biloxi.

After escaping the initial battle, a radio consultation with an American carrier battle group commander confirms that there are no other allied submarines operating in the area, and that a second hostile sub, a Russian Akula-class attack boat that has also gone rogue, is approaching the area. In addition to this, Idaho's sonar officer notices that Idaho seems to be emitting a low-frequency sonar signal that he cannot account for.

After a conference with Idaho's executive officer and master chief, further engagements commence, where Idaho eventually triumphs through subterfuge and risk-taking. Taking advantage of the lull in combat before the Akula-class submarine comes into torpedo range, a search of Idaho's outer hull reveals an act of sabotage instigated by one of the crew working for the enemy.

Engaging the Akula in a torpedo battle, Idaho gains the upper hand by the timely interference of an American ASW helicopter tracking the battle and manages to win the fight.

The game was directed by Tony Marks and the script was written by Chuck Pfarrer.

== Production ==
=== Shooting locations ===
All sound stage studio filming was conducted in a modified warehouse on the former Charleston Naval Shipyard in North Charleston, South Carolina. All submarine and ship footage was shot aboard USS Clamagore (SS-343) submarine and USS Laffey (DD-724) destroyer which are both museum ships at the Patriots Point Naval Museum in Mt. Pleasant, South Carolina.

== Cast ==
- Brian McNamara as Executive Officer
- Jim Metzler as Master Chief
- Fredric Lehne as Lt. Wheeler
- John Short as Ensign Foster
- Charles McLawhorn as Admiral Plaskett
- Joy Parry as Deputy Director Matthews
- Frank Leslie as Officer of the Deck
- James Middleton as Weapons Officer
- Keith Woullard as Chief Engineer
- Mike Kirton as Bubba Holland
- Don Soper as Ice Cream
- John Jarrett as Danny
- Mark Lattanzio as Ensign Neff
- Greg Elliott as Player Voice
- Leigh Murray as Newscast Voice
