= Pirates: The Legend of Black Kat =

2002 video game

- European PlayStation 2 box art
- Developer: Westwood Studios
- Publisher: Electronic Arts
- Designers: Michael Legg; Patrick Pannullo; Jim Walls
- Artist: Jerry O'Flaherty
- Writer: Wynne McLaughlin
- Composer: Frank Klepacki
- Platforms: PlayStation 2 Xbox
- Release: PlayStation 2: NA: February 19, 2002; EU: March 1, 2002; Xbox: NA: March 26, 2002; EU: April 19, 2002
- Genre: Action-adventure
- Mode: Single-player

Pirates: The Legend of Black Kat (whose working title was Pirates of Skull Cove) is a 2002 action-adventure video game developed by Westwood Studios and published by Electronic Arts for the PlayStation 2 and Xbox.

== Synopsis ==
The game takes place in the year 1762 and focuses on the adventures of Katarina de Leon. Leon's father is the Pirate Isles governor (Marcus de Leon) and her mother is the Pirates of Skull Cove leader (Mara Rousseau). Leon sails the Five Seas in search of her mother’s grave, and to take revenge against Captain Hawke for killing her father. Kat must search for the mystical Chartstones to get to Hawke which requires her braving the dangerous and savage islands of the Five Seas infested with Hawke’s men, the Crimson Guard.

Throughout the game, Kat confronts dangerous creatures and savages, completes quests for island inhabitants in return for help, wage naval battles against the Crimson Guard, collect magical objects and artifacts, booty and unearth buried treasure which she can use to upgrade her ship. She also discovers the truth about her mother, Mara, and ultimately avenges her father’s death by defeating the evil Captain Hawke.

== Reception ==
Reception

Aggregate score
Aggregator	Score	
Aggregator	PS2	Xbox
Metacritic	72/100	74/100

Review scores
Publication	Score	
Publication	PS2	Xbox
AllGame	3/5	3/5
Electronic Gaming Monthly	20.5/30	N/A
Eurogamer	6/10	N/A
Game Informer	7.25/10	7.5/10
GamePro	4.5/5	4/5
GameRevolution	B+	N/A
GameSpot	7.8/10	7.8/10
GameSpy	89%	64%
GameZone	7.2/10	8/10
IGN	7.3/10	6/10
Official U.S. PlayStation Magazine	3.5/5	N/A
Official Xbox Magazine (US)	N/A	7.1/10
Maxim	8/10	N/A

The game received "average" reviews on both platforms according to the review aggregation website Metacritic.
