= Earth & Beyond =

2002 video game

- Developer: Westwood Studios
- Publisher: Electronic Arts
- Producer: Eric Wang
- Designers: Brett Sperry; Louis Castle; Jim Walls
- Artist: Jerry O'Flaherty
- Composers: Frank Klepacki; David Arkenstone
- Engine: W3D (Westwood 3D) engine
- Platform: Windows
- Release: NA: 24 September 2002; UK: 4 October 2002
- Genre: Massively multiplayer online role-playing game
- Mode: Multiplayer

Earth & Beyond was a science fiction massively multiplayer online role-playing game (MMORPG) developed by Westwood Studios and published by Electronic Arts (EA). The game was released in September 2002 in the United States. EA shut down Earth & Beyond on 22 September 2004. It was the last game developed by Westwood Studios.

== History ==
Development for Earth and Beyond – originally designated as Project G – began in 1997. By 2001, Westwood had created content for over 100 sectors of playable space. Public beta for the game began on 9 March 2002, allowing up to 100,000 new players to roam the sectors and test content. The finished game was launched on September 24 the same year. It was initially shipped in limited quantities to retailers to allow for smooth experience as new players sign on to the servers. In January 2003, the main story line and accompanying events began. This required all players to download a patch and wait for servers to be upgraded. This was the first of regular monthly story driven updates designed to gradually change the game environment as the plot unfolded. In June that year, players met a new race called the V'rix. This was a substantial update to the online universe, adding many more missions for higher level players and improving the intelligence of all NPCs in the game.

== Plot ==
Earth & Beyond was set some time around AD 2575. It featured three races: the Progen, Jenquai and Terran. The Progen were a genetically-altered and advanced race. The Jenquai were philosophers who sought eternal life. The Terrans were the original humans. Each of the three races had descended from the human race on Earth. The game's storyline took place in the Milky Way Galaxy. The Progen, Terran and Jenquai were all uneasy of each other, but still managed to live together in peace. The Terrans were known for their extremely large corporations, such as Infiniti Corp. and GetCo. Infiniti Corp. was the manufacturer of the inter-system and inter-sector warp gates. The warp gates were originally created by the mysterious Ancients, an enigmatic and hyper-advanced race who had all but disappeared.

After two centuries of conflict, Humankind's three races – the Progen, Terrans and Jenquai – had achieved an uneasy balance of power by dividing known space between them. The Terrans claimed Earth, headquarters to their massive trade corporations. The genetically engineered Progen, bred for perfection, commanded the wastes of Mars. The Jenquai, ever seeking knowledge, created great space stations to orbit the moons of Jupiter. Peace was shattered when the first stargate, an ancient artifact built by an unknown people, was discovered. Coveting its secrets for their own, the Jenquai hid the Gate from the other races, but their efforts were in vain; within months, a spy employed by the Terran conglomerate InfinitiCorp revealed the Gate's existence to the outraged Terrans and Progen. Humanity was suddenly thrust into conflict, an epic battle over control of the Gate.

The three races fought a devastating nine-year war, dubbed the Gate War, using weapons far deadlier than any previously conceived. Millions of lives were lost, and millions more would have perished had the Terrans not surprised their foes with a sudden cease-fire proposal. After months of negotiations, the three civilizations agreed to share the Gate, and declared an uneasy peace, but InfinitiCorp had plans of its own. Under utmost secrecy, its scientists had reverse-engineered the Gate's technology, and within a few years the mighty conglomerate announced to the astonished worlds the genesis of the Infinitigate.

Fifty years have passed since the invention of the Infinitigate. Progen, Jenquai and Terrans alike have thrived, spreading their civilizations across a dozen star systems, exploiting their riches. Though the races are at peace, acrimony remains. Tension and distrust govern galactic relations and every citizen fears the day when the spectre of war again raises its shadow.

== Gameplay ==
Earth and Beyond was played by controlling either a humanoid or spaceship avatar in the third-person. Each game server, or Galaxy, consisted of 12 main star systems. Each system contained multiple sectors. Warp gates were used to travel from sector to sector, and system to system.

Players created a character by choosing one of the three races, and one of three professions: Warrior, Trader or Explorer. Characters gained three types of experience: Combat experience was gained through fighting and completing combat jobs (being incapacitated resulted in "EXP Debt" and the character would only receive half of the normal experience until the debt was repaid), Trade experience was gained from selling loot, by building items and by taking trade jobs, and Exploration experience was gained from visiting navigation points, mining asteroids and gas clouds, and exploration jobs. In general each system had a number of "nav points". Visiting a nav point for the first time gave a certain amount of exploration experience. After a nav point was visited, it appeared on the "radar" when the player was in the system.

Player's ships were constructed from a reactor, shield and engine. Optionally, a ship could have weapons or other devices that may buff or debuff other ships. Ship equipment could be reverse-engineered, rebuilt and enhanced. Player-made items could have better stats than dropped or purchased items, depending on the skill of the builder.

There were several varieties of boss spawns: Some were activated after a certain number of lower level monsters were killed, while others were time-based. For example, the Crystal Daeva, which produced valuable loot, had a spawn time of 72 hours. Nearly all bosses carried valuable and rare loot, which could be sold for significant amounts of cash on the in-game market.

Some sectors had areas where "Invasions" were staged. Sectors like Aragoth Prime contained a heavily defended Red Dragon base that was surrounded by multiple layers of defense turrets, carriers, battle cruisers, and frigates. Invasions often involved a multitude of clans joined to attack the base and a huge battle would ensue.

=== New player zones ===
Each race/class combination had its own starting sector. When a new character first logged onto the server they automatically appeared in the appropriate sector to begin the tutorial. The tutorial guided players through the basics of navigation, exploration, combat, and trade. Once the first set of missions was complete, the tutorial guided the player to a warp gate connected to their race's home planetary sector.

=== Leveling up ===
The maximum level in Earth and Beyond was 150. It could take many months, even a year for casual players to reach the summit. To level, a player must gain experience. Each successive level required more and more experience points. There were three types of activities that reward experience points.

Exploration experience was the first type players saw after leaving their starting sector. Exploration experience is awarded by traveling to undiscovered navigation points on the map. The amount of experience gained from each Nav Point was capped, so lower level players received the most benefit from exploring the universe.

Combat experience was awarded by engaging NPCs in the game environment and defeating them. The amount of experience gained from each encounter was based on the player's level and the level of the NPC that was killed.

When a player destroyed an enemy NPC, loot was dropped. Players could pick up this loot and sell it to NPC vendors for Trade experience. Players could also earn Trade experience by learning how to build their own components and items.

== Cancellation ==
Electronic Arts closed Earth and Beyond servers on 22 September 2004 (known as the Earth and Beyond Sunset).

== Reception ==
Reception

Aggregate score
Aggregator	Score
Metacritic	82/100

Review scores
Publication	Score
Computer Gaming World	3.5/5
Game Informer	9.25/10
GamePro	4.5/5
GameRevolution	B+
GameSpot	6.9/10
GameSpy	4/5
GameZone	8/10
IGN	8.8/10
PC Gamer (US)	80%
X-Play	4/5
The Cincinnati Enquirer	4/5
Entertainment Weekly	A−

At the time of its release, the game received "favorable" reviews according to the review aggregation website Metacritic.

Earth & Beyond was a nominee for PC Gamer US's "2002 Best Massively Multiplayer Game" award, which ultimately went to Asheron's Call 2: Fallen Kings. It was a runner-up for GameSpot's 2002 "Most Disappointing Game on PC" award, losing to Civilization III: Play the World.
