= Ringworld: Revenge of the Patriarch =

1993 video game

- Cover art by John T. Shaw
- Developer: Tsunami Games
- Publisher: Tsunami Games
- Designers: Robert Eric Heitman; Chris Hoyt; John Jarrett
- Programmers: Nancy Churchill; Robert Eric Heitman; Chris Hoyt
- Artist: Douglas Herring
- Composer: Ken Allen
- Series: Ringworld
- Platform: DOS
- Release: 1993
- Genre: Adventure
- Mode: Single-player

Ringworld: Revenge of the Patriarch is a 1993 video game by Tsunami Games for DOS. It is based on Larry Niven's Ringworld novel series. A sequel, Return to Ringworld, was released in 1994.

== Gameplay ==
Ringworld is a point and click adventure game involving puzzles.

== Plot ==
The Patriarch of the Kzinti empire has vowed revenge against the Puppeteer race for their genetic manipulation of the Kzinti. To achieve this, they have created an advanced prototype starship armed with an ancient Slaver weapon capable of destroying planets. The Patriarch first dispatches the ship with the goal of killing the family of the Kzin traitor Speaker-to-Animals, who has taken the name Chmeee. Once done, they will then seek out the home world of the Puppeteers and destroy it. The human Quinn is also travelling to meet with Chmeee to help find Louis Wu who has disappeared. Together, Quinn and Chmeee must travel to Ringworld to find Louis Wu and stop the Kzinti's genocidal plot against the Puppeteers.

== Reception ==
In 1996, Computer Gaming World declared Ringworld the 14th-worst computer game ever released.

== Legacy ==
A sequel, Return to Ringworld, was published in 1994.

== Reviews ==
- Power Play (German) (May 1993)
- Play Time (German) (May 1993)
- Joystick (French) (September 1993)
- PC Joker (March 1993)
- Power Play (April 1993)
