= Ron Faber =

American actor (1933–2023)

- Born: February 16, 1933; Milwaukee, Wisconsin, U.S.
- Died: March 26, 2023 (aged 90); New York, U.S.
- Occupation: Actor
- Notable work: The Exorcist; Navy SEALs
- Spouse: Kathleen Moore Faber

Ron Faber (February 16, 1933 – March 26, 2023) was an American actor. He had roles in films like The Exorcist, Navy SEALs, The Private Files of J. Edgar Hoover, and Soup for One. He also had roles in off-Broadway productions like And They Put Handcuffs on Flowers, Stonewall Jackson's House, and Troilus and Cressida. He died of lung cancer in New York on March 26, 2023, at the age of 90.
