= Police Quest III: The Kindred =

1991 video game

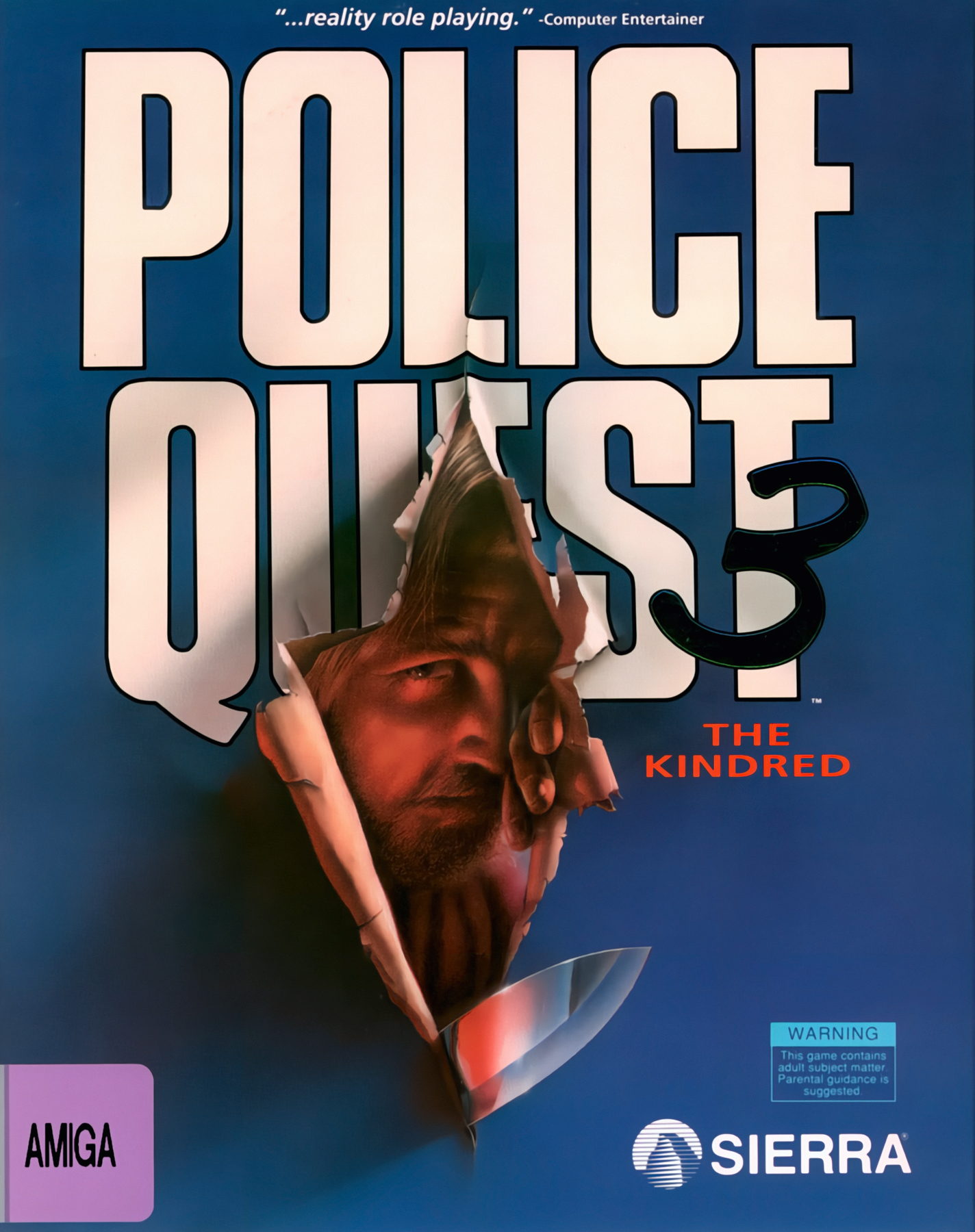
- Amiga cover art
- Developer: Sierra On-Line
- Publisher: Sierra On-Line
- Director: Mark Crowe
- Producer: Guruka Singh-Khalsa
- Designer: Jim Walls
- Programmer: Doug Oldfield
- Artist: Mark Crowe
- Composer: Jan Hammer
- Series: Police Quest
- Engine: SCI
- Platforms: MS-DOS, Amiga
- Release: 1991
- Genre: Adventure game
- Mode: Single-player

Police Quest III: The Kindred (also known as Police Quest III) is a 1991 police procedural point-and-click adventure video game developed and published by Jim Walls and Sierra On-Line. It is the third installment in the Police Quest series. The game finishes the story of police officer Sonny Bonds, who seeks revenge after his wife is attacked by an unknown assailant.

Police Quest III was positively received by critics and sold well. A sequel, Police Quest: Open Season, was released in 1993, but featured an entirely different story and setting.

== Gameplay ==
Police Quest III uses a point and click interface common to adventure games of the time. The mouse is used to select and interact with objects from the game world and the player's inventory, as well as to direct the player character around the various environments. For the most part the player is able to take their time in examining clues and solving puzzles, though there are also several time sensitive combat situations, in which the player must quickly access and use their sidearm to shoot a suspect before being shot first.

The game also features a manual driving minigame whenever the player travels from one location to another; it is similar to that found in the original Police Quest, though the interface has been simplified and streamlined. In order to complete the driving sequences, the player must refer to a printed map which was packaged with the game, a gameplay element which was intended as a form of copy protection. There are also several points in the game in which, after arresting a suspect, a five digit "offense code" must be given correctly; they are only available from the game's physical manual.

== Plot ==
In 1991, Sonny Bonds returns to the city of Lytton, California with his new wife Marie Bonds (née Wilkans) and reassumes his former position as an officer of the Lytton Police Department, being promoted to sergeant due to his experience and seniority. On his first day back, Bonds is assigned to patrol due to an understaffing issue, and handles a call involving a mentally unstable man. Bonds becomes concerned about Officer Pat Morales, against whom numerous complaints have been filed over her behavior and attitude. Before his shift can end, Bonds is dispatched to a stabbing at a mall, and is horrified to learn that the victim is Marie, who survives the attack but falls into a coma. Bonds vows to exact his revenge against Marie's unidentified attackers.

The next day, Bonds is assigned to Homicide Division to investigate a connection between the assault and another stabbing, but is surprised to find Morales working alongside him on the case as his new partner. Investigating the evidence and the previous stabbing, Bonds links it to an unsolved murder, in which the victim had a pentagram carved into their body post mortem. With the help of a witness, Bonds identifies the suspect as Steve Rocklin, whose background includes links to a cult that deals cocaine. A few days later, Bonds and Morales are called to investigate a dead body in an alleyway, and determine it to be murder and linked to their investigation. Suspecting the cult link might be relevant and that Rocklin is the killer, Bonds and Morales predict where he will strike next and prevent him from killing again. Bonds and Morales pursue Rocklin, who is eventually killed in a traffic collision.

Investigating Rocklin's motive for the murders, Bonds and Morales realize that someone else is involved in the crimes: alongside finding cocaine in Rocklin's wrecked car, someone had torched Rocklin's home before investigators could search it. Bonds learns that Rocklin had connections to the late Jesse Bains and his brother Michael Bains, whom he learns is psychotic and extremely dangerous. At the same time, Bonds becomes suspicious of Morales' behavior, including a series of suspicious phone calls, and reports her to internal affairs after discovering some of the seized cocaine in her police locker.

Tracking Michael to a run-down house, Bonds and Morales acquire a search warrant and call for backup before raiding the house, defeating Michael and the cult members. Morales suddenly turns on Bonds and holds him at gunpoint, revealing herself as the cult's mole in the department, but is promptly gunned down by an internal affairs detective, who reveals they had been monitoring Morales since Bonds' report. With the case concluded, Bonds visits Marie in the hospital, where she regains consciousness and announces she is pregnant with their first child.

== Development ==
Released in 1991 for SCI version 1, Police Quest III is completely mouse-driven. It was only released for the IBM PC and the Amiga. During the late development stages of this game, Jim Walls left Sierra due to "circumstances". Sierra employee Jane Jensen finalized the writing for the still unfinished Police Quest III, and former LAPD chief Daryl F. Gates was named to take over the Police Quest series. Walls, along with several former Sierra employees, would go on to design Blue Force.

A Sega CD port of the game was announced, but was never released.

== Reception ==
The first four Police Quest games totaled 850,000 sales by late 1995. However, Markus Krichel of PC Games noted that "interest on the part of the gamer fell slightly" with Police Quest: Open Season, which led Sierra On-Line to experiment with a new direction for the series with Police Quest: SWAT. According to Sierra, combined sales of the Police Quest series—including SWAT—surpassed 1.2 million units by the end of March 1996.

Computer Gaming World called Police Quest III "the best of the series to date", stating that the no-typing interface greatly improved gameplay. Amiga User International praised the graphics and realism of the Amiga version and gave the game a score of 91%. In reviewing the PC version, Zero likewise praised the graphics and realism, though they were critical of the long load times when moving from one location to another and the precision demanded by the controls, and awarded the game a total score of 79%. In 1992, Dragon gave the game 2 out of 5 stars.
