= Jim Walls =

American video game designer

- Walls in 1989
- Born: California, U.S.
- Occupation: Video game designer
- Known for: Police Quest
- Website: www.jimwallsreloaded.com

Jim Walls is an American video game designer. He is notable for having designed the successful Police Quest series of adventure games for Sierra On-Line.

After working as a California Highway Patrol officer from 1971 to 1986, Walls met Sierra president Ken Williams, who wished to create an adventure game in the police procedural genre. Walls, though inexperienced with computers, offered his policing experience. During his career at Sierra, Walls designed the first three Police Quest entries and Codename: ICEMAN.

After leaving Sierra in the early 1990s, Walls joined several other game developers, including Tsunami Media in 1992 and Westwood Studios in 1996, before retiring in 2003. In 2013, Walls planned to develop Precinct, a spiritual successor to Police Quest, but the crowdfunding campaign failed.

== Early life ==
Walls was born and raised in California. He worked as an optician for seven years before graduating from the California Highway Patrol police academy in December 1971. In January 1984, while conducting a traffic stop, Walls was involved in a shootout. Though he survived the incident, he began to experience post-traumatic stress symptoms, and in 1985, he was placed on administrative leave to evaluate his condition. Walls retired from the CHP in 1986 after 15 years of service.

== Video game career ==
=== Sierra On-Line ===
While still on administrative leave in 1985, Walls' then-wife Donna, a hairdresser in Oakhurst, introduced him to Ken Williams, the co-founder and then-president of Sierra On-Line, who was a friend and frequent customer of Donna's salon. During a conversation, Williams discussed how he wanted to produce a police procedural adventure game, particularly one with a police officer assisting its development to ensure realism and authenticity. At the time, Sierra had produced numerous adventure games across a variety of genres—such as the King's Quest fantasy series, the Space Quest science fiction series, and the Leisure Suit Larry sex comedy series—but not many games following police or particularly modern settings. In 1987, after Walls retired from the CHP, Williams and Walls discussed their concept of a police adventure game, and Williams asked Walls to condense his experiences in the CHP into a short story. When Walls wrote the story, Williams was impressed and asked Walls to expand upon it; this short story soon developed into the plot of the first Police Quest game, at which point the story was converted into a game design document for development.

At the time, Walls was unfamiliar with computers, and was unsure if video game design was a viable career. Describing his experience writing the initial story concept, Walls reminisced: "When I first sat down in front of a computer to begin the design story of the original Police Quest, I had to be shown where the on/off switch was. I typed the entire story with two fingers (after all, the only skills I had at the time were chasing people down and throwing them in jail)." However, he soon overcame his concerns, and his computer skills developed with help from fellow Sierra designers Ken Williams, Roberta Williams, Mark Crowe, Scott Murphy, and Al Lowe. Many aspects of Police Quest were based on aspects of Walls' life: the series protagonist, Sonny Bonds, was loosely based on Walls' son (also named Sonny), and many incidents encountered in the game (and the next two Police Quest installments) were inspired by actual incidents encountered by Walls over the course of his CHP career.

In 1987, Police Quest: In Pursuit of the Death Angel was released. The game placed heavy focus on realism and proper police procedure to succeed. Walls considered fan mail sent in by players, ranging from active police officers to children that wanted to become police officers because of the game, as the "ultimate reward". Walls' career in Sierra continued with the development of Police Quest II: The Vengeance in 1988, Codename: ICEMAN in 1989, and Police Quest III: The Kindred in 1991. Walls also made self-insert cameos in the Police Quest games; he appears in name only in each game's police database as an officer or criminal, his mugshot appears in the intro cutscene of Police Quest II, and he physically appears in Police Quest III's intro and game over sequences.

He resigned from Sierra after the release of Police Quest III, recalling on a personal blog later that: "circumstances developed causing me to decide it was time that I leave." Following Walls' resignation, the Police Quest series continued, but under the direction of former Los Angeles Police Department Chief Daryl F. Gates, who changed the setting of the series from the fictional city of Lytton, California to his more familiar setting of Los Angeles.

=== Post-Sierra ===
In 1992, Walls joined Tsunami Media, which largely consisted of former Sierra employees and was also housed in Oakhurst. Walls' time with Tsunami Media was brief, and he only worked on one game for Tsunami, 1993's Blue Force, a spiritual successor to the original Police Quest trilogy. After leaving Tsunami Media, Walls contracted with two other companies—Tachyon Studios and Philips Interactive Media—for games that would ultimately never see release.

In 1996, Walls was contracted by Las Vegas-based Westwood Studios to work on 1997's Blade Runner. He was subsequently offered a full-time design position, working on Pirates: The Legend of Black Kat and Earth & Beyond, both released in 2002. In 2003, Westwood Studios was bought out by Electronic Arts and merged into EA Los Angeles, with most employees, including Walls, let go as part of the company's acquisition.

==== Precinct ====
On February 2, 2013, during a podcast hosted by Chris Pope, Walls announced he had plans to develop a successor to Police Quest, using Kickstarter for funding. On July 16, 2013, the new game proposal was finally announced as Precinct, a 3D adventure game serving as a modern spiritual successor to Police Quest. The game, following police officer Maxwell Jones in the city of Fraser Canyon, California, would be developed by Jim Walls Reloaded, led by Walls and Sierra developer Robert Lindsley. A fundraising campaign was held from July 16 to August 16 with a maximum goal of $500,000, but it was unsuccessful, and Walls prematurely canceled the campaign on August 6. An alternate fundraising campaign was held without the time restriction, but it was also unsuccessful and was shut down due to a lack of momentum. Ultimately, the fundraising campaign did not surpass $7,000.

== Games ==
Year	Game title	Developer/publisher	Role(s)
1987	Police Quest: In Pursuit of the Death Angel	Sierra On-Line	Designer, writer
1988	Police Quest II: The Vengeance	Sierra On-Line	Designer, writer
1989	Codename: ICEMAN	Sierra On-Line	Designer
1991	Police Quest III: The Kindred	Sierra On-Line	Designer
1993	Blue Force	Tsunami Media	Designer
1997	Blade Runner	Westwood Studios/Virgin Interactive	Designer, programmer, voice actor
2002	Pirates: The Legend of Black Kat	Westwood Studios/Electronic Arts	Designer
2002	Earth & Beyond	Westwood Studios/Electronic Arts	Designer
