= Mystery Date =

1991 film by Jonathan Wacks

- Theatrical release poster
- Directed by: Jonathan Wacks
- Written by: Parker Bennett; Terry Runte
- Produced by: Cathleen Summers
- Starring: Ethan Hawke; Teri Polo; Brian McNamara; Fisher Stevens; B.D. Wong
- Cinematography: Oliver Wood
- Edited by: Tina Hirsch
- Music by: John Du Prez
- Production company: Cathleen Summers
- Distributed by: Orion Pictures
- Release date: August 16, 1991
- Running time: 97 minutes
- Country: United States
- Language: English
- Budget: $10 million
- Box office: $6.2 million

Mystery Date is a 1991 American dark comedy film directed by Jonathan Wacks, and starring Ethan Hawke, Teri Polo, and Brian McNamara. Shock-rockers Gwar have a brief cameo in the film.

== Plot ==
Tom McHugh quickly learns that his perfect big brother Craig isn't all he's cracked up to be while on a night on the town with the girl next door, during which Tom is harassed by unpleasant strangers, threatened by mobsters, pursued by police, attacked by an irate florist, accused of murder, and has his date kidnapped—all because everyone thinks he's Craig...and the classic 1959 DeSoto Firesweep he borrowed off his brother has two dead bodies in the trunk.

== Cast ==
- Ethan Hawke as Tom McHugh
- Teri Polo as Geena Matthews
- Brian McNamara as Craig McHugh
- Fisher Stevens as Dwight
- BD Wong as James Lew
- Tony Rosato as Sharpie
- Don S. Davis as Doheny
- James Hong as Fortune Teller
- Victor Wong as The Janitor
- Ping Wu as Vince
- Duncan Fraser as Crully
- Jerry Wasserman as Detective Al Condon
- Terry David Mulligan as Mr. McHugh
- Merrilyn Gann as Mrs. McHugh
- Stephen Chang as Ben
- Russell Jung as Jerry
- Michele Little as Stella
- Allan Lysell as Mr. Lusky
- Donna Lysell as Mrs. Lusky
- Keith Beardwood as Mr. Culp
- Sharlene Martin as Suzette
- Celia Martin as Sandy
- Ian Black as Limo Driver
- Karen Campbell as Suzy
- Sean Orr as Aldo
- Dave 'Squatch' Ward as Earl
- Peter Williams as The Bartender
- Constance Barnes as Bonna
- Todd Duckworth as Motorcycle Cop

== Reception ==
Mystery Date holds a 25% approval rating on Rotten Tomatoes based on eight reviews; the average rating is 4.7/10.

Desson Howe from The Washington Post wrote: "Mystery Date is an exclamation point movie. Built on nothing but zany high points, it survives entirely on plot surprise. Maybe this kind of Date is for you! But guess what! I'd rather be at the pub!"
