= A Diva's Christmas Carol =

2000 television film directed by Richard Schenkman

- Promotional Art
- Genre: Comedy; Fantasy; Musical
- Based on: A Christmas Carol by Charles Dickens
- Written by: Richard Schenkman
- Directed by: Richard Schenkman
- Starring: Vanessa L. Williams; Rozonda "Chilli" Thomas; Brian McNamara; Kathy Griffin
- Music by: Christopher Lennertz
- Country of origin: United States
- Original language: English

Production
- Executive producer: Patricia Clifford
- Producer: Claudio Castravelli
- Cinematography: Bruce Chun
- Editor: Neil Grieve
- Running time: 120 minutes
- Production companies: VH1; Viacom Productions

Original release
- Network: VH1
- Release: December 13, 2000

A Diva's Christmas Carol is a 2000 American Christmas musical comedy television film written and directed by Richard Schenkman and starring Vanessa L. Williams, Rozonda "Chilli" Thomas, Brian McNamara and Kathy Griffin. The film is based on Charles Dickens' 1843 novel A Christmas Carol, and features an ego-driven popular singer who gets a reality check by three Christmas spirits. The film premiered on VH1 on December 13, 2000.

== Plot ==
Ebony Scrooge is one of the world's most successful pop stars. However, her cold-hearted soul and attitude make her manager Bob Cratchett and her band unhappy. She also neglects her niece Olivia, causing her husband's unhappiness.

While in New York for a charity concert, Ebony (who was once part of the 1980s trio "Desire") is visited by the ghost of one of her former singing partners, Marli Jacob, who died in a car crash in 1990. She informs Ebony that she was unhappy with her for willingly abandoning her during her struggles with her drug addiction which ultimately led to the car accident that killed her. She also mentions that God knows Ebony took advantage of Marli's untimely death to plot her solo career and the fact that she is using the charity concert as an excuse to add to her own wealth (She was planning on only having a very small percentage of the money made off of the concert actually donated to the poor, and pocketing the rest as "Production expenses"). Because of this, she is still earthbound and in chains. Marli warns Ebony that she may face a similar fate and informs her that she will be visited by three spirits, who will hopefully turn Ebony's life around.

The Ghost of Christmas Past shows Ebony her tragic past with her abusive, alcoholic father, and how she partly became the cold person she is today because of this. The only person who made Ebony feel loved was her brother, Ronnie, and he tried to continue to be positive for their family, even after the two were removed from their father's custody by their grandmother's call to child services, and separated in foster care. It was also revealed that even though Ebony had been adopted into a nice family and managed to keep in touch with Ronnie, she had refused to visit her father, whom she has never forgiven for the abuse he put both her and Ronnie through. While Ronnie tried to give their father a second chance after he seemingly improved his ways by moving back home with him, he soon learned that Ebony had been right about their father not having changed after he began drinking again. Ronnie subsequently left home for good and later married straight out of high school and had Olivia, before dying of a sudden brain aneurysm.

During her years as Desire's lead singer, Ebony was in a relationship with Bob, who was a DJ at the time, and he was considering marrying her before she broke up with him, favoring her career over love. Ebony had worked well with Desire until her coldness caused rifts, which, combined with Marli's drug problems, eventually broke up the band. Before leaving her, the ghost takes Ebony to Terry Freeman, Desire's other singer and Ebony and Marli's once-close friend, who is now a destitute Meals on Wheels client due to Ebony abandoning her following Marli's untimely death and crushing her financially in a lawsuit regarding the "Desire" name and brand. The ghost confronts Ebony over her maltreatment of Terry over the years, saying she should never have abandoned her friend when she needed her. Ebony tries to attack the ghost, only to be brought back to her suite.

Ebony then finds a wild party in her suite, with a heavy metal rocker at the center of the chaos. He is the Ghost of Christmas Present, who shows her how she is overworking Bob and her crew. She comes to learn just how much her band really hates her and that they insult her behind her back. Ebony shows sympathy and concern for Bob's ailing son Tim, slowly realizing just how strained his relationship with his family is. The ghost also shows Ebony her accountant Ernie Hoskins is spending his Christmas with his girlfriend; Ernie lets slip to her that he has been able to pay for his lifestyle by embezzling from her accounts over the years. This angers Ebony because Ernie was supposed to be her trusted accountant, and also makes her realize why he has always insisted on her staying on a tight budget – the less she spends, the more he can steal from her. The Ghost then takes Ebony to see the homeless people her concert is supposed to benefit, but whom she has never interacted with, showing her how they enjoy Christmas despite having nothing. Lastly, the Ghost takes her to the apartment of her estranged niece Olivia. Olivia informs her husband and friends that despite Ebony's cold attitude, she still loves her aunt. Ebony starts regretting how she treated Olivia in the past and finally appreciates that she is the only living blood relative she has left. At this point, she starts to see everything in a new light and feels terrible about the way that she mistreated Olivia, Bob, and her band. Before leaving, the Ghost warns Ebony of the two main killers that could destroy her own life: Ignorance and Greed. Ebony reluctantly allows Bob to rush home to be with his wife Kelly and sick son Tim.

The last spirit (the Ghost of Christmas Future) is the one that gets through to Ebony. The Ghost is depicted as a miniature television showing a tragic episode of Behind the Music, which depicts many artists such as Brian McKnight commenting on the life and death of Ebony Scrooge. Her former bandmates use the show to air out their grievances about who she really is inside, ruining her public image in the process. The matter is made worse when one of her disgruntled former backup singers, Tina, theorizes that Ebony had planned to destroy Desire herself by setting up Marli to die in her car accident and deliberately financially ruining Terry, so she could take advantage and make her own solo career more successful. While Bob debunks Tina's theory in Ebony's defense, he also reveals how much he couldn't forgive her for making him work on Christmas; this led to both him missing Tim's death and Kelly divorcing him, a revelation that breaks Ebony's heart. It is also revealed that she died flat broke due to both Ernie draining her finances and her own career floundering in her last years. Ebony also discovers that Olivia was the only person who attended her funeral, while everyone else benefited from her death; A sleazy record- label producer in the episode proudly reveals that Ebony recorded a single just before her death, and he then rush- released it immediately after her death as a memorial single which he made a fortune off of, exploiting her death for profit. The television then begins to pull Ebony into its black void as she screams for help. She begs God to grant her a second chance to make up for her cruelty and let her reopen her heart to Christmas once more.

The next morning, Ebony awakens and opens her heart to Christmas once again. During an interview, she mentions that she will do all she can to help the homeless and is open to suggestions for how to alleviate the stress of poverty. Ebony also apologizes for allowing her latest CD to be overpriced. She hires a chef (revealed to be Wolfgang Puck) to make a lavish Christmas dinner for her crew and encourages them to invite their families to her concert by buying up every ticket to the show that she can, over Ernie's protests regarding her budget. Ebony next reconciles with her niece Olivia, who reveals her pregnancy, and invites Terry to perform with her. She then makes one final stop before the concert by rushing to the airport and stopping Bob from boarding his plane, revealing that she has flown both his wife and Tim to join him in New York instead. After offering Bob an extended vacation to be with his family, Ebony reveals that she has pulled strings to get Tim into the best pediatric hospital in New York, and will personally fund his medical care to help him recover.

That night, the concert is a big success. During the show, Ebony declares all proceeds and donations (over $1 million) will go to charity. She then fires Ernie and has him arrested for his embezzlement by the police. When he asks his girlfriend for help, she reveals herself to be an undercover FBI agent. Ernie protests his innocence as he is taken away to be booked, and Ebony apologizes for the inconvenience her ex-manager brought them. Now wearing angelic robes, Marli watches Ebony and Terry reunite and perform "Sleigh Ride", an old song from their repertoire, and Ebony sees Marli blow her and Terry a kiss before departing for heaven.

A year later, Ebony, Terry, Bob, Kelly, and a healthy Tim are seen with Olivia's family and her usual guests at her perennial Christmas party. Ebony and Terry reconcile their friendship while planning to reform the Desire group again in honor of Marli. She playfully orders her great-niece to not make a mess of her.

== Cast ==
- Vanessa L. Williams – Ebony Scrooge
  - Vanessa Morgan - Young Ebony
  - Helena-Alexis Seymour - Teen Ebony
- Rozonda "Chilli" Thomas – Marli Jacob
- Brian McNamara – Bob Cratchett
- Kathy Griffin – Ghost of Christmas Past
- John Taylor – Ghost of Christmas Present
- Amanda Brugel – Olivia
- Stephanie Biddle – Terry Freeman
- Richard Jutras – Ernie Hoskins
- Linda Goodwin – Kelly Cratchett
- Joshua Archambault - Tim Cratchett
- Nwamiko Madden - Ronnie
  - Ade Obayomi - Young Ronnie
- Michelle Lipper – Tina
- Amy Sloan – Patrice
- Henri Pardo – Matt
- Christian Paul – Lance
- Warren "Slim" Williams – Ebony's Father
- Nile Rodgers - Record Label CEO
- Jim Forbes - Himself
- Brian McKnight - Himself

== Soundtrack ==
Vanessa Williams sang the songs for the movie's soundtrack, including the original songs "Heart of Christmas" and "Heartquake" (featuring Rozonda Thomas). She also sings a remake of the 1948 holiday classic "Sleigh Ride".

== Release ==
The film premiered on VH1 on December 13, 2000. Paramount Pictures released the film on DVD in Region 1 on November 19, 2002.

== See also ==
- List of Christmas films
- List of ghost films
- Adaptations of A Christmas Carol
