= Brian McNamara =

American actor

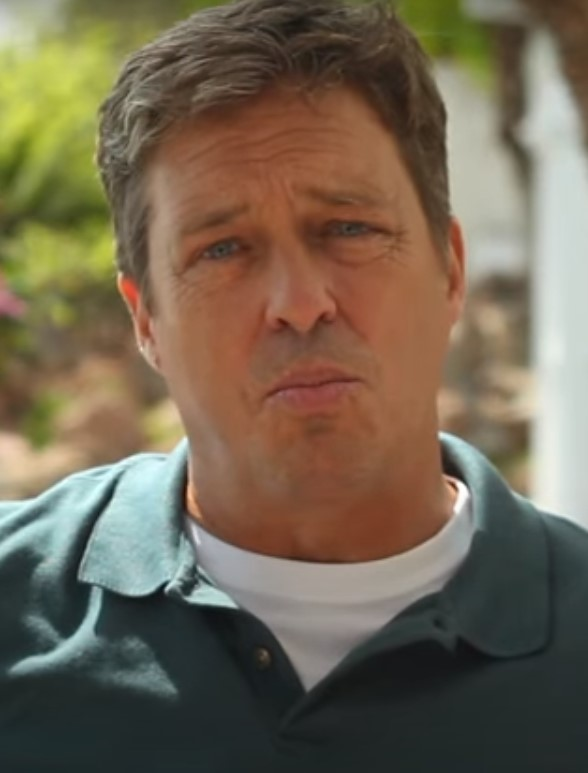
- McNamara in 2015
- Born: November 21, 1960 (age 65); Long Island, New York, USA
- Occupation: Actor
- Years active: 1984–present
- Children: 2

Brian McNamara (born November 21, 1960, in Long Island, New York, USA) is an American actor. His first major role was in the film The Flamingo Kid (1984). He then went on to appear in a few films, such as Short Circuit (1986), Caddyshack II (1988), Arachnophobia (1990) and Mystery Date (1991).

He was nominated for a Golden Globe Award for playing Dean Karny in the television film Billionaire Boys Club (1987). His most popular role was as Michael Holden in the television series Army Wives (2007–2013).

== Career ==
Early in his career, McNamara played Todd Young in Caddyshack II (1988). He had roles in such feature films as Arachnophobia and Short Circuit. He guest-starred in such television series as NYPD Blue, The O.C., Seinfeld, St. Elsewhere, JAG, Ned & Stacey, Star Trek: Voyager, Mad About You, Matlock, Diagnosis: Murder, Ellen, Murder, She Wrote, Murphy Brown, Monk, The Suite Life of Zack & Cody, CSI: Cyber, and Army Wives. He starred in the 2000 television movie A Diva's Christmas Carol.

One of his earliest roles was as Greg, Alex Keaton's friend who is killed in a car accident in the 1987 Family Ties episode "A, My Name Is Alex" for which the writer won an Emmy Award. He had a lead role in the short-lived 1989 NBC sitcom The Nutt House. He also starred in the Disney sci-fi tele-movie Earth Star Voyager and had a lead role on the television series Manhattan, AZ in 2000. He had a starring role in the film The Legend of Tillamook's Gold. Most recently, he had a starring role as General Holden, husband of Claudia-Joy Holden (Kim Delaney), on the Lifetime series Army Wives (2007-2013).

McNamara guest starred in 2009 Ghost Whisperer (s4e14) as Douglas Marks. He also appeared in the 2010 NCIS: Los Angeles episode "Little Angels" and was in the full motion video game Silent Steel in 1995.

== Filmography ==
Year	Title	Role	Notes
1984	The Flamingo Kid	Steve Dawkins	
1986	Short Circuit	Frank	
1987	In the Mood	George	
1988	Caddyshack II	Todd Young	
1988	Earth Star Voyager	Jonathan Hays	
1989	Tennessee Waltz	Deputy sheriff Hewitt	
1990	Arachnophobia	Chris Collins	
1991	Mystery Date	Craig McHugh	
1992	When the Party's Over	Taylor	
1996	Punctul zero	Peter	
1997	Seduction in a Small Town	Paul Jenks	
2000	Gone in 60 Seconds	Parking Garage Attendant	Uncredited
2000	The Mystery of Spoon River	Jesse Hanson	
2000	A Diva's Christmas Carol	Bob Cratchett	
2002	You Got Nothin	Willy	
2004	The Gunman	Roland	
2004	Paparazzi	Bo's Agent	
2006	The Tillamook Treasure	Robert Kimbell	
2006	Lost Signal	Carl Nasland	
2007	I Know Who Killed Me	Fred Toland	
2012	Changing Hearts	Henry Reed	
2015	Kidnapped: The Hannah Anderson Story	Brent Anderson	
2019	Christmas in Louisiana	Mark	

== Video games ==
Year	Title	Role	Notes
1995	Silent Steel	Executive Officer	
2019	Judgment	Ryuzo Genda, Presiding Judge	
2021	Lost Judgment	Ryuzo Genda	
