= Man Enough =

1993 video game

- Developer: Tsunami Media
- Publisher: Tsunami Media
- Platform: MS-DOS
- Release: 1993
- Genre: Dating sim
- Mode: Single-player

Man Enough (also known as Man Enough: The Ultimate Social Adventure) is a 1993 dating video game from Tsunami Media.

== Gameplay ==
Man Enough is a 1994 dating simulator and romantic adventure, featuring FMV and dialogue trees. The player begins as a lonely man handed a card to the dating agency by a friend named Nick. From there, the player makes seduction attempts with five women—Blair, Erin, Quinn, Fawn, and Kellie—each with their own quirks, turn-ons, and scripted rejection paths. Gameplay revolves around choosing dialogue options from conversation trees, where success involves using lines from the character bios in the game manual. Even with a success, the dates end in bizarre ways including: a helicopter interrupting a picnic, a paintball ambush, or a woman revealing she is a developer plant. Eventually, the player is invited to date Jeri, the agency's FMV hostess, who challenges the player to skydive solo as a final test. If the player survives and says the right lines, the player is rewarded with intimacy—only to discover it was all a month-long prank orchestrated by Nick and the women. The game ends with Jeri telling the player he is "Man Enough."

== Development ==
Man Enough was developed by Tsunami Media, a company founded in 1991.

== Reception ==
Reception

Review scores
Publication	Score
Aktueller Software Markt	2/12
Entertainment Weekly	D+
Pelit	15/100
PC Player	34/100

Entertainment Weekly gave Man Enough a D+ rating, saying, "Man Enough doesn't have the courage of its own sleaziness, as the final encounters are all interrupted before anything happens. Expensive frustration, then-and God help the boob who tries these sub-Club Med lines out on human females".

Man Enough sold 30,000 copies.
