= Navy SEALs (film) =

1990 film by Lewis Teague

- Theatrical poster
- Directed by: Lewis Teague
- Written by: Chuck Pfarrer; Gary Goldman
- Produced by: Brenda Feigen; Bernard Williams
- Starring: Charlie Sheen; Michael Biehn; Joanne Whalley-Kilmer; Rick Rossovich; Cyril O'Reilly; Bill Paxton; Dennis Haysbert; Paul Sanchez
- Cinematography: John A. Alonzo
- Edited by: Don Zimmerman
- Music by: Sylvester Levay
- Production company: Orion Pictures
- Distributed by: Orion Pictures
- Release date: July 20, 1990
- Running time: 113 minutes
- Country: United States
- Languages: English; Arabic
- Budget: $21 million
- Box office: $25.1 million

Navy SEALs is a 1990 American military action film, directed by Lewis Teague, written by Chuck Pfarrer and Gary Goldman, and produced by Brenda Feigen and Bernard Williams with consultant William Bradley. The film stars Charlie Sheen, Michael Biehn, Joanne Whalley-Kilmer, Rick Rossovich, Cyril O'Reilly, Bill Paxton, Dennis Haysbert, and Paul Sanchez.

== Plot ==
Aircraft carrier USS Forrestal receives a mayday from a civilian cargo ship named the Kuwaiti Star in the Mediterranean Sea. Kuwaiti Star reports that they have been attacked, are on fire and adrift. A deployed Navy SH-3 helicopter attempts to rescue the crew, but is downed by a gunboat and the aircrew is captured by terrorists affiliated with Ben Shaheed.

Meanwhile, United States Navy SEALs Dale Hawkins, James Curran, William "Billy" Graham, James Leary, Homer Rexer, Floyd "God" Dane, and Ramos are recovering from a bachelor party. Graham is to be married to Jolena, but the wedding is postponed when the whole team is paged to rescue the captured aircrew.

In the Mediterranean, Shaheed chastises his men for shooting down the helicopter and orders the hostages' execution. One crew member is executed, but the other two are saved by the SEALs. Reacting to a suspicious noise, Hawkins breaks silence when he encounters Shaheed in an adjoining room, inadvertently alerting the terrorists.

Shaheed disguises himself as a civilian sailor, but is left by the SEALs. As the SEALs evacuate the hostages from the area, Hawkins and Graham stumble across a warehouse containing Stinger missiles. Hawkins is ordered by Curran to proceed with extraction. Curran's decision to leave the Stinger missiles behind is questioned by Naval Intelligence, but Curran retorts that his primary mission was to rescue the aircrew and that Naval Intelligence did not do their job properly. Off duty while golfing with his team, Hawkins car gets towed and winds up chasing down the truck to recover his vehicle.

The Joint Chiefs are briefed on the recent mission and Curran requests permission to destroy the Stingers, but Navy Intelligence has learned they have already been relocated. The SEALs are then deployed to Syria to board a merchant ship, Latanya, where the Stingers are supposedly located. The SEALs deploy from a submerged submarine, USS Nyack, and successfully board the ship, neutralizing two disguised gunmen, only to find out from an EOD team that the missiles are not on board.

Frustrated by the recent unreliable intelligence, Curran solicits journalist Claire Varrens's cooperation by giving her access to the SEAL training facilities. Claire is initially wary but opens up to Curran after learning that a Stinger has been used to shoot down a peace delegation in Lebanon. Claire provides pictures of men she has encountered who may provide information on the Stinger missiles' location.

While trying to identify possible contacts, Claire tells Curran and Hawkins that one of her contacts is missing, assumed to be kidnapped by the Israelis. Inspired by this and an outburst by Hawkins, Curran presents the idea of kidnapping a potential informant to the Joint Chiefs at the National Security Council meeting. A CIA executive at the meeting identifies one of the targets as a known and reliable CIA informant, authorizing a capture mission.

The SEALs infiltrate the area by performing a HALO jump and swimming to shore. Curran leads several of the team inside a house to secure the informant while Hawkins, Ramos, and Graham remain outside. When Ramos is pinned down by patrolling militia, Hawkins disobeys Curran's order to stay quiet and instigates a firefight, resulting in Graham's death.

Curran informs Jolena of his death, and a funeral with full military honors is held. Curran scolds Hawkins for his carelessness. Later, Claire arrives at Curran's houseboat to find a still grieving Curran, leading to a night of intimacy.

Disguised as Lebanese militiamen, the SEALs are deployed to Beirut, entering via Zodiac rubber inflatable boats, this time to meet a local resistance fighter from the AMAL militia who will guide them to the building containing the Stingers. The SEALs locate the Stingers in an old school building in a heavily bombed area of the city, but Dane is killed during the trek to the school. Curran leads Leary and Rexer inside the building to destroy the missiles while Hawkins and Ramos maintain overwatch outside. Hawkins shoots a local gunman questioning him, alerting the terrorists.

The exfiltration runs into complications: Curran is wounded, forcing the SEALs to commandeer a civilian car, prompting a pursuit by an enemy BTR-152 Armoured personnel carrier (APC). The pursuit ends with Rexer killed by a stray bullet, and Leary destroying it with a commandeered Stinger Launcher. Shaheed steals a boat from a pier-side fisherman and follows the SEALs across the water. He spots Curran's body floating in the sea. As he attempts to pull the body from the water he is attacked by the SEALs and, in an underwater fight, Hawkins kills Shaheed. The other SEALs take out the remaining topside terrorists and destroy the small boat. With the mission finally accomplished, the designated exfiltration submarine surfaces, recovering the SEALs.

== Cast ==
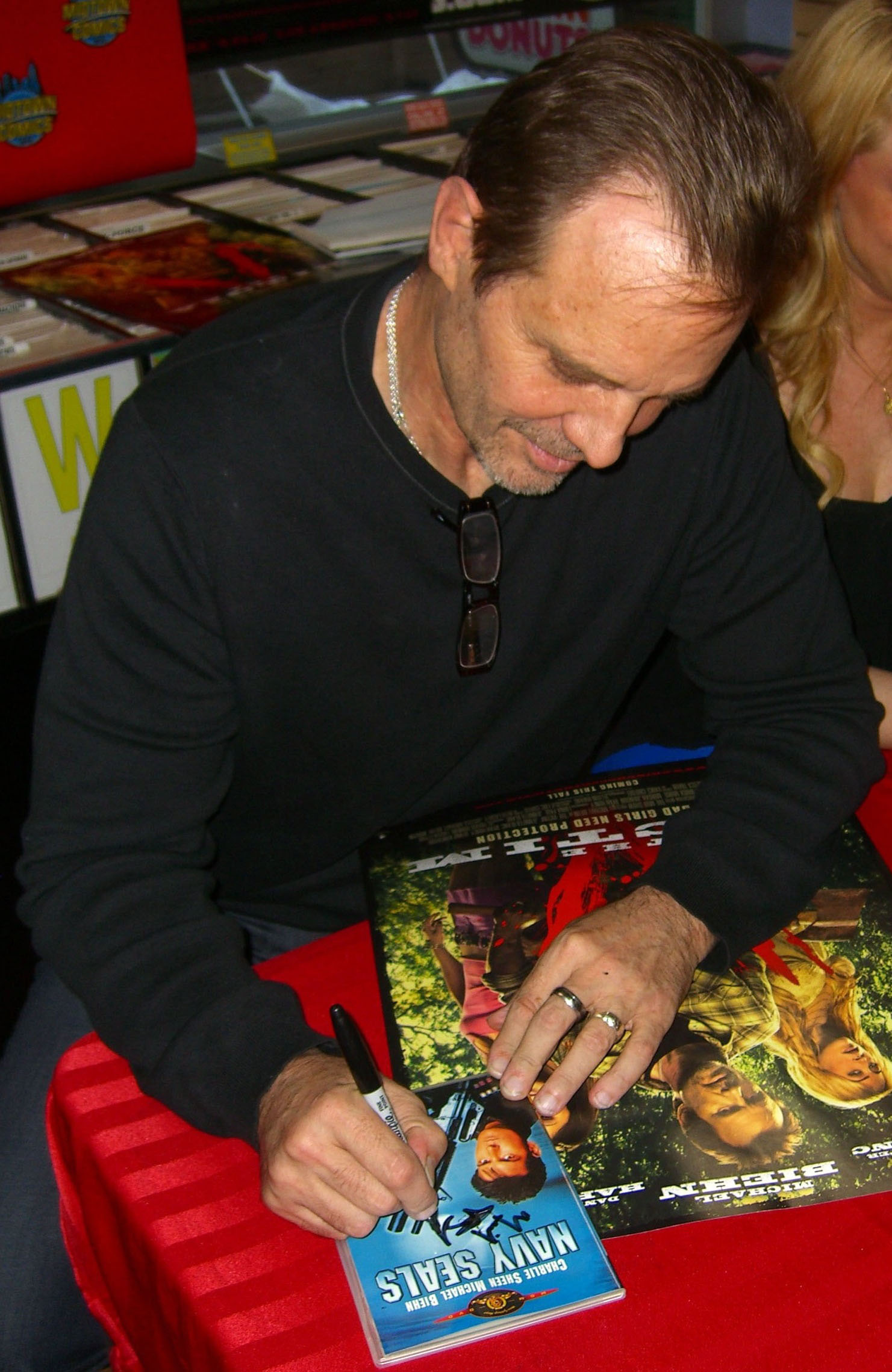
Star Michael Biehn signing a copy of the DVD cover during an August 2012 appearance at Midtown Comics in Manhattan.

- Charlie Sheen as Lieutenant Junior Grade Dale Hawkins, the second in command of the Navy SEAL team.
- Michael Biehn as Lieutenant James Curran, the commander of the Navy SEAL team.
- Joanne Whalley-Kilmer as Claire Varrens
- Rick Rossovich as HM3 (SEAL) James Leary: Corpsman
- Cyril O'Reilly as HT1 (SEAL) Homer Rexer: Explosives
- Bill Paxton as MM2 (SEAL) Floyd "God" Dane: Sniper
- Dennis Haysbert as OSC (SEAL/SW) William "Billy" Graham: Team Chief
- Paul Sanchez as RM3 Ramos: Communications and Arabic interpreter
- Nicholas Kadi as Ben Shaheed
- Ronald G. Joseph as Captain Ryan Dunne: Navy SEAL Commander
- S. Epatha Merkerson as Jolena (a.k.a. Jo), Chief Graham's fiancée
- Gregory McKinney as U.S. Helicopter Pilot
- Rob Moran as U.S. Helicopter Co-Pilot
- Richard Venture as Rear Admiral Colker
- Ron Faber as General Mateen
- Titus Welliver as Redneck in Bar
- Marc Zuber as Villa Hostage

== Production ==
=== Development ===
In the winter of 1986 Brenda Feigen, then an agent at the William Morris Agency, was introduced to Chuck Pfarrer through one of her clients. Pfarrer, an active-duty navy SEAL who wrote screenplays in his spare time, had just sold "The Crook Factory", a script about Ernest Hemingway's life. Feigen encouraged him to write a script based on his experiences. After retiring from the SEALs, Pfarrer wrote the script, which Feigen shopped to Orion Pictures, Warner Brothers, and United Artists, hoping to create a bidding war. Orion ultimately purchased the script, with Feigen acting as producer.

Feigen wanted Ridley Scott to direct, but negotiations fell through. Producers met with Roger Donaldson to see if he was interested in directing, he read the script as a favor to Mike Medavoy, head of Orion, but he didn't like the script, in her memoir, Feigen wrote that the meeting with Donaldson was wasted time.

Richard Marquand was then hired as director, but his death in 1987 stopped pre-production until Lewis Teague was brought in as a replacement. Feigen says Teague had been originally recommended to her by Michael Douglas who had worked with Teague on The Jewel of the Nile. She later wrote, "He neglected to add that Lewis had come on board that movie as they were about to shoot and that he had done whatever Michael wanted throughout." After Marquand's death, Teague was also, coincidentally, proposed as a replacement director by Medavoy, who had been developing another project with Teague that did not go ahead. Feigen watched Jewel of the Nile and Alligator and agreed to hire Teague as director. She later wrote:

He seemed innocuous, not too bright, but eager to make Navy SEAL (as it was still titled). What was odd about even our first conversation was that whenever I said anything, there would be a long silence before Lewis replied. And he had a quizzical look on his face, as though he didn’t quite understand what I was saying. When I spoke with Medavoy the next day, I couldn't articulate any problems I had with Lewis; his movies were okay and Michael Douglas had said he would be good for my movie.

Several screenwriters were brought on to do rewrites. Gary Goldman wrote a new draft with Pfarrer, taking influence from the 1961 film The Guns of Navarone, and the 1982 film An Officer and a Gentleman. Teague disliked this script—Feigen wrote in her memoir, "directors are usually egomaniacs who always want their own script to be the one they shoot. What Teague wanted was for the SEALs to have to get Stinger missiles out of the control of Arab terrorists who were planning to blow up a planeload of innocent civilians."

Kevin Jarre was approached to do a rewrite for Teague, but initially declined due to the 1988 Writer's Strike. Once the strike ended in August 1988, Jarre turned in his draft, which was considered stronger, but the producers had concerns about the script, mainly a line of dialogue that was deemed sexist, the script was also gratuitously violent, and lacking in character depth. Feigen wrote, "Everyone except Lewis had pretty much the same overall reaction to the script. It was exciting, but we wanted to know more about the characters. Lewis seemed unable to understand the criticism, saying that he disagreed but not explaining his reasoning."

Angelo Pizzo was then brought on to flesh out and develop the main characters, according to Pizzo, he worked on the script for two months, writing many drafts, going to the training grounds where the Navy SEALs trained, and going on location scouts with Teague in Spain and Israel, as well as meeting with the main cast.

Rewrites continued well into production, with uncredited script doctors and even actors Charlie Sheen and Michael Biehn reportedly rewriting scenes. "The more involved we got the worse we realized the script was," said Sheen later. Ultimately, only Pfarrer and Goldman received credit on the final film.

The actors underwent a two-week training course in Northern Virginia, taking part in field maneuvers and weapons training. Eight former Navy SEALs were hired as technical advisors to train the actors and occasionally perform stunts.

Feigen's relationship with Teague broke down during pre production and never recovered. He refused to let her come on location.

=== Filming ===
Principal photography began on 18 September 1989 in Virginia Beach and near Naval Station Norfolk, in Norfolk, Virginia.

In November 1989, filming moved to Southern Spain, utilizing the Mediterranean ports of Tarifa, Cádiz, and Cartagena. The Spanish Navy provided submarines, battleships and helicopters, whereas the Spanish Army provided tanks, APCs and background actors. Chosen because of its Moorish Revival architecture, Cartagena's old inner city stood in for war-torn Beirut, Lebanon. Teague used up to seven camera crews filming simultaneously in several action scenes.

Lewis Teague said "There's a lot of comparison to military movies like Top Gun but this one has a harder edge."

Feigen wrote "Lewis had insisted on a director of photography of his choosing, and the scenes were dull and lifeless." She claims Orion wanted to replace Teague but instead the studio wound up replacing the director of photography with John Alonzo. She claims "It sounded as though the cast and crew were about to mutiny. At one point, I heard that Lewis had lost total control. Lewis was largely being ignored. People were doing their jobs without his direction."

During previews Feigen says she and Orion executives saw a new ending that had been devised by Teague for the first time, "and were all shocked by it. Honoring the main Arab terrorist, thousands of Arabs chanted anti-American bullshit as his corpse was carried on a platform, raised above their heads, through the streets of Beirut. We couldn't figure out what Lewis's political message was, nor did we care. It was an almost unanimous decision — Lewis was the only dissenting vote — that the scene was out and one of the other three possible endings that they’d shot would be substituted."

== Reception ==
=== Release ===
Navy SEALs was released in theaters on July 20, 1990.

=== Box office ===
The film was not a box office success, debuting at No. 4 and grossing $6.5 million the first week, eventually grossing $25 million domestically, just barely above its reported budget of $21 million.

=== Critical response ===
The film received negative reviews from critics. At the review aggregator website Rotten Tomatoes, the film holds a 15% "Rotten" rating, based on 39 critics' reviews, which are summarized thus: "a non-winning military recruitment propaganda movie that happens to star Charlie Sheen and Michael Biehn". Some reviews have been more positive: Allmovie notes that "viewers seeking rapidly paced action sequences will not be disappointed". The film received three out of four stars on UK Virgin Television.

The film was more successful on home video with a VHS released on January 31, 1991. A Blu-ray was released in 2009 in the United States.

In 2024, boutique movie label Vinegar Syndrome released a fully restored Ultra HD Blu-ray featuring an all new 4K scan of the original 35mm camera negative. It also features a brand new commentary track by film historians Jim Hemphill and Kelly Goodner.

Michael Biehn expressed his dislike of the film in a 2012 interview: "We wanted to make a really good movie, and it really turned out to be kind of a mish-mash and not a very good movie at all. So it's really kind of... yeah, it's probably the worst experience of my life, working on that movie... The script could've been shaped to be much better, and you just hate to see all that talent and passion go to waste".

The film is lampooned in Clerks, when the character Randall complains about video store customers who "always pick the most intellectually devoid movies on the racks" and one is shown reacting excitedly to a tape of Navy SEALs.

== Other media ==
=== Video game ===
A shoot 'em up platform video game developed and published by Ocean Software was released in the United Kingdom for the Amstrad CPC, GX4000 and Commodore 64 in 1990. It was later re-released in the rest of Europe for the ZX Spectrum, Atari ST and Amiga home computers in the following year. It was then ported to the Game Boy on 1 September 1991 in the United States. The game is based on the film and follows the protagonist, Lieutenant Dale Hawkins, progressing through five side-scrolling levels.

== See also ==
- List of films featuring the United States Navy SEALs

== General and cited references ==
- Feigen, Brenda (2000). Not One of the Boys: Living Life as a Feminist. New York: Alfred A. Knopf. ISBN 9780679408420. OCLC 44997590.
