= Flash Traffic: City of Angels =

1994 interactive movie video game

- Developer: Tsunami Games
- Publisher: Time Warner Interactive
- Platform: MS-DOS
- Release: 1994
- Genre: Interactive movie
- Mode: Single-player

Flash Traffic: City of Angels is an interactive movie video game developed by Tsunami Games and published by Time Warner Interactive in 1994 for MS-DOS.

== Gameplay ==
When a scene ends, players are given three choices on how to proceed. They impact the story and gameplay, but the wrong choice does not usually end the game. Some choices can result in the player's death.

== Plot ==
Drug Enforcement Administration agents hit a warehouse, where they kill two people and arrest three suspects. They believed the warehouse only contained drugs, but find the materials to make a nuclear bomb. The player is tasked to find out who made the bomb, retrieve it and defuse it before it destroys the Northern Hemisphere.

== Release ==
Tsunami Games debuted the game at COMDEX in November 1994.

== Reception ==
Entertainment Weekly rated it C+: "An uninspiring script and so-so acting make Flash Traffic play like a direct-to-video cheapie with a multiple-personality disorder." Stephen Manes of The New York Times called it "stronger on acting and dialogue than on plot". Manes said some choices do not seem to affect the plot, making it unsatisfying.
