= Virus: It Is Aware =

1999 video game

Virus: It is Aware
- Developer: Cryo Interactive
- Publisher: Cryo Interactive
- Platform: PlayStation
- Release: EU: June 1999
- Genres: Action, horror
- Mode: Single-player

Virus: It is Aware is a 1999 action-horror video game developed and published by French video game developer Cryo Interactive. It was released on PlayStation in Europe, and localised for France, the UK, Germany, Spain and Italy. The game is a tie-in for the 1999 comic book film Virus based on the comic book from Dark Horse Comics.

Like the film it was based on, the game was met with negative reception.

== Gameplay ==
The game is a survival-horror action title, similar to the popular PlayStation game Resident Evil. The player guides the character, Joan, from a third-person viewpoint (by default the camera is placed behind Joan, but it is adjustable), through eleven levels in which she confronts forty types of hostile creatures, including five bosses, using nine different weapons.

Special passwords can be used to access levels without playing all the way up to them.

== Plot ==
Loosely based on the film (and in turn, the comic book), the game is about an alien electrical life-form (usually referred to as "the Evil") which hijacks a space station, beams itself down to a ship called The Electra and plans to take over the world. To do so, it killed the ship crew and outfitted them with implants to infiltrate the human race. Unlike in the film, the ship makes it to port and the cyborg monsters infest the "Nakomi hotel". This divergence from the film was due to Cryo Interactive believing that a game set entirely on a boat would be too limited. A female police officer and specialist in criminology, Joan Averil, is sent in to investigate "strange events" along with her partner Sutter. They discover the monsters, and fight their way through, rescuing two civilians on the way. Yakuza criminals also appear as enemies on the way. As reports of strange activity on The Electra surfaces, they track the infestation down to the ship and board it. Joan reveals that her brother Thomas works on the ship, and hopes to find him. They do, but Sutter is killed. They eventually manage to blow up the ship and escape. The ending cinematic ominously zooms out to depict the infested space station.

The back insert blurb of the game states "The virus has arrived on earth to destroy the human race. This time bullets will be used to cure evil." In the native French, it says that bullets will have to be used.

== Reception ==
In testing a beta version of the game on Jeuxvideo.com in July 1999, Kornifex gave it an overall score of 8 out of 20, mostly criticizing the very poor handling of the character, the ugly graphics (cutscenes aside), bad music, and technical shortcomings. The review concluded, "Briefly, virus is far, very far from being finished. The final version just came out. I really hope it has been redesigned from the ground up for nothing portends a good game."

OPM UK stated that the most enlightening aspects of the game were those that were missing "There's no sidestep or roll, no strafing of any kind, no sniper mode, no aiming up or down" and gave the game a 4 out of 10.

Upon release, these issues were essentially unchanged and the game received mediocre to poor reviews. The French magazine Consoles + gave it a 5 out of 10 (52%), while Joypad and PlayStation Magazine gave it only 1 out of 10. In June 2010, the French Internet game reviewer Frédéric Molas lambasted the game on his show Le Joueur du Grenier.
