= Virus (comics) =

1992 comic book by Pfarrer and Cobb

- Virus #1 (December 1992)

Publication information
- Publisher: Dark Horse Comics
- Publication date: 1992

Creative team
- Written by: Chuck Pfarrer
- Artist: Howard Cobb

Virus is a Dark Horse Comics comic book, written by Chuck Pfarrer, drawn by Canadian artist Howard Cobb and first published in 1992. The story is about an alien life form which takes over a Chinese Navy research vessel and reconfigures it—using both the damaged electronics and the dead bodies of the crew, it propagates itself by making various "creatures" created out of both organic and inorganic parts. When a salvage ship shows up they have to deal with the life form or be taken over as well.

Pfarrer said in an interview that when he wrote the original story as a script in the early 1990s, the special effects for a film adaptation wouldn't have been possible, so he sold the script to Dark Horse as a comic. It was adapted into the 1999 science fiction horror film Virus, directed by John Bruno.

== History ==
Chuck Pfarrer initially wrote Virus as a screenplay and pitched it to Universal Pictures who rejected Pfarrer's pitch. Pfarrer, liking the underlying concept, contacted Mike Richardson of Dark Horse Comics, for whom Pfarrer had previously written a comic book sequel to John Carpenter's The Thing titled The Thing from Another World. Richardson agreed to publish Virus as a comic book miniseries, which was a great success with all four issues attaining sales of 100,000 copies per issue. Pfarrer then took Virus to producer Gale Anne Hurd and the two of them returned to Universal who were now eager to do the film.

== Collected editions ==
- Dark Horse Comics, June 1995, ISBN 1-56971-104-6
