= Police Quest: Open Season =

1993 video game

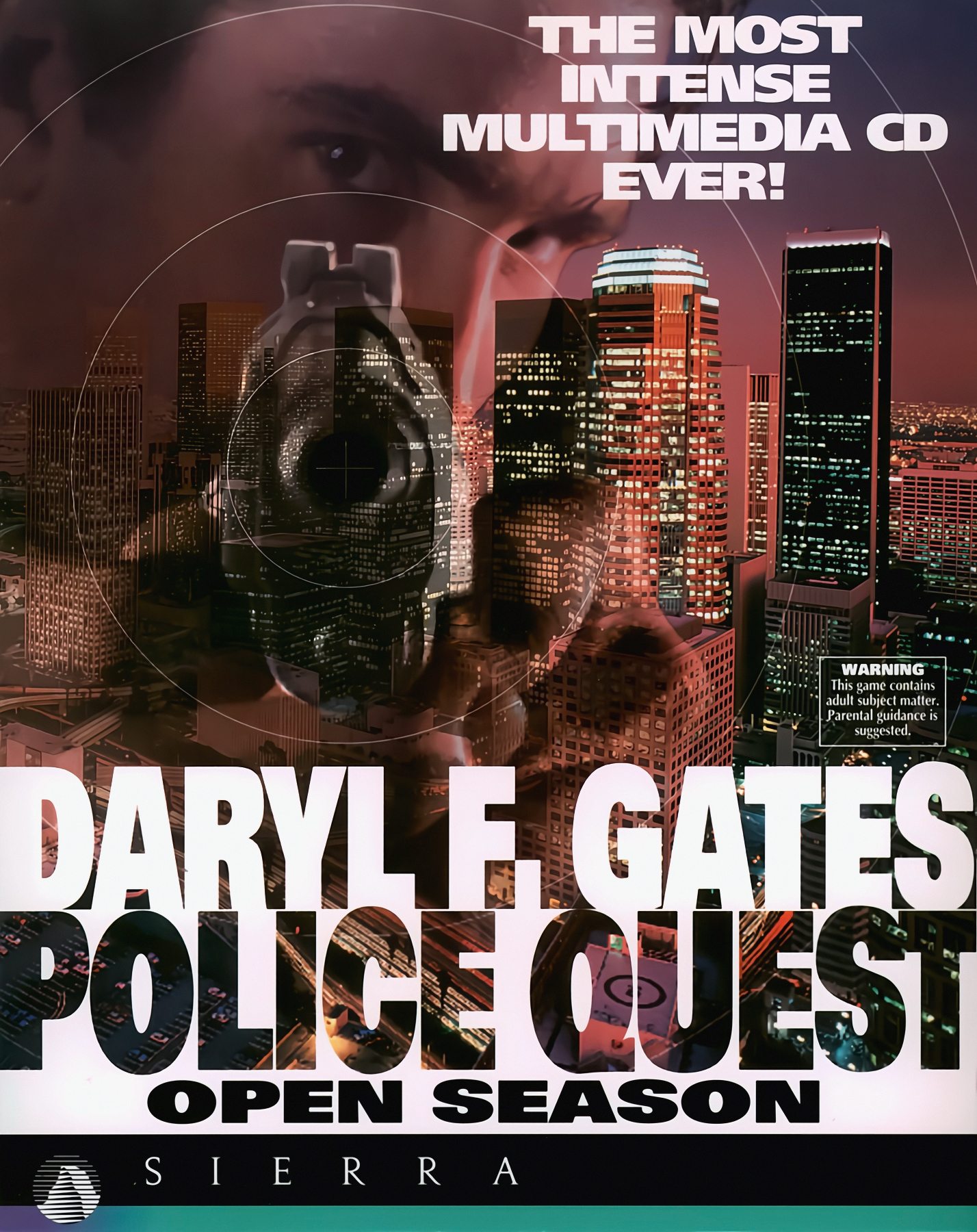
- Developer: Sierra On-Line
- Publisher: Sierra On-Line
- Director: Tammy Dargan
- Producer: Tammy Dargan
- Designer: Tammy Dargan
- Programmer: Doug Oldfield
- Artist: Darrin Fuller
- Writer: Tammy Dargan
- Composer: Neal Grandstaff
- Series: Police Quest
- Engine: SCI
- Platforms: MS-DOS, Windows, Mac OS
- Release: November 1993
- Genre: Adventure
- Mode: Single-player

Police Quest: Open Season (also known as Police Quest IV (Note: The game is listed as Police Quest 4 (PQ4) in the manual. It is also shown in the file names and the credits, and when exiting the game in DOS, "Thank you for playing Police Quest IV: Open Season". The number does not appear on the title screen.)) is a 1993 police procedural point-and-click adventure video game developed and published by Sierra On-Line. It is the fourth installment in the Police Quest series. Departing from the fictional setting of Lytton, California from the first three installments, Open Season follows police detective John Carey as he investigates a series of brutal murders in Los Angeles.

The game was produced in cooperation with former Los Angeles Police Department (LAPD) chief Daryl F. Gates, who had been recently ousted for his involvement in the 1992 Los Angeles Riots. Gates replaced former series director and ex-California Highway Patrol officer Jim Walls, who left Sierra around 1991. Sierra employee Tammy Dargan wrote and designed most of the game.

Open Season received mixed reviews and underperformed compared to previous entries. Since release, the game has been criticized as a racist and "reactionary" depiction of crime in Los Angeles.

An updated CD-ROM version was released in 1994; the updated version replaced on-screen text with recorded audio and also provided additional animations, music, and arcade sequences. An indirect sequel and spinoff, Police Quest: SWAT, was released in 1995.

== Gameplay ==
Open Season uses mouse-based point-and-click gameplay similar to the previous Police Quest III and other contemporary adventure games. Icons for actions such as "walking" and "speaking" are used rather than a text-parsing system as seen in the first two Police Quest games. The player uses these actions to interact with characters and investigate crime scenes.

Like previous Police Quest games, Open Season emphasizes the following of "realistic" police procedure and will penalize the player for failing to do so. The player will suffer negative consequences for violating protocol, failing to file paperwork, or committing sexual harassment.

The game features full-motion video, with much of the imagery based on video recordings of actors or real photographs of Los Angeles. The 1994 CD version replaces in-game written text with audio narration.

== Plot ==
LAPD robbery-homicide detective John Carey is dispatched to investigate a homicide in a South Central alleyway. Carey finds his best friend and ex-partner Bob Hickman dead alongside an eight-year-old boy. Carey investigates the murder as a gang killing, but over time five more victims are found mutilated in public places and Carey learns the crimes are the work of a serial killer.

Carey's investigation eventually leads to a local movie theater. After being questioned, the theater owner gives Carey a cup of tea and a free movie ticket. Carey passes out while watching the movie and has a vision of the theater owner dressed in women's clothing. Carey wakes up and is thrown out by the owner.

Later, with the aid of a stray dog, Carey discovers the serial killer's house and a secret passage leading to the movie theater. While investigating the movie theater, Carey witnesses the killer kidnapping an unconscious woman while dressed as a woman himself. Carey pursues him but the killer knocks Carey unconscious.

Carey later wakes up in the killer's house, at this point connecting that the theater owner and serial killer are the same person. Carey assembles a makeshift flamethrower, incinerates the killer, and rescues the woman. The game ends with the Los Angeles mayor presenting Carey with the LAPD Medal of Valor.

== Development ==
Open Season was the first entry in the Police Quest series to be developed without former series designer Jim Walls, who left Sierra due to undisclosed circumstances. The game was developed in Sierra's SCI engine.

Although Gates' name was on the cover, and he is listed as the game's "author", Open Season was largely written and designed by Sierra employee Tammy Dargan. Dargan had previously written for the television show America's Most Wanted and received some notes from Gates. Gates claims to have not written the game's storyline and said its depictions were not his idea. Dargan has defended herself by stating the African American dialogue was based on Fab Five Freddy's rap dictionary Fresh Fly Flavor, a claim that has been called "highly dubious".

Sierra had three box designs in consideration for the game: A bloody hand reaching for the title, a file folder, and the Los Angeles city skyline. The company had a focus group vote on them, and the file folder design garnered almost no votes, with the other two covers splitting the majority. The final decision was reached because parents in the focus group often had a negative side comment about the bloody hand design, so the skyline cover eventually won. The game was released in November 1993.

Whereas previous Police Quest installments included a police procedure handbook that functioned as a proper game manual with relevant gameplay information, Open Season included an actual LAPD policy handbook that, while informative, focused more on LAPD resources such as radio codes, uniform dress, and legal regulations, but largely lacked information that would be relevant in the actual game.

The 1994 CD release of the game included audio dialogue, a two-minute promotional video, and copies of official LAPD documents.

== Reception ==
Reception

Review scores
Publication	Score
Adventure Gamers	2/5
Next Generation	2/5
Electronic Games	B+
White Wolf	Very Good
White Wolf Inphobia	4/5

=== Contemporary ===
Open Season received mixed reviews on release, with some critics positively highlighting the game's adherence to detailed police procedure.

The narrative and writing divided opinions. Computer Gaming World credited the game for "magnificently" telling a story "about class warfare and poverty". Electronic Games noted that some players may find the subject matter "disturbing". Other contemporary writers criticized the game for its depiction of Black Americans. Writing in the Journal of African American Men in 1997, Randolph G. Potts argued that Open Season was a "particularly disturbing example" of stereotypes that Black men are more likely to be dangerous criminals. Potts also criticized the game's "Amos 'n Andy-style speech of its African American suspects".

Gameplay likewise split reviewers. The focus on realistic police duty minutiae and paperwork was praised by Electronic Games, which called the experience "rewarding and eye-opening". Next Generation was frustrated by inconsistent consequences to player misdeeds and concluded that "the ultimate Sierra police-based game is still a fond dream to look forward to". James V. Trunzo of White Wolf described the game as leaving no room for mistakes. "If you don't enjoy meticulous attention to detail, you're going to hate this game", he stated, also noting that the game's author Daryl F. Gates brought to ensure the game's realism was "famous (or infamous, depending upon your perspective)".

The game's photorealistic graphics and "moody, evocative" score were praised by Computer Gaming World. Trunzo stated that "I really enjoyed the disk version of the game, and I believe the CD-ROM version is better...The use of multimedia techniques simply enhances the vicarious experience."

=== Retrospective ===
Open Season has received even more negative appraisal in retrospective reviews, with writers criticizing its game design and its characterization of life in Los Angeles. In 2013, Adventure Gamers gave the game 2 out of 5 stars, arguing that the game cared more about "technical features, and not its story or gameplay." The reviewer highlights "banal" dialogue, "ethnic clichés", and illogical and "haphazard" puzzles.

Even more strongly, a Vice retrospective written by Duncan Fyfe in 2018 called Open Season "the most reactionary game of the 90s", alleging that Gates was brought onto the project to generate "controversy" and therefore media attention. Fyfe concludes that the game encapsulates Gates' "violent, racist, paramilitary vision of American policing".

== Sales ==
The first four Police Quest games totaled 850,000 sales by late 1995. However, Markus Krichel of PC Games noted that "interest on the part of the gamer fell slightly" with Open Season (Mainly due to the absence of creator Jim Walls, and those who did play the game weren't happy playing as anyone besides the classic series's protagonist Sonny Bonds), which led Sierra On-Line to experiment with a new direction for the series with Police Quest: SWAT. According to Sierra, combined sales of the Police Quest series—including SWAT—surpassed 1.2 million units by the end of March 1996.

== See also ==
- Blue Force
