= Codename: ICEMAN =

1990 video game

- Box art
- Developer: Sierra On-Line
- Publisher: Sierra On-Line
- Designer: Jim Walls
- Composer: Mark Seibert
- Engine: SCI
- Platforms: MS-DOS, Amiga, Atari ST
- Release: March 1990
- Genres: Adventure game, partially submarine simulator
- Mode: Single-player

Codename: ICEMAN (Note: The game's title is styled in various ways, such as CODE-NAME: ICEMAN on the front box art, Codename: Iceman on the back box art, and CODE NAME: ICEMAN on the game's title screen) (pronounced as "Iceman") is a graphical adventure game made with the SCI engine and published by the American computer game company Sierra On-Line in 1990. The lead designer was Jim Walls, who also created several Police Quest games.

ICEMAN involves a near-future political conspiracy involving the United States, the Soviet Union, and Tunisia. One of the game's notable features is that a large portion takes place in a detailed simulation of a submarine, requiring the player to manage the navigation and weapons systems of the fictional USS Blackhawk.

Mention of a "Codename: PHOENIX" in Sierra promotional material suggests that ICEMAN was meant to be the first part of a series, but disappointing sales ended the would-be franchise after one game.

== Plot ==
The story takes place during a future global oil shortage, when Tunisia is discovered to possess a surplus of high-grade oil. While the Soviet and US governments try to acquire as much of the oil as they can, Soviet-backed terrorists kidnap a US ambassador in hopes of provoking an international incident.

Naval officer Johnny Westland is informed about the situation while on leave in Tahiti and is called back for the rescue mission. The night before returning to duty, he meets a woman named Stacy and has a one-night stand.

In the Pentagon, Westland is briefed and learns that Stacy is also an agent whom he must meet as soon as he reaches his goal. To reach his target, Westland travels in a nuclear-powered submarine, the USS Blackhawk. Westland battles Soviet vessels, navigates an iceberg field, and plants bombs to penetrate the harbor surveillance of Tunisia.

In Tunisia, Westland meets Stacy disguised as a local. They kill the terrorists holding the ambassador hostage and escape in a van. After leaving Tunisia, Westland is promoted and proposes to Stacy.

== Gameplay ==
Codename: ICEMAN is a text parser-based adventure game. Commands must be typed, such as CLIMB UP to ascend a ladder. The interface features some technical innovations for Sierra games, such as shortcutting some inputs (typing LOOK while near an object instead of needing to type LOOK OBJECT) and allowing certain actions to be performed with a mouse.

Within the game's "setting of espionage and intrigue," players must also master a variety of detailed procedural tasks. These tasks include learning Navy terminology, decoding encrypted messages, and correctly administering CPR. These procedural tasks require regular referencing of the game's included manual. A dice game also features prominently, requiring the player to defeat submarine crew in a game of chance.

== Reception and legacy ==
Codename: ICEMAN received mixed reviews at release and has received more negative reviews in retrospect. Some contemporary reviewers were very positive. The reviewer for Games International scored it 10 out of 10 and called it "the most sophisticated adventure game I have ever played."

Computer Gaming World stated the submarine simulation was exciting and also credited lead artist Sheryl Lloyd's work: "Aesthetically, the game has much to commend it." Composer Mark Selbert's score was also credited as "spectacular."

Other reviewers stated ICEMAN needed "a little more polish." The reviewer for CU Amiga criticized the game's awkward text parser and argued its focus on procedural details is "dull" and "pedantic."

For a retrospective review in 2007, Adventure Gamers harshly criticized the game, calling it "mundane" and unmemorable. The protagonist Johnny Westland is described as having "the personality of a magazine cut-out" and the gameplay as frustrating, confusing, and "tiresome."

In 2024, a fanmade parody prequel titled KIDNAME: ICEBOY was released, featuring Johnny Westland as a young boy.
