= Blue Force =

1993 video game

- Developer: Tsunami Games
- Publisher: Tsunami Games
- Designer: Jim Walls
- Composer: Ken Allen
- Engine: TsAGE
- Platform: MS-DOS
- Release: 1993
- Genre: Adventure
- Mode: Single-player

Blue Force is a 1993 point-and-click adventure game for MS-DOS, developed and published by Tsunami Games. It was designed by Jim Walls, known for creating the Police Quest series, with music composed by Ken Allen. The game follows Jake Ryan, a rookie police officer investigating the unsolved murder of his father while uncovering a gun smuggling ring.

Blue Force received mixed to negative reviews upon release. Computer Gaming World criticized it as weaker than Walls' previous work and in 1996 ranked it the 37th-worst computer game ever made.

== Plot ==
In 1995, Jake Ryan is a rookie police officer. Jake's father was a police officer, which prompted Jake to join the force. Jake's father was killed in the line of duty in 1984 and his case has not yet been solved. While playing the game, Jake uncovers clues to his father's murder.

Jake graduates at the top of his class and joins the Jackson Beach PD, the same force his dad was on. He makes several arrests in connection with a National Guard armory break-in. Just as he is about to tie these crimes in with his father's murder, Jake is in a car accident while riding his police motorcycle. After spending weeks in rehab, his father's old partner offers him a job as his assistant in his private investigation firm, and Jake accepts. Eventually, the two discover a massive gun smuggling ring, tied to three main individuals: a man named Bradford Green, Stuart Cox, the Jackson Beach district attorney, and Nico Dillon, the person who murdered Jake's father. The game ends with Nico being sentenced to receive a lethal injection, Bradford Green being sentenced to 20 years in prison, and Stuart Cox being sentenced to 15 years in prison.

== Reception ==
Reception

Aggregate score
Aggregator	Score
GameRankings	40% (1 review)

Review scores
Publication	Score
Adventure Classic Gaming	2/5
Electronic Games	85%

Computer Gaming World's Charles Ardai in 1993 stated that Blue Force "is simply not as strong as Walls' previous games". He criticized the game world ("prop-up facades"), "abysmal" dialogues, "appalling spelling errors and factual inconsistencies", and slow speed. Ardai concluded that "Walls and Tsunami both have better work in them ... they have nowhere to go but up". PC Format's 1993 review complained about restrictive progression often requiring trial and error and about repetitive bureaucracy. In the conclusion "some good sequences and average graphics" were outweighed by "clicking on the mouse to keep the conversation moving, too many sudden deaths, a storyline that's way too tight, sterile unpopulated settings, characters walking at a snail's pace and no apparent logic in some situations".

In 1996, Computer Gaming World declared Blue Force the 37th-worst computer game ever released.

The game shipped 20,000 units in its first month.

== See also ==
- Codename: ICEMAN, another game designed by Jim Walls
