= Gary Goldman (screenwriter) =

American screenwriter

Gary Leon Goldman (born 17 September 1953) is an American screenwriter. His film credits include Big Trouble in Little China (1986), Total Recall (1990) and Navy SEALs (1990).

== Career ==
Goldman's first big screen writing credit was for John Carpenter's fantasy martial arts film Big Trouble in Little China, which he co-wrote with David Weinstein. Originally set in the old west, the script was later adapted by Carpenter's former classmate at USC film school, W. D. Richter, to take place in modern times.

Goldman's next major writing job came in 1989 for the science fiction action film Total Recall, starring Arnold Schwarzenegger. Originally written by Ronald Shusett and Dan O'Bannon, director Paul Verhoeven had problems with the third act and hired Goldman to help fix the screenplay. According to the director, the problem was that the last forty minutes of the film was one long action sequence and had abandoned the "mental theme." Working with Shusett, Goldman was able to reintroduce this mental theme by adding a plot twist where the audience discovers that Schwarzenegger's character, who is assumed to be a good guy, had his memory wiped and is actually a bad guy.

Shortly after the success of Total Recall, Goldman and Shusett co-wrote a screen adaptation of Philip K. Dick's story "The Minority Report" to serve as a possible sequel to the film. Although their screenplay was not used, the 2002 film Minority Report has a sequence set in a car factory, which was adapted from their early script. In the end, Goldman didn't receive a writing credit, but was listed as an executive producer of the film.

By 2003, Goldman's career had slowed down, and manager Lenny Beckerman suggested that he adapt another Philip K. Dick story. Goldman had a good relationship with the Dick estate and was able to acquire the rights to his 1954 short story "The Golden Man". The completed script was sold to Nicolas Cage's production company, Saturn Films, and eventually became the 2007 film Next directed by Lee Tamahori and starring Cage, along with Julianne Moore and Jessica Biel. Unfortunately, the film was not a great critical or financial success.

== Lawsuit ==
On March 21, 2017, Goldman filed a copyright infringement lawsuit against Disney over the film Zootopia. According to the suit, Goldman pitched a concept to Disney for a live-action film titled Looney, centered around an animator's creation of a TV cartoon called Zootopia. Goldman twice pitched the concept, featuring the same title, in 2000 and 2009. Disney began pre-production on a film titled Zootopia — a term never having previously appeared in Disney's creative work — in 2013. Disney's film centered on a theme that the lawsuit alleged to be similar to Goldman's initial pitch, depicting a society of animals who could "pursue their dreams no matter their species." Goldman's suit alleged that the company had reproduced the name, themes, settings, and character tropes offered in his pitch. Goldman also filed graphics of concept artwork of characters claimed to have been appropriated by Disney's character portrayals, including Nick Wilde, Flash, Chief Bogo, and Judy Hopps (appearing in Goldman's pitch as a squirrel modeled after his wife, Judith).

U.S. District Judge Michael W. Fitzgerald dismissed the infringement claims on November 8, 2017. As stated in the final review, "...Goldman's effort to make the plots of Looney and Zootopia seem similar were strained. All the purported similarities between the two works were themes, not plot points or sequences of events, that were too general to be protected by copyright law."

Goldman appealed to the U.S. Court of Appeals for the Ninth Circuit, where it affirmed the lower court's dismissal, finding that "[the Walt Disney Company] may have copied the idea of a zoo-utopia but their expression of that idea bears almost no resemblance to Plaintiff’s expression".
