= Tsunami Games =

Video game publisher

- Founded: 1991
- Founder: Ed Heinbockel
- Defunct: 1999
- Number of employees: 35 (1992)

Tsunami Games (or Tsunami Media, Inc.) was an American video game developer and publisher founded in 1991 by former employees of Sierra Entertainment (then known as Sierra On-Line).The company was based in Oakhurst, California, which at the time was also the home of Sierra. Between 1992 and 1996 Tsunami published several games, most notably adventure games and interactive movies, before becoming defunct.

== History ==
Tsunami Games was formed in 1991 by Ed Heinbockel, former chief financial officer of Sierra On-Line.

== List of games ==
- Wacky Funsters! The Geekwad's Guide to Gaming (1992, re-released on CD in 1993)
- The Geekwad: Games of The Galaxy (1992, re-released on CD in 1993)
- Ringworld: Revenge of the Patriarch (1993)
- Blue Force (1993)
- Protostar: War on the Frontier (1993)
- Man Enough (1993)
- Return to Ringworld (1994)
- Flash Traffic: City of Angels (1994)
- Silent Steel (1995)
- Free Enterprise (or Free Enterpri$e) (1996)
