= Virus (1999 film) =

1999 science fiction-horror film directed by John Bruno

- Theatrical release poster
- Directed by: John Bruno
- Written by: Dennis Feldman; Chuck Pfarrer; Jonathan Hensleigh (uncredited)
- Based on: Virus by: Chuck Pfarrer
- Produced by: Gale Anne Hurd
- Starring: Jamie Lee Curtis; Donald Sutherland; William Baldwin; Joanna Pacuła; Marshall Bell
- Cinematography: David Eggby
- Edited by: Scott Smith
- Music by: Joel McNeely
- Production companies: Dark Horse Entertainment; Mutual Film Company; Valhalla Motion Pictures
- Distributed by: Universal Pictures
- Release date: January 15, 1999
- Running time: 99 minutes
- Country: United States
- Languages: English; Russian
- Budget: $75 million
- Box office: $30.7 million

Virus is a 1999 American science fiction horror film directed by visual effects artist John Bruno and starring Jamie Lee Curtis, William Baldwin and Donald Sutherland. Based on the comic book of the same name by Chuck Pfarrer, it tells the story of a ship beset by a malevolent extraterrestrial entity that seeks to turn humanity into cyborg slaves. Virus was released by Universal Pictures on January 15, 1999. The film was promoted with a line of action figures and a tie-in video game. It turned out to be a critical and commercial flop by grossing $30.7 million against a $75 million budget, with Curtis herself calling it one of the worst films she has ever been in, but has made a cult following.

== Plot ==
Akademik Vladislav Volkov, a Russian research vessel in the South Pacific, communicates with the orbiting space station Mir. An energy source traveling through space strikes Mir, killing the cosmonauts and beaming itself down to Volkov. The electrical surge takes over the ship and attacks the crew.

Seven days later, the tugboat Sea Star, captained by alcoholic Robert Everton, loses its uninsured cargo while sailing through a typhoon. Sea Star's crew discover the engine room taking on water. When Sea Star takes refuge in the eye of the storm to make repairs, Volkov appears on their radar. Realizing that it could be worth millions in salvage, Everton orders his crew aboard.

On Volkov, most of the electronics have been destroyed and the Russian crew are seemingly missing. Everton orders Sea Star's navigator and ex-Navy officer Kelly Foster to help a fellow crewman, Squeaky, restore power to the ship. The ship's anchor then drops on its own, sinking Sea Star with deckhand Hiko and first mate J.W. Woods Jr. on board. Sea Star's engineer Steve Baker leaves Squeaky to guard the engine room, where a robotic creature lures him to his death. Steve rescues an injured Hiko, while Woods comes out unscathed.

As Foster treats Hiko in the sick bay, Chief Science Officer Nadia Vinogradova, the sole surviving member of Volkov's crew, shoots at the crew before Steve subdues her. Nadia is hysterical about "it" needing power to travel through the ship and implores the crew to shut down the generators. She attacks Everton and Foster, who subdue her and take her to the bridge. Steve, Woods, and crewman Richie Mason look for Squeaky in the engine room but instead stumble upon an automated workshop producing more robots.

The three are attacked by the robots and what appears to be a gun-wielding Russian crew member. The Russian is revealed to be a cyborg, but the three bring it down with salvaged munitions from Volkov's small arms locker and take its seemingly dead body to the bridge. Nadia explains that the sentient electrical energy beamed from the Mir took over the ship eight days prior, scanned the ship's computers to find information on killing humans, then used the automated workshops to convert Volkov's crew into cyborgs; the one brought to the bridge was the ship's captain and Nadia's husband.

As the storm resumes, the crew head for the computer room. En route, they are ambushed by a converted Squeaky and a giant robot that kills Woods. The survivors barricade themselves in the communications room. Richie sends out a mayday, but Everton shoots out the radio, unwilling to give up his salvage. Foster punches Everton and removes him from command. Richie uses the computers to talk to the alien; (Note: Credited as The Intelligence in the novelization of the film.) it says that it is "aware" and sees mankind as a "virus" which it plans to use as "spare parts." This drives Richie insane, causing him to gun down Squeaky and flee. When the remaining crew leave the room, Everton talks to the alien, which recognizes him as the "dominant lifeform."

The crew discovers that the alien has moved Volkov's computer elsewhere in the ship. Realizing that Volkov is moving, they return to the bridge by going outside, where Hiko is lost to the typhoon. Meanwhile, Everton is guided to one of the workshops, where he makes a bargain with the alien. Foster identifies Lord Howe Island as Volkov's destination, with Nadia surmising that the alien wishes to seize a British intelligence station from which it could seize control of the world's military forces. As they decide to sink Volkov, the survivors are confronted by the now-cyborg Everton, which they defeat with a thermite hand grenade. They empty Volkov's fuel tanks and set explosive charges.

Foster, Steve and Nadia run into Richie. A giant robot (piloted by the alien) then appears and attacks the trio. The alien captures Foster and tortures her for the detonator's location. A mortally wounded Richie informs Steve that he prepared a jury-rigged ejection seat that can be used for escape. Nadia and Steve rescue Foster, and Nadia sacrifices herself by shooting a flaregun at nearby gas tanks to kill the alien; however, it is only damaged by the explosion and pursues the survivors. Foster and Steve use Richie's ejection seat, escaping the robot form, which triggers pin grenades causing an explosion of the missile bomb and sinks Volkov, causing the sentient electricity to disperse in the seawater. A U.S. naval ship later rescues Foster and Steve.

== Cast ==
- Jamie Lee Curtis as Kelly "Kit" Foster
- William Baldwin as Steve Baker
- Donald Sutherland as Captain Robert Everton
- Joanna Pacuła as Nadia Vinogradova
- Marshall Bell as J.W. Woods Jr.
- Sherman Augustus as Richie Mason
- Cliff Curtis as Hiko
- Julio Oscar Mechoso as "Squeaky"
- Yuri Chervotin as Colonel Kominsky
- Keith Flippen as Captain Lonya Rostov
- Levan Uchaneishvili as Alexi Vinogradov

== Production ==
Chuck Pfarrer initially wrote Virus as a screenplay and pitched it to Universal Pictures who rejected Pfarrer's pitch. Pfarrer, liking the underlying concept, contacted Mike Richardson of Dark Horse Comics, for whom Pfarrer had previously written a comic book sequel to John Carpenter's The Thing titled The Thing from Another World. Richardson agreed to publish Virus as a comic book miniseries, which was a great success with all four issues attaining sales of 100,000 copies per issue. Pfarrer then took Virus to producer Gale Anne Hurd and the two of them returned to Universal who were now eager to do the film. It was observed that the Dark Horse Comics affiliation of Virus was likely a major selling point for the studio after the box office success of The Mask which had also been adapted from a Dark Horse property.

After co-directing parts of T2-3D: Battle Across Time at the request of James Cameron who was preoccupied with Titanic at the time, John Bruno was contacted by Universal Pictures following the success of the attraction with an offer to direct Virus with Gale Anne Hurd as producer. Bruno read the script by Pfarrer and didn't like it and also read Dark Horse comic that was expanded from the script and was initially planning to pass on the film. Following his dives with Cameron to the Titanic and time on the Akademik Mstislav Keldysh, Bruno began to see the possibilities in making Virus work such as changing the vessel from being Chinese to Russian and incorporating a hurricane as a plot device after experiencing the inner workings of Russian vessels and hurricanes during the Titanic voyages. After taking some advice from Cameron to change the film so he liked it, Bruno left Titanic after finding a replacement and agreed to direct the film provided he could make the requested changes.

An international co-production film between The United States, United Kingdom, Japan, France and Germany. The film was mostly shot in Newport News, Virginia, on a ship anchored in the James River. A horizontal bar on the ship was raised and lowered to conceal the horizon line, making it appear the ship was far out at sea. The ship used as the Akademik Vladislav Volkov was the retired Missile Range Instrumentation Ship USNS General Hoyt S. Vandenberg (T-AGM-10). One of the ship's satellite dish antennas was intentionally damaged for the film's final scene where the ship was destroyed. Some of the Cyrillic lettering applied for the film was still visible on the hull before it was sunk on May 27, 2009.

Several lines of dialogue in Virus were improvised. For instance, Richie's emphatic comment that the Volkov has a "fucked-up" antenna resulted from the actor's surprise at the condition of the Vandenberg.

Filming on Virus began on January 1997 and continued through June of that year.

== Release ==
The film was theatrically released on January 15, 1999. A home video release followed on July 20, 1999.

== Reception ==
Virus was a critical and commercial flop, grossing less than half of its budget and earning negative reviews. Based on 50 reviews, the film holds a 14% approval rating on Rotten Tomatoes, with an average rating of 3.4/10. The site's consensus states: "Despite its great special effects, this movie's predictability greatly undermines its intensity." On Metacritic, it holds a weighted average score of 19 out of 100 based on 17 reviews, indicating "overwhelming dislike".

Most critics found the film derivative and unoriginal.

Reviewers pointed out similarities with the 1998 film Deep Rising. Roger Ebert gave Virus an even lower rating than Deep Rising, which he considered one of the worst films of 1998 and placed on his most-hated list. Many echoed his complaint about the underlit cinematography.

Jamie Lee Curtis herself did not think highly of the film. In an IGN.com interview, Curtis had the following to say about Virus: "That would be the all time piece of shit...It's just dreadful... That's the only good reason to be in bad movies. Then when your friends have [bad] movies you can say 'Ahhhh, I've got the best one.' I'm bringing Virus". Curtis also stated in the commentary track of the 2014 Shout Factory Blu-ray release of Halloween H20: 20 Years Later that she tried to get the director (John Bruno) fired because of how bad she thought the film was."

Audiences polled by CinemaScore gave the film an average grade of "C" on an A+ to F scale.

== Merchandise ==
A line of action figures, the Virus Collector Series, was developed by ReSaurus to promote the film. The line included figures of Foster, Baker, Richie, Captain Everton, Captain Alexi, Squeaky and the Goliath Machine (the Goliath set also included a Nadia figure). The captains and Squeaky were built with their cyborg implants, with parts included to restore their human appearance. All of the sets, excluding Goliath and Nadia's, included one or more firearms for their figure. Goliath also featured three sound clips of his lines from the film.

A Europe-only tie-in game, Virus: It is Aware, was also developed and published by Cryo Interactive for the Sony PlayStation. The game is a survival-horror title akin to Resident Evil in concept and to Tomb Raider in control. The game had little to do with the film, apart from the introduction and ending cinematics, which feature creatures infesting a ship and a space station, respectively. The actual game follows a female police officer, Joan, trapped in an infested hotel along with her partner Sutter. The game is generally poorly regarded and has since fallen into obscurity.

The original comics were re-released in graphic novel format with alternate cover artwork based on the film's climax.

A novelization written by author S.D. Perry was also published.

== See also ==
- List of films featuring space stations
