= Viral =

The word Viral means "relating to viruses" (small infectious agents).

It may also refer to:

== Viral behavior, or virality ==
Memetic behavior likened that of a virus, for example:

- Viral marketing, the use of existing social networks to spread a marketing message
- Viral phenomenon, relating to contagion theory or the "virality" of network culture, such as a meme
- Viral video, a video that quickly attains a high popularity

== Titled works ==
- Viral (2016 film), an American science fiction horror drama
- Viral (2016 Hindi film), an Indian Bollywood film based on social media
- Viral (upcoming film), an American psychological thriller film starring Blair Underwood
- Viral (web series), a 2014 Brazilian comedy web series
- V/H/S: Viral, an American anthology horror film
- Viral: The Search for the Origin of COVID-19, a book by Alina Chand and Matt Ridley

== Music ==
=== EPs ===
- Virality

== See also ==
- Virals, a novel series by Kathy Reichs
- Virulence, pathogen's ability to infect or damage host
