= Daryl Gates =

American police chief (1926–2010)

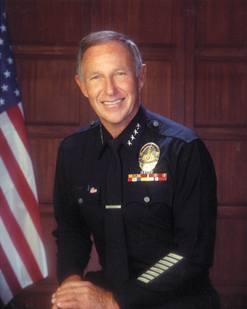
- Official portrait

Chief of the Los Angeles Police Department
- In office March 28, 1978 – June 27, 1992
- Preceded by: Edward M. Davis
- Succeeded by: Willie L. Williams
- Appointed by: Tom Bradley

Personal details
- Born: Darrel Francis Gates; August 30, 1926 Glendale, California, U.S.
- Died: April 16, 2010 (aged 83) Dana Point, California, U.S.
- Party: Republican
- Police career
- Department: Los Angeles Police Department
- Service years: 1949–1992
- Rank: Sworn in as an officer (1949); Commander (1965); Chief of Police (1978)
- Awards: Police Meritorious Unit Citation; Police Meritorious Service Medal; 1984 Summer Olympics Ribbon; 1987 Papal Visit Ribbon; 1992 Civil Disturbance Ribbon
- Other work: Businessman/entrepreneur, talk-show host, radio commentator

Daryl Francis Gates (born Darrel Francis Gates; August 30, 1926 – April 16, 2010) was an American police officer who served as chief of the Los Angeles Police Department from 1978 to 1992. His length of tenure in this position was second only to that of William H. Parker. Gates is often credited with the creation of police SWAT teams and also co-founded the Drug Abuse Resistance Education ("D.A.R.E.") program.

After the arrest of Rodney King and the subsequent riots, Gates resigned from the LAPD. Much of the blame for the riots was attributed to him. According to one study, "scandalous racist violence... marked the LAPD under Gates's tempestuous leadership."

== Early life and education ==
Gates was born in Glendale, California, to a Mormon mother and a Catholic father on August 30, 1926; he was raised in his mother's faith. He grew up in Glendale and Highland Park, in the northeastern part of Los Angeles. The Great Depression affected his early life: his father was an alcoholic, and frequently ended up in the custody of the Glendale police. (Later in life, Gates often remarked on the taunts and harassment he received from schoolmates because of his father's behavior.) Gates later wrote that he had a low opinion of the police due to their rough treatment of his father, and at age 16 Gates himself was arrested after punching an officer who manhandled his brother during a parking dispute (Gates apologized and the charges were dropped).

Gates graduated from Franklin High School in Highland Park and joined the U.S. Navy in time to see action in the Pacific Theater during World War II. After leaving the U.S. Navy, he attended Pasadena City College and married his first wife, Wanda Hawkins. He went on to take pre-law classes at the University of Southern California. After his wife became pregnant, a friend suggested that he join the LAPD, which was conducting a recruitment drive among former servicemen; Gates initially declined, then decided it was a good opportunity. Gates later finished his degree at USC.

== Career ==
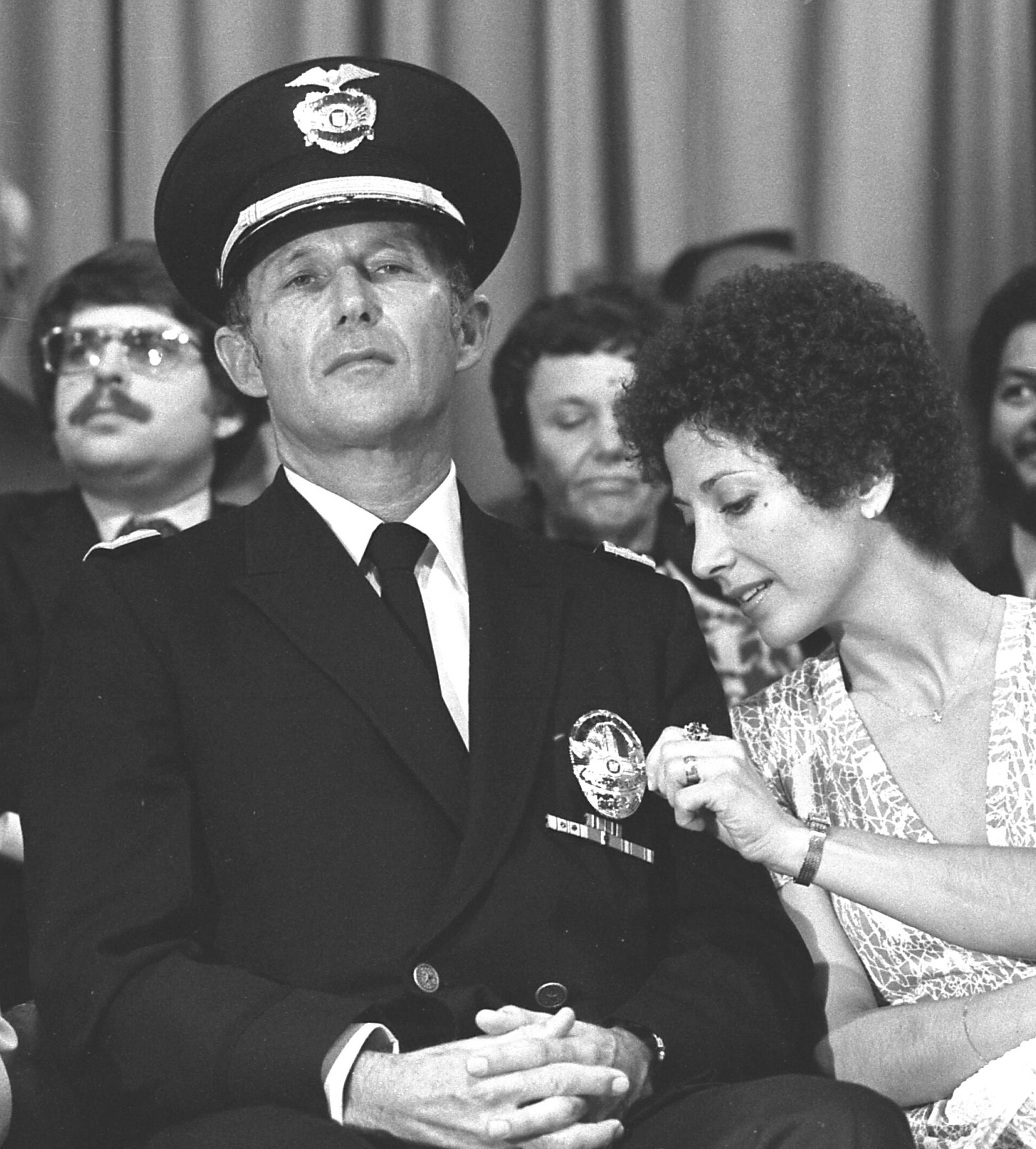
Gates with his wife, Sima, after being sworn in as Los Angeles Police Chief, 1978.

Gates joined the LAPD on September 16, 1949. Among his roles as an officer, he was picked to be the chauffeur for Chief William H. Parker. Gates often remarked that he gained many administrative and professional insights from Parker during the hours they spent together each day.

Gates worked hard to prepare for his promotional exams, scoring first in the sergeant's exam and in every promotional exam thereafter. On his promotion to lieutenant, he rejoined Chief Parker as Parker's executive officer. He was promoted to captain, responsible for intelligence. By the time of the Watts riots in 1965, he was an inspector (overseeing the investigations of, among other crimes, the Manson Family murders and the Hillside Strangler case). By the time of the 1975 special investigation into the assassination of Robert F. Kennedy, he was Assistant Chief of the department. On March 28, 1978, Gates became the 49th chief of the department.

=== SWAT ===
Gates established the specialized unit that became known as SWAT (originally, "Special Weapons Attack Team" but changed to "...And Tactics" for optics) in order to deal with hostage rescue and extreme situations involving armed and dangerous suspects. Ordinary street officers, with light armament, limited weapons training, and little instruction on group fighting techniques, had shown to be ineffective in dealing with snipers, bank robberies carried out by heavily armed persons, and other high-intensity situations. In 1965, Officer John Nelson came up with an idea to form a specially trained and equipped unit to respond to and manage critical situations while minimizing police casualties.

As an inspector, Gates approved this idea. He formed a small select group of volunteer officers. His first team was born LAPD SWAT, D-Platoon of the Metro Division. This unit initially comprised fifteen teams of four men each, for a total staff of sixty. These officers were given special status and benefits, but in return they had to attend monthly trainings and serve as security for police facilities during episodes of civil unrest. SWAT was copied almost immediately by many US police departments and is now used by law enforcement agencies throughout the world.

In Gates' autobiography, Chief: My Life in the LAPD (Bantam Books, 1992), he explained that he developed neither SWAT tactics nor its distinctive equipment. He wrote that he supported the concept, tried to empower his people to develop the concept, and lent them moral support.

=== PDID ===
Gates made substantial use of the LAPD's Public Disorder Intelligence Division (PDID) squad, even developing an international spying operation. The Coalition Against Police Abuse (CAPA) along with two dozen or so other plaintiffs, later sued the LAPD on First Amendment grounds in CAPA v. Gates. The lawsuit exposed the unlawful harassment, surveillance, and infiltration of the progressive movement in Los Angeles by LAPD agents. The lawsuit against Gates and the LAPD proved successful. The PDID was ordered to disband and did so in January 1983. In February 1984, an out-of-court settlement awarded $1.8 million to the named plaintiffs, individuals, and organizations who had sued the City of Los Angeles. The operations included the infiltration of classes at California State University, Northridge.

=== D.A.R.E. ===
In collaboration with the Rotary Club of Los Angeles, Gates founded D.A.R.E., a backronym for Drug Abuse Resistance Education, a program designed to educate students and children about the dangers of drug abuse. DARE has become a worldwide organization, with programs in schools across the globe. However, despite the program's wide use, peer-reviewed government-sponsored scientific research has discredited DARE's claimed effectiveness in reducing alcohol or drug use, and the program has seen a 73% reduction in taxpayer funding as a result.

=== CRASH ===
Gates's appointment as chief roughly coincided with the intensification of the war on drugs. A drug-related issue that had also come to the forefront at the time was gang violence, which paralyzed many of the neighborhoods (primarily impoverished and black or Hispanic) in which gangs held sway. In response, the LAPD set up specialist gang units which gathered intelligence on and ran operations against gangs. These units were called Community Resources Against Street Hoodlums (CRASH). Allegations of false arrest and a general LAPD disdain for young Black and Latino men were made.

Gates himself became a byword among some for excessive use of force by anti-gang units and became a favorite lyrical target for gang-connected urban black rappers, notably Ice Cube. Nevertheless, CRASH's approach appeared successful and remained in widespread use until the Rampart Division scandal of 1999 drew attention to abuses that threatened to undo hundreds of criminal convictions.

=== Force enlargement ===
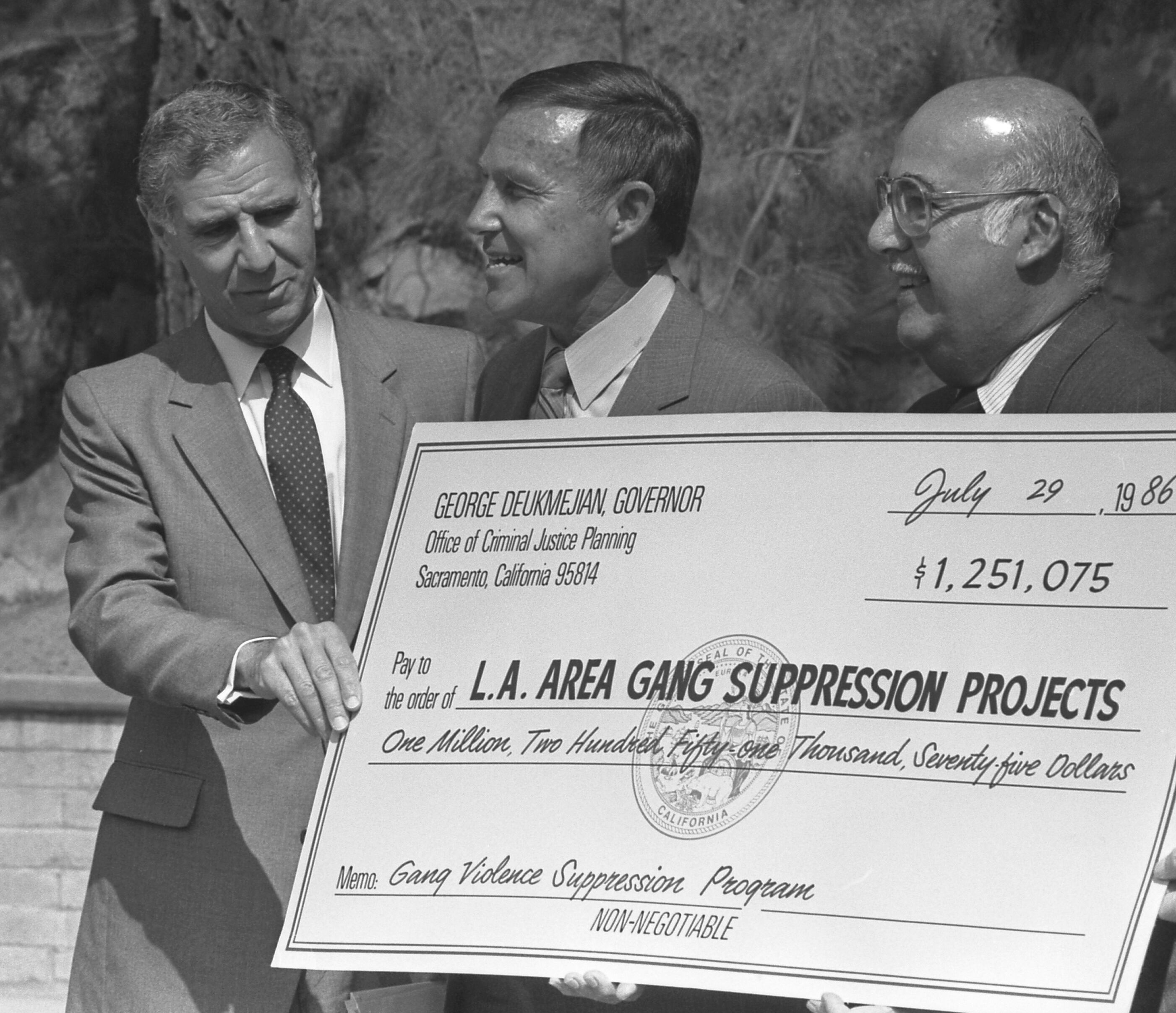
Gates (center) with Governor George Deukmejian and County Sheriff Sherman Block, 1986.

Gates became LAPD chief a little over two months before the enactment of California's Proposition 13, during a time of tremendous change in California politics. While the LAPD traditionally had been a "lean and mean" department compared with other American police forces (a point of pride for Parker), traffic congestion and continually decreasing officer-to-resident ratios (approximately 7,000 police officers for 3 million residents in 1978) diminished the effectiveness of LAPD's prized mobility. Gates was eager to take more recruits, particularly for CRASH units, when the city made funds available.

Gates later claimed that many officers recruited in the 1980s—a period in which the LAPD was subject to a consent decree which set minimum quotas for hiring of women and minorities—were substandard, remarking:

... [I]f you don't have all of those quotas, you can't hire all the people you need. So, you've got to make all of those quotas. And when that happens, you get somebody who is on the borderline, you'd say "Yes, he's black, or he's Hispanic, or it's a female, but we want to bring in these additional people when we have the opportunity. So, we'll err on the side of, 'We'll take them and hope it works out.'" And we made some mistakes. No question about it, we have made some mistakes.

=== Special Order 40 ===
In 1979, Gates helped craft and implement Special Order 40, a mandate that prohibits police officers from stopping people for the sole purpose of obtaining immigration status. The mandate was created in an effort to encourage residents to report crimes without the fear of intimidation or deportation.

=== Administrative style and personality ===
Like his mentor Parker, Gates publicly questioned the effectiveness of community policing, usually electing not to work with community activists and prominent persons in communities in which the LAPD was conducting major anti-gang operations. At the time of the Rodney King beating, Gates was at a community policing conference. This tendency, a logical extension of the policies implemented by Parker that discouraged LAPD officers from becoming too enmeshed in the communities in which they served, did not serve him well politically: allegations of arrogance and racism plagued the department throughout his tenure, surfacing most strongly in the Christopher Commission report.

=== Operation Hammer ===
Many commentators criticized Gates for Operation Hammer, a policing operation conducted by the LAPD in South Central Los Angeles. After eight people were murdered at a birthday party in a drive-by shooting in 1987, Gates responded with an extremely aggressive sweep of South Los Angeles that involved 1,000 officers at any given time.

The operation lasted several years, with multiple sweeps, and resulted in over 25,000 arrests. This was not unprecedented: during the run-up to the 1984 Olympic Games, Mayor Tom Bradley empowered Gates to take all of the city's gang members—known and suspected—into custody, where they remained until shortly after the Games' conclusion. In the years after the Olympic games Gates, Mayor Bradley, and city council officials found a way to continue the sweeping policies initially meant for the duration of the Olympic games by reviving old, anti-syndicalist laws to jail predominantly black and Latino youth, even though the overwhelming numbers of people arrested were never charged.

As a vast majority of those arrested were never charged, Operation Hammer was roundly criticized as a harassment operation whose chief goal was to intimidate young black and Hispanic men. In a PBS interview, when asked whether the local people in the minority areas expressed thanks to the police for their actions, Gates responded:

Sure. The good people did all the time. But the community activists? No. Absolutely not. We were out there oppressing whatever the community had to be, whether it was blacks, or Hispanics. We were oppressing them. Nonsense. We're out there trying to save their communities, trying to upgrade the quality of life of people...

A similar operation was conducted in 1988 after a drive-by shooting took the life of Karen Toshima in Westwood Village.

=== Rodney King and the Los Angeles riots ===
On March 3, 1991, Rodney King was arrested, repeatedly struck with batons and kicked, and taken into custody by LAPD officers after a car chase. A bystander, George Holliday, recorded the event on videotape. Gates and his department faced strong criticism in the aftermath of the arrest; Mayor Tom Bradley also called for Gates to resign, but he refused, leading to a stand-off between Gates and the mayor. The Christopher Commission report, issued July 10, 1991, identified a police culture of excessive force and poor supervision, and recommended numerous reforms, as well as Gates's removal. Gates announced his intention to resign on July 13, 1991.

The 1992 Los Angeles riots on April 29, 1992, began when a Ventura County jury in Simi Valley acquitted three white and one Latino Los Angeles Police Department officers accused in the videotaped beating of black motorist Rodney King following a high-speed pursuit.

Despite the announcement that the jury was preparing to deliver the verdict in the case, the LAPD day shift was sent home. After the riots broke out, Gates told reporters that the situation would soon be under control and left Parker Center to attend a previously scheduled political fundraising dinner. The fundraising event was part of an effort to fight a city charter amendment on the June 2 ballot that would limit the power and term of the police chief. These actions led to charges that Gates was out of touch. General command-and-control failings in the entire LAPD hierarchy during the riots led to criticisms that he was incapable of managing the force. It took the arrival of 10,000 California Army National Guard forces, 3,500 federal troops, and 1,000 federal law enforcement officers to end the unrest over the next six days.

In the aftermath of the riots, local and national media printed and aired dozens of reports deeply critical of the LAPD under Gates, painting it as an army of racist beat cops accountable only to an arrogant leadership. The paramilitary approach that Gates represented resulted in criticism and calls for the LAPD to shift to a community policing strategy.

Gates left the LAPD on June 28, 1992, and was replaced by Willie L. Williams, who had been named Gates's successor on April 16, 1992. A second commission, the Webster Commission, headed by former FBI and CIA Director William H. Webster, was formed in the wake of the riots. Its report, released on October 21, 1992, was generally considered to be scathingly critical of the department (as well as other government agencies) and was especially critical of Gates' management of it.

=== Ig Nobel ===
In 1992, the satiric Ig Nobel Peace Prize was awarded to Daryl Gates "for his uniquely compelling methods of bringing people together."

=== Controversial rhetoric ===
Gates earned notoriety for his controversial rhetoric on many occasions. Some of the most notable examples of this were:

- His testimony before the Senate Judiciary Committee that infrequent or casual drug users "ought to be taken out and shot" because "we're in a war" and even casual drug use is "treason". He later said the testimony was calculated hyperbole.
- In 1982, Gates said that "blacks might be more likely to die from chokeholds because their arteries do not open as fast as they do in 'normal people'". This comment led to calls by the Urban League for his suspension. Gates apologized but refused to retract the comment. In his autobiography, Gates said that he had been misinterpreted and meant that black people were more predisposed to vascular conditions and therefore less likely to have normally functioning arteries.
- In response to an Equal Protection lawsuit filed against LAPD for a pattern of underenforcement of domestic violence laws against LAPD officers, Gates said that a police officer investigated by LAPD for acknowledged domestic violence and brandishing his LAPD service weapon during death threats against his spouse, and who later shot his spouse with his LAPD service weapon, was not the responsibility of LAPD. After the United States Court of Appeal ordered the case could proceed against LAPD, the Equal Protection lawsuit against LAPD led to the creation of the Domestic Violence Offender Gun Ban, often called the "Lautenberg Amendment" ("Gun Ban for Individuals Convicted of a Misdemeanor Crime of Domestic Violence", Pub. L. 104–208 (text) (PDF),[1] 18 U.S.C. § 922(g)(9)[2]), an amendment to the Omnibus Consolidated Appropriations Act of 1997, enacted by the 104th United States Congress in 1996, which bans access to firearms for life by people convicted of crimes of domestic violence.
- On police intelligence gathering, that it “cannot be and never will be as pristine pure as some would like it. There is absolutely no way that we cannot, on occasion, trample on some people’s privacy and their freedom.”

== Life after the LAPD ==
Gates remained professionally active after leaving the LAPD, working with Sierra to create the computer game Police Quest: Open Season, an adventure game set in Los Angeles in which players acting as detectives investigate a series of brutal murders. He appears in the game as Chief of Police and can be found on one of the top floors of Parker Center. Gates was also a principal consultant for Sierra's SWAT series, in which he also appeared. In 1993, Gates was a talk show host on KFI, replacing Tom Leykis. His tenure was short-lived, but he remained a frequent guest on talk radio, especially in regard to policing issues.

=== Businessman ===
Gates was President and CEO of Global ePoint, a surveillance company. He also served on the Advisory Board of PropertyRoom.com, a website for police auctions.

=== Autobiography ===
In 1992, he published Chief: My Life in the LAPD, an autobiography, written with Diane K. Shah. The book details Gates's career and high-profile cases; the book went to press before the L.A. riots.

=== Later years ===
After Bernard Parks was denied a second term as Chief of Police by Mayor James K. Hahn in 2002, Gates, aged 75, told CNN that he intended to apply for his old job as LAPD chief.

== Death ==
On April 16, 2010, Gates died at his home in Dana Point, California, at the age of 83 due to complications from bladder cancer.

== In popular culture ==
Gates appeared as himself in season 7, episode 13 ("Fatal Obsession, Part 2") of the television show Hunter.

Gates appears in an uncredited role at the end of the 1997 film L.A. Confidential as a police officer congratulating Ed Exley, the main character.

In the 1998 film American History X, he is mentioned in relation to the application of police brutality to Rodney King.

Gene Hackman based his portrayal of Sheriff Daggett on Gates in the 1992 film Unforgiven. Clint Eastwood biographer Richard Schickel, who was on the set, wrote that Hackman referred to Daggett overseeing Ned Logan's torture as "my Rodney King scene".

In 2004, he appeared in the second season of Da Ali G Show in the episode "Respek".

Gates is portrayed by actor Josh Pence in the 2013 film Gangster Squad. In the film, Gates is in his younger years, still a chauffeur for LAPD Police Chief Bill Parker (played by Nick Nolte).

Gates was mentioned in a large number of rap and metal songs in the aftermath of the LA riots. Some of the more notable include Ice Cube's "The Wrong Nigga to Fuck With", which includes a verse that imagines that Gates is decapitated and fried like a chicken, and Body Count's "Cop Killer", which caused widespread controversy.

== See also ==
- Joel Wachs, Los Angeles City Council member who paved the way for Gates's resignation
- List of Ig Nobel Prize winners
- Zev Yaroslavsky, Los Angeles City Council member (1974–1994) who sought information on the LAPD's intelligence-gathering activities

Police appointments
Preceded by Robert F. Rock	Chief of Los Angeles Police Department; 1978–1992	Succeeded by Willie L. Williams
