= Pricefalls =

American Internet company

Pricefalls, LLC
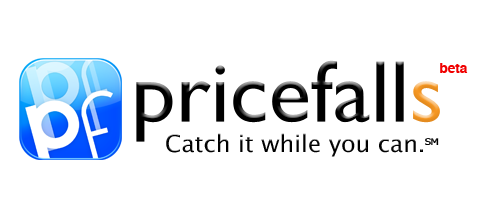
- Company type: Private Electronic commerce
- Website type: Online auction
- Available in: English
- Founded: 2008; 18 years ago
- Headquarters: Las Vegas, Nevada, U.S.
- Area served: U.S.
- Founder: Elliot Moskow
- Key people: Elliot Moskow (Founder, Chairman, and CEO); Peter P. Schaefer (CIO, Executive Vice President); Chad Casey (Creative Director, Marketing Director)
- Industry: Online auction, Shopping mall
- Registration: Required to buy and sell
- Current status: Defunct

Pricefalls Marketplace was an online marketplace. In 2019, it was acquired by Loblaw Companies.

Pricefalls acted as a sales channel for small- to medium-size businesses who wished to expose their products to a wider audience. In 2017, Pricefalls expanded with its SaaS division, PFTech, and began offering marketplace and product information management infrastructures. The company was founded in response to user frustrations with the eBay model, with pronounced emphasis on customer service and dedication to the sellers who use the site.

The company was founded in June 2008 out of an apartment close to Bates College in Lewiston, Maine. The company relocated to Las Vegas, Nevada in January 2009.

== Origins & History ==
The idea of Pricefalls was first imagined in 2008 by Elliot Moskow, an economics major from Bates College, located in Lewiston, Maine. Out of a need to earn extra cash that summer, Elliot obtained confiscated jewelry from police auctions to sell them via eBay. He started with a few rings, some of which sold to buyers with Nigerian shipping addresses. Elliot had received a fraudulent PayPal receipt from a fraudulent user, and additionally had paid fees to list his items, losing money. As a result, Elliot permanently discontinued his activity on eBay and began to think of alternative ways to sell online.

After returning to Bates, Elliot learned of the Dutch Auction and its application in the tulip industry. He then sought out other students capable of technically executing a reverse auction website. His search led him to a partnership with Bates alumni Peter Schaefer and Chad Casey, the creators of a small web media company called Lautus Design.

Pricefalls was acquired by Loblaw in 2019. By early 2019, Pricefalls had in excess of 15 million product listings and had thousands of sellers participate on the marketplace.

As of April 2018, the internet marketplace was used by over 800 businesses actively listing over 3 Million unique items for sale.

Pricefalls.com has been listed as #96 in a list of The World's 230 Most Exemplary Websites.

Pricefalls.com has grown consistently since announcing its public beta in September 2009, after successfully raising USD $400,000 in seed funding from private investors. Although the name "Pricefalls" refers to the descending price as the basis for the business model, recently they have expanded the platform to allow for fixed price listings as well.

== The Listing & Sales Process ==
=== Selling on Pricefalls ===
When selling an item, users proceed through a six-step process, prompting the user to:

1. Choose between creating a Dutch Auction or a Fixed Price Sale.
2. Choose a category for their listing and up to 3 subcategories.
3. Enter a listing title, brand name, condition, and a detailed description of the item.
4. Set their pricing. If the merchant chose the falling price method in step one they are prompted to enter the price ceiling (the most they think someone would be willing to pay), and price floor (the least they are willing to accept), along with a listing duration, and an optional duration that delays the falling of the price (“Catch It Before It Falls” duration). If the merchant chose the fixed price method in step one they simply enter the fixed price that they would like to list the item for. Sellers may also upload up to seven product images, and choose extra exposure options that they would like to add to their listing.
5. Choose how they would like to accept payment for their items, and provide detail into applicable return policy.
6. Review the listing before submitting it to appear on Pricefalls. Upon submitting the listing, the auction will begin.

For falling price auction listings the price will start off at the price ceiling, and drop at a constant rate until the item is purchased or until the time interval at the price floor has expired. The “Catch It Before It Falls” duration is before the listing duration, and marks a period of the Pricefalls sales cycle during which the item remains at the top price (price ceiling. The Catch it before it falls period allows consumers to purchase a product they really want with little competition. It also allows the merchant to experience the most profitable sale possible.

=== Buying on Pricefalls ===
==== Buying on Dutch Auctions ====
Pricefalls enables consumers to purchase merchandise that has been listed using the Dutch auction by using one of two distinct methods: “If it Hits” bids, or “Catch it Now”.

“If it Hits”: When bidding on Pricefalls, users can set a price that they would like to pay for an item. If the price falls to the set bid without anyone purchasing it first then the item is automatically purchased. In the case of a multiple quantity listing, the highest bids win in the order of magnitude.

“Catch it Now”: As the product price is falling buyers may also choose to purchase an item right away. To purchase an item at its current price buyers can click the “Catch it Now” button to finalize the transaction and the quantity purchased is taken off the market. Subsequently, the price falls on the remaining quantity until the maximum quantity is sold or the price floor is reached.

==== Buying on Fixed Price Listings ====
Prices on fixed price listings remain the same throughout the auction. Buyers can simply purchase these items at their fixed price.

==== Pricefalls Payments ====
Payment is made directly from the consumer to the business via one of two currently available payment gateways, Authorize.net or PayPal. When a buyer views an item detail page and clicks “buy”, the buyer is automatically redirected to the sellerʼs PayPal and is then able to submit payment. Buyers can submit payment using their own PayPal account or via credit card. The buyer receives a receipt generated from PayPal and also a confirmation from Pricefalls that the item has been successfully purchased.

If a buyer has made a bid on an item and has won, the buyer can submit payment for the item by looking in the “Won Items” folder in “My Account”. The buyer is then directed to PayPal (or Authorize.net) to submit payment.

In order to link buyers directly to a sellerʼs payment gateway, the PayPal Id (email associated with the sellerʼs PayPal account) is imputed into the payment method field upon listing. This is done in both individual listings and bulk listings. In a bulk listing, all items are placed under one payment gateway, whereas in individual listings, payment options are done on a per item basis. Stores select their “Viable payment options” upon setup. The form of payment that a store accepts is displayed on the store page under the “Policies” tab as well as in every item detail page under the “Payment Methods” tab.

Although uncommon, in some circumstances a seller may not be able to accept payment. In some cases, Pricefalls is willing to accept payment for these companies as a dropship relationship.

== Fees ==
Pricefalls derives revenues from sales commissions collected from merchants upon product sale. Commissions are designed in a sliding scale model, whereby percent-based fees decrease nominally as product prices increase. These product prices fall into three ranges, each of which is associated with a percent value fee. The final value commission is a sum of the applicable fees accumulated within each price interval.

== Service Marks and Slogans ==
Pricefalls, LLC has proprietary rights to its business name, “Pricefalls”, the Pricefalls.com logo, and the slogans “Where Your Bid Wins” and “Catch It While You Can.” The corresponding serial numbers for the service marks are 77609332, 77609341, 77609698, and 77840574. The United States Patent and Trademark Office (USPTO) issued a Notice of Publication for the “Pricefalls” logo, (Serial #77609332) and for the ʻPF” logo, (Serial #77609341); for the slogan “Where Your Bid Wins”, (Serial #77609698) on March 24, 2009; and for the slogan ”Catch It While You Can”, (Serial #77840574) on March 22, 2010; In order to check the status of the applications enter the application serial numbers at the following URL: http://tmportal.uspto.gov/external/portal/tow.

== See also ==
- Dutch auction
- Reverse auction

== Bibliography ==
- Liu, Wen, ed. 復制互聯網—2010全球最值得模仿的230個網站 劉偉,文. 1st ed. Tsinghua University, 2010. Print. ISBN 978-7-302-22502-7
