= Michael Zinzun =

American politician

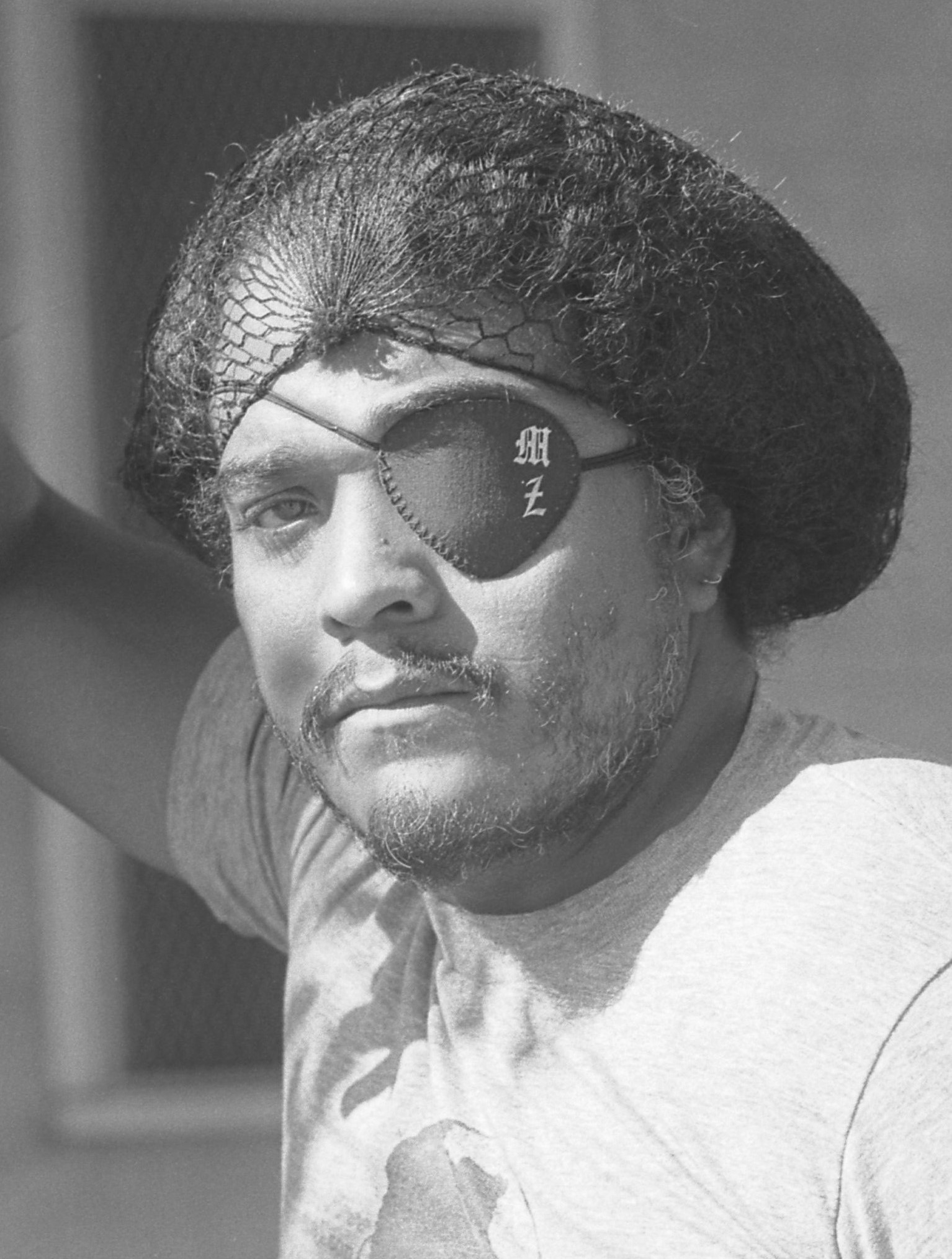
- Zinzun in 1986
- Born: February 14, 1949; Chicago, Illinois, U.S.
- Died: July 9, 2006 (aged 57); Pasadena, California, U.S.
- Occupation: Activist
- Organization: Coalition Against Police Abuse

Michael Zinzun (February 14, 1949 – July 9, 2006) was an African American Black Panther and anti-police brutality activist .

== Early life ==
Zinzun was born in Chicago and lived in the Cabrini–Green housing projects during the early part of his childhood. He told the Los Angeles Times that his mother was Black and his father was Apache, and that his father had eight other children. His father died when he was eight at which point his mother sent him to live with an aunt in Pasadena, California, where he graduated from high school. It was his home for much of his life. After graduation he became an automobile mechanic and ran a repair shop in Altadena. When the land housing his garage was purchased by an oil company Zinzun was evicted and his business forced to close.

== Activism, political organizing, and lawsuits ==
In 1970, he joined the Black Panther Party, but only stayed two years, describing his work with the party as "an educational experience," but "[p]olitically, I felt it was stifling." In 1974, he joined Los Angeles-area anti-police brutality activists B. Kwaku Duren and Anthony Thigpenn to form the Coalition Against Police Abuse (CAPA).

Almost from the moment of CAPA's inception the LAPD infiltrated and placed it under surveillance. The techniques used by the LAPD in spying on and undermining the organization closely resembled those used by the FBI COINTELPRO program. CAPA was the lead plaintiff in a 1983 suit against the LAPD Public Disorder Intelligence Division, which spied on citizens. CAPA won the suit, resulting in a monetary settlement, and the end of the Public Disorder Intelligence Division.

After the 1979 police shooting death of Eulia Love in South Central Los Angeles CAPA proposed a civilian police review board, modeled on similar boards in other cities, that would have had the power to fire and otherwise discipline abusive police officers and change police policies. A petition in favor of the review board gained thousands of signatures, but not enough to place it on the ballot.

In 1982, Zinzun was arrested for allegedly threatening police officers who were attempting to arrest two men in Pasadena. Charges against him were later dropped. In 1986, Zinzun, hearing the commotion of a violent arrest, rushed to the scene to observe the arrest, resulting in police beating him severely. The Pasadena police department accused him of striking an officer (Zinzun was never charged with such a crime) while Zinzun claimed that he was wrongfully forced to the ground, sprayed with mace, and beaten with a flashlight. As a result of the incident Zinzun was permanently blinded in one eye. Following the incident he is quoted as saying "I'd rather lose an eye fighting against injustice than live as a quiet slave." He won a $1.2 million settlement from the department as a result of the events that night.

In 1989, he ran for a seat on the Pasadena City Council. During his campaign the City of Los Angeles and an assistant chief of the LAPD disseminated information that falsely claimed that Zinzun was the subject of investigation by the department's anti-terrorism division. Zinzun sued for defamation and was awarded $3.8 million. This award was overturned on procedural grounds in a 1991 ruling. On further appeal Zinzun won $512, 500.

== Later career ==
Zinzun had a press pass, issued in Los Angeles, and for approximately ten years, he hosted and co-produced, with community activist and artist Nancy Buchanan, approximately 100 episodes of an hour-long monthly television show, Message To The Grassroots. The program dealt with issues related to urban communities, and played on Pasadena Community Network's Channel 56 and at other access television stations in the U.S. Topics of shows included wounds inflicted by the Los Angeles Police Department K-9 corps, the Iran–Contra affair and CIA connection to cocaine shipments into U.S. communities, apartheid in South Africa, the founding of Namibia, the political atmosphere in Haiti with guest commentator Ossie Davis, conflicts between black people and Latinos, and black-against-black gang issues.

Zinzun was an outspoken advocate of a gang truce between rival Los Angeles gangs, and organized one of the first ever, face-to-face truce meetings on his television show between members of the Bloods and Crips. He presented a series of shows during the trial of the police officers accused of beating Rodney King, which included frame-by frame analyses of video tape of the incident by George Holliday, which led to alternative explanations of the police officers' behaviors. Zinzun discovered that a second camera had captured King immediately after the beating and he debuted that footage to the world. During the 1992 Los Angeles riots following the Rodney King decision, Zinzun was down among the burning buildings, on the streets, at the center of the event capturing rare video footage of rioters looting stores. He took cameras to Brazil and Namibia for episodes of the show.

Zinzun died on July 9, 2006, aged 57.

== Sources ==
- Kevin Uhrich and André Coleman, contributing by Tracy Spicer (2006-07-13). "Michael Zinzun 1949-2006: Ex-Black Panther spent much of his time and money battling for social justice". Pasadena Weekly. Archived from the original on 2006-10-17.
- Vargas, Joao H. Costa (2006). Catching Hell in the City of Angels: Life and Meanings of Blackness in South Central Los Angeles. University of Minnesota Press.
