= John Nelson (police officer) =

Creator of SWAT

John G. Nelson
- Born: John G. Nelson; May 14, 1928; Iowa, U.S.
- Died: February 28, 2003 (aged 74); San Clemente, California, U.S.
- Police career
- Country: United States
- Allegiance: Los Angeles
- Department: Los Angeles Police Department
- Service years: 1955–1971
- Rank: Sworn in as officer (1955); Sergeant

John G. Nelson (14 May 1928 – 28 February 2003) was an American police officer with the Los Angeles Police Department who is considered to be the founding father of the SWAT (Special Weapons And Tactics) concept.

After the Watts riots of 1965, Sergeant Nelson personally approached LAPD chief William Parker with his proposal for a SWAT unit. Nelson had served in the United States Marine Corps and based the SWAT concept on the Recon units, believing that a small squad of highly trained police officers armed with special weapons would be more effective in a riotous situation than a massive police response.

Chief Parker liked the proposal and presented it to his command staff. He asked for a volunteer to form the SWAT unit. Fearing a political backlash, no one on his command staff was willing to volunteer, including Daryl Gates. Parker then told Nelson to go ahead and form the SWAT unit himself, which he did.
