= PropertyRoom.com =

Online auction website

- Type: Private
- Industry: Online auction and fixed-price merchandise
- Founded: Prescott, Arizona, USA (1999)
- Headquarters: Frederick, Maryland, USA
- Key people: Aaron Thompson, CEO
- Products: Online police auctions for products including jewelry, watches, coins and bullion, computers, electronics, fashion, fine art, vehicles, equipment bikes, musical instruments, sunglasses and eyewear, tools and equipment, and more.
- Website: www.propertyroom.com

PropertyRoom.com is a live online auction website that sells confiscated police goods and approved third party merchant merchandise to the highest winning bidder. PropertyRoom.com is the largest online police auction website in the United States.

== History ==
PropertyRoom.com was founded by former police officers and detectives in 1999. The idea for the company was developed after observing a large amount of abandoned, seized, and recovered goods in the police property and evidence rooms. If police agencies are not able to return the stolen merchandise to the rightful owners, by law they must sell seized, recovered, found, and unclaimed personal property at public auction. Instead of having traditional auctions with auctioneers where only people who attended could bid, PropertyRoom.com was created so that these goods could be auctioned online where people across the entire United States could place bids 24 hours a day, 7 days a week. For the clients using PropertyRoom.com's service, they handle the pickup of the item from the client, processing and refurbishing if needed, and shipping to winning bidder. The name PropertyRoom.com was derived from the location that agencies hold the confiscated and stolen goods, the property and evidence rooms.

PropertyRoom.com closed their first online auction in 2001. Shortly after launching the website, other municipal agencies such as fire departments, ambulance services, and parks departments also contracted PropertyRoom.com to auction off their excess goods.

== Merchandise ==
PropertyRoom.com sells an array of different merchandise including jewelry, watches, electronics, fine art, purses, and vehicles but also frequently has unusual auctions like a George W. Bush talking doll, coffins, kayaks, an X-ray machine, an eight-person bike, and a 7-foot fiberglass shark. Many of the items listed on PropertyRoom.com are seized or recovered stolen property provided by police agencies. The merchandise is only auctioned after the police have attempted to return the items to the rightful owner and the merchandise is no longer needed in any police investigation. All merchandise is first inspected by trained employees before being sold on the website. Any item found to be counterfeit is not listed at auction and is subsequently destroyed.

== Types of Auctions ==
PropertyRoom.com currently employs three types of auctions listed below:

=== English Auction ===
The most prevalent type of auction found on PropertyRoom.com is a timed English auction where bidders place individual bids higher than the previous bid until the allotted time expires. When the preset auction time expires, the person with the highest bid wins. Most of the PropertyRoom.com English auctions start at $1 with no reserve and typically run for three to five days.

=== Reserve Price English Auction ===
This auction operations the same as the timed English auction, however a predetermined reserve price must be reached before the seller agrees to sell the item. On PropertyRoom.com the reserve price is not disclosed, but the listing indicates whether the minimum or reserve price has been reached.

=== Fixed Price ===
An auction listing that actually does not use a bidding process. On the fixed price listings customers are able to immediately buy the item for the price listed on the website without placing bids.

== Proxy Bidding ==
PropertyRoom.com allows registered users to set up proxy bidding so that the system automatically places bids on the buyers behalf instead of the user manually placing the bid through the website. Customers who use proxy bidding establish their 'Maximum Bid Amount' for each individual auction and the system then automatically places continuous bids any time you are outbid until the 'Maximum Bid Amount' has been reached.

== Benefits to Law Enforcement & Municipal Clients ==
PropertyRoom.com auctions confiscated goods for over 3,000 local police departments and municipalities. PropertyRoom.com handles the pickup, inspection, processing, refurbishing, listing, and the shipping of the merchandise provided by law enforcement and municipal clients. Instead of conducting traditional live auctions where bidder turnout tended to be low, police departments are able to offer their merchandise to registered users. With a much larger number of potential bidders, PropertyRoom.com auctions typically have a winning bid price higher than live traditional offline police auctions. This service also allows police and municipal clients to eliminate overhead and overtime to off-duty employees organizing an auction, allowing them to concentrate on their core responsibilities. These agencies typically use the money earned to clean up the streets, help deter more crime, and contribute to the municipal fund of the city.
