= SWAT =

American tactical law enforcement unit

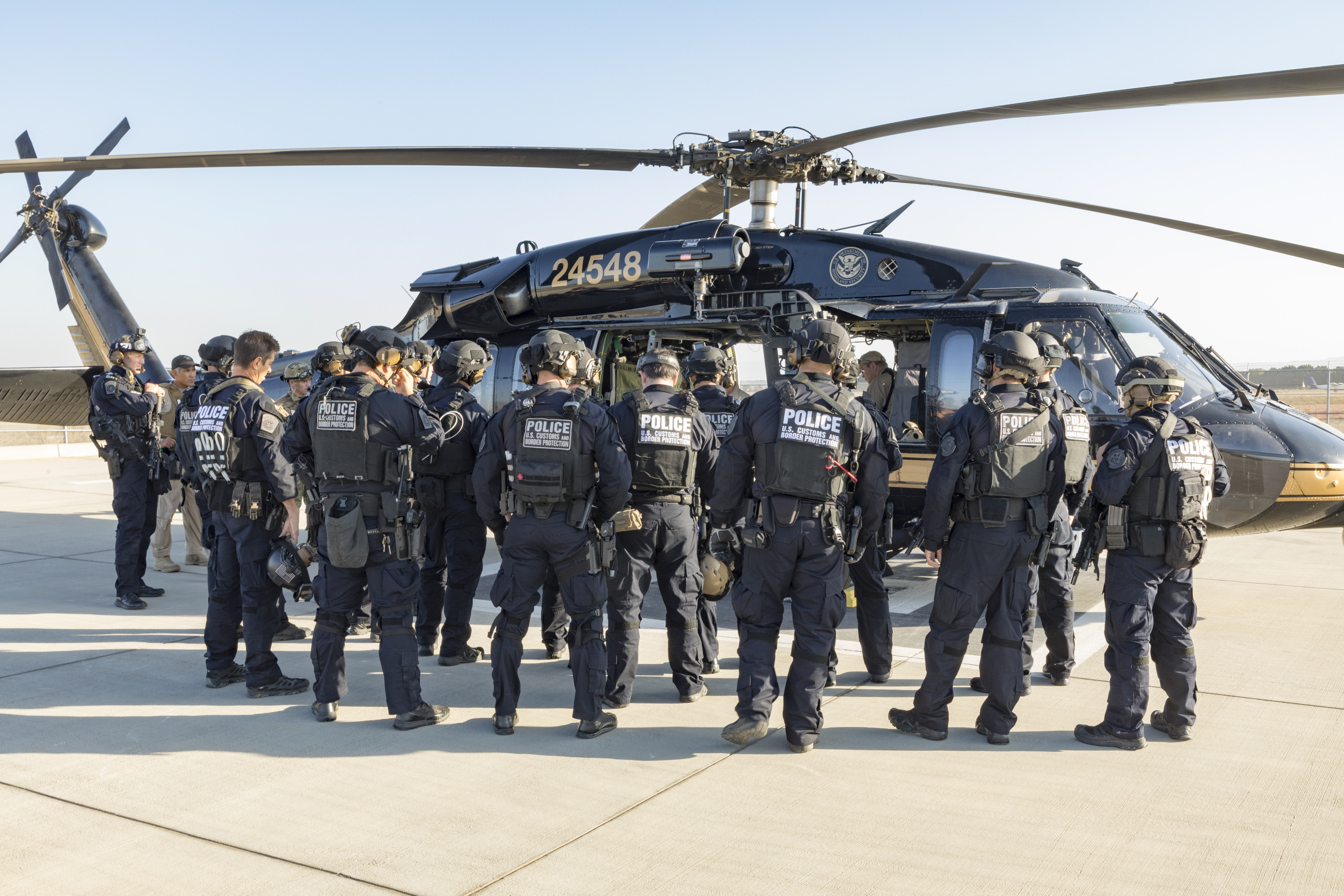
U.S. Customs and Border Protection SWAT officers preparing for a training exercise

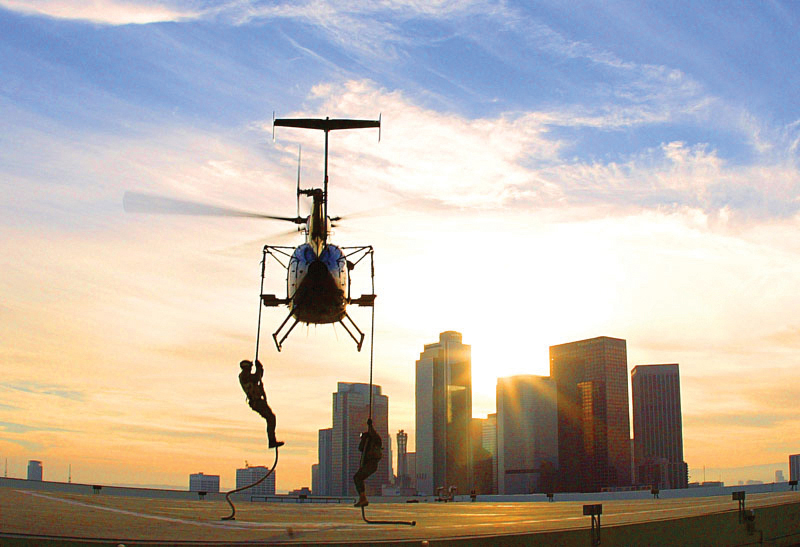
Federal Bureau of Investigation SWAT agents fast-roping from a helicopter during training near downtown Los Angeles

A SWAT (Special Weapons and Tactics) team is a generic term for a police tactical unit within the United States, though the term has also been used by other nations.

SWAT units are generally trained, equipped, and deployed to resolve "high-risk situations", often those regular police units are not trained or equipped to handle, such as shootouts, standoffs, raids, hostage-takings, and terrorism. SWAT units are equipped with specialized weapons and equipment not normally issued to regular police units, such as automatic firearms, high-caliber sniper rifles, stun grenades, body armor, ballistic shields, night-vision devices, and armored vehicles, among others. SWAT units are often trained in special tactics such as close-quarters combat, door breaching, crisis negotiation, and de-escalation.

The first SWAT units were formed in the 1960s to handle riot control and violent confrontations with criminals. The number and usage of SWAT units increased in the 1980s during the war on drugs and the 1990s following incidents such as the North Hollywood shootout and Columbine High School massacre, with further increases in the 2000s for counterterrorism interests in the aftermath of the September 11 attacks. In the United States by 2005, SWAT teams were deployed 50,000 times every year, almost 80% of the time to serve search warrants, most often for narcotics. By 2015, the number of annual SWAT deployments had increased to nearly 80,000 times a year. Despite their heightened involvement in high-risk scenarios, research on their use of force has shown varied results. A study by Professor Jimmy J. Williams and Professor David Westall found that there wasn't a significant difference in the frequency of use of force between SWAT and non-SWAT officers when responding to similar situations.

== Definition ==
The United States National Tactical Officers Association's definition of SWAT is:

SWAT: A designated law enforcement team whose members are recruited, selected, trained, equipped and assigned to resolve critical incidents involving a threat to public safety which would otherwise exceed the capabilities of traditional law enforcement first responders and/or investigative units.

== History ==
=== Riots and political conflicts of the 1960s ===
The LAPD Metropolitan Division's "D" Platoon is one of the world's most prominent SWAT units and was the second SWAT team established in the United States, after that of the Philadelphia Police Department in 1964.

According to the Historical Dictionary of Law Enforcement, the term "SWAT" was used as an acronym for the "Special Weapons and Tactics" established as a 100-man specialized unit in 1964 by the Philadelphia Police Department in response to an alarming increase in bank robberies. The purpose of this unit was to react quickly and decisively to bank robberies while they were in progress, using a large number of specially trained officers who had a great amount of firepower at their disposal. The tactic worked and was used to resolve other types of incidents involving heavily armed criminals. The Los Angeles Police Department (LAPD) Special Weapons and Tactics was established in 1967. LAPD inspector Daryl Gates envisioned the "SWAT" acronym to be "Special Weapons Attack Team" but this was not accepted by deputy chief Edward M. Davis who instead approved Special Weapons and Tactics.

The LAPD promoted what became known as SWAT teams for a variety of reasons. After the racially-charged Watts riots in Los Angeles in August 1965, the LAPD began considering tactics it could use when faced with urban unrest, rioting, or widespread violence. Daryl Gates, who led the LAPD response to the riots, would later write that police at the time did not face a single mob, but rather "people attacking from all directions". New York University professor Christian Parenti has written that SWAT teams were originally conceived of as an "urban counterinsurgency bulwark".

Another reason for the creation of SWAT teams was the fear of lone or barricaded gunmen who might outperform police in a shootout, as happened in Austin with Charles Whitman.

After the LAPD's establishment of its own SWAT team, many law enforcement agencies in United States established their own specialized units under various names. Gates explained in his autobiography Chief: My Life in the LAPD that he neither developed SWAT tactics nor the associated and often distinctive equipment; but that he supported the underlying concept, tried to empower his people to develop it, and generally lent them moral support.

SWAT-type operations were conducted north of Los Angeles in the farming community of Delano, California on the border between Kern and Tulare Counties in the San Joaquin Valley. At the time, the United Farm Workers union led by César Chavez was staging numerous protests in Delano in a strike that would last over five years from 1965 to 1970. Though the strike never turned violent, the Delano Police Department responded by forming ad-hoc SWAT-type units involving crowd and riot control, sniper skills, and surveillance. Television news stations and print media carried live and delayed reportage of these events across the United States. Personnel from the LAPD, having seen these broadcasts, contacted Delano and inquired about the program. One officer then obtained permission to observe the Delano Police Department's special weapons and tactics units in action, and afterwards, he took what he had learned back to Los Angeles, where his knowledge was used and expanded on to form the LAPD's own first SWAT unit.

John Nelson was the officer who conceived the idea to form a specially trained and equipped unit in the LAPD, intended to respond to and manage critical situations involving shootings while minimizing police casualties. Inspector Gates approved this idea, and he formed a small select group of volunteer officers. This first SWAT unit initially consisted of fifteen teams of four men each, making a total staff of sixty. These officers were given special status and benefits, and were required to attend special monthly training sessions. The unit also served as a security unit for police facilities during civil unrest. The LAPD SWAT units were organized as "D Platoon" in the Metro division.

Early police powers and tactics used by SWAT teams were aided by legislation passed in 1967–68 with the help of Republican House representative Donald Santarelli. The legislation was promoted within the context of fears over the civil rights movement, race riots, the Black Panther Party, and the emerging war on drugs.

The first significant deployment of the LAPD SWAT was on December 9, 1969, when an attempt by the LAPD to serve arrest warrants against the Black Panthers led to a four-hour standoff at their Los Angeles headquarters at 41st and Central, during which over 5,000 rounds were exchanged between police and the Panthers. During the shootout, Daryl Gates called the Department of Defense, requesting and receiving permission to use a grenade launcher; however, it was never actually used. The Panthers eventually surrendered, with four Panthers and four officers being injured. All six arrested Panthers were acquitted of the most serious charges brought against them, including conspiracy to murder police officers, because it was ruled that they acted in self-defense.

By 1974, there was a general acceptance of SWAT as a police resource in Los Angeles.

==== 1974 Symbionese Liberation Army shootout ====
On the afternoon of May 17, 1974, elements of the Symbionese Liberation Army (SLA), a group of heavily armed left-wing guerrillas, barricaded themselves in a residence on East 54th Street at Compton Avenue in Los Angeles. Coverage of the siege was broadcast to millions via television and radio and featured in the world press for days afterwards. SWAT teams engaged in a several-hour gun battle with the SLA; no police were wounded, but the six SLA members died in the conflict, which ended when the house caught fire and burned to the ground.

By the time of the SLA shootout, SWAT teams had reorganized into six 10-man teams, each team being divided further into two five-man units, called elements. An element consisted of an element leader, two assaulters, a scout, and a rear-guard. The normal complement of weapons was a sniper rifle (a .243-caliber bolt-action, based on the ordnance expended by officers at the shootout), two .223-caliber semi-automatic rifles, and two shotguns. SWAT officers also carried their service revolvers in shoulder holsters. Standard gear included a first aid kit, gloves, and a military gas mask. At a time when officers were usually issued six-shot revolvers and shotguns, it was a significant change to have police armed with semi-automatic rifles. The encounter with the heavily armed Symbionese Liberation Army, however, sparked a trend towards SWAT teams being issued body armor and automatic weapons of various types.

A report issued by the LAPD after the SLA shootout offers one of the few firsthand accounts by the department regarding SWAT history, operations, and organization. On page 100 of the report, the department cites four trends which prompted the development of SWAT. These included riots such as the Watts riots, which in the 1960s forced the LAPD and other police departments into tactical situations for which they were ill-prepared; the emergence of snipers as a challenge to civil order; political assassinations; and the threat of urban guerrilla warfare by militant groups. "The unpredictability of the sniper and his anticipation of normal police response increase the chances of death or injury to officers. To commit conventionally trained officers to a confrontation with a guerrilla-trained militant group would likely result in a high number of casualties among the officers and the escape of the guerrillas." To deal with these under conditions of urban violence, the LAPD formed SWAT, notes the report. The report states on page 109, "The purpose of SWAT is to provide protection, support, security, firepower, and rescue to police operations in high personal risk situations where specialized tactics are necessary to minimize casualties."

=== War on drugs: 1980s and 1990s ===
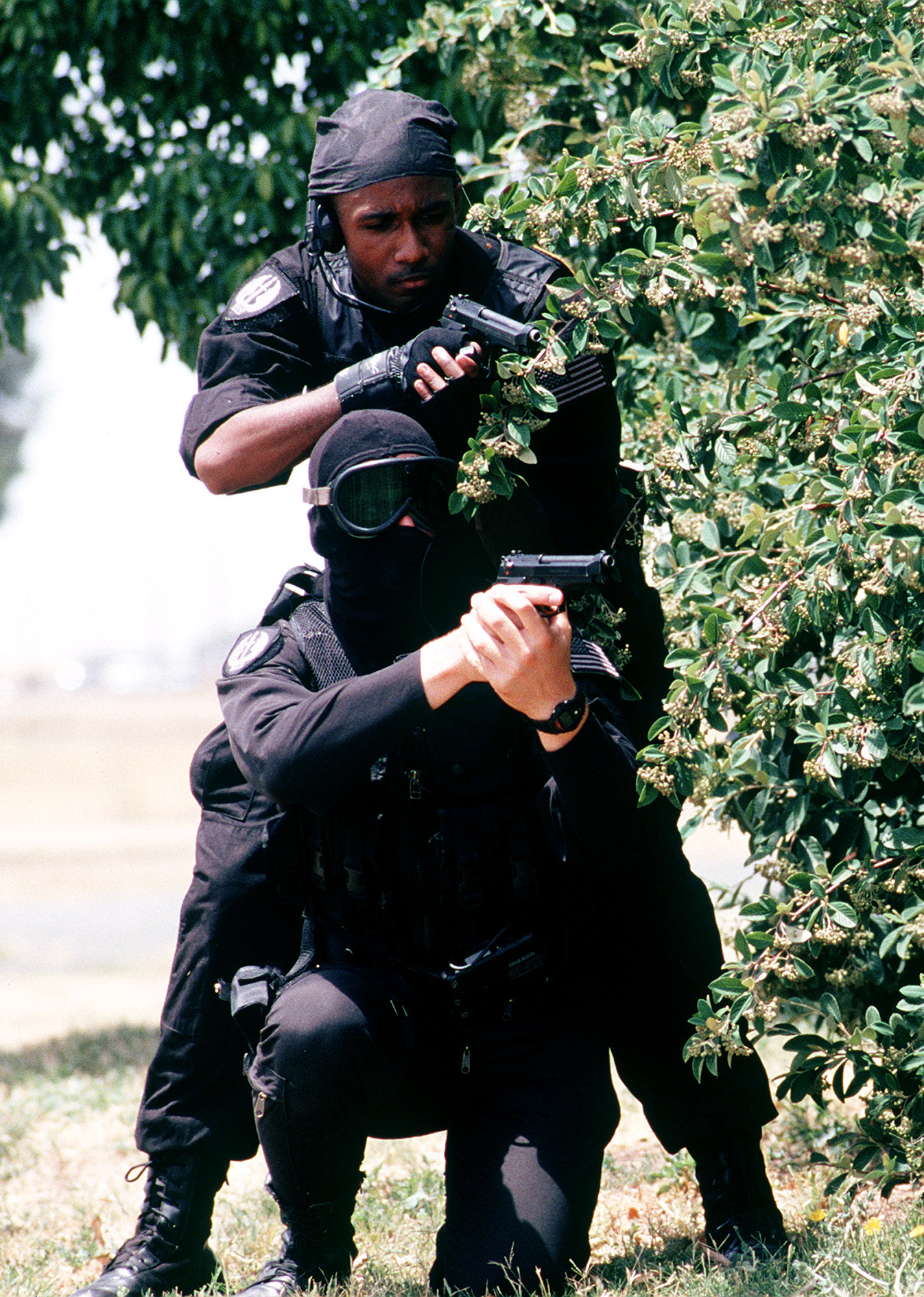
USAF Security Forces SWAT officers during a training exercise at Travis Air Force Base in 1995

In 1981, the U.S. Congress passed the Military Cooperation with Law Enforcement Act, giving police access to military intelligence, infrastructure, and weaponry in the fight against drugs. Reagan subsequently declared drugs to be a threat to U.S. national security. In 1988 the Reagan administration encouraged Congress to create the Edward Byrne Memorial State and Local Law Enforcement Program. The program modified existing federal aid structures to local police, making it easier to transfer money and equipment to fight the war on drugs. Police forces also received increased assistance from the DEA. The money resulted in the creation of many narcotics task forces, and SWAT teams became an important part of these forces.

In 1972, paramilitary police units launched a few hundred drug raids annually within the United States. In the early 1980s, SWAT drug raid numbers increased to 3000 annually, and by 1996, 30,000 raids annually. During the 1990s, according to The Capital Times in Madison, Wisconsin, weapons donations from the Department of Defense greatly bolstered the number of SWAT teams and the extent of their operations. The paper reported that the military transferred nearly 100,000 pieces of military equipment to Wisconsin police departments in the 1990s.

Criminal justice professors Peter Kraska and Victor Kappeler, in their study Militarizing American Police: The Rise and Normalization of Paramilitary Units, surveyed police departments nationwide and found that their deployment of paramilitary units had grown tenfold between the early 1980s and late 1990s.

==== Columbine shooting ====
The Columbine High School massacre in Colorado on April 20, 1999 was another seminal event in SWAT tactics and police response. As perpetrators Eric Harris and Dylan Klebold were shooting students and staff inside the school, officers did not intervene in the shooting, but instead set a perimeter as they were trained to do. By the time they did enter the school, 12 people were killed and Harris and Klebold had committed suicide. They were also heavily criticized for not saving teacher Dave Sanders, who had died from blood loss, three hours after the SWAT first entered the school. As noted in an article in the Christian Science Monitor, "Instead of being taught to wait for the SWAT team to arrive, street officers are receiving the training and weaponry to take immediate action during incidents that clearly involve suspects' use of deadly force." The article further reported that street officers were increasingly being armed with rifles, and issued heavy body armor and ballistic helmets, items traditionally associated with SWAT units. The idea was to train and equip street officers to make a rapid response to so-called active shooter situations. In these situations, it was no longer acceptable to simply set up a perimeter and wait for SWAT. As an example, in the policy and procedure manual of the Minneapolis Police Department, it is stated, "MPD personnel shall remain cognizant of the fact that in many active shooter incidents, innocent lives are lost within the first few minutes of the incident. In some situations, this dictates the need to rapidly assess the situation and act quickly in order to save lives."

=== Post-9/11 and the war on terror ===
According to criminal justice professor Cyndi Banks, the war on terror, like the war on drugs, became the context of a significant expansion of SWAT policing. Whereas some have attributed this expansion to "mission creep" and the militarization of police, other scholars argue that increased SWAT policing is a response to real or perceived moral panics associated with fear of crime and terrorism. Banks writes that SWAT team employment of military veterans has influenced their tactics and perspective.

Countering the view that post-9/11 SWAT policing represents the militarization of police forces, scholar den Heyer writes that SWAT policing is part of a natural progression towards police professionalization. Den Heyer also argues that while SWAT teams continue to be deployed to execute large numbers of drug warrants, this is a rational use of available police resources. Other defenders of SWAT deployments state that police have every reason to minimize risks to themselves during raids.

By 2005, the number of yearly SWAT deployments in the United States had increased to 50,000, most often to serve drug-related warrants in private homes. According to a study by the ACLU, just under 80% of SWAT deployments were used to serve arrest warrants.

Officers have cited safety as the main reason for use of SWAT teams, stating that SWAT units would frequently be called if there were a possibility a suspect might be armed. For instance, in 2006, only two police officers were killed in the arrest of 2 million drug suspects, a low casualty rate possibly stemming from the military equipment and tactics used in the raids.

On February 7, 2008, a siege and subsequent firefight with a shooter in the Winnetka neighborhood of Los Angeles led to the first line-of-duty death of a member of the LAPD's SWAT team in its 41 years of existence.

Radley Balko, an analyst for the libertarian Cato Institute, argued in his book Overkill: The Rise of Paramilitary Police Raids in America that increased SWAT raids have made no-knock raids, and danger to innocents and suspects, far greater. Another study, Warrior Cops: The Ominous Growth of Paramilitarism in American Police Departments by Diane Cecilia Weber, also of the Cato Institute, raised concern about the increasing use of SWAT teams for ordinary policing tasks.

== Organization ==
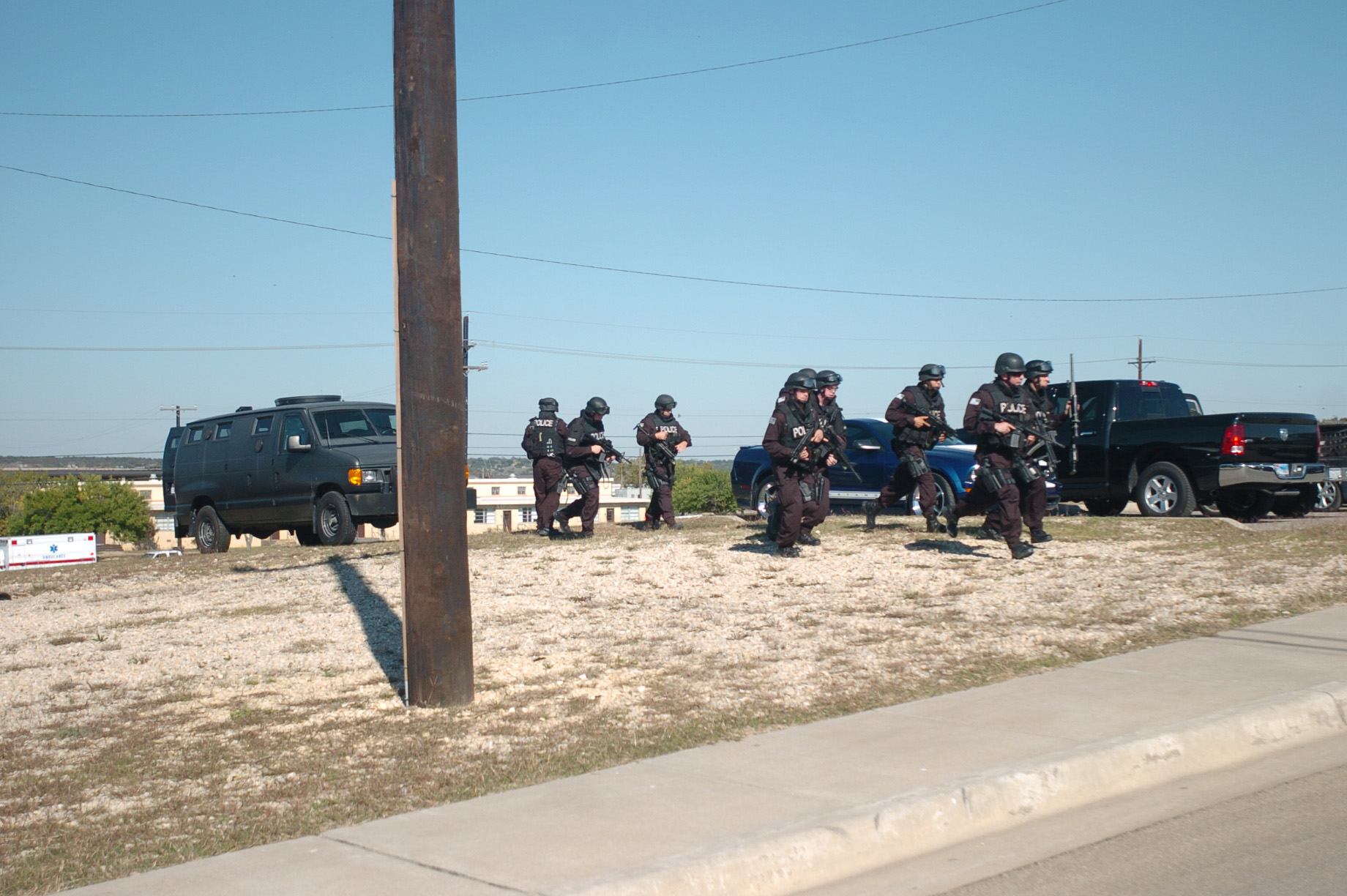
DoD SWAT officers responding to the 2009 Fort Hood shooting in Texas

The relative infrequency of SWAT call-outs means these expensively trained and equipped officers cannot be left to sit around, waiting for an emergency. In many departments the officers are normally deployed to regular duties, but are available for SWAT calls via pagers, mobile phones, or radio transceivers. Even in larger police agencies, SWAT personnel will normally be seen in crime suppression roles—specialized and more dangerous than regular patrol, but the officers would not be carrying their distinctive armor and weapons.

Since officers have to be on call-out most of the day, they may be assigned to regular patrol duties. To decrease response times to situations that require a SWAT team, it is now a common practice to place SWAT equipment and weaponry in secured lockers in the trunks of specialized police cruisers instead of forcing officers to travel to gather their equipment or only use a single dedicated SWAT vehicle.

By illustration, the LAPD's website shows that in 2003, their SWAT units were activated 255 times for 133 SWAT calls and 122 times to serve high-risk warrants. The NYPD's Emergency Service Unit is one of the few police special-response units that operate autonomously 24 hours a day. However, this unit also provides a wide range of services in addition to SWAT functions, including search and rescue, and car accident vehicle extrication, normally handled by fire departments or other agencies.

The need to summon widely dispersed personnel, then equip and brief them, makes for a long lag between the initial emergency and actual SWAT deployment on the ground. The problems of delayed police response at Columbine led to changes in police response, mainly rapid deployment of line officers to deal with an active shooter, rather than setting up a perimeter and waiting for SWAT to arrive.

== SWAT equipment ==
SWAT teams use equipment designed for a variety of specialist situations including close-quarters combat (CQC) in an urban environment. The particular pieces of equipment vary from unit to unit, but there are some consistent trends in what they wear and use. Much of their equipment is indistinguishable from that supplied to the military, not least because much of it is military surplus.

=== Clothing ===
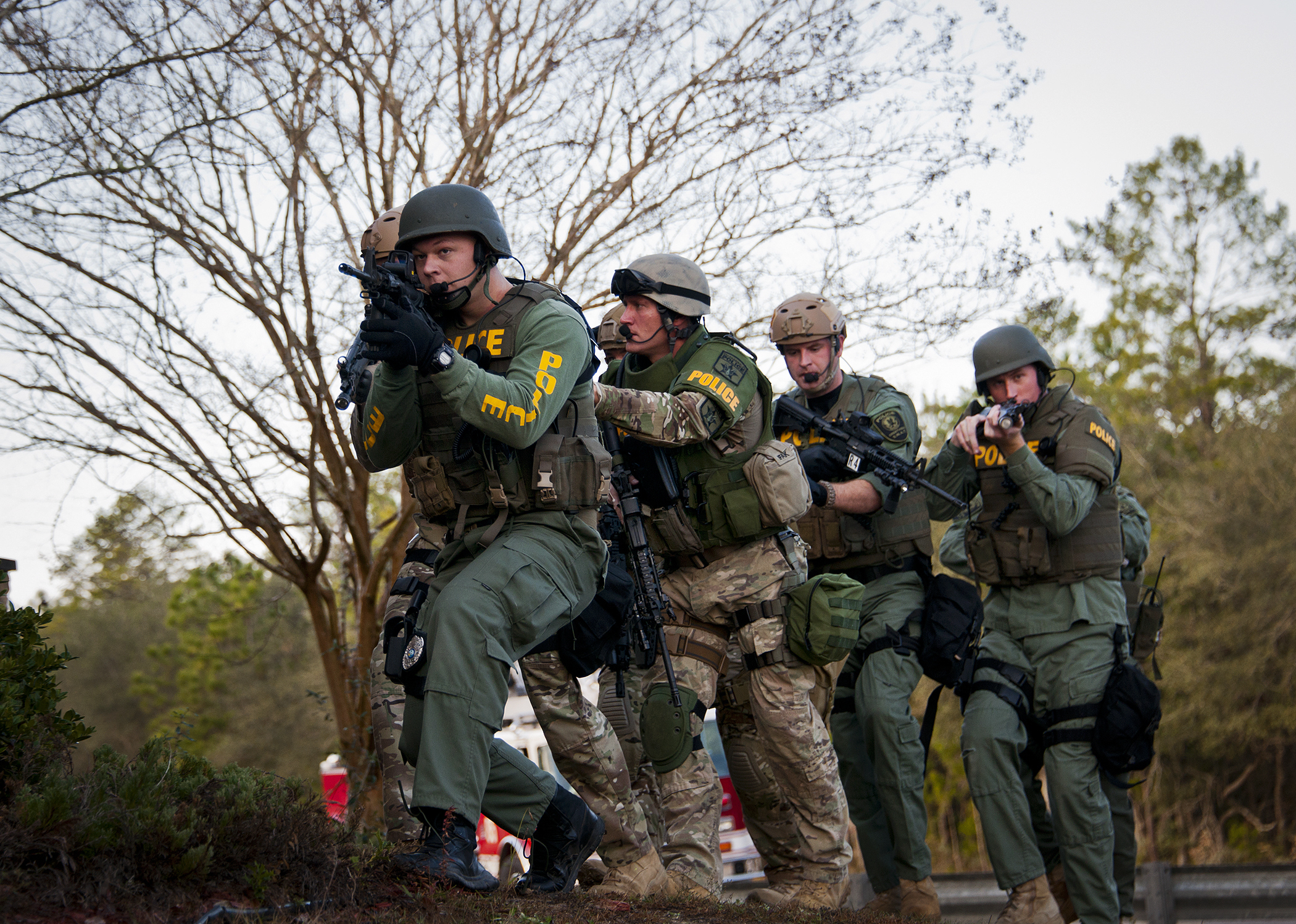
Crestview Police Department SWAT officers wearing different combat uniforms during an active shooter exercise at Eglin Air Force Base in 2013

SWAT personnel wear similar uniforms to those worn by military personnel. Traditional SWAT uniforms are usually solid tones of dark blue, black, grey, tan, or olive green, though uniforms with military camouflage have become popular with some SWAT units since the 2000s.

Early SWAT units were equipped with a variety of headgear such as M1 helmets, motorcycle helmets, bump helmets, or even soft patrol caps. Modern SWAT units use helmets similar to those issued by the U.S. military, such as the PASGT helmet or Future Assault Shell Technology helmet, though they may also use riot helmets or soft headgear such as caps. Balaclavas and goggles are often used to protect the face and protect the identities of team members. Ballistic vests, sometimes including rigid plate inserts, are standard-issue. These vests are labelled with "POLICE", "SHERIFF", "SWAT", or similar, to allow for easy identification.

=== Weapons and equipment ===
SWAT units are equipped with special weapons that are not normally used by regular police units, typically military firearms such as assault rifles, submachine guns, riot shotguns, sniper rifles, riot control agents, smoke grenades, stun grenades, and stinger grenades. Though these armaments make SWAT teams resemble military infantry squads, they are still law enforcement units tasked with arrest, and are thus often also equipped with less-lethal weapons such as tasers, pepper spray, pepperballs, baton rounds, bean bag rounds, and rubber bullets to incapacitate suspects. Many SWAT units also have access to specialized equipment such as ballistic shields, entry tools, battering rams, armored vehicles, thermal and night-vision devices, fiberscope cameras, and motion detectors.

Canine units may also be incorporated within SWAT teams, or may be used on an ad hoc basis.

=== Vehicles ===
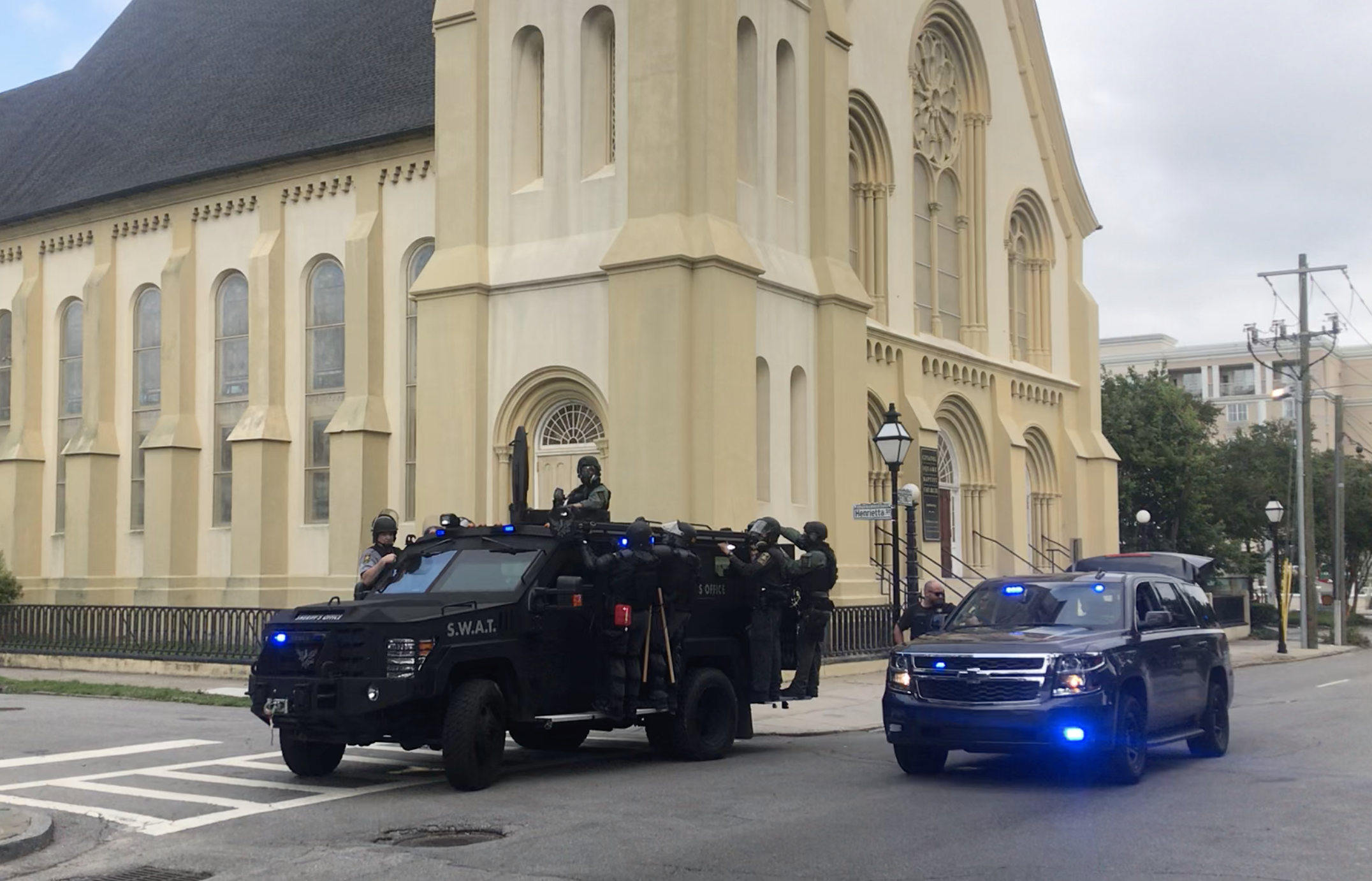
SWAT officers on a Lenco BearCat, an infantry mobility vehicle notable for common police use, in Charleston County, South Carolina

SWAT units often employ SWAT vehicles, also called "armored rescue vehicles" (ARV), for insertion, maneuvering, and during operations such as the rescue of personnel and civilians who may be in danger of receiving fire from suspects if extracted through other methods. Common armored SWAT vehicles include the Lenco BearCat, Lenco BEAR, BAE Caiman, Cadillac Gage Ranger, Cadillac Gage Commando, and similar vehicles. Some departments use decommissioned, disarmed military vehicles acquired from the Law Enforcement Support Office. Alternatively, SWAT teams may use unmarked police cars to respond faster, provide better mobility when splitting up, or avoid detection.

Police aircraft, commonly helicopters, are used to provide aerial reconnaissance or insertion via rappelling or fast-roping.

The use of armored vehicles by SWAT teams is controversial, and it has been alleged that police armored vehicles escalate situations that could otherwise be resolved peacefully. Some smaller police departments and sheriff's departments also acquire armored vehicles despite few incidents occurring in their jurisdictions that would necessitate their use.

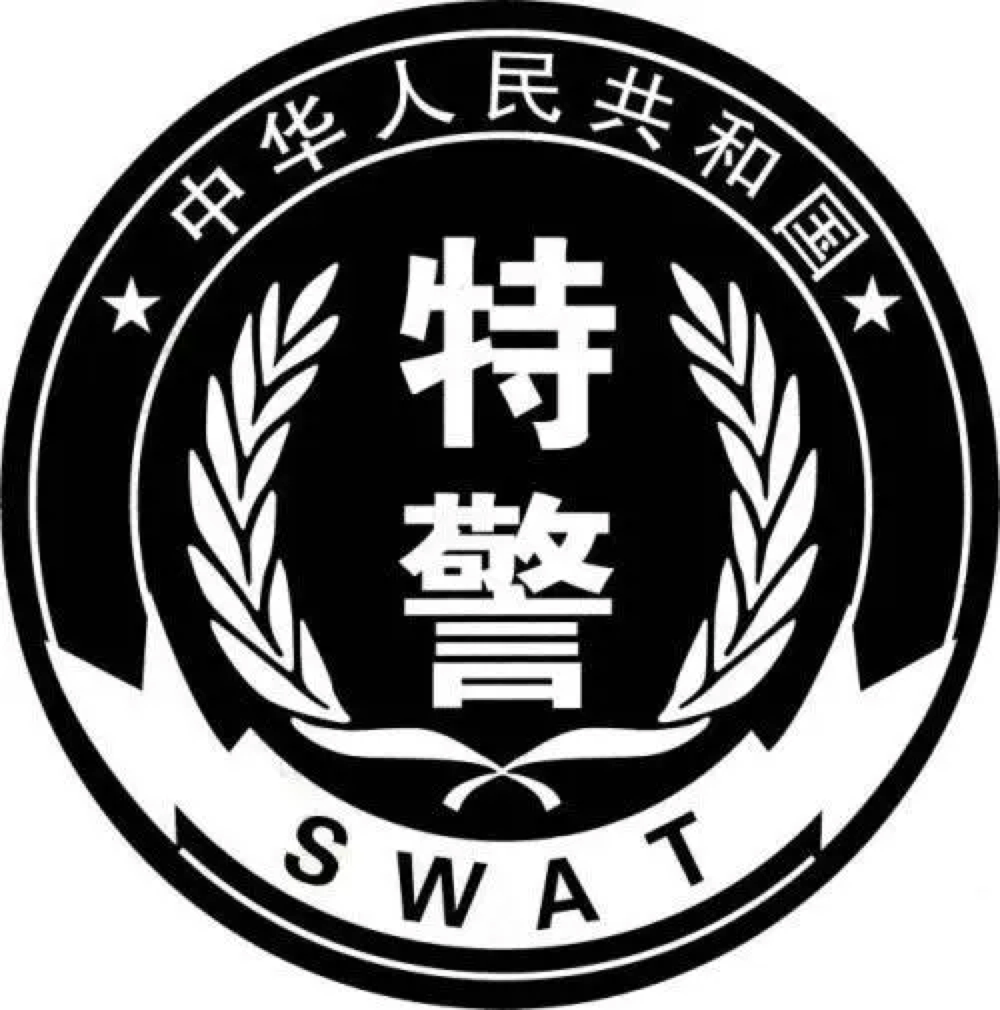
Patch of People's Police SWAT officers

== China ==
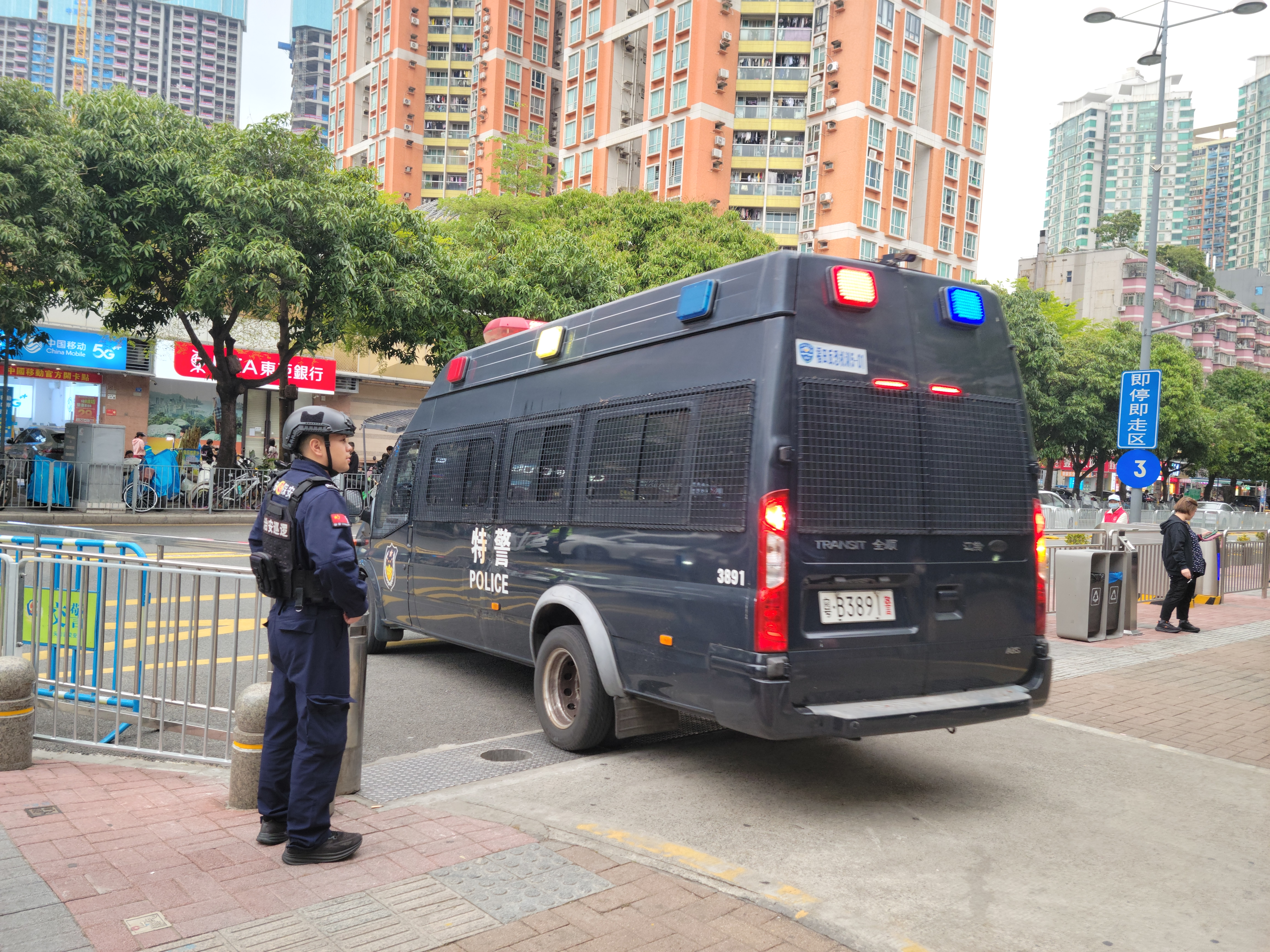
Shenzhen SWAT vehicle

Chinese public security bureaus use the term "SWAT" (Chinese: 特警; pinyin: Tèjǐng; lit. 'Special Police', sometimes more specifically referred to as Public Security SWAT (Chinese: 公安特警; pinyin: Gōng'ān tèjǐng)), to refer to police tactical units. Outside of counter-terrorism, raids and responding to active shooters, SWAT teams in China also often have extra duties such as riot control and disaster relief. They are also occasionally known as "Patrol SWAT" (Chinese: 特巡警; pinyin: Tè xúnjǐng; lit. 'Special patrol police').

SWAT vehicles in China are typically colored black. Many SWAT teams in China also perform duties of normal patrol officers when not responding to special incidents. In some smaller Public Security Bureaus, SWAT units are also used to handle police dogs.

Chinese SWAT often train in fast-roping, sniping and pit maneuvering.

=== Specialized SWAT ===
==== Prison SWAT ====
Some Chinese prisons also operate Prison SWAT teams (Chinese: 监狱特警; simplified Chinese: 监狱特警; traditional Chinese: 監獄特警; pinyin: Jiānyù tèjǐng). They are used to respond to sudden incidents at prisons (e.g. Prison riots), provide security when prisoners go to hospital, patrol duties along with searching for contraband. In Guangdong, Prison SWAT is also responsible for firefighting within the prison.

In some prisons with Female prisoners, there have been All-Female SWAT teams to handle issues in the Female prison area, most famously at Sichuan Province Qiaowo Prison.

== Notable incidents ==
=== United States ===
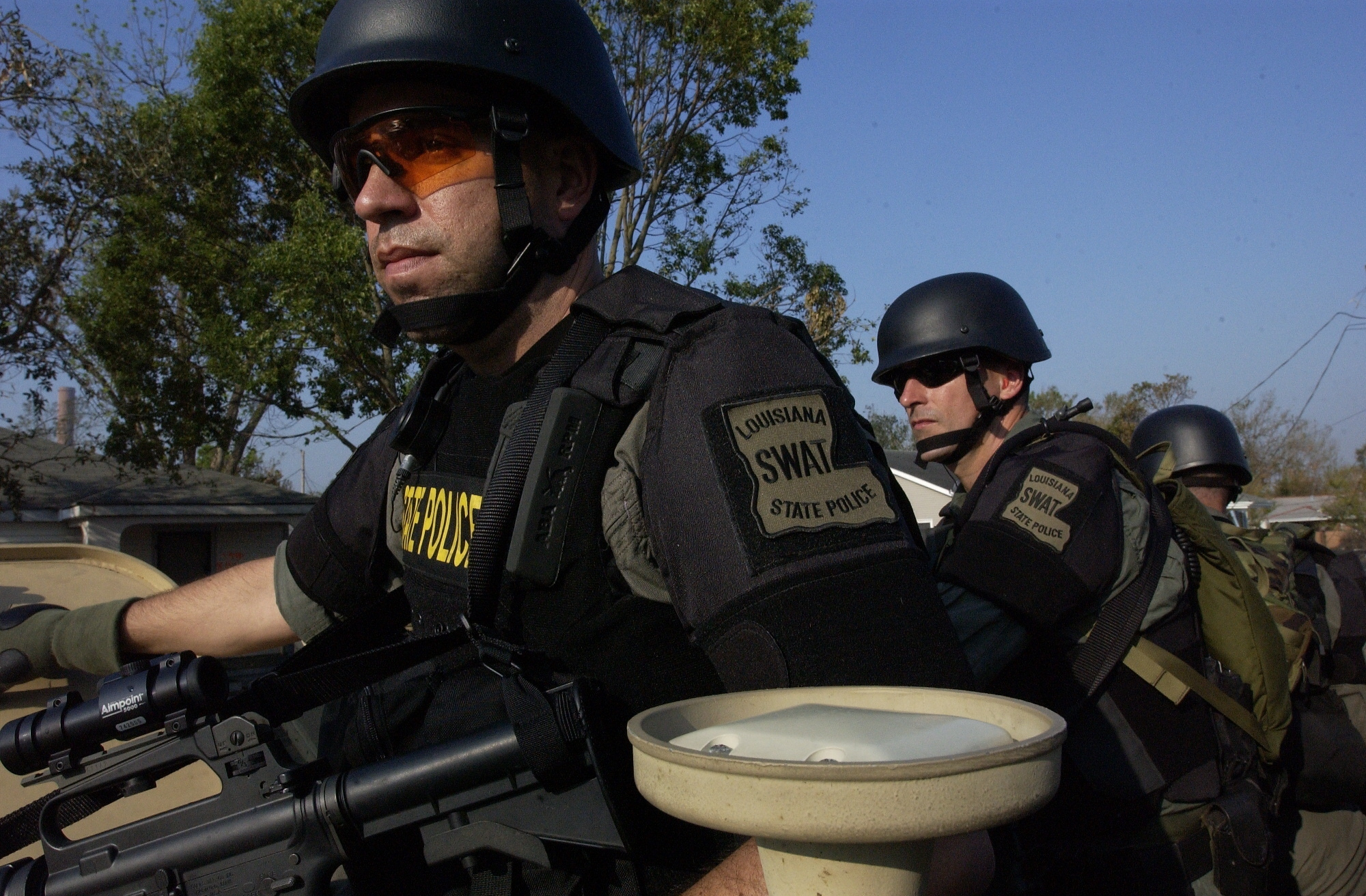
Members of Louisiana State Police SWAT Team in New Orleans assisting with Hurricane Katrina disaster relief efforts.

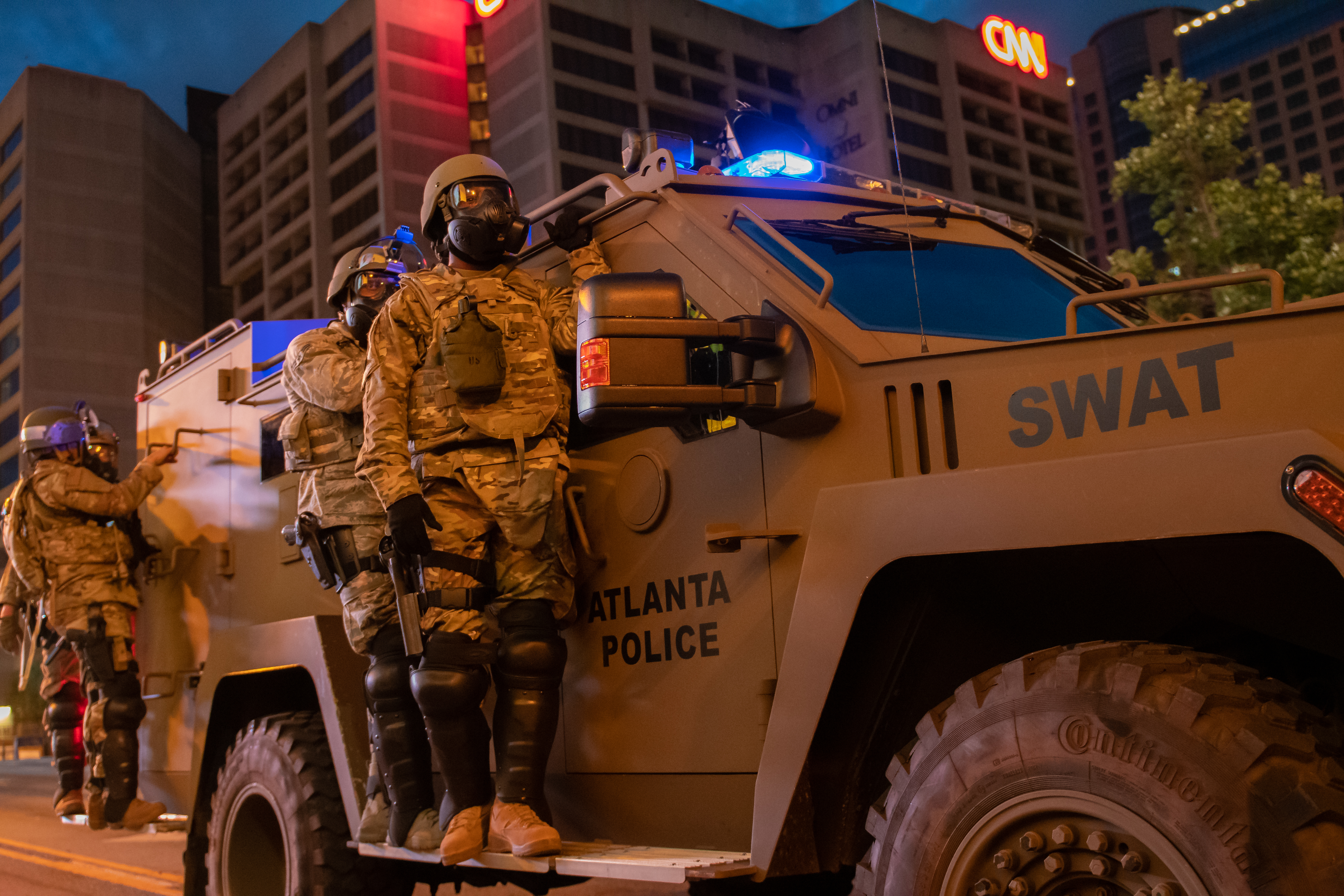
U.S. National Guard soldiers assist SWAT team members enforcing a curfew during the George Floyd protests in Atlanta, 2020

- 1973 Brooklyn hostage crisis
- Shannon Street massacre
- 1985 MOVE bombing
- North Hollywood shootout
- Hurricane Katrina disaster relief
- Virginia Tech shooting
- 2009 shootings of Oakland police officers
- 2009 shooting of Pittsburgh police officers
- Killing of Aiyana Jones
- Jose Guerena shooting
- Sandy Hook Elementary School shooting
- 2016 shooting of Dallas police officers
- Pulse nightclub shooting
- 2017 Las Vegas shooting
- Killing of Duncan Lemp
- Shooting of Jason Harley Kloepfer
- 2020 deployment of federal forces
- Uvalde school shooting

=== China ===
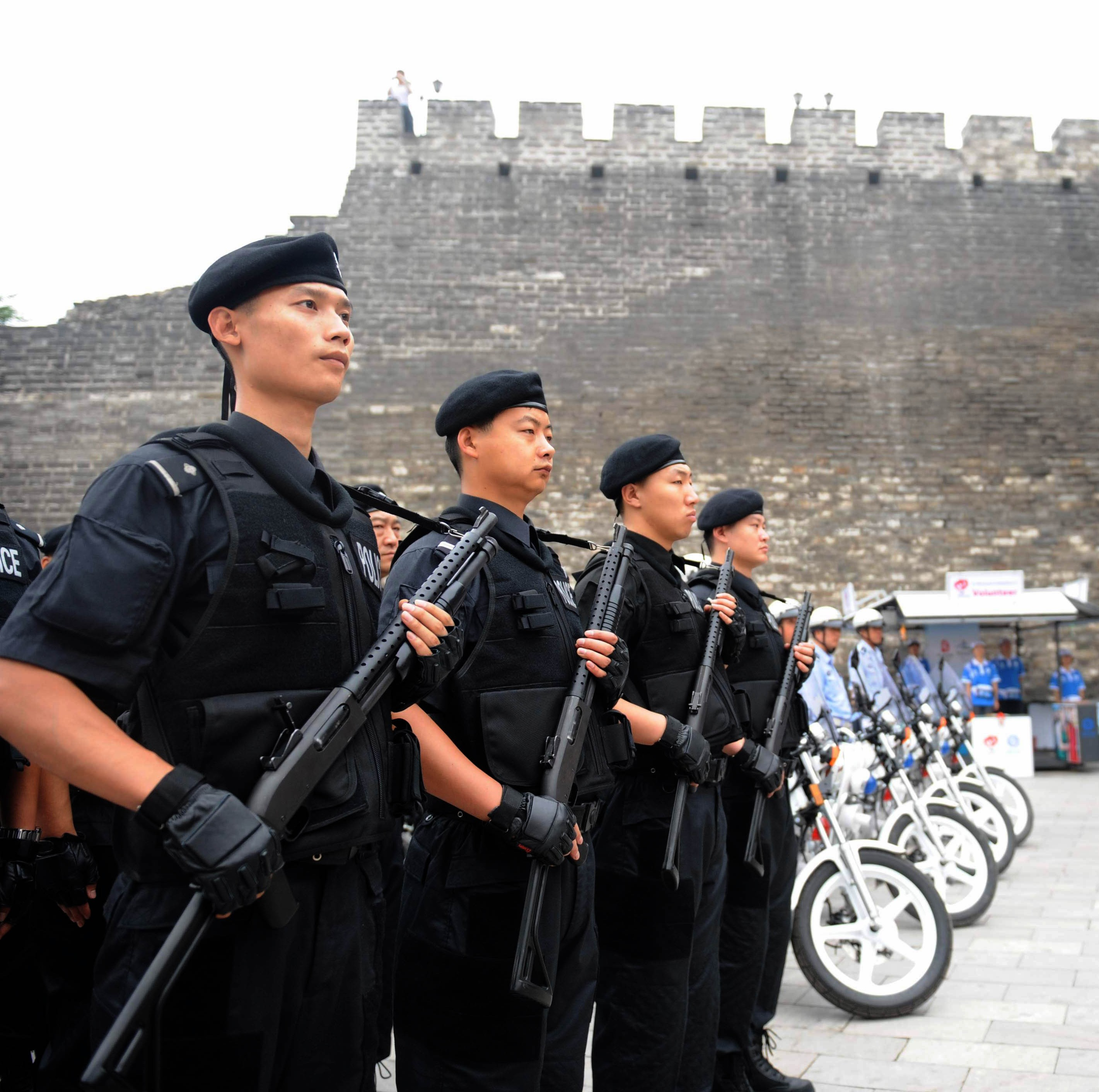
Beijing SWAT with Hawk industries Type 97 shotguns

- Arrest of Fa Ziying (Nanchang SWAT)
- Disaster relief after the 2008 Sichuan earthquake (Shenzhen SWAT)
- Yang Jia attacks (Zhabei SWAT)
- Security during the 2008 Beijing Olympics (Beijing SWAT)
- 2011 Hotan Attack (Hotan SWAT)
- 2013 Wo Shing Wo Dragonhead election raid (Shenzhen SWAT)
- June 2013 Shanshan riots (Shanshan County SWAT)
- 2014 Kunming attack (Kunming SWAT)
- 2018 Shangqiu Police-Chengguan clashes (Shangqiu SWAT)

== See also ==
- List of police tactical units
- Emergency service unit
- Special reaction team (U.S. military police)
- SWAT World Challenge
- Militarization of police
- Riot police
