= LAPD Public Disorder Intelligence Division =

Unit of the Los Angeles Police Department

The Public Disorder and Intelligence Division (PDID) was a unit of the Los Angeles Police Department between 1970–1983 that mobilized undercover officers to monitor the activity of local activist organizations suspected of criminal activity. Created by Chief Edward M. Davis and later overseen by Chief Daryl Gates, PDID was disbanded in 1983 amid public pressure.

== Operations ==
The operations included the infiltration of classes at California State University, Northridge.

=== Mayor Tom Bradley ===
In 1981, the Citizens Commission on Police Repression successfully sued the Los Angeles Police Department and consequently obtained documents detailing PDID’s spying campaign on then-mayor Tom Bradley. The intelligence reports, gathered by undercover officer Edward Camarillo, centered on whether or not Bradley intended on supporting the United Farm Workers’ upcoming boycott of Gallo wines.

=== Seymour Myerson ===
In 1982, the LAPD paid $27,500 in damages to Seymour Myerson, an architect who had been a target of the PDID. The department confirmed that Myerson had been under its surveillance for three years, and Myerson was “tailed” by PDID on a 1974 trip to a protest march. Detective Ruff admitted to phoning a false police report that Myerson had brandished a gun at his home in front of his children. Of that incident, Ruff said “That era was the Watergate era, and that was the practice.”

=== Detective Jay Paul ===
In 1983, Detective Jay Paul was under investigation for allegedly leaking PDID intelligence to the right-wing group Western Goals Foundation. An internal investigation confirmed that Paul kept PDID files at his home garage in Long Beach. Paul was suspended, but later reinstated with back pay, as his actions were sanctioned by his supervisors.

== Dissolution ==
In 1978, Citizens' Commission on Police Repression leaked an official list of over 200 organizations that had been subject to PDID's surveillance. The same year, activists from the Coalition Against Police Abuse, the Citizens' Commission on Police Repression, and the American Civil Liberties Union filed a lawsuit (CAPA et al. vs. Gates, et al.). This lawsuit was later consolidated to represent 23 groups and 108 individuals, charging that the LAPD illegally conducted spying operations based on political or ideological motivations.

Throughout the trial, more PDID intelligence targets became public knowledge. Amidst several other calls from Los Angeles residents and city officials, on January 17, 1983, City Attorney Ira Reiner submitted a proposal to the city's Police, Fire and Public Safety Committee that the PDID be disbanded. The Police Commission and city council formally dissolved the PDID on January 18, 1983.

CAPA et al. vs. Gates, et al. was settled for $1.8 million in early 1984.

== See also ==
- LAPD Red Squad – Municipal secret police
- Drug Abuse Resistance Education – US anti-drug educational program
