= Drug Abuse Resistance Education =

US anti-drug educational program

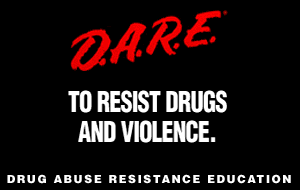
D.A.R.E. logo

Drug Abuse Resistance Education, or D.A.R.E., is an education program aimed to prevent the misuse of controlled drugs, membership in gangs, and violent behavior. It was founded in Los Angeles in 1983 under the direction of LAPD Chief of Police Daryl Gates. Its goal was to reduce the demand for illicit drugs as part of the broader American war on drugs.

The program was most prominent in the 1980s and 1990s. At the height of its popularity, D.A.R.E. was found in 75% of American school districts and was funded by the US government. The program consists of police officers who make visits to elementary school classrooms, warning children that drugs are harmful and should be refused. D.A.R.E. sought to educate children on how to resist peer pressure to take drugs. It also denounced alcohol, tobacco, graffiti, and tattoos as the results of peer pressure.

A series of scientific studies in the 1990s and 2000s cast doubt on the effectiveness of D.A.R.E., with some studies concluding the program was harmful or counterproductive. Years after its effectiveness was cast into doubt, the program remained popular among politicians and many members of the public, in part because of a common intuition that the program ought to work. Eventually, in the early 2000s, funding for the program was greatly reduced.

The program distributed T-shirts and other items branded with the D.A.R.E. logo and with anti-drug messages. These items were repurposed by drug culture as ironic statements starting in the 1990s.

Its American headquarters are in Inglewood, California. D.A.R.E. expanded to the United Kingdom in 1995. The program's mascot is Daren the Lion.

== History and purpose ==
The program was developed in 1983 on the initiative of Daryl Gates, chief of the Los Angeles Police Department, in collaboration with Harry Handler, superintendent of the Los Angeles Unified School District. A local program at first, D.A.R.E. spread rapidly in the 1980s. In 1988, Ronald Reagan proclaimed the first National D.A.R.E. Day. At the program's height, it was in 75% of American school districts. It was funded by the federal government in the Drug-Free Schools and Communities Act of 1986, which mentions D.A.R.E. by name. In 2002, D.A.R.E. had an annual budget of over $10 million.

D.A.R.E. program materials from 1991 describe it as "a drug abuse prevention education program designed to equip elementary school children with skills for resisting peer pressure to experiment with tobacco, drugs, and alcohol." It was created as a part of the war on drugs in the United States, with the intention of reducing the demand for drugs through education that would make drug use unappealing. The program was conducted by uniformed police officers who visited classrooms.

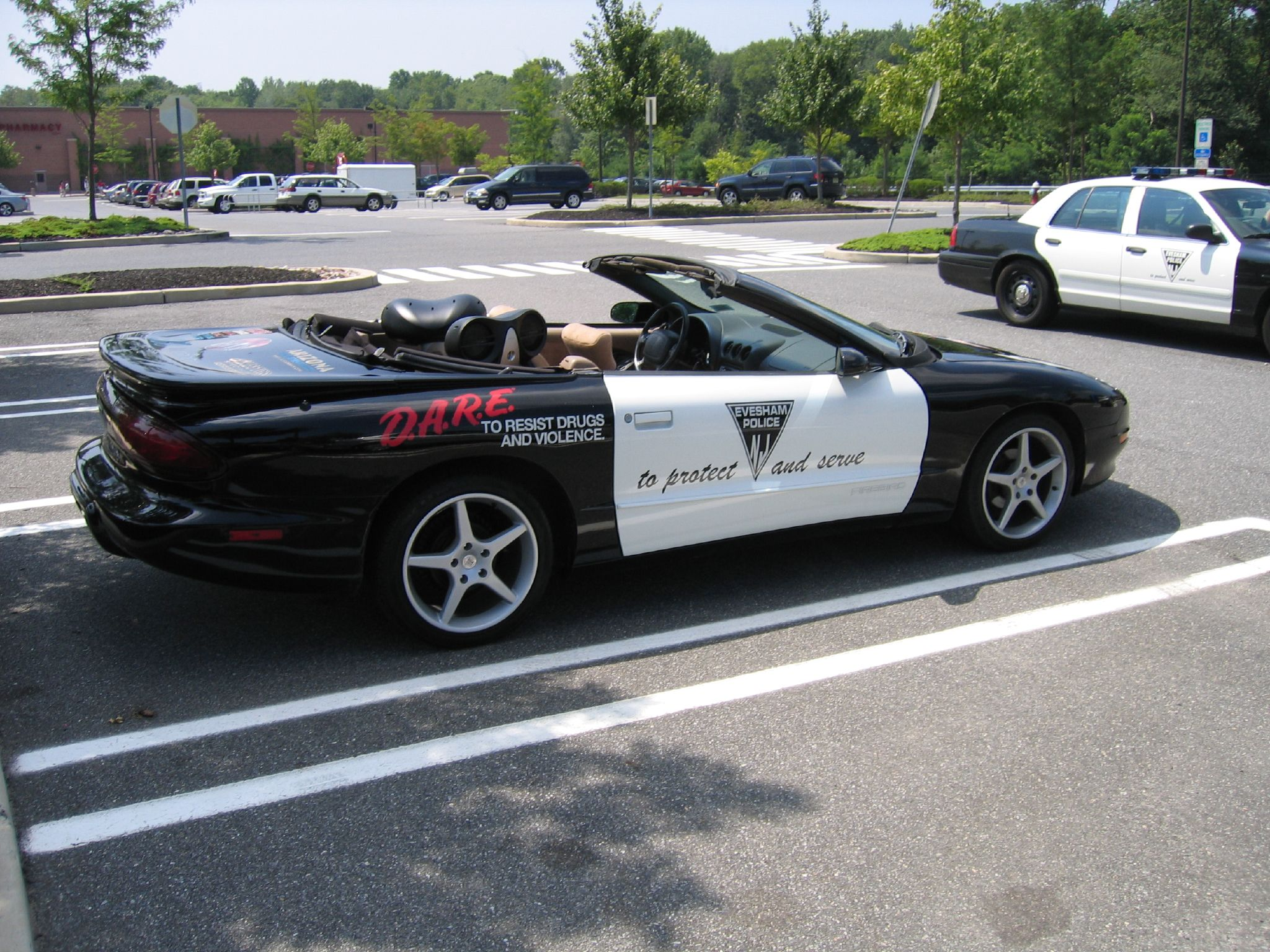
A Pontiac Firebird in D.A.R.E. livery in Evesham Township, New Jersey.

The curriculum consisted of lectures on the harmful consequences of drug and alcohol use, how to refuse drugs, building self-esteem and support networks, and alternatives to drugs. Curriculum also condemned graffiti and tattoos because they were considered to be the result of peer pressure. These lessons were derived from SMART, an anti-drug program under development at the University of Southern California, but they were adapted to be delivered by police officers instead of educators. Officers were also encouraged to spend time with students informally, such as playing basketball or chatting with students over lunch. Officers would sometimes arrive in sports cars that police had seized from drug dealers, which was intended to demonstrate that drugs lead to losing coveted possessions. Like school resource officers, D.A.R.E. was part of a trend of increasing police presence in schools. It also helped to improve the public image of law enforcement amid the war on drugs.

Scientific studies cast doubt on the effectiveness of D.A.R.E. starting in the early 1990s, with many concluding that D.A.R.E. did nothing to reduce illicit drug use. One study found that D.A.R.E. students were actually more likely to use drugs. Yet the program remained popular among politicians and many members of the public for decades, in part because of a common intuitive judgment that the program should work. Funding for D.A.R.E. was greatly reduced in the 2000s because of its poor performance at reducing drug use, particularly following a General Accounting Office report in 2003 which found "no significant differences in illicit drug use" caused by D.A.R.E.

After decades of antagonism toward D.A.R.E. because of its ineffectiveness, the organization adopted an externally-designed, evidence-supported curriculum in 2012. The new program is called "Keepin' it REAL" and focuses less on lectures and more on interactive activities, such as practicing refusal and saying no to pressure. It is now less explicitly focused on opposition to drugs, with the broader aim of teaching good decision-making. At least one study found that the new curriculum deters the beginning of alcohol use and vaping in students.

=== Use of children as informants ===
A 1991 case of an 11-year-old reporting her parents resulted in a suit against the police. The judgment against the officers described their actions as coercive, shocking, and "unworthy of constitutional protection".

Circa 1995, parents compared D.A.R.E. to the late Weimar Republic, in its installation of "uniformed, sometimes armed, agents of the state in classrooms to tell children what their attitudes ought to be, and to obtain information about family home life which may be of interest to the state".

Circa 2004, "[c]hildren [were] asked to submit to D.A.R.E. police officers sensitive written questionnaires that can easily refer to the kids' homes" and that "a D.A.R.E. lesson [was] called 'The Three R's: Recognize, Resist, Report'", encouraging children to "tell friends, teachers or police if they find drugs at home."

== Studies on effectiveness ==
=== 1992 – Indiana University ===
Researchers at Indiana University, commissioned by Indiana school officials in 1992, found that those who completed the D.A.R.E. program subsequently had significantly higher rates of hallucinogenic drug use than those not exposed to the program.

=== 1994 – RTI International ===
In 1994, three RTI International scientists evaluated eight previous quantitative analyses on D.A.R.E.'s efficacy that were found to meet their requirements for rigor. The researchers found that D.A.R.E.'s long-term effect could not be determined, because the corresponding studies were "compromised by severe control group attrition or contamination". However, the study concluded that in the short-term "DARE imparts a large amount of information, but has little or no impact on students' drug use", and that much smaller, interactive programs were more effective.

After the 1994 Research Triangle Institute study, an article in the New Times LA stated that the "organization spent $41,000 to try to prevent widespread distribution of the RTI report and started legal action aimed at squelching the study". The director of publication of the American Journal of Public Health told USA Today that "DARE has tried to interfere with the publication of this. They tried to intimidate us."

=== 1995 – California Department of Education ===
In 1995, a report to the California Department of Education by Joel Brown, stated that none of California's drug education programs worked, including D.A.R.E.: "California's drug education programs, D.A.R.E. being the largest of them, simply don't work. More than 40 percent of the students told researchers they were 'not at all' influenced by drug educators or programs. Nearly 70 percent reported neutral to negative feelings about those delivering the anti-drug message. While only 10 percent of elementary students responded to drug education negatively or indifferently, this figure grew to 33 percent of middle school students and topped 90 percent at the high school level." In some circles, educators and administrators have admitted that D.A.R.E., in fact, potentially increased students' exposure and knowledge of unknown drugs and controlled substances, resulting in experimentation and consumption of narcotics at a much younger age. Criticism focused on failure and misuse of taxpayer dollars, with either ineffective or negative results state-wide.

=== 1998 – National Institute of Justice ===
In 1998, a grant from the National Institute of Justice to the University of Maryland resulted in a report to the NIJ, which among other statements, concluded that "D.A.R.E. does not work to reduce substance use." D.A.R.E. expanded and modified the social competency development area of its curriculum in response to the report. Research by Dr. Dennis Rosenbaum in 1998 found that D.A.R.E. graduates were more likely than others to drink alcohol, smoke tobacco and use illegal drugs. Psychologist Dr. William Colson asserted in 1998 that D.A.R.E. increased drug awareness so that "as they get a little older, they (students) become very curious about these drugs they've learned about from police officers." The scientific research evidence in 1998 indicated that the officers were unsuccessful in preventing the increased awareness and curiosity from being translated into illegal use. The evidence suggested that, by exposing young impressionable children to drugs, the program was, in fact, encouraging and nurturing drug use. Studies funded by the National Institute of Justice in 1998, and the California Legislative Analyst's Office in 2000 also concluded that the program was ineffective.

=== 1999 – Lynam et al. ===
A ten-year study was completed by Donald R. Lynam and colleagues involving one thousand D.A.R.E. graduates in an attempt to measure the effects of the program. After the ten-year period, no measurable effects were noted. The researchers compared levels of alcohol, cigarette, marijuana and the use of illegal substances before the D.A.R.E. program (when the students were in sixth grade) with the post-D.A.R.E. levels (when they were 20 years old). Although there were some measured effects shortly after the program on the attitudes of the students towards drug use, these effects did not seem to carry on long-term.

=== 2001 – Office of the Surgeon General ===
In 2001, the Surgeon General of the United States, David Satcher, placed the D.A.R.E. program in the category of "Ineffective Primary Prevention Programs". The U.S. General Accounting Office concluded in 2003 that the program was sometimes counterproductive in some populations, with those who graduated from D.A.R.E. later having higher than average rates of drug use (a boomerang effect).

=== 2007 – Perspectives on Psychological Science ===
In March 2007, the D.A.R.E. program was placed on a list of treatments that have the potential to cause harm in clients in the APS journal, Perspectives on Psychological Science.

=== 2009 – Texas A&M ===
"The Social Construction of 'Evidence-Based' Drug Prevention Programs: A Reanalysis of Data from the Drug Abuse Resistance Education (DARE) Program," Evaluation Review, Vol. 33, No.4, 394–414 (2009). Studies by Dave Gorman and Carol Weiss argue that the D.A.R.E. program has been held to a higher standard than other youth drug prevention programs. Gorman writes, "what differentiates DARE from many of the programs on evidence-based lists might not be the actual intervention but rather the manner in which data analysis is conducted, reported, and interpreted." Dennis M. Gorman and J. Charles Huber Jr.

The U.S. Department of Education prohibits any of its funding to be used to support drug prevention programs that have not been able to demonstrate their effectiveness. Accordingly, D.A.R.E. America, in 2004, instituted a major revision of its curriculum.

In 2007 the U.S. Substance Abuse and Mental Health Services Administration (SAMHSA) has identified 66 alternative model programs, of which D.A.R.E. is not listed..

== Reception ==
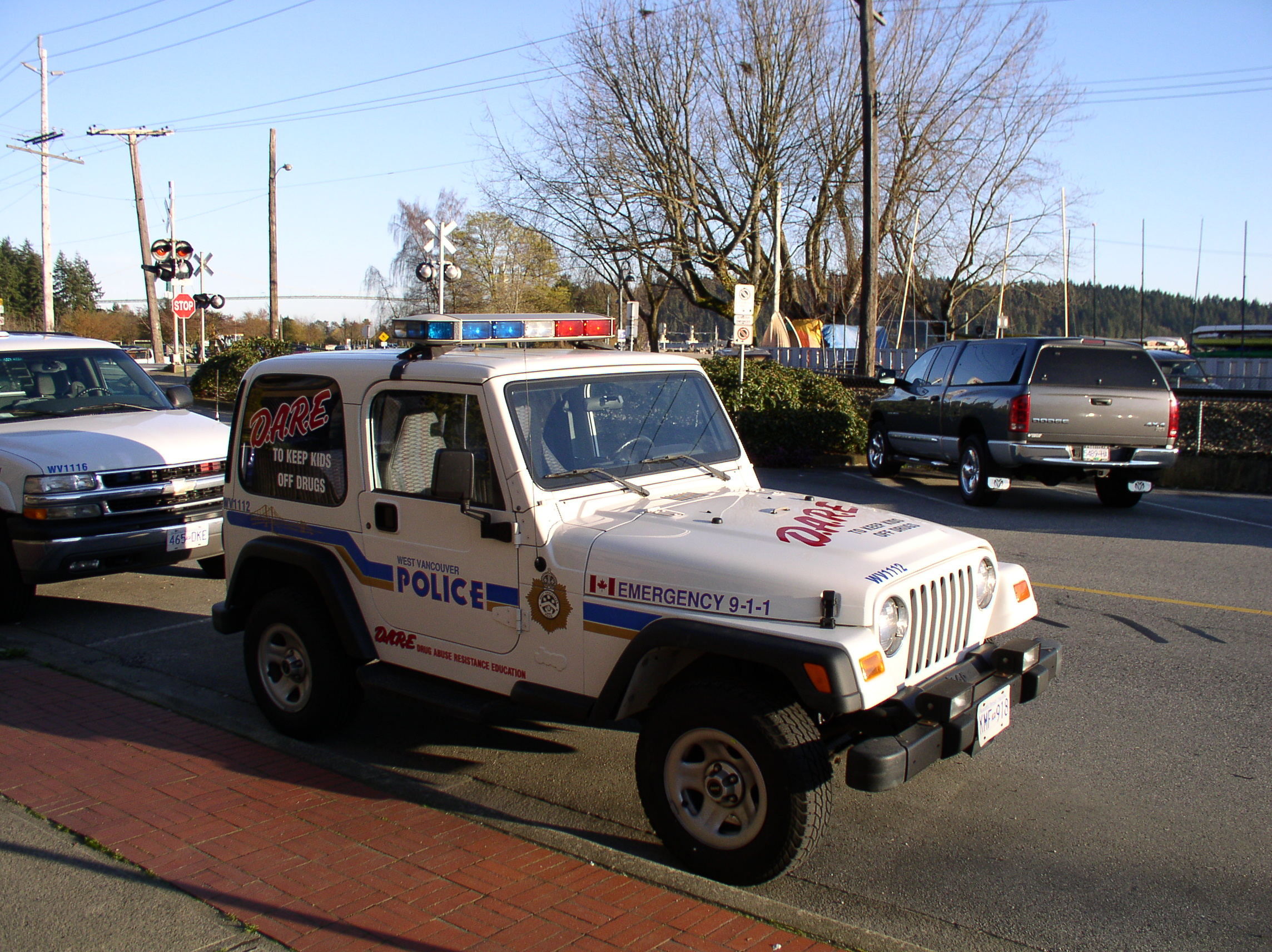
Police cruiser painted in D.A.R.E. colors

The D.A.R.E. program is consistent with the "zero-tolerance orthodoxy of current U.S. drug control policy." According to researcher D. M. Gorman of the Rutgers University Center of Alcohol Studies, it supports the ideology and the "prevailing wisdom that exists among policy makers and politicians."

It also claims to meet the needs of stake holders such as school districts, parents, and law enforcement agencies. "DARE America also has been very successful in marketing its program to the news media through a carefully orchestrated public relations campaign that highlights its popularity while downplaying criticism."

Psychologists at the University of Kentucky concluded that "continued enthusiasm [for DARE] shows Americans' stubborn resistance to apply science to drug policy."

Marsha Rosenbaum, who headed the West Coast office of the Lindesmith Center, a drug policy reform organization, provided an opinion for a 1999 Village Voice article, "In D.A.R.E.'s worldview, Marlboro Light cigarettes, Bacardi rum, and a drag from a joint are all equally dangerous. For that matter, so is snorting a few lines of cocaine." D.A.R.E. "isn't really education. It's indoctrination." The article also stated, "Part of what makes DARE so popular is that participants get lots of freebies. There are fluorescent yellow pens with the DARE logo, tiny DARE dolls, bumper stickers, graduation certificates, DARE banners for school auditoriums, DARE rulers, pennants, DARE coloring books, and T-shirts for all DARE graduates."

D.A.R.E. has failed to fact check some articles on their website, promoting one news piece that was satire, titled "Edible Marijuana Candies Kill 9 in Colorado, 12 at Coachella."

=== Responses to criticism ===
==== Motivation of the critics ====
D.A.R.E. America has generally dismissed many criticisms and independent studies of its program, labeling them false, misleading, or biased. "DARE has long dismissed criticism of its approach as flawed or the work of groups that favor decriminalization of drug use," according to the New York Times in 2001. In a press release titled "Pro-drug Groups Behind Attack on Prevention Programs; DARE Seen as Target as Mayors' Conference Called to Combat Legalization Threat," D.A.R.E. asserted that pro-drug legalization individuals and groups were behind criticisms of the program, which were portrayed as based on "vested interests" and "to support various individual personal agendas at the expense of our children."

D.A.R.E. has attacked critics for allegedly being motivated by their financial self-interest in programs that compete with D.A.R.E. It has charged that "they are setting out to find ways to attack our programs and are misusing science to do it. The bottom line is that they don't want police officers to do the work because they want it for themselves." Critics have also been dismissed as being jealous of D.A.R.E.'s success.

==== Rebuttal of statistics ====
Ronald J. Brogan, New York City's D.A.R.E. fundraiser and spokesman, said in 1999 "If you take German for 17 weeks, you're not going to speak German. The critics say the effect dissipates over the years. No shit, Sherlock." The article in which he was quoted observed that "DARE officials say the solution to this problem is not less DARE but more of it, and they urge cities to teach DARE in middle and high school."

One leader explained that "I don't have any statistics for you. Our strongest numbers are the numbers that don't show up." The 1998 University of Maryland report presented to the U.S. National Institute of Justice stated, "Officials of DARE America are often quoted as saying that the strong public support for the program is a better indicator of its utility than scientific studies."

==== New curriculum ====
In 2009, D.A.R.E. adopted the "keepin' it REAL" curriculum. Rather than solely focusing on the perils of alcohol and other drugs, keepin' it REAL developed a 10-lesson curriculum that included aspects of European American, Mexican American, and African American culture integrated with culturally based narration and performance. The program was developed by Penn State researchers, who evaluated its effectiveness, though critics contend the program does not implement a long-term evaluation system.

In 2013, the Substance Abuse and Mental Health Services Administration ranked its "readiness for dissemination" at 1.5 out of 4. Two field randomized controlled trials showed the effectiveness of the multicultural keepin' it REAL for reducing substance use across grade levels and ethnic/racial groups, which highlights the importance of grounding substance use prevention programs in their audiences' cultural attitudes, values, norms, and beliefs. The second study "evaluated onset of drug use across and within ethnic groups and the ideal times to intervene" finding "a double dose of intervention in elementary and middle school was no more effective than middle school intervention alone."

Following the passing of Washington Initiative 502 that legalized cannabis consumption in Washington state, the D.A.R.E. program was changed in the state to remove cannabis messages from their year 5 curriculum, arguing "research has found that teaching children about drugs with which they have never heard of or have no real life understanding may stimulate their interest or curiosity about the substance."

=== Ironic response ===
T-shirts and other merchandise reading "D.A.R.E. To Keep Kids Off Drugs" became popular as an ironic item in drug culture and other countercultures starting in the 1990s. According to a report from Vice, the program's appealing logo and acronym may unintentionally suggest one should dare to experiment with drugs.

== See also ==
- LAPD Public Disorder Intelligence Division
