= Coalition Against Police Abuse =

Los Angeles community organization

The Coalition Against Police Abuse (CAPA) is a currently active community organization in Los Angeles with the stated aim of organizing marginalized groups such as the poor, homosexuals, blacks, and Latinos to prevent, expose, and resist abuse by police and seek legal redress for such abuse.

== History and Basic Principles ==
The group was founded in the mid 1970s by Michael Zinzun who remained an important leader and personality within the group until his peaceful death in July 2006. Zinzun and many other members of the group were former low-ranking members of the Black Panther Party. The BPP left an important, and acknowledged, aesthetic and political legacy for members of CAPA but has never been viewed uncritically. Many members of CAPA believe that the Panther's vanguardist and patriarchal organizational methods weakened it. Many members believe this both: obstructed the harnessing of the power of ordinary members of the black community — and left the group overly vulnerable to decapitation by the government as various leaders were killed and imprisoned. CAPA aims at empowering those it serves and has adopted the motto "we will work with you, not for you." This means that when a person approaches CAPA with a complaint about police brutality CAPA will assist them and seek to empower the victim(s) to actively participate in their case and act as representatives to the community.

CAPA had a no-guns policy, and Zinzun would not let members of the BPP bring guns to a CAPA meeting.

== Gang Truce ==
CAPA, along with other organizations, has been instrumental in facilitating the LA Gang Truce and seeks to recruit gang members to redirect their energies from criminal activities that harm themselves and the community toward community activism.

== Allied Organizations ==
The organization is based in South Central LA and shares its headquarters with the Peace and Freedom Party. The organizations are distinct although there is a partial overlap in membership with both sets of members often interacting and cooperating. Since the early 1980s CAPA has maintained a close relationship with the ACLU which has often provided legal assistance to the group.
