= Police auction =

Auction of goods confiscated by police

A police auction is an auction of goods which have been confiscated by the police and cannot or may not be returned to their original owners. They may also contain surplus and retired police equipment, such as used police cars.

Police auctions may be found in most countries but differ in their format. In nations such as the United States, they are held by local police departments, and proceeds go to that vendor. In other countries, such as the United Kingdom, they are open to the public.

== United Kingdom ==
The Proceeds of Crime Act now allows for a court to confiscate any goods that a person can not legally account for. There are many thousands of such court orders issued each year, and items that can not be returned to their legal owner are auctioned off at local auction houses all over the UK.

The term 'Police Auction' has come to represent this category of auction sale although it is not technically correct. The police only sell lost and found items directly at auction. The correct term is Proceeds of Crime auctions as featured in the BBC documentary series Ill Gotten Gains. Proceeds of Crime auctions are an established route used by regional police forces across the country to dispose of proceeds of crime, lost and found, seized, and unclaimed stolen and confiscated property.

Items available at police auctions

- Cars and commercial vehicles
- Boats and yachts
- Building equipment
- Bicycles
- Household goods
- Jewellery and watches
- PlayStation consoles
- Business equipment
- Plant and machinery
- Proceeds of crime
- Plasma TVs and IPads

Police auctions are handled differently depending on the various police forces. Some authorities commission auctions through various contracted auctioneers. Others hold online auctions through various websites.

Lots at police auctions range from brand new or graded from A down in used condition, or goods may be slightly marked. All items listed in any police auction are available for viewing and inspection prior to the sale. Faulty or damaged goods should be clearly marked, and faults are outlined by the auctioneer during the auction.

== U.S. ==
Police auctions in the U.S. are often held onsite by the local police force, and are hosted by a professional auctioneer. A wide variety of merchandise is available.

About 300 Treasury auctions are held every year by the US Treasury Department. These are conducted throughout the U.S. and Puerto Rico, offering property forfeited as a result of violations of federal law or nonpayment of Internal Revenue Service taxes.

== New Zealand ==
Police auctions of unclaimed and lost property are held publicly across the country. Auctions will be organised locally were the item was located or surrendered. Police auctions are generally advertised in local papers or bidders can call the local police station to find out when one will take place.
