= Swat =

Swat or SWAT most often refers to:

- SWAT (special weapons and tactics), a paramilitary unit in law-enforcement agencies

Swat or SWAT may also refer to:

== Police tactical units ==
- SWAT (Regina), a tactical unit of the Regina Police Service
- SWAT (Bangladesh), a tactical unit of the Dhaka Metropolitan Police
- Beijing Special Weapons and Tactics Unit, a tactical unit of the Beijing Municipal Public Security Bureau
- Punjab Police SWAT Team, a tactical unit of the Punjab Police

== Places ==
- Swat (princely state), a former princely state in the present-day Swat and other surrounding districts
- Sultanate of Swat
- Swat District, a district in the Khyber Pakhtunkhwa province, Pakistan
- Swat River, a river in the Khyber Pakhtunkhwa province of Pakistan
- Swat Valley, valley in Pakistan
- Somerset West and Taunton, a former district of Somerset, England

== Film and television ==
- S.W.A.T. (1975 TV series), an American action crime series about a SWAT team
- S.W.A.T. (2003 film), a film based on the series
  - S.W.A.T. (soundtrack), the film's soundtrack album
- S.W.A.T.: Firefight, a 2011 direct-to-video sequel to the film
- S.W.A.T.: Under Siege, a third film in the series, released direct-to-video in 2017
- S.W.A.T. (2017 TV series), a series based on the 1975 television series and 2003 feature film
- S.W.A.T. (2019 film), a Mandarin-language Chinese film
- S.W.A.T. Exiles, a sequel/spin-off of the 2017 TV series

== Video games ==
- SWAT, a 1984 arcade game developed by Coreland and distributed by Sega
- SWAT subseries of the Police Quest series, composed of:
  - Police Quest: SWAT, a 1995 game
  - Police Quest: SWAT 2, a 1998 game
  - SWAT 3: Close Quarters Battle, a 1999 game
  - SWAT: Global Strike Team, a 2003 game
  - SWAT 4, a 2005 game
  - SWAT Force, a 2006 game
  - SWAT: Target Liberty, a 2007 game
  - SWAT Elite Troops, a 2007 game

== Other uses ==
- Swat, to bat away a nuisance, as with a fly swatter
- Block (basketball) or swat, a defensive play
- SWAT (magazine), an American firearms and law enforcement monthly
- Samba Web Administration Tool (SWAT)
- Samoan SWAT Team, a former pro wrestling tag team and its different variations
- SWAT model (Soil & Water Assessment Tool), a river basin scale model

== See also ==
- Akhund of Swat, a prominent religious Mullah or priest, and Emir of the former Yusufzai State of Swat
- Swatting, a hoax intended to provoke a response from SWAT or other emergency personnel
- SWATS (Southwest Atlanta, too strong), a term referencing Atlanta hip hop culture
- Swot (disambiguation)
- Swati (disambiguation)
- Battle of Swat (disambiguation)
