= Safwat =

Safwat is a unisex given name and surname of Arabic origin. Notable people with the name include:

== Given name ==
- Safwat Ghayur (1959–2010), Pakistani police officer
- Safwat Hegazi (born 1963), Egyptian imam and television preacher, banned from the UK for stirring-up hatred
- Safwat al-Din Khatun (died 1295), known as Padishah Khatun, ruler of Kirman in Persia from 1291 until 1295
- Safwat al-Mulk (died 1119), Seljuk noblewoman
- Safwat El-Sherif (1933–2021), former Egyptian politician, former speaker of the Egyptian Shura Council
- Jehan Safwat Raouf (1933–2021), widow of Anwar Sadat, First Lady of Egypt from 1970 to 1981

== Surname ==
- Ahmed Safwat (1947–2003), former Egyptian professional squash player
- Mahmoud Safwat (1929–2015), intelligence officer and Olympic gymnast
- Mohamed Safwat (born 1990), Egyptian tennis player

== See also ==
- Safwat al-safa, a hagiography of the Sufi shaykh Safi-ad-din Ardabili (1252–1334), founder of the Safaviya Sufi order
- SFWA (disambiguation)
- Safat
- Swat (disambiguation)
