= Swati =

Swati may refer to

== Films ==
- Swati or Swathi (1984 film), an Indian Telugu-language film
- Swati (1986 film), a 1986 Indian Hindi-language romantic drama film

== Other uses ==
- Swati language (disambiguation), several languages with the name
- Swazi people, an ethnic group of southern Africa
- Swatis, an ethnic group of Hazara division, Pakistan
- Swati or Svati, a star in ancient Sanskrit scriptures

== Persons with the name ==
- Abdul Hameed Swati (1917–2008), Pakistani Islamic scholar
- Azam Khan Swati (born 1947), Pakistani politician and businessman
- Babar Saleem Swati, Pakistani politician
- Riffat Akbar Swati (born 1946), member of the provincial assembly
- Swati Dandekar (born 1951), state representative of Iowa
- Swati Kaushal, Indian writer
- Swati Mia Saini, American financial journalist and video host
- Swati Maliwal, Indian activist
- Swati Popat Vats, Indian educationist and author
- Swati Reddy, Indian TV host and actress
- Swati (field hockey) (born 1990), Indian field hockey player

== See also ==
- Swathi (disambiguation)
- Swat (disambiguation)
- Operations against the Mohmands, Bunerwals and Swatis in 1915
- Swati Mutyam or Swathi Muthyam, a 1986 Indian Telugu-language drama film by K. Viswanath
- Swati Kiranam or Swathi Kiranam, a 1992 Indian Telugu-language musical drama film by K. Viswanath
