= Battle of Swat =

Battle of Swat may refer to these battles in Swat District, Pakistan during the insurgency in Khyber Pakhtunkhwa:

- First Battle of Swat (2007–2009), between the Pakistan Army and Taliban militants
- Second Battle of Swat (2009), between the Pakistan Army and Taliban militants

== See also ==
- Battle of Swatow (disambiguation)
- Swat (disambiguation)
