= Los Angeles Metro (disambiguation) =

Los Angeles Metro is the agency that plans, operates, and coordinates funding for most of the transportation system in Los Angeles County, California, the most populated county in the United States.

Los Angeles Metro may also refer to:

- Los Angeles Metro Rail
- Metrolink (California)
- Los Angeles metropolitan area
- LAPD Metropolitan Division - a division of the Los Angeles Police Department
