= SWAT: Global Strike Team =

2003 video game

- Developer: Argonaut Games
- Publisher: Vivendi Universal Games (Note: Released under the Sierra Entertainment brand.)
- Producer: Sefton Hill
- Designer: Paul Crocker
- Programmer: Matt Porter
- Artist: Jean-François Vanelle
- Writer: Mike Kitson
- Composer: Nick Arundel
- Series: Police Quest
- Engine: OKRE
- Platforms: PlayStation 2, Xbox
- Release: NA: October 28, 2003; EU: December 5, 2003
- Genre: Tactical shooter
- Modes: Single-player, multiplayer

SWAT: Global Strike Team is a 2003 tactical shooter video game developed by Argonaut Games and published by Vivendi Universal Games for the PlayStation 2 and Xbox. It featured a new game engine developed by Argonaut developed to push the lighting capabilities of the Xbox and was the first SWAT game to ship on console systems. The game was inspired by the strategic elements of SWAT 3 with the instantly accessible arcade action of the Virtua Cop series.

SWAT: Global Strike Team received mixed reviews and was compared unfavorably to contemporary tactical shooters such as Tom Clancy's Rainbow Six 3 and SOCOM II U.S. Navy SEALs. Poor sales contributed to the closure of developer Argonaut in 2004.

A ninth game in the series, SWAT 4, returned the series to its roots as a tactical police simulation for the PC in 2005.

== Synopsis ==
This is the first Police Quest: SWAT game not based on an actual police organization or present-day SWAT tactics. The game features non-white and female protagonists in deliberate contrast to the original Police Quest games, which were criticized for their sexist and racist overtones.

=== Setting ===
Founded in 2008, the Global Strike Team is a fictional paramilitary law enforcement agency tasked with helping countries and organizations around the globe to resolve situations they cannot accomplish successfully on their own.

=== Plot ===
Former Delta Force member Mathias Kincaid is an element leader paired with two first lieutenants, a sniper named Kana Lee, and Anthony "TJ" Jackson, a field technician. Together, they take on a pair of rival narco-terrorist organizations, the Omega Cartel and the Whispering Dragon Clan, who are engaged in a bitter turf war over the production and distribution of a deadly new designer drug, LD-50 — nicknamed "Spike."

== Gameplay ==
SWAT: Global Strike Team is a first-person shooter played with two AI teammates.

Unlike military shooters, such as the comparable Rainbow Six games, the player and teammates are cops rather than soldiers. A compliance meter shows how close suspects are to giving up. Before lethal force may be used, players must follow correct procedure, including using verbal commands for suspects to give up their weapons and submit to arrest. Beyond that, SWAT: Global Strike Team is a significant departure from the SWAT series. It leaves many of the tactical simulation elements behind while simplifying others in favor of a much more straightforward action game experience.

=== Modes ===
SWAT: Global Strike Team is designed around one campaign mode with 21 linear story-based missions. A time-based game mode adds replayability, putting a time-limit on the campaign. Taking down enemies increases time on the clock. Multiplayer is limited. Both console versions include 10 unique co-op missions. Xbox versions of the game include online leaderboard support and two single-player deathmatch levels which can be downloaded via Xbox Live. Online support via Xbox Live was available to players until April 15, 2010. SWAT: Global Strike Team is now supported online on the replacement Xbox Live servers called Insignia.

=== Characters ===
Most missions are played in the role of element leader Mathias Kincaid, assisted by the sniper Kana Lee and demolitions man "T.J." Jackson. Some essential tasks such as breaching doors or picking locks are character-specific. Occasionally, the player takes on these secondary roles. For example, the player will briefly control the sniper to clear out a landing zone. If any of the primary characters die, the mission is a failure and restarted from the last checkpoint.

=== Loadout ===
The player chooses a loadout before each mission. The choices are straightforward, such as machine gun or shotgun, and include non-lethal options like flashbangs and tranquilizer darts. Unlike its predecessor, no real weapons or trademarks are used.

== Development ==
SWAT: Global Strike Team started off as a top-down turn-based action game for the Dreamcast codenamed "Kleaners" where the player controlled a squad of professional killers. When Sega's console stalled in the market, development shifted to the Xbox where the game quickly moved towards being a first-person shooter with two semi-autonomous characters — a sharp-shooting assassin and a tech specialist able to hack security systems.

The graphic engine was designed from the ground-up for the Xbox which gave "Kleaners" a distinct look and feel, including hard-edged shadows, allowing for an almost limitless number of lights and shadows in any given scene, and a photo-realistic film filter that gave the game a true-to-life look.

Sierra took notice of the "Kleaners" demo at the Electronic Entertainment Expo in 2001 and soon thereafter, made a deal with Argonaut to make SWAT games for next-gen console systems based on the game concept.

SWAT: Global Strike Team was formally announced as an Xbox exclusive in October 2001, riding the excitement in the weeks ahead of the system's launch.

The game shone in early previews. "Graphically, Global Strike Team is surprisingly high-quality", said Brad Shoemaker of GameSpot. "The levels and character models themselves are pretty solid, and the visuals convey quite a bit of atmosphere thanks to a really impressive indoor and outdoor lighting effect." The controls were well-tuned, with aiming and movement compared to the console first-person standard set by Halo: Combat Evolved.

Voice command of AI teammates was touted as a major feature, intended to take advantage of the Xbox Live Communicator microphone that had become a popular accessory with the launch of Xbox Live in 2002. Voice could be used to directly influence the action onscreen with shouted commands such as "SWAT! Get down!," intended to achieve a new level of realism and immersion or to replicate D-pad commands. SWAT: Global Strike Team and Tom Clancy's Rainbow Six 3 were the first to ship with this feature which used the Xbox Development Kit's voice recognition technology added in 2003.

== Marketing ==
Promotion included the release of a SWAT: Global Strike Team mixtape from DJ Whoo Kid and Lloyd Banks in partnership with Sierra's parent Vivendi and Universal Music Group.

== Reception ==
Reception

Aggregate score
Aggregator	Score	
Aggregator	PS2	Xbox
Metacritic	69/100	69/100

Review scores
Publication	Score	
Publication	PS2	Xbox
Edge	N/A	6/10
Electronic Gaming Monthly	5/10	5/10
Eurogamer	6/10	6/10
Famitsu	N/A	28/40
Game Informer	7/10	7.5/10
GamePro	3.5/5	N/A
GameSpot	8.1/10	8.1/10
GameSpy	3/5	3/5
GameZone	7.5/10	7/10
IGN	6.6/10	6.6/10
Official U.S. PlayStation Magazine	3/5	N/A
Official Xbox Magazine (US)	N/A	7.7/10

Reception ranged from positive to mixed. GameSpot gave the Xbox version of the game an 8.1 of 10, calling it "an impressive and successful effort to bring the old series into the 21st century". Other critics called the game as too little, too late amidst a field of tactical shooters that had become very crowded, very quickly. "SWAT: Global Strike Team was initially going to be a bit of a twist on the old squad-based tactical shooter genre", said IGN's Aaron Boulding. "But in the time since it was announced for PS2 and Xbox and its recent arrival on those systems, other titles like SOCOM and Rainbow Six 3 have surpassed and improved on what SWAT: GST set out to do."

The launch of SWAT: Global Strike Team was misfortunately timed. Tom Clancy's Rainbow Six 3 arrived the same day in North America and SOCOM II U.S. Navy SEALs launched the following week. Both received widespread critical acclaim and would set franchise records. By the time Counter-Strike Xbox edition arrived in the Holiday 2003 release slot previously held by Halo 2, SWAT: Global Strike Team was fading quickly from retail.

In Japan, where the Xbox version was ported and published by Microsoft on December 16, 2004, Famitsu gave it a score of all four sevens for a total of 28 out of 40.

== Legacy ==
=== Argonaut Closure ===
Argonaut was under financial pressure during the development of SWAT: Global Strike Team. Much was staked on the game's success. The poor sales of the game led to deepening losses, which would ultimately prove unsustainable and contributed to the studio's closure in November 2004.

=== SWAT: Urban Justice cancellation and SWAT 4 ===
SWAT: Urban Justice was to be a PC-only SWAT game to launch in 2003. Like SWAT: Global Strike Team, the game would be supported by a brand-new game engine and would have a faster, action-oriented pace. The poor reception to SWAT: Global Strike Team reduced confidence in the project which was already suffering from internal delays. The game was ultimately cancelled. The SWAT series would ultimately resume in 2005 with SWAT 4 which used the same game engine as Rainbow Six and Splinter Cell, and was a more realistic law enforcement simulation.
