= Tueller Drill =

Close-range threat drill

The Tueller Drill is a situational awareness and reaction-time exercise designed to illustrate the danger posed by an attacker armed with a melee weapon at close range, that underscores how quickly a close-range threat can escalate. Tueller did his tests and studies at 21 feet (6.4 metres, 7 yards) because it was already common for officers to train to shoot from this distance. Tueller found that a person would be in danger if an attacker came at him from this distance. According to NRA publication Shooting Illustrated, the Tueller Drill evolved into a "21-foot rule," which is the idea that an attacker can close a distance of 21 feet within 1.5 seconds, and that therefore 1.5 seconds is generally taken to be the minimum response time facing a threat.

== History ==
Sergeant Dennis Tueller of the Salt Lake City Police Department wondered how quickly an attacker with a knife, or other melee weapon, could cover 21 feet (6.4 m), so he timed volunteers as they raced to stab the target. He determined that it could be done in 1.5 seconds. These results were first published as an article in SWAT magazine in 1983 and in a police training video by the same title, "How Close Is Too Close?"

The "21-foot rule" has been implemented in some police department policies, and was the focus of a dissent in the excessive force case Buchanan v. City of San Jose where police officers shot a knife wielding person at a distance of 55 feet.

MythBusters covered the drill in the 2012 episode "Duel Dilemmas". At 20 ft (6.1 m), the gun-wielder was able to shoot the charging knife attacker just as he reached the shooter. At shorter distances the knife wielder was always able to stab prior to being shot.

== Drills ==
A defender with a weapon has a dilemma. If he shoots too early, he risks being accused of murder. If he waits until the attacker is definitely within striking range so there is no question about motives, he risks injury and even death. The Tueller experiments quantified a "danger zone" where an attacker presented a clear threat.

The Tueller Drill combines both parts of the original time trials by Tueller. There are several ways it can be conducted:

1. The (simulated) attacker and shooter are positioned back-to-back. At the signal, the "attacker" sprints away from the shooter, and the shooter unholsters his gun and shoots at the target 21 feet (6.4 m) in front of him. The attacker stops as soon as the shot is fired. The shooter is successful only if his shot is good and if the runner did not cover 21 feet (6.4 m).
2. A more stressful arrangement is to have the attacker begin 21 feet (6.4 m) behind the shooter and run towards the shooter. The shooter is successful only if he was able take a good shot before he is tapped on the back by the attacker.
3. If the shooter is armed with only a training replica gun, a full-contact drill may be done with the attacker running towards the shooter. In this variation, the shooter should practice side-stepping the attacker while he is drawing the gun.
