= Swati language (disambiguation) =

Swati language or siSwati or Swazi is a Bantu language of the Nguni group spoken in Eswatini and South Africa by the Swazi people.

Swati language may also refer to:

- Torwali language, a language spoken in Swat, Khyber Pakhtunkhwa Province, Pakistan
- Kalami language, a language spoken in Swat, Khyber Pakhtunkhwa Province, Pakistan
- Swati, a dialect of the Pashto language spoken in Swat, Khyber Pakhtunkhwa Province, Pakistan
- Swati, a dialect of the Gujari language spoken in Swat, Khyber Pakhtunkhwa Province, Pakistan
- Swati, a dialect of the Hindko language spoken in Swat, Khyber Pakhtunkhwa Province, Pakistan

== See also ==
- Swati (disambiguation)
