= Police Quest: SWAT =

1995 video game

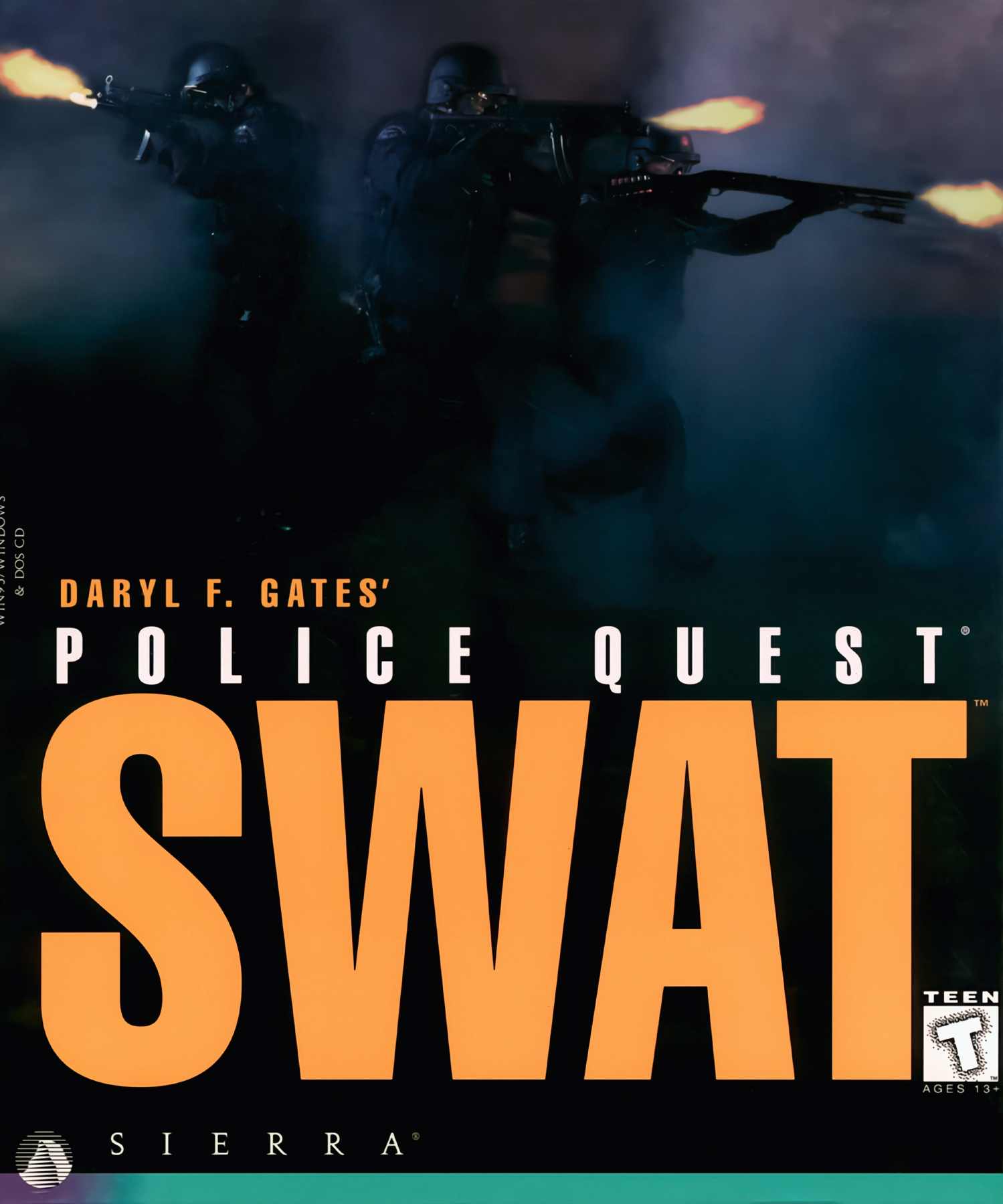
- Developer: Sierra On-Line
- Publisher: Sierra On-Line
- Director: Tammy Dargan
- Producers: Tammy Dargan; Phy Williams
- Designer: Tammy Dargan
- Programmers: Randy MacNeill; Sean Mooney
- Artist: Terry Robinson
- Writer: Tammy Dargan
- Composer: Dan Kehler
- Series: Police Quest
- Platforms: DOS, Windows (3.x/95), Mac OS
- Release: NA: November, 1995
- Genres: Adventure, Simulation
- Mode: Single-player

Police Quest: SWAT, alternatively known as Daryl F. Gates' Police Quest: SWAT or Police Quest 5: SWAT, is a 1995 graphic adventure educational video game developed and published by Sierra On-Line for DOS, Microsoft Windows, and Mac OS. It is the fifth installment in the Police Quest series and the first installment in the SWAT subseries. The game follows a Los Angeles Police Department (LAPD) Metropolitan Division SWAT team as they train to handle high-risk criminal incidents across Los Angeles.

Police Quest: SWAT received negative reviews from critics, but was a commercial success, with sales of over 1 million units by March 2000. A sequel, Police Quest: SWAT 2, was released in 1998. The game has since been re-released digitally through GOG.com and Steam.

== Gameplay ==
Police Quest: SWAT follows the members of a police tactical unit. The game is presented through a series of interactive full-motion videos. Gameplay is primarily point-and-click. The player can use their character's LASH radio to issue commands or call for assistance using verbs and nouns. The player also has an inventory where their weapons and equipment are stored.

The vast majority of the game consists of training exercises and lectures at the Los Angeles Police Academy in Elysian Park, serving to educate the player on police tactics and knowledge necessary during missions. Only three missions are in the game, unlocked as the player progresses through training. To provide replay value and tense unpredictability, the missions are lengthy and come in several variations; for example, a suspect may ambush the player in one mission playthrough, but they may attempt to hide in a subsequent replay. In the final mission, the player is issued a role they chose during training: element leader, allowing the player to issue commands and direct the team; or sniper, allowing the player to cover the rest of the team, though they must account for randomized wind effects.

As is standard for the Police Quest series, following orders, police policy, rules of engagement, and realism are critical factors in gameplay. Most crucially, the SWAT team is advised to arrest suspects alive rather than kill them, unless the suspect is attempting to harm them or others. In some mission variations, the player must negotiate with an otherwise dangerous suspect to de-escalate the threat, even when shooting would be justifiable. Actions deemed contrary to these can result in reprimands, negative consequences, or a game over.

== Plot ==
The player character, "SWAT Pup", joins the LAPD Metropolitan Division's D Platoon, SWAT. Pup is introduced to the other members of the team, trains with SWAT's weaponry, and attends lectures on tactics, equipment, and procedure.

After introductory training, SWAT is deployed to apprehend Lucy Long, a mentally unstable elderly woman suffering from delusions, who has barricaded herself in her family's North Hollywood house with a handgun under the belief she is being gang stalked. SWAT is tasked with coercing her to come out and surrender, or if not, moving in on the house to apprehend her. Based on the events that unfold and what SWAT Pup does and orders, Long may either be arrested, killed, kill an officer, or commit suicide.

Later, SWAT is deployed to apprehend an armed burglar hiding in a warehouse in Central Los Angeles. The burglar shot an officer investigating the building and, based on the testimony of the warehouse's owners, may have taken warehouse employee Hector Martinez hostage. SWAT methodically searches the building to locate the burglar. The burglar may either be arrested, killed, or kill an officer, and Martinez may be rescued, killed, or not be present to begin with.

Finally, after extensive training, SWAT is deployed to stop a terrorist attack and attempted bombing at the offices of Eastman Enterprises, a plastic producer and government contractor in Southeast Los Angeles. The owner, Mr. Eastman, faced protests and threats over his connections to the military–industrial complex. SWAT Pup is assigned a role and SWAT deploys to defeat the terrorists and defuse the bomb. The terrorists may be arrested, killed, kill an officer, or succeed in the bombing.

== Development ==
Police Quest: SWAT is built on Sierra Creative Interpreter 2, used in the previous Police Quest game, Open Season, and other adventure games of the era such as Phantasmagoria and Gabriel Knight 2. It uses a single cursor interface similar to these and other SCI2 games, such as King's Quest VII. The game uses much of the same technology as Open Season: most backgrounds are scanned photographs with green screen actors (with sprites being used in many places), but with much more use of FMVs.

The game is listed as Police Quest 5 (PQ5) in the file names, folder, the credits, and as part of its listing in the second Police Quest Collection; however, the numbering does not actually appear in the game.

== Release ==
Police Quest: SWAT was released on September 30, 1995 in North America. Due to the amount of FMV data it required, the game was stored on four CD-ROMs.

Digital download editions of Police Quest: SWAT were released on GOG.com in the Police Quest Collection Series collection (along with the first four games in the series), the SWAT Career Pack (with all six Police Quest games), the Police Quest: SWAT Force pack (the first two SWAT games), and later the Police Quest: SWAT Generation collection (with SWAT 2 and SWAT 3), and in Police Quest: SWAT 1 & 2. The game was re-released on Steam in 2016.

== Reception ==
Reception

Review scores
Publication	Score
Next Generation	2/5
PC Gamer (US)	70%
PC Zone	83/100
Computer Game Review	62/61/80
PC Games	C

A reviewer for Next Generation criticized the mission instructions as overly ambiguous, sometimes leading the player to receive a reprimand even after apparently following orders correctly. He praised the large amount of content, educational value, and digitized audio, but scored the game two out of five stars, concluding that "this is a decent attempt at a police simulation, but your lack of control leaves much to be desired."

PC Zone offered the game a "Recommended" rating, and a writer for the magazine called it "gun-toting cop fun".

=== Sales ===
According to Sierra On-Line, combined sales of the Police Quest series—including Police Quest: SWAT—surpassed 1.2 million units by the end of March 1996. Police Quest: SWAT was a commercial success; SWAT 3's Jim Napier later wrote that it "received only marginal reviews, [... but] sold like crazy." Between January 1998 and July 1998 alone, it sold 152,425 copies and earned $1,622,405 in the United States. Its sales that year ultimately totaled 253,128 units, which brought in revenues of $2.73 million and made SWAT the country's 17th best-selling game of the year. The game's overall sales topped 1 million copies by March 2000.
