= SWOT =

SWOT may refer to:

- SWOT (manga), a Japanese media franchise
- Cramming (education) or swotting
- SWOT analysis, a method to evaluate strengths, weaknesses, opportunities and threats to identify risks and issues that need solving
- Surface Water and Ocean Topography (SWOT), a NASA/CNES satellite altimeter
- Small-town swot

== See also ==
- Swat (disambiguation)
