= SWAT: Target Liberty =

2007 video game

- Developer: 3G Studios
- Publisher: Vivendi Games (Note: Released under the Sierra Entertainment brand name)
- Series: Police Quest
- Platform: PlayStation Portable
- Release: NA: October 16, 2007; AU: October 25, 2007; EU: October 26, 2007
- Genres: Third-person shooter, tactical shooter
- Modes: Single-player, multiplayer

SWAT: Target Liberty is a 2007 tactical shooter video game developed by 3G Studios and published by Vivendi Games exclusively for the PlayStation Portable.

== Story ==
The story takes place in New York City as SWAT officer Kurt Wolfe, at first, was assigned to take down renewed Asian gang violence led by ethnic Korean-Americans. But later on, he and his team discover that terrorist forces are planning to pin the blame on the North Korean government for the explosion of a nuclear weapon on American soil.

Players take command of Officer Kurt Wolfe and can take two additional members to every mission.

== Gameplay ==
Target Liberty features an isometric perspective, similar to Police Quest: SWAT 2, though the game leans toward a more arcade-like experience to better fit a handheld system.

== Reception ==
Reception

Aggregate score
| Aggregator | Score |
|---|---|
| Metacritic | 50/100 |

Review scores
| Publication | Score |
|---|---|
| Eurogamer | 4/10 |
| Game Informer | 5/10 |
| GamePro | 1/5 |
| GameSpot | 5.5/10 |
| GameSpy | 2/5 |
| GameZone | 5/10 |
| IGN | 4.5/10 |
| PlayStation Official Magazine – UK | (OPS2) 8/10; 4/10 |
| PlayStation: The Official Magazine | 2/5 |
| VideoGamer.com | 5/10 |

SWAT: Target Liberty received "mixed" reviews according to the review aggregation website Metacritic.
