= Police Quest: SWAT 2 =

1998 video game

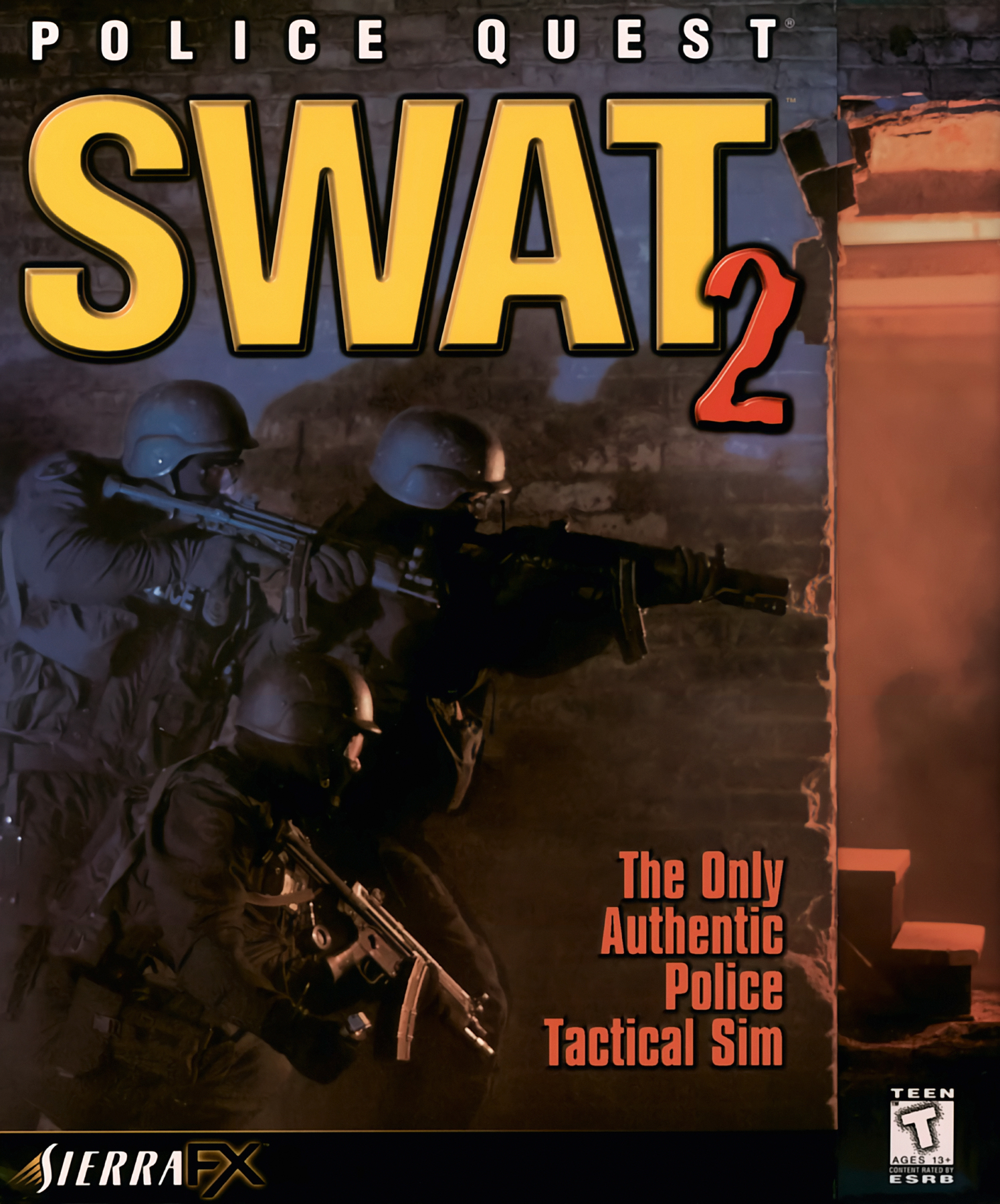
- Developer: Yosemite Entertainment
- Publisher: Sierra FX
- Producer: Oliver Brelsford Craig Alexander
- Designer: Susan Frischer
- Programmer: Victor Sadauskas
- Writer: Susan Frischer
- Composers: Jason Hayes; Chance Thomas
- Series: Police Quest
- Platform: Microsoft Windows
- Release: NA: July 11, 1998; PAL: 1998
- Genre: Real-time tactics
- Modes: Single-player, multiplayer

Police Quest: SWAT 2 (stylized as SWAT_{2}) is a 1998 real-time tactics video game developed by Yosemite Entertainment and published by Sierra FX (both studios of Sierra On-Line) exclusively for Microsoft Windows. It is the sixth installment in the Police Quest series and the second installment in the SWAT subseries. The game follows the Los Angeles Police Department (LAPD) Metropolitan Division SWAT team as they clash with a domestic terrorist militia launching attacks across Los Angeles.

SWAT 2 uses an isometric view, with the player issuing orders to individual units as they move through the level. The game has two campaigns, featuring storylines for both police and terrorists.

The game received average reviews, though they were more positive than its predecessor. A sequel, SWAT 3: Close Quarters Battle, was released in 1999.

== Gameplay ==
A SWAT sniper element near a command center

Police Quest: SWAT 2 is a real-time tactics game played from an isometric perspective. The player takes the role of a commander, ordering the units they selected in the pre-mission selection stage and completing objectives. Movements and actions are conducted by selecting units and clicking where they must move or what they must target. Units can be sorted into "elements" (color-coded teams) to make managing multiple squads easier. Each unit has skills in two categories: "marksmanship", relating to weapons (namely handguns, automatic firearms, shotguns, and sniper rifles); and "cross-training", which vary between factions but generally relate to equipment and utility proficiency. SWAT units have a third skill category, "certification", that denote whether or not they are able to specialize in a certain role (element leader, sniper, explosives, EMT, K9), each of which have unique abilities, such as snipers being able to reveal any part of the map within their line of sight. Units can carry equipment with them, such as breaching tools, gas masks, grenades, bombs, and body armor.

A Five Eyes member's biography page

The game features two separate campaigns, one following the LAPD SWAT and the other following the Five Eyes terrorist organization. Each faction has unique weapons and equipment, though they are mostly symmetrical in nature. SWAT has four support abilities (attempt negotiations, call air support to spot enemies, call SWAT vehicle to breach doors and walls, request sniper support), while Five Eyes only has two (accept negotiations, call getaway car). Both factions have unique gameplay factors in their campaigns: SWAT has units readily available, while Five Eyes must recruit more units; SWAT is briefed during a mission, while Five Eyes is briefed before; SWAT must follow rules of engagement and preferably arrest suspects, while Five Eyes can kill police and hostages with minimal consequences; and the objectives of SWAT missions are different from Five Eyes campaigns, with Five Eyes causing incidents while SWAT responds to stop them.

== Plot ==
In 1999, the LAPD, led by Chief John De Souza, deploys its SWAT team to handle a series of violent crimes across Los Angeles. Aided by SWAT commander Sergeant Griff Markossian and police negotiator Sergeant Mike Alvarez, De Souza commands SWAT as it handles increasingly complex incidents ranging from robberies and standoffs to riots and assassinations.

Over the course of their deployments, the LAPD frequently clashes with the Five Eyes, a cult-like transcendentalist left-wing terrorist militia led by the mysterious "Bashō" and his second-in-command "Dante". SWAT deploys to defeat Five Eyes and prevent them from recruiting more members, while Five Eyes manages to kill numerous officers and print their manifesto as part of their attempts to indoctrinate the public to their cause. After SWAT saves the Mayor of Los Angeles from an assassination attempt, Five Eyes launches a retaliatory assault on the Parker Center and kills Sergeant Markossian, but SWAT manages to repel the attack and protect De Souza.

Around the same time, Five Eyes ambushes a prisoner transport and rescues Bashō, who was absent for most of the Five Eyes campaign. However, this sparks an internal conflict as Bashō and Dante vie for control over Five Eyes, resulting in a three-way shootout between Bashō's faction, Dante's faction, and SWAT at Five Eyes' Topanga Canyon headquarters. Bashō attempts to flee the city at LAX, but Dante's faction assassinates him, and they escape in a plane as SWAT arrives. Dante gains full control over Five Eyes, but renounces Bashō's criminal ways as unviable, disbands Five Eyes, and retires with his faction in "the nearest tropical island that doesn't have an extradition treaty with the U.S.".

== Development ==
Many of Police Quest: SWAT 2's in-game missions were based on real life events, such as the North Hollywood shootout of February 1997, and a small-scale riot at a strip mall that can be seen as a parallel to the 1992 Los Angeles riots that followed the Rodney King beating incident.

The lead designer of the game was Susan Frischer. The game's soundtrack was composed by Jason Hayes and Chance Thomas, with the game's theme song being titled "Just Another Day in L.A.", performed by Utahn singer Randall "Randy" Porter, composed by Chance Thomas, and written by Susan Frischer.

Early releases of the game were listed as Police Quest 6 (PQ6) in the file names and folders. However, that name does not appear on the title screen or cover art.

== Release ==
Police Quest: SWAT 2 was released on July 11, 1998 in North America.

Police Quest: SWAT 2 was later re-released on GOG.com in the SWAT Career Pack (with all six Police Quest games), the Police Quest: SWAT Force pack (which included the first two SWAT games), the Police Quest: SWAT Generation collection (with SWAT and SWAT 3), and in Police Quest: SWAT 1 & 2.

== Reception ==
Reception

Aggregate score
Aggregator	Score
GameRankings	70%

Review scores
Publication	Score
AllGame	4.5/5
Computer Games Strategy Plus	2.5/5
Computer Gaming World	3.5/5
Game Informer	6/10
GameRevolution	A−
GameSpot	5.7/10
IGN	7/10
PC Gamer (UK)	68%
PC Gamer (US)	52%

Police Quest: SWAT 2 received "average" reviews, much more positive than the previous two games, according to the review aggregation website GameRankings. The game still had several flaws, such as the overly complicated interface, micromanaging, an imperfect artificial intelligence, and a simple work-around of selling the sidearms of unused avatars that allowed players to ignore the budgeting and financial aspect of the game.

=== Sales ===
Like its predecessor, Police Quest: SWAT 2 was a commercial success. Its sales surpassed 400,000 copies by late 1999.
