= Swathi =

Swathi may refer to:

== Film ==
- Swathi (1985 film)
- Swathi (1994 film), a 1994 Indian Kannada romantic drama film directed by Shivamani
- Swathi Chinukulu, a 1989 Telugu-language Indian feature film directed by Sri Chakravarthy
- Swathi Kiranam, a 1992 Telugu musical film
- Swathi Muthu, a 2003 Indian Kannada film which was directed by D. Rajendra Babu
- Swathi Muthyam, a 1985 Telugu film

== People ==
- Swathi (actress), Tamil film actress in the 1990s
- Swathi Deekshith, Indian actress in Telugu, Bengali and Tamil films
- Swathi Reddy, Telugu and Tamil film actress
- Swathi Thirunal Rama Varma (1813–1846), maharaja of the state of Travancore, India
- Swati Verma, Indian film actress
- Swathi (1992–2016), Indian murder victim, see Swathi murder case

== Other ==
- Swathi (magazine), a Telugu weekly women's magazine
- Swathi, Nepal
- Swathi Sangeetha Puraskaram, an honour for musicians
- Swathi Sangeethotsavam, a music festival celebrating the compositions of Maharaja Swathi Thirunal
- Swathi Thirunal College of Music, in Thiruvananthapuram, Kerala, India
- Swathi Weapon Locating Radar, a mobile counter-battery radar developed in India

== See also ==
- Swati (disambiguation)
