= Battle of Shantou =

Battle of Shantou may refer to:

- Battle of Shantou (1927), rout of the Nanchang Uprising mutineers by superior Right-Kuomintang forces
- Battle of Shantou (1939), capture of the port by Japanese admiral Nobutake Kondo.
