= SWAT Force =

2006 video game

- Developer: Kaolink
- Publisher: Vivendi Universal Games Mobile
- Series: Police Quest
- Platform: Mobile
- Release: February 28, 2006
- Genre: Shoot 'em up
- Mode: Single-player

SWAT Force is a 2006 shoot 'em up game developed by the French studio Kaolink and published by Vivendi. It is the first game of the Police Quest series to be released for mobiles. The player controls a two-man team (sharp shooter and demolition expert) and must rescue hostages, arrest suspects and secure weapons. It was released February 28, 2006, for mobile devices.

== Gameplay ==
The player controls a two-person SWAT team consisting of an artilleryman and an expert. The expert is able to pick locks, hack computers and defuse bombs, while the artilleryman is equipped with a more lethal weapon as well as stun grenades, flashbang grenades and the ability to get enemies to surrender.

== Reception ==
Reception

Aggregate score
Aggregator	Score
GameRankings	66%

Review scores
Publication	Score
GameSpot	7.9/10
IGN	7.8/10

The game received "average" reviews according to the review aggregation website GameRankings.
