= Swati (field hockey) =

Indian field hockey player

Personal information
- Born: 14 May 1993 (age 33) Haryana, India

Sport
- Sport: Field hockey
- Position: Goalkeeper
National team
Years	Team	Caps	Goals
–	India		-
Medal record
Women's field hockey
Representing India
Asian Champions Trophy
Silver medal – second place	2018 Donghae
Girls' Asia Cup
Bronze medal – third place	2011 Bangkok

Swati (born 14 May 1993) is an Indian field hockey player and is a member of the India women's national field hockey team. She hails from Haryana and plays as the goalkeeper.

== Career ==
In January 2018, Swati was part of the 33-member Indian Women’s Players for the national camp starting in Bengaluru’s Sports Authority of India campus on 3 January.

Swati made her debut on 5 March 2018 in Seoul, where India played Korea as part of the Korea tour and Swati's crucial save in the 23rd minute denied the hosts a penalty corner. In the fourth quarter, she made some important saves and saved two penalty corners in the last quarter. In this match, India beat Korea for a score of 1-0.

In April 2018, Swati was also part of the 61-players for the senior women national camp in Bengaluru’s Sports Authority of India campus.

In June 2018, Swati was part of the 20-member Indian women’s hockey team touring Spain as goalkeeper.
