= SFWA =

SFWA may refer to:

- Science Fiction and Fantasy Writers Association
- Scottish Football Writers' Association
