= LAPD Metropolitan Division =

Division of the Los Angeles Police Department

Los Angeles Police Department Metropolitan Division
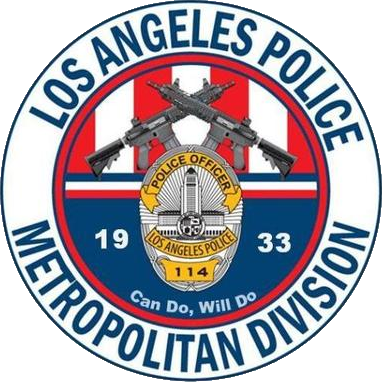
- Metropolitan Division seal
- Active: 1933–present
- Country: United States
- Agency: Los Angeles Police Department
- Part of: Special Operations Group
- Headquarters: 2710 West Temple Street, Los Angeles, California 90026
- Motto: "Can Do, Will Do"
- Common name: Metro Division
- Abbreviation: Metro

Structure
- Sworn officers: 563 (2019)
- Subunits: B Platoon: Citywide Tactical Response Team; C Platoon: Citywide Tactical Response Team; D Platoon: Special Weapons and Tactics (SWAT) Team; E Platoon: Mounted Unit; K-9 Platoon; H Platoon: Headquarters Platoon; M Platoon: Administrative Support; Underwater Dive Unit

Commanders
- Current commander: Captain II Andre Rainey

Website
- Official website

The Metropolitan Division of the Los Angeles Police Department (commonly referred to as Metro Division or just Metro) is an elite division of the City of Los Angeles Police Department (LAPD). It was formed in 1933 and is organized under the LAPD's Special Operations Group. Metropolitan Division is responsible for managing the LAPD's specialized crime suppression, K-9, mounted, and tactical units, named "platoons".

Metropolitan Division is responsible for numerous duties including supporting regular patrol units, solving major crimes, search warrant service, dignitary protection, surveillance, counterterrorism, riot control, and resolving high-risk standoffs. As of 2019, Metropolitan Division consists of 392 officers across eight platoons.

== History ==
The Metropolitan Division originated from the Reserve Unit which, on April 16, 1933, was combined with the Vagrancy Squad, Intelligence Bureau, and several details from the Chief's Office to form the division.

In 1968, the division increased from 70 officers to approximately 200 officers. In 1997, the number of officers was increased to approximately 350 sworn officers and 16 civilian officers.

On April 14, 2015, Mayor Eric Garcetti announced during the 2015 State of the City address that he would add more than 200 officers to the division in an effort to control the crime rate, which had dramatically increased the year before. This included a vehicle stop strategy being implemented by Chief Charlie Beck to address a spike in shootings in South Los Angeles. In 2016, the number of sworn officers in the division increased to 486. In 2019, the number of sworn officers was reduced to 392.

The Reserve Unit was originally based out of Room 114 at Parker Center, the LAPD's former headquarters. The designation "114" is used today to refer to the Metropolitan Division headquarters. In 2016, Metropolitan Division relocated from LAPD Central Division in Downtown to the newly-renovated former Rampart Division station that had been vacant since 2008.

== Objectives ==
Assignments include:

- counterterrorism
- providing assistance to major crimes investigators
- responding to high-risk barricaded situations
- stakeouts
- security details
- serving warrants
- uniformed crime suppression details (crowd control)

== Organization ==
Metropolitan Division consists of two field platoons (B and C) and six specialized platoons (D, E, K9, H, M, and UDU).These are supervised by a Lieutenant II. "B" and "C" Platoons are primarily responsible for crime suppression; "D" Platoon is the LAPD's SWAT; "E" Platoon is the LAPD's mounted unit; "K-9" Platoon is the LAPD's police dog unit; "H" Platoon staffs headquarters; "M" Platoon performs the administrative and support functions; and the Underwater Dive Unit (UDU) is the LAPD's diving unit. Metropolitan Division also maintains a doctor, crisis negotiators, and other specialists in weaponry, computer science, and audio-visual technology. Platoon units are assigned individual radio designations starting with "R" that can be traced to the division's origins from the Reserve Unit.

=== B and C Platoons (tactical response teams) ===
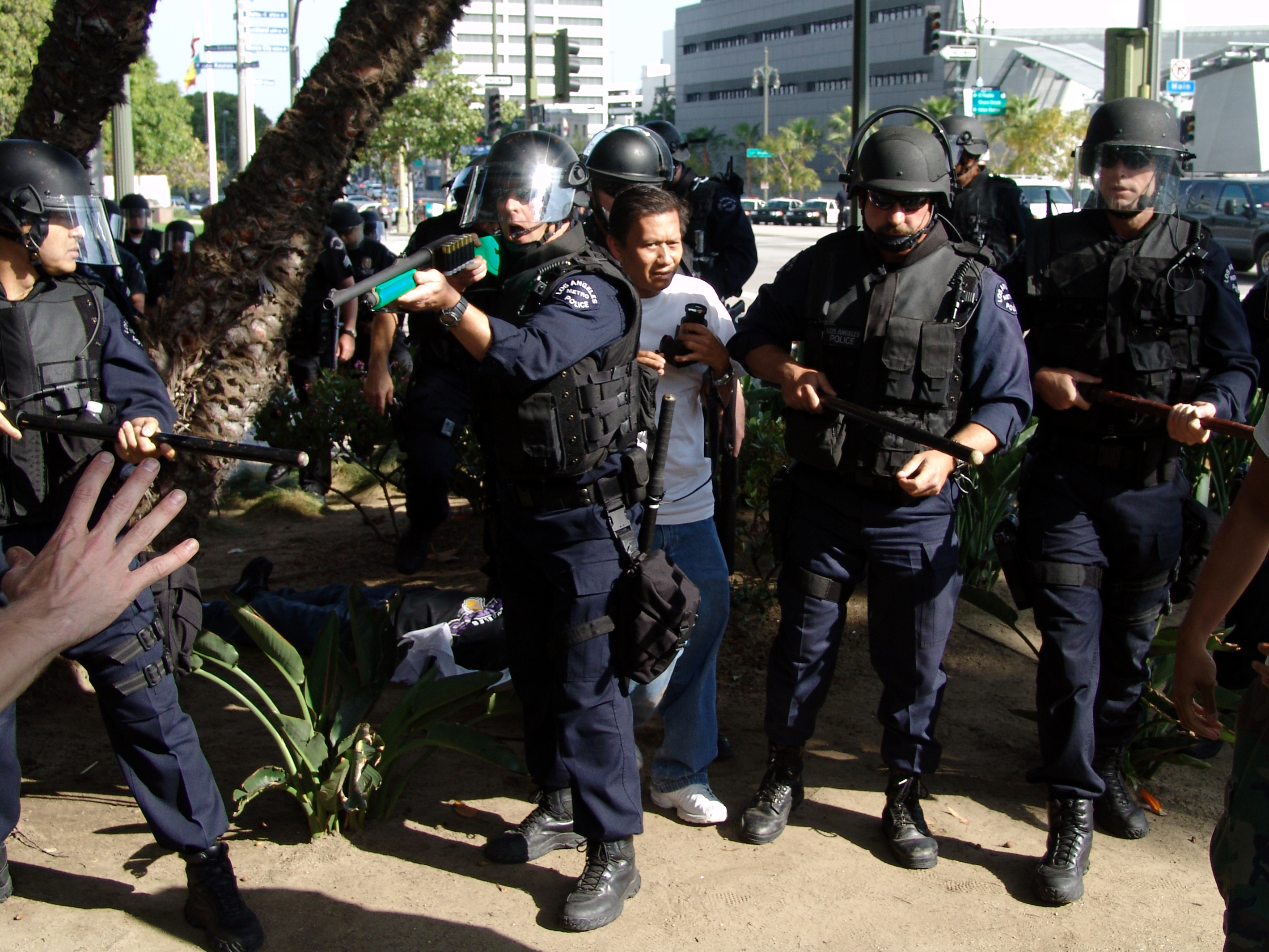
A, B, C, and G Platoon officers deployed to handle the 2006 May Day protests

B and C Platoons are primarily responsible for carrying out crime suppression missions. Their most active function is maintaining selective enforcement details in high-frequency crime areas and targeting repeat offenders and criminal predators. Particular efforts are directed at the suppression of burglary, robbery, auto theft, and burglary/theft from motor vehicles. More recently, efforts have been aimed at attacking violent repressible crime.

=== D Platoon (SWAT) ===
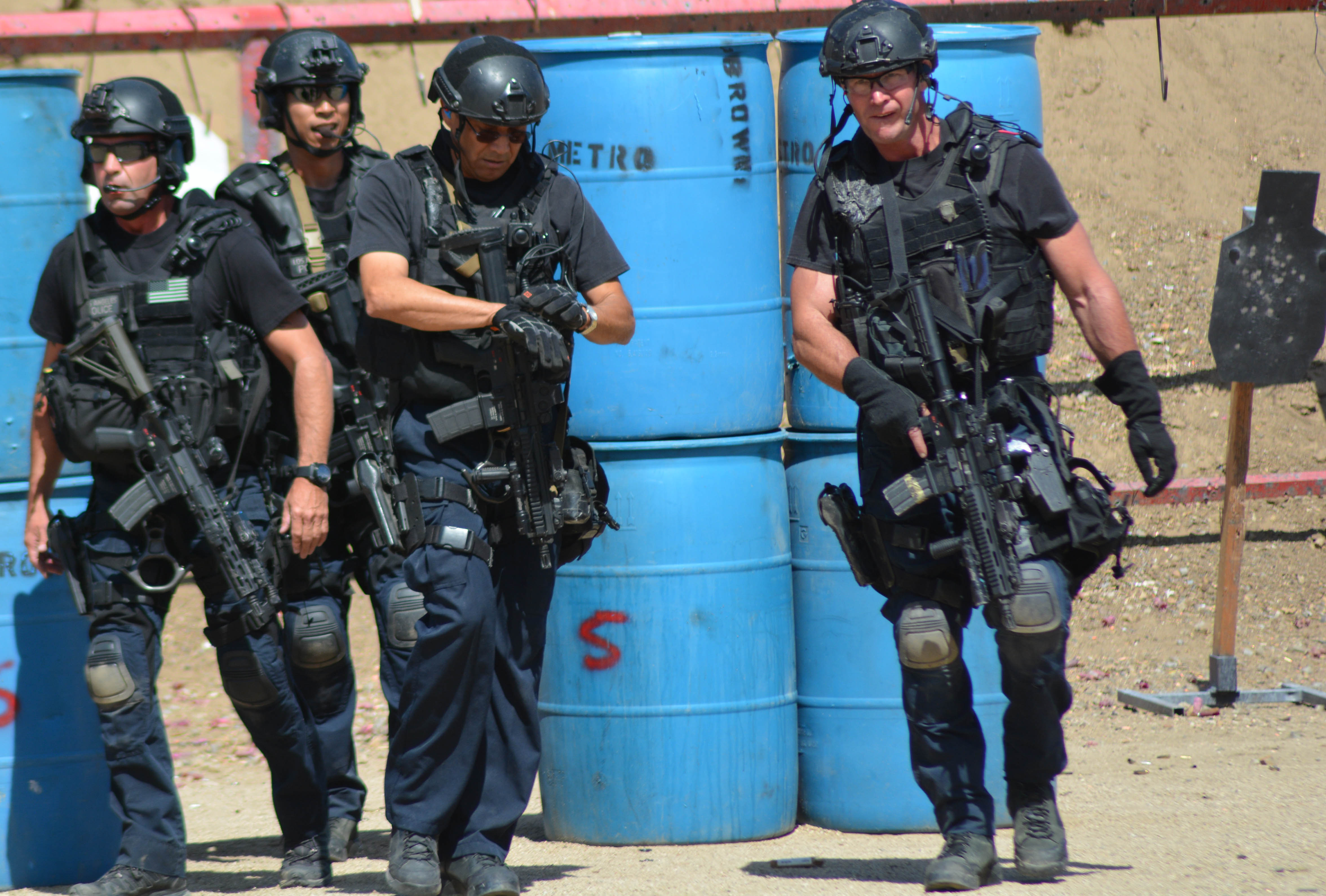
D Platoon officers during a training exercise in 2015

D Platoon is the LAPD's police tactical unit. It provides the LAPD with 24-hour coverage necessary for immediate response to barricaded suspects, snipers, crisis and hostage negotiations, potential suicide-related situations, and other high-risk incidents. SWAT currently operates the Lenco B.E.A.R., BearCat, and MedCat armored rescue vehicles. The current Officer-in-Charge is Lieutenant II Lee McMillion. The current Assistant Officer-in-Charge is Lieutenant II Carlos Figueroa.

Between 1972 and 2005, SWAT had 3,371 activations; of those, 3,196 were tactical incidents with 174 involving hostages, and 31 resulting in suspects being killed by SWAT.

=== E Platoon (mounted unit) ===
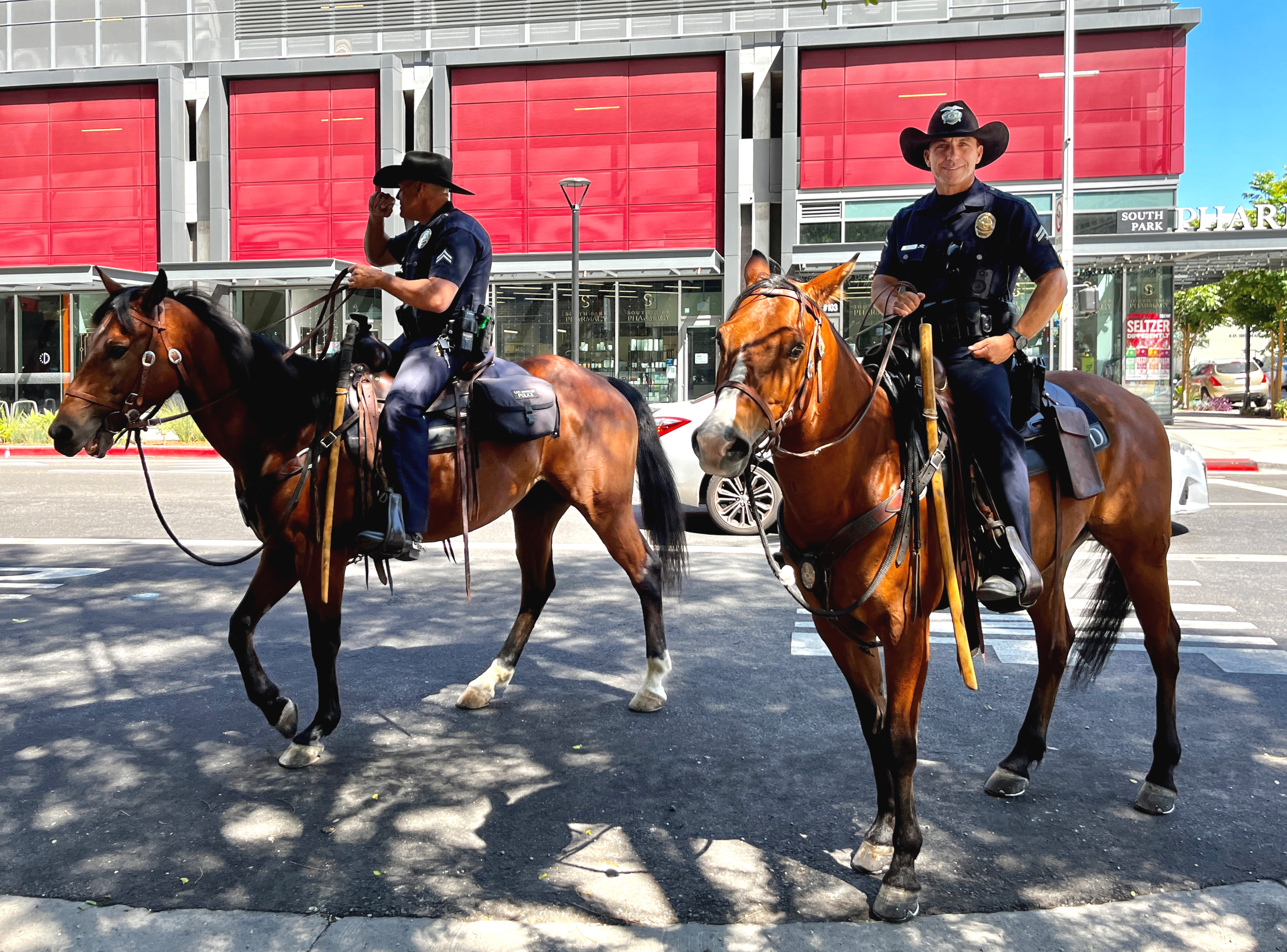
E Platoon officers on patrol in South Park

E Platoon serves as both the LAPD's mounted police unit and the reserve unit of the Special Operations Bureau.

=== K-9 Platoon ===
K-9 Platoon, or the Canine Platoon, deploys highly trained dog handlers and their police dogs. Two K-9 officers have been trained in search and rescue operations using dogs. The department first introduced dogs in April 1980, when it commenced a one-year pilot program with two dogs, which was declared a success after two months.

The K-9 Platoon is supervised by a lieutenant II officer-in-charge. One of the six sergeant IIs serves as the assistant officer-in-charge. The remaining five sergeant IIs are field supervisors of the platoon. The platoon has three police officer III+1 assistant trainers and 15 police officer III canine handlers, all of whom are assigned a dog. Four of those officers are also assigned a second dog that can detect firearms and ammunition.

The K-9 program trains dogs to "find and bark" when searching for suspects, whereas other law enforcement agencies train their dogs to "find and bite". LAPD dogs are trained to only use a "bite hold" in response to threatening or evasive actions made by a suspect. In 2021, there were 315 K-9 deployments with 305 finds. Of those 305 finds, 69 resulted in a person being bitten or injured by a dog, which is termed as a contact, and four resulted in a dog bite or injury that required a person to be hospitalized which is termed as a categorical use of force incident.

In 1990, the Liberty Award was created for police dogs who are killed or seriously injured in the line of duty. The medal, which is named after Liberty, a Metropolitan Division K-9 who was shot and killed in the line of duty, has only been awarded once in its history. Liberty's handler, John Hall, received the Medal of Valor for the same incident.

== History of LAPD SWAT ==
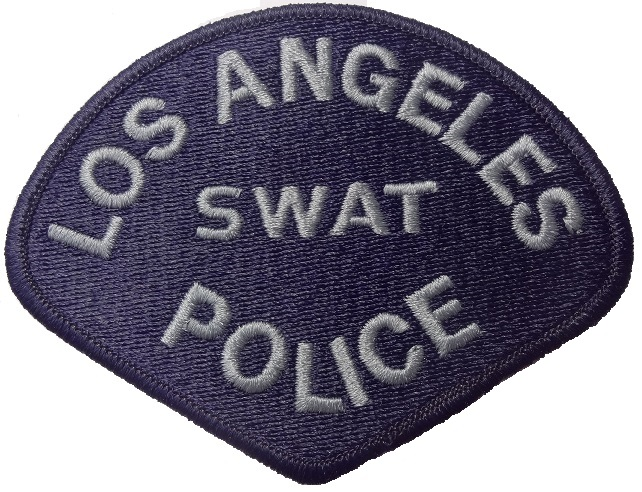
LAPD SWAT shoulder patch

While not the first to use specially trained units, the LAPD was the first to form a police tactical unit, and originally created the term "Special Weapons And Tactics". John Nelson was the LAPD officer who came up with the idea to form a specially trained and equipped unit in the LAPD, intended to respond to and manage critical situations involving shootings while minimizing police casualties. In 1967, Nelson's CO, then-Inspector Daryl F. Gates, approved this idea, and he formed a small select group of volunteer officers. This first SWAT unit initially consisted of fifteen teams of four men each, for a total staff of sixty. These officers were given special status and benefits, and were required to attend special monthly training. This unit also served as a security unit for police facilities during times of civil unrest.

In 1971, SWAT personnel were assigned on a full-time basis to Metropolitan Division to respond to continuing action by militant groups, the rising crime rate, and the continuing difficulty of mustering a team response in a timely manner. When Metropolitan Division was reorganized into platoons, SWAT was given the designation of "D" Platoon, and formally adopted the acronym "SWAT".

The first significant deployment of LAPD's SWAT unit was on December 9, 1969, in a four-hour confrontation with members of the Black Panthers. The Panthers eventually surrendered, with three Panthers and three officers being injured. By 1974, there was a general acceptance of SWAT as a police resource in Los Angeles.

=== Significant deployments ===
==== Black Panther raid ====
On December 6, 1969, two patrol officers claimed to have seen Panther members, Paul Redd, "Duck" Smith and Geronimo Pratt, in possession of illegal firearms. Search warrants for illegal weapons were filed with the L.A. County Court Office were issued and served two hours before sunrise on December 9, 1969. The LAPD planned a massive three-location raid involving more than 350 officers. It was decided that the previously untested SWAT unit, led by Daryl Gates and Sergeant Patrick McKinley, would take the lead of the raid into the Black Panther Headquarters at 41st and Central. The Black Panthers engaged the SWAT team in a four-hour gun battle, exchanging over 5,000 rounds of ammunition until the Panthers surrendered. During the shootout, Daryl Gates called the Department of Defense, requesting and receiving permission to use a grenade launcher; however, it was never actually used. The fighting resulted in the wounding of four Panthers and four officers. All six arrested Panthers were acquitted of the most serious charges brought against them, including conspiracy to murder police officers, because it was ruled that they acted in self-defense.

==== Symbionese Liberation Army shootout ====
On the afternoon of May 17, 1974, the Symbionese Liberation Army (SLA) barricaded themselves in a residence on East 54th Street at Compton Avenue. In response, more than 400 LAPD officers, Federal Bureau of Investigation (FBI) agents, Los Angeles County Sheriff's Department (LASD) deputies, California Highway Patrol (CHP) officers, and Los Angeles Fire Department (LAFD) firefighters surrounded the residence. Coverage of the siege was broadcast to millions via television and radio and featured in the world press for days after. Negotiations were opened with the barricaded suspects on numerous occasions, both prior to and after the introduction of tear gas, and police did not fire until the SLA had fired several volleys of semi-automatic and fully automatic gunfire at them. Despite the 3,772 rounds fired by the SLA, no police, civilian, or emergency services casualties were reported.

During the shootout, a fire erupted inside the residence. The cause of the fire is officially unknown; police speculated that an errant round ignited one of the suspects' Molotov cocktails, while other sources claim that police tear gas grenades started the structure fire. All six of the suspects suffered multiple gunshot wounds and died in the ensuing blaze.

By the time of the SLA shootout, SWAT teams had reorganized into six 10-man teams, each team consisting of two five-man units, called elements. An element consisted of an element leader, two assaulters, a scout, and a rear-guard. The normal gear issued them included a first aid kit, gloves, and a gas mask. It was a major change at the time to have police armed with semi-automatic rifles, at a time when officers were usually issued six-shot revolvers and shotguns. The encounter with the SLA sparked a trend towards SWAT teams being issued body armor and fully automatic weapons of various types.

==== 1997 North Hollywood shootout ====
The North Hollywood shootout was an armed confrontation between two heavily armed and armored bank robbers, Larry Eugene Phillips, Jr. and Emil Mătăsăreanu, and both SWAT and patrol officers in North Hollywood on February 28, 1997. It began when responding North Hollywood Division patrol officers engaged Phillips and Mătăsăreanu leaving a bank which the two men had just robbed. Eleven officers and seven civilians sustained injuries before LAPD SWAT arrived and both robbers were killed. Phillips and Mătăsăreanu had robbed several banks prior to their attempt in North Hollywood and were notorious for their heavy armament, which included automatic rifles. LAPD patrol officers were typically armed with low-caliber handguns or revolvers, with shotguns available in their cars (only SWAT officers were regularly equipped with rifles). Phillips and Mătăsăreanu carried fully automatic rifles, with ammunition capable of penetrating regular police body armor, and wore full body armor that police handguns could not penetrate. The officers at the scene had a significant disadvantage until LAPD SWAT arrived with equivalent firepower and body armor; they also appropriated several semi-automatic rifles from a nearby firearms dealer to help even the odds, though by the time this began to happen, SWAT had already arrived. The incident sparked debate on the appropriate firepower for patrol officers to have available in similar situations in the future. Since then, both LAPD patrol and investigative divisions now have access to "Patrol Rifles". Such rifles are most commonly the AR-15 and M4 Assault Rifle platform chambered in 5.56MM and .223 Remington calibers. Other law enforcement agencies across the country have also followed this trend to keep their regular patrol officers better equipped against a well-armed adversary.

==== First officer fatality ====
Randal David Simmons
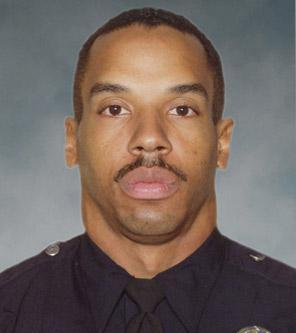
- Born: July 22, 1956; Los Angeles County, California, U.S.
- Died: February 7, 2008 (aged 51); Winnetka, California, U.S.
- Other name: Randy
- Police career
- Country: United States
- Department: Los Angeles Police Department
- Service years: 1981 – 2008
- Rank: Sworn in as an officer – 1981 – Police Officer III – Senior Lead Officer ‡
- Badge no.: 22885

Randal "Randy" David Simmons (July 22, 1956 – February 7, 2008) was the first member of the LAPD SWAT to be killed in the line of duty in its 40-year history (although an officer died in a training accident in 1998). He was shot and killed in Winnetka during a standoff with a barricaded suspect. He was among five deaths in the incident, including three civilians and the suspect. SWAT Officer James Veenstra was also seriously injured in the same incident. The suspect, who was killed by a police sniper, was identified as 20-year-old Edwin Rivera. The three civilian victims were identified as 54-year-old Gerardo Rivera, 21-year-old Edgar Rivera and 25-year-old Endi Rivera, members of Edwin's family.

Simmon's funeral, which was attended by nearly 25,000 mourners including law enforcement personnel from around the world, was the largest police funeral in American history. Simmons, who was a 27-year LAPD veteran, had been with SWAT for more than 20 years.

To honor his legacy, the Metropolitan Division Randal Simmons Explorer Post 114 was named and dedicated after his death to continue his youth outreach work. Officer Simmons was also mentioned as a source of inspiration behind character Officer Jones' reason for joining the LAPD in the television series Southland, in the episode "Underwater".

== Controversies ==
Metropolitan Division's B and C Platoons were part of 600 police officers deployed to handle the 2007 MacArthur Park rallies, a pair of May Day rallies at MacArthur Park demanding amnesty for undocumented immigrants. Riot control actions from the officers resulted in 27 protestors and nine media employees being injured, five people being arrested, and at least 50 civilians filing complaints regarding mistreatment. A $13 million settlement was paid over allegations of civil rights violations, and 17 officers and two sergeants from Metropolitan Division were disciplined for their actions.

In May 2017, a D Platoon officer shot and killed an armed suspect in Sunland-Tujunga from an LAPD Air Support Division helicopter. The helicopter was deployed after it was determined the suspect, who broke into a house and armed himself with the homeowner's gun, held a position that was too advantageous over officers on the ground. One year later, in May 2018, an LAPD internal review found 12 officers violated departmental policy for force during the incident, stating several officers "fired after the suspect no longer posed an imminent threat and that others were too far away to determine the threat".

In July 2020, a former D Platoon sergeant sued the LAPD, alleging that D Platoon's culture created a "SWAT Mafia" that glorified the use of lethal and excessive force over less-lethal force or de-escalation. In the lawsuit, the former sergeant stated the SWAT Mafia had expansive influence within Metropolitan Division; promoted officers based on nepotism and favoritism rather than merit; and sabotaged, harassed, and overlooked officers who did not share their values, promoted de-escalation, or spoke out against them. The former sergeant alleged that after he informed the LAPD Internal Affairs Division of the SWAT Mafia's existence, he was forcibly transferred out of SWAT to a K-9 assignment at Los Angeles International Airport, which he claimed was deliberately picked to inconvenience him with the lengthy travel time required from his home in San Bernardino County. In 2022, following an internal investigation ordered by Chief Michel Moore, the LAPD released a report denying D Platoon had issues related to lethal force. The report found that of SWAT's 1,350 deployments between 2012 and 2022, only 105 deployments used any force (fatal and non-fatal), and that during that ten-year period, only 20 SWAT officers were involved in on-duty shootings.

== In popular culture ==
SWAT units as a whole became well known in the 1975 television series S.W.A.T., which featured a SWAT unit loosely based on LAPD SWAT. In 2003, a film adaptation of the series starred Samuel L. Jackson, Colin Farrell and LL Cool J and was directed by Clark Johnson. In 2017, CBS created a new S.W.A.T. television series based on the 1975 series and the 2003 movie, starring former Criminal Minds star Shemar Moore; unlike its predecessor, the series establishes that the unit depicted is LAPD SWAT.

The SWAT series of computer games, created by Sierra Entertainment and developed by Vivendi Universal and Irrational Games, started off as an interactive film follow-up to the Police Quest series, which was narrated by retired LAPD Chief Daryl Gates. The SWAT series then continued as a real-time strategy game, and then three first-person tactical shooters similar to the Rainbow Six series. All mainline entries in the series featured the LAPD SWAT except SWAT 4.

In the first person tactical shooter video game Ready or Not developed by VOID Interactive, D Platoon of LSPD (a fictional counterpart of Los Angeles police department) is featured as the main playable faction.

In The Rookie, both SWAT and tactical response teams (only referred to as Metro) are prominently featured within the series. K-9 and mounted units also make appearances.

== See also ==
- NYPD Emergency Service Unit
