= SWAT Elite Troops =

2007 video game

- Developer: Rovio Mobile
- Publisher: Vivendi Games Mobile
- Composer: expansion
- Series: Police Quest
- Platform: Mobile
- Release: EU: December 6, 2007; NA: March 2008
- Genre: Shoot 'em ups
- Mode: Single-player

SWAT Elite Troops is the second game of the Police Quest series to be released for mobile devices. It was released in December 2007.
