= SWAT 4 =

2005 video game

- Developer: Irrational Games
- Publisher: Sierra Entertainment
- Producer: Sara Verrilli
- Designers: Bill Gardner; Paul Hellquist; Ian Vogel
- Writer: Sara Verrilli
- Composer: Eric Brosius
- Series: Police Quest
- Engine: Unreal Engine 2
- Platform: Microsoft Windows
- Release: NA: April 5, 2005; EU: April 8, 2005; The Stetchkov Syndicate: NA: February 28, 2006; EU: March 10, 2006
- Genre: Tactical shooter
- Modes: Single-player, multiplayer

SWAT 4 is a 2005 tactical first-person shooter video game developed by Irrational Games and published by Sierra Entertainment (Vivendi Universal Games) exclusively for Microsoft Windows. It is the ninth installment in the Police Quest series and the fourth installment in the SWAT subseries. In SWAT 4, the player commands a police SWAT team in the New York City metropolitan area. Unlike its predecessor, SWAT 3: Close Quarters Battle, SWAT 4 does not have an overarching plot. Instead, gameplay takes place over a series of mostly unconnected deployments of the player's SWAT team, as they are sent to apprehend criminals, terrorists, gangs, and cults in and around New York City.

SWAT 4 was built on Irrational Games' Vengeance Engine powered by Unreal Engine 2 technology. Like the rest of the SWAT series, SWAT 4 places heavy emphasis on following proper police procedure, minimizing casualties, and ensuring the safe apprehension of enemies as opposed to simply killing them.

The game was well received by critics and players. An expansion pack, SWAT 4: The Stetchkov Syndicate, was released in 2006.

== Gameplay ==
In SWAT 4, players control a police tactical unit as they are deployed to handle situations such as arrest warrants, hostage-takings, bomb threats, and shootouts. SWAT 4 is a tactical shooter, where characters can be killed easily and in few hits. Therefore, tactics and planning are emphasized over mere brute force. Enemies, called "suspects", range from individuals and small groups to trained and organized terrorists.

A significant aspect of SWAT 4's gameplay is the rules of engagement (RoE), which dictates the player's acceptable actions and use of force. SWAT 4 emphasizes the idea that "SWAT is a life-saving organization", and thus prohibits both the use of lethal force unless done justifiably and in self-defense, and the reckless or excessive use of force. Violating the RoE results in penalties for unauthorized use of force, which may influence the outcome of the mission; examples of such violations include killing or incapacitating a hostage or officer, killing an unarmed or fleeing suspect, not marking evidence (such as dropped weapons or objective items), and not handcuffing hostages and suspects.

Per its RoE-focused gameplay, the game highlights using less-lethal weaponry such as tasers, pepper-ball guns, baton rounds, and riot guns to arrest suspects. Lethal weaponry such as handguns, rifles, submachine guns, and shotguns are available, but are only intended to be used against suspects that necessitate the use of lethal force (such as those who attempt to harm officers or hostages and do not surrender). Weaponry aside, equipment such as stun grenades, stinger grenades, fiberscopes, door wedges, multi-tools, and breaching devices are key tools intended for frequent use. Players can also equip their officers with bulletproof vests and combat helmets that offer varying degrees of protection.

Like in previous SWAT entries, the SWAT team is divided into two "elements", red and blue, with the entire entry team being referred to as gold, while the team leader (the player) is designated white. The player is able to command each element and individual team member to perform actions including "stacking up" at an entryway, using equipment, holding position, or even moving on their own to perform actions elsewhere. Team members will often, but not always, only listen to the player before acting; for instance, officers will only arrest a surrendering suspect if ordered to, but they will independently shoot armed and resisting suspects.

=== Multiplayer ===
A SWAT team clearing a subway maintenance tunnel during a multiplayer co-op match in SWAT 4

SWAT 4 features several multiplayer game modes, all of which are team-based, pitting SWAT against Suspects. The multiplayer modes are:

- Barricaded Suspects: A team deathmatch mode, where teams gain points by arresting or killing members of the opposing team. The team that reaches the score limit or has the most points by the end of the match wins.
- VIP Escort: A random SWAT player is designated the VIP. SWAT must escort the VIP to an extraction point, while the Suspects must arrest the VIP, hold them for two minutes, then execute them. If the Suspects kill the VIP too early, they automatically lose.
- Rapid Deployment: Three to five time bombs are placed throughout the map. SWAT must locate and defuse the bombs, while the Suspects must protect the bombs and prevent their defusal so they can detonate.
- Smash & Grab: The Suspects must collect a briefcase and bring it to an extraction point, while SWAT must stop them. The match is timed: if a Suspect is arrested, 30 seconds are deducted, and if the Suspects cannot extract the briefcase in time, they lose. Added in The Stetchkov Syndicate.
- Co-op: The singleplayer campaign but with the AI-controlled SWAT team members replaced by up to four other players. In The Stetchkov Syndicate, Co-op is upgraded to allow up to 10 players, with a new feature to divide players into red and blue elements with respective leaders, and the new ability to run Co-op servers for custom missions.

== The Stetchkov Syndicate ==
SWAT 4: The Stetchkov Syndicate is an expansion pack for SWAT 4 released on February 28, 2006, in North America and on March 10, 2006, in Europe. It follows the SWAT Team's operations to defeat the Stetchkov crime family.

Various improvements to the game are added in The Stetchkov Syndicate, such as the addition of VoIP to multiplayer games, seven new singleplayer missions, two new multiplayer modes, seven new weapons (including the ability to punch non-compliant individuals), 10 player co-op with up to two teams of five, stat tracking, and ladders and rankings for multiplayer were added. New game mechanics were also added, including the ability to hold commands until the leader gives the signal in singleplayer, the ability to divide players into red and blue elements in multiplayer, and the chance for surrendering suspects to pick up their weapons if they are not arrested in time.

== Reception ==
Reception

Aggregate score
Aggregator	Score
Metacritic	85/100

Review scores
Publication	Score
Computer Games Magazine	4.5/5
Computer Gaming World	5/5
Edge	7/10
Eurogamer	8/10
Game Informer	8.25/10
GamePro	4/5
GameSpot	8.5/10
GameSpy	4.5/5
GameZone	8.8/10
IGN	9/10
PALGN	7.5/10
PC Format	88%
PC Gamer (US)	79%
PC Zone	86%
The Sydney Morning Herald	3.5/5

SWAT 4 received "generally favorable reviews" according to the review aggregation website Metacritic. On a computer game sales chart compiled by NPD Techworld, it claimed tenth place for the week ending April 17. It finished 11th for the month of April overall, at an average retail price of $48.

GameSpot's Bob Colayco stated that "as a realistic police simulator, SWAT 4 definitely hits the mark. Though the frame rate gets chunky at times, and there are a couple of irritating bugs and quirks, the AI delivers on most counts in a game that is designed with great replayability." The website later criticized a feature of the first patch for SWAT 4, where updated environments featured advertisements for real-world television series, and after the game was closed data regarding how the player treated the product placement was sent to the developers.

IGN's Dan Adams said that "Irrational's new addition to the venerable SWAT franchise does a brilliant job of picking up on all of the things that make SWAT work so exciting from the outside perspective". Adams was also critical of the friendly AI, stating that "sometimes the team will bust into a room on command and take down everybody with enough efficiency to be impressive while other times they'll run straight past an enemy looking to cover a certain area of the room only to get shot in the back of the head".

SWAT 4 was a runner-up for Computer Games Magazine's list of the top 10 computer games of 2005.

=== The Stetchkov Syndicate ===
Reception

Aggregate score
Aggregator	Score
Metacritic	80/100

Review scores
Publication	Score
Computer Games Magazine	3/5
Computer Gaming World	4.5/5
Eurogamer	8/10
GameSpot	8.2/10
IGN	8.5/10
PALGN	7/10
PC Format	80%
PC Gamer (US)	70%
PC Zone	77%

The Stetchkov Syndicate received "favorable" reviews, though they were slightly lower ratings than the original SWAT 4, according to Metacritic.

== See also ==
- Ready or Not, a 2023 tactical shooter considered to be a spiritual successor to SWAT 4
