= SWAT (magazine) =

- Editor: Denny Hansen
- Frequency: Monthly
- Publisher: LFP, Inc
- Founded: 1981
- Country: United States
- Based in: Boynton Beach, Florida
- Website: www.swatmag.com
- OCLC: 25541930

SWAT (Survival Weapons And Tactics) is a monthly magazine dedicated to firearms, law enforcement, and other tactical-related activities in the United States, with a special focus on SWAT.

The magazine primarily offers reviews on guns, ammunition, tactics, training, shooting gear; as well as self-defense and alerts on firearm rights. In addition to those departments, each issue contains featured articles and personality profiles of people in the tactical industry as well as press releases of new products.

SWAT staff writers include Massad Ayoob, Scott Reitz, Lewis Awerbuck, Leroy Thompson, Chuck Taylor, Claire Wolfe and Denny Hansen.
