= Police Quest =

Police Quest / SWAT
- Genres: Adventure, simulation, strategy, tactical shooter
- Developers: Sierra On-Line; Irrational Games (SWAT 4)
- Publisher: Sierra On-Line
- Platforms: Amiga, Apple II, Apple IIGS, Atari ST, Mac (System 7), Windows, MS-DOS, PlayStation 2, Xbox, PlayStation Portable, Mobile
- First release: Police Quest: In Pursuit of the Death Angel; November 1987
- Latest release: SWAT Elite Troops; March 1, 2008

Police Quest (or SWAT) is a series of police simulation video games produced and published by Sierra On-Line between 1987 and 1998. The first four were adventure simulation games, the first three of which were designed by former police officer Jim Walls. The fourth to sixth titles were designed by former LAPD Chief Daryl F. Gates. Both SWAT and the real-time tactics game SWAT 2 still carried the Police Quest name and were numbered V and VI in the series, respectively, although subsequent titles in the series would drop the Police Quest title altogether and were rebranded as SWAT.

== Games ==
Release timeline
1987	Police Quest
1988	Police Quest II
1989
1990
1991	Police Quest III
1992
1993	Police Quest: Open Season
1994
1995	Police Quest: SWAT
1996
1997
1998	Police Quest: SWAT 2
1999	SWAT 3: Close Quarters Battle
2000
2001
2002
2003	SWAT: Global Strike Team
2004
2005	SWAT 4
2006	SWAT Force
2007	SWAT: Target Liberty
2008	SWAT Elite Troops

=== By Jim Walls (PQ 1–3) ===
We always wanted to put more into the games and I was never fully satisfied with the driving interfaces. However, the payoff came with the fan mail. When the letters came in, with some of the kids saying they wanted to grow up to be cops, we knew we were on the right track.

— Jim Walls, as told to USGamer

The first three games were produced by former police officer Jim Walls and follow the adventures of Sonny Bonds, a character whose name and appearance was loosely based on his own son, Sonny Walls. Jim Walls makes a cameo appearance in each game, typically in the introduction.

Police Quest: In Pursuit of the Death Angel

Released in 1987 using Sierra's Adventure Game Interpreter parser engine, Police Quest casts the player as Sonny Bonds, a 15-year veteran police officer in the fictional town of Lytton, California. Assigned to traffic duty, Sonny investigates what appears to be a simple car crash but turns out to be a homicide. Relieved by his supervisor, Sergeant Dooley, Sonny goes on a short coffee break with a fellow officer and returns to duty. He gives a traffic violation citation to a driver, single-handedly faces a tough gang of drunken bikers, and makes a DUI arrest. As the game progresses, he advances from patrol officer to temporary narcotics detective to undercover agent in hope of tracking down a murderous drug dealer named Jessie Bains, "The Death Angel". In order to find Jessie Bains, Sonny enlists the help of his former high school sweetheart, "Sweet Cheeks" Marie, who is now working as a prostitute.

The game is the most realistic of those developed by Sierra in the late 1980s when compared to Leisure Suit Larry, King's Quest, or Space Quest, and featured many puzzles where proper police procedure is required to succeed. It was released for MS-DOS, Apple II, Mac, Amiga, Atari ST and Apple IIGS. A SCI1.1 enhanced remake in 256 color VGA was released in 1992, which was also the first game released in the series not to feature dead ends.

Police Quest II: The Vengeance

Released in 1988 and running on the then-current SCI0 engine, the game once again casts the player as officer Sonny Bonds. After arresting Jessie Bains, Bonds is permanently promoted to the homicide division. He begins dating Marie Wilkans, who helped him in his undercover work in exchange for the dismissal of prostitution charges against her as "Sweet Cheeks" Marie. A dark shadow is cast over Sonny's happy life, however, when Bains escapes from prison and seeks revenge. With the help of his partner Keith, Bonds must protect his girlfriend's life as well as his own while pursuing "The Death Angel" once again. Despite Sonny's efforts, Bains kills several people who were involved in his arrest and abducts Marie. Sonny pursues Bains to Steelton, the current home of Donald Colby, a reformed drug pusher from the original Police Quest.

Police Quest II is notably more "mature" than the first title in the series and relies much more on proper procedure. Failure to properly maintain Sonny's firearm at various points throughout the game will cause it to malfunction or misfire, and proceeding into a dangerous situation without proper backup will usually prove fatal.

Police Quest III: The Kindred

Sonny and Marie are married following Bains' death. Promoted once more, Sonny now has to deal with rampant crime as a drug cartel begins operating in Lytton and evidence of a satanic cult starts to appear. However, when Marie is stabbed in a mall parking lot, Sonny's police work becomes personal.

Sonny must deal with a partner with questionable ethics as well as find patterns in crime to find his next lead. The Bains family also plays a role in this game.

Released in 1991 for SCI version 1, PQ3 is completely mouse-driven. It was only released for the IBM PC and the Amiga. Before the completion of this game, Jim Walls had left Sierra for reasons that have still not been publicly explained, leaving Jane Jensen to finish the final in-game dialogue and messages. SWAT founder Daryl F. Gates was named to take over the Police Quest series while Walls, along with several former Sierra employees, would go on to design Blue Force, an adventure game similar to the Police Quest series.

=== By Daryl F. Gates (PQ 4–6) ===
The later games in the series were designed by Tammy Dargan and produced by former L.A. Chief Daryl Gates, in a different style in both atmosphere, and later even in genre. Like the original series by Jim Walls, Daryl Gates makes cameo appearances in each game. Police Quest IV and V were later spun off into the SWAT series. Unlike the earlier games in the series, these were listed as Daryl F Gates' Police Quest, rather than being a numbered series (the numbered titles were still used in packaging and printed material included with the compilation CDs).

Police Quest: Open Season

Daryl F. Gates' first game for Sierra departed completely from the style of the previous games. The player was no longer cast as Sonny Bonds, but as John Carey; the action was no longer in fictional Lytton, but in Los Angeles, California. Carey, an LAPD homicide detective whose best friend was killed in the line of duty, must track down a serial murderer in L.A.

Numerous mature themes are depicted in the game, including hate crimes, Neo-Nazism, and youth involved in crime. Graphic imagery within the game also includes the body of a child murdered by gang violence and a severed head in a refrigerator.

Using SCI2 the game replaced from earlier games with scanned photos as backgrounds, and live actors filmed from green screen as character sprites. It was released in 1993, for both IBM PC and Macintosh. The game is generally incompatible with Windows 95, and later editions; the game may crash at certain points in the game, e.g. the shooting gallery and the shoot out. This, however, was fixed with the release of the CD version with Windows installer.

This game is the most "mature" of the Police Quest series of games; while previously only a peripheral element, the themes of drug abuse, police corruption and gang violence play prominent roles in this game. Police procedure is less of an element in the game, pushed aside for the sake of storytelling.

Police Quest: SWAT

Although the game is not referred to as PQV in the title screen, it is referred to as such in several other locations in the game including the files, and the game credits, and certain versions of the packaging near the ISBN/barcode and documentation. Police Quest 5: SWAT was re-released as part of the second Police Quest Collection, and later as part of the Police Quest: SWAT Force, SWAT Career Pack (which included all six PQ games), and Police Quest: SWAT Generation compilations.

Police Quest: SWAT 2

Police Quest: SWAT 2 is the sixth and final game of the original Police Quest series. It is a real-time strategy game using an original game engine. It retained only a few adventure game elements in the form of an inventory and use of a few puzzle items such as a pizza (to draw a suspect out of a house), and similar interface (look/search icon, pickup/hand icon, communication/talk/challenge icon, etc.). It is referred to as PQ6 in a few locations including its files. Sonny Bonds is one of the agents the player may employ in the game. It was included as part of the Police Quest: SWAT Force and Police Quest: SWAT Generation compilations.

=== PC-based SWAT shooters (SWAT 3-4) ===
Although the Police Quest series continued after Open Season for two more games, these releases spawned the SWAT series and the series moved into different video game genres.

- SWAT 3: Close Quarters Battle (2000) PC/Windows—tactical shooter
- SWAT: Urban Justice (2002—cancelled) PC/Windows
- SWAT 4 (2005) PC/Windows—tactical shooter

SWAT 3: Close Quarters Battle and SWAT 4 are both tactical shooters, the only games of that type in the series. SWAT 4 is the final game in the full eight-game series, though by this point it had nothing to do with the original games, with the exception of a cameo by Marie Bonds in SWAT 3: Close Quarters Battle and Sonny Bonds as a SWAT unit lieutenant in SWAT 4.

At this point neither Jim Walls or Daryl Gates were developers in the series, though Gates was a consultant on SWAT 3: Close Quarters Battle along with the Advisor Kenneth A. Thatcher of LAPD.

The first SWAT game—technically Police Quest 5: SWAT—was later re-released as part of the Police Quest Collection Series (the second Police Quest adventure compilation), and all six PQ games were released as part of the SWAT Career Pack, the third "complete series" Police Quest collection. The first two were released in a double pack called Police Quest: SWAT Force and more recently in the Police Quest: SWAT 1+2 pack on GoG.com. In the past, the first three SWAT games were released in a compilation entitled Police Quest: SWAT Generation. SWAT 3 is currently sold separately on GoG.com, separately from the Police Quest packs.

SWAT: Urban Justice was a cancelled PC title (2001/2002) originally meant to be the followup to SWAT 3. An easter egg for the cancelled game can be found in SWAT4.

=== Console and mobile SWAT titles ===
Other SWAT titles include:

- SWAT: Global Strike Team (PS2 and Xbox) (2003)
- SWAT Force (Mobile) (2006)
- SWAT: Target Liberty (PSP) (2007)
- SWAT Elite Troops (Mobile) (2008)

== Attempts to continue the series ==
On July 16, 2013, Jim Walls announced Precinct, a Kickstarter proposal for a spiritual successor to the Police Quest franchise. Sierra veteran Robert Lindsley has been signed on as the game's executive producer. The game was to be developed by newly established studio Jim Walls Reloaded, where Lindsley also served as the company's president. The game aspired to follow the classic Sierra adventure game formula with a "modern feel". It had a funding goal of $500,000, with a fundraising period stretching from July 16 to August 16. However, Walls cancelled the Kickstarter prematurely on August 6, with $85,756 raised and 1,870 backers.

Subsequently, Walls and Lindsley announced that they would instead launch an alternative fundraising campaign for Precinct, which they called "new and unique". The new crowdfunding campaign would not have the same time restrictions as Kickstarter, and the game would be launched once the funding from its backers was secured. But this campaign was also unsuccessful, shutting down two weeks later. As Lindsley explained: "We simply don't have the momentum needed to meet the requirements of this project". Nevertheless, Walls and Lindsley still remain hopeful to realize Precinct sometime in the future.

In August 2014, Activision reactivated the Sierra Entertainment label, opening up a future for the franchise as Sierra holds the IP for any future installments of the series.

== Collections and re-releases ==
The first re-release of the games in a collection was made in 1995 as Daryl F. Gates' Police Quest Collection: The Four Most Wanted. The package was released under the Daryl F. Gates' Police Quest series title, to cash in on the then newly released Daryl F. Gates' Police Quest: SWAT. Extras included behind the scenes history with the game creators, an abridged copy of the L.A. department police manual, and a video interview with Daryl F. Gates.

The second re-release collection was made in 1997 as Police Quest Collection Series. It contained Police Quest 1–3, Open Season, and SWAT. It also included the Daryl Gates interview and the documentation from the previous collection.

The two Police Quest: SWAT games were re-released in 1999 in a collection called Police Quest: SWAT Force.

The third re-release collection was made in 2000, as the "SWAT Career Pack" which included all six Police Quest games: 1–3, Open Season, SWAT, and SWAT 2. It also included a demo for SWAT 3: Close Quarters Battle.

In 2003, the first three SWAT games were released in the Police Quest: SWAT Generation compilation.

In September 2006, Vivendi Games released Police Quest Collection: Step Behind the Badge, including the first four Police Quest games, minus the original AGI version of PQ1. The package included the DOSBox emulator for compatibility with Windows XP.

Since January 18, 2011, the Police Quest 1–4 and Police Quest: SWAT 1 & 2 packs are internationally available at GOG.com in the form of digital downloads. The 2.0 installer for the Police Quest 1–4 pack added in the original EGA version of PQ1. In 2017, SWAT 3 and SWAT 4 were both added to GOG. A community-driven online backend is available for SWAT 4's multiplayer after the shut down of Gamespy.
