= Omari Salisbury =

American journalist

Omari Salisbury, Sr.
- Born: June 4, 1975 (age 51); Seattle, Washington, United States
- Other name: Big O
- Education: Elizabeth City State University
- Occupation: Journalist
- Years active: 2000 - present
- Employer(s): Converge Media, LLC
- Organization: Africatown Community Land Trust
- Children: 3

Omari Salisbury (born June 4, 1975) is an American journalist, videographer, and businessman from Seattle, Washington. He founded Converge Media, a local independent production company focused on local news and entertainment, in 2017. Salisbury was reporting live for Converge to cover Seattle's protest response to the murder of George Floyd when he captured the "pink umbrella video," that was described as an early flashpoint of the 2020 protests in Seattle.

== Early life and education ==
Salisbury was raised in Seattle's Central District and graduated from Garfield High School (Seattle). In high school, he wrote for the school paper, the Messenger; later when he attended Elizabeth City State University he was a broadcaster on the college radio station WRVS 89.9.

During Salisbury's time at Garfield, the U.S. Department of Justice introduced Weed and Seed program. He witnessed families in his neighborhood lose their homes due to illegal drugs possession, which he viewed as unjust. This experience had an impact on his sense of duty to his community and his desire to see the Central District thrive as a home for Seattle's Black residents. Thus, civilly engaged at 16 years old, Salisbury spoke to The Seattle Times in 1992 about his concerns over the impact of the program on the high school students and the city at large. Then in 2019 he spoke with student reporters from the Messenger about the lasting legacy of the program and contemporary issues of gentrification, saying:

“The biggest threat for Garfield with gentrification is losing our magic forever. If people value what makes Garfield special, that is what makes you want to get involved... Do something. Do something and believe in it... Garfield is more than just a high school that you know. It’s a legacy. It’s a place that’s so magical.”

— Omari Salisbury, reported by Izzy Lamola and Milena Haile, Garfield Messenger

=== 1990 Arrest ===
On August 5, 1990, Omari Salisbury's brother, Tunde Salisbury, was returning home with some friends when they were stopped by officers of the Seattle Police Department. Some of the boys told the officers they were tired of being harassed by police; Omari Salisbury joined them in front of the family home and also complained about harassment. Tunde and Omari Salisbury were both arrested and witnesses said they were both beaten. They were taken to the East Precinct, although protocol indicated that minors should be taken to a juvenile facility; they allegedly faced further beaten on-site. This event caused Salisbury's mother to increase her time spent in activism, leading her to found Mothers for Police Accountability.

== Personal life ==
Salisbury lives and works in Seattle's Central District and is the father of three children. His son, Omari "Omi" Salisbury, has traveled with his father for work, interned for Converge Media, and as of 2021 had been attending Loyola University of Chicago to study journalism. Omari Salisbury is the brother of Chukundi Salisbury, a 2020 candidate for Washington State House 37th District (see 2020 Washington House of Representatives election).

Salisbury's mother is Harriet G. Walden, an activist and reverend who founded the non-profit Mothers for Police Accountability in 1990 after two of her sons (one of whom was Omari Salisbury, and both minors at the time) were arrested and beaten by officers of the Seattle Police Department. She has also served on the Seattle Community Police Commission since its inception in 2013.

== Career ==
Salisbury spent an early phase of his career reporting from Africa and the Middle East. He helped launch both TV and radio stations across Tanzania, Rwanda, and Kenya. He worked for Clouds TV International, the first and only urban African entertainment TV Station in the United Arab Emirates, as the marketing director, COO of Status Communications & Status Bookings, and CEO of Status Communications. While in this position, Salisbury orchestrated a partnership with FremantleMedia International to bring Got Talent to Kenya. Salisbury also worked to help bring musical talent to the annual 20-city Serengeti Fiesta concert series in Dar es Salaam, Tanzania, from 2000 to 2016.

After returning to Seattle full time, Salisbury founded Converge Media in 2017.

In January, 2019, Salisbury helped launch Africatown Media Network, a media engine with the original purpose to connect viewers to recordings of the Africatown Land Trust meetings, which was later expanded to media platforms like the Africatown Media Blog and Converge's Morning Update Show, to present Black community members with information and points of view given directly by leaders of community organizations, city staff members, and elected officials in the Greater Seattle area.

Following Washington Governor Jay Inslee's March 2020 stay-at-home order, The Morning Update Show pivoted their mission to center on providing Seattle and King County residents with transparent, up-to-date information on how to get through the sudden outbreak in the county without what they saw as the sensationalism of larger contributors to the 24-hour news cycle. The goal of the show at this time was to help Converge's target demographic of "Black and urban audiences" in the Seattle metropolitan area through the upheaval of the outbreak. They approached this by live-streaming readings of children's books with Seattle School Board Director Brandon Hersey, updates on the school board's plans for remote education, and financial literacy workshops.

=== Coverage of the George Floyd Protests ===
On May 30, 2020, Salisbury and his son were covering the first day of protests in Seattle in reaction to the murder of George Floyd; in the ensuing chaos of that day, both father and son found themselves on the receiving end of pepper spray and CS gas, commonly known as tear gas. This was the start of Salisbury's company, Converge Media, covering the protests through thorough summaries on their morning show The Morning Update Show streamed on Facebook, Twitter, and YouTube as well as hours of livestreams of nightly protest events, rallies, and the day-to-day events of what became the Capitol Hill Occupied Protest (CHOP). During the period in which the police had abandoned the area around the East Precinct, Converge Media continued reporting from within the bounds of the zone. Using donations from a growing viewer base, Converge upgraded their production equipment, purchased safety gear, and worked out of a donated condo that was adjacent to the East Precinct.

In the early morning hours of June 29, a shooting occurred within the protest zone (see Capitol Hill Organized Protest - June 29), and Salisbury was a witness from a considerable distance away. Salisbury was present during the July 4 protest on I-5 during which a car drove into the crowd, killing 23-year-old Summer Taylor and seriously injuring 32-year-old Diaz Love. He had not been live-streaming the July 4 protest. He also attempted to help the community in the CHOP during the period when people were residing in Cal Anderson Park overnight. He had become a recognizable face in the area and people went to him for help with problems he was not trained to help with, such as locating and aiding a victim of rape.

During discussions between the City of Seattle and protest leaders from the CHOP, Salisbury was often present during the meetings to report on behalf of Converge Media. For a closed door meeting with Mayor Jenny Durkan on June 26, 2020, he was the only journalist allowed inside and he briefed other local news outlets outside the building afterward.

When asked about where he stands on the issues being protested, Salisbury stated:

To be honest with you, there's so many people on both sides. ... And I tell people all the time, I don't have a dog in this fight in a professional capacity. In a personal capacity, man, I want to see, you know, my city. I love Seattle, the Emerald City. I mean, I want to see things get better for people. You know, I'm saying, I want there to be a better situation here. But professionally, all I can do is show up every day with my camera, try to ask as many different people from as many different perspective's questions, and try to give myself, for one, and the viewing audience an understanding of what's going on.

— Omari Salisbury, reported by Jennifer Wing, KNKX

Salisbury also covered the Seattle City Council's revised 2020 budget, which was finally passed in early August 2020, to see what (if anything) they did to meet the demands of the city's protesters. On August 11, 2020, Salisbury spoke with KIRO Radio on the circumstances of the resignation of Seattle Police Chief Carmen Best. He expressed frustrations that the council had not spoken with Best, a Black woman, about their plans to potentially reduce her pay in the 2020 budget to meet protester demands of defunding the police budget as well as balance a deficit left in the wake of the COVID-19 pandemic. His suggestion on the radio show was that the council speak to more every day Black citizens, including to parents and children of Seattle Public Schools about the community's problems and needs.

In the Autumn of 2020, Salisbury was interviewed by multiple news sources to reflect on his experience covering the protests and the CHOP during that Summer. Due to most of Salisbury's live-streaming being done from his recognizable red iPhone, the Museum of History & Industry (MOHAI) expressed interest in placing the phone in an exhibit. KOMO news reported that museum officials said "MOHAI considers Omari’s phone to be an important object and would like to see it preserved and shared with the public. We would be thrilled if it were donated to MOHAI or BHS (Black Heritage Society of Washington State)."

=== Awards ===
- Black College Broadcaster of the Year for WRVS 89.9
- Museum of History & Industry History Maker Honoree 2020
