= George Floyd protests in Seattle =

2020 civil riots in Seattle after the murder of George Floyd

- Part of George Floyd protests in Washington state
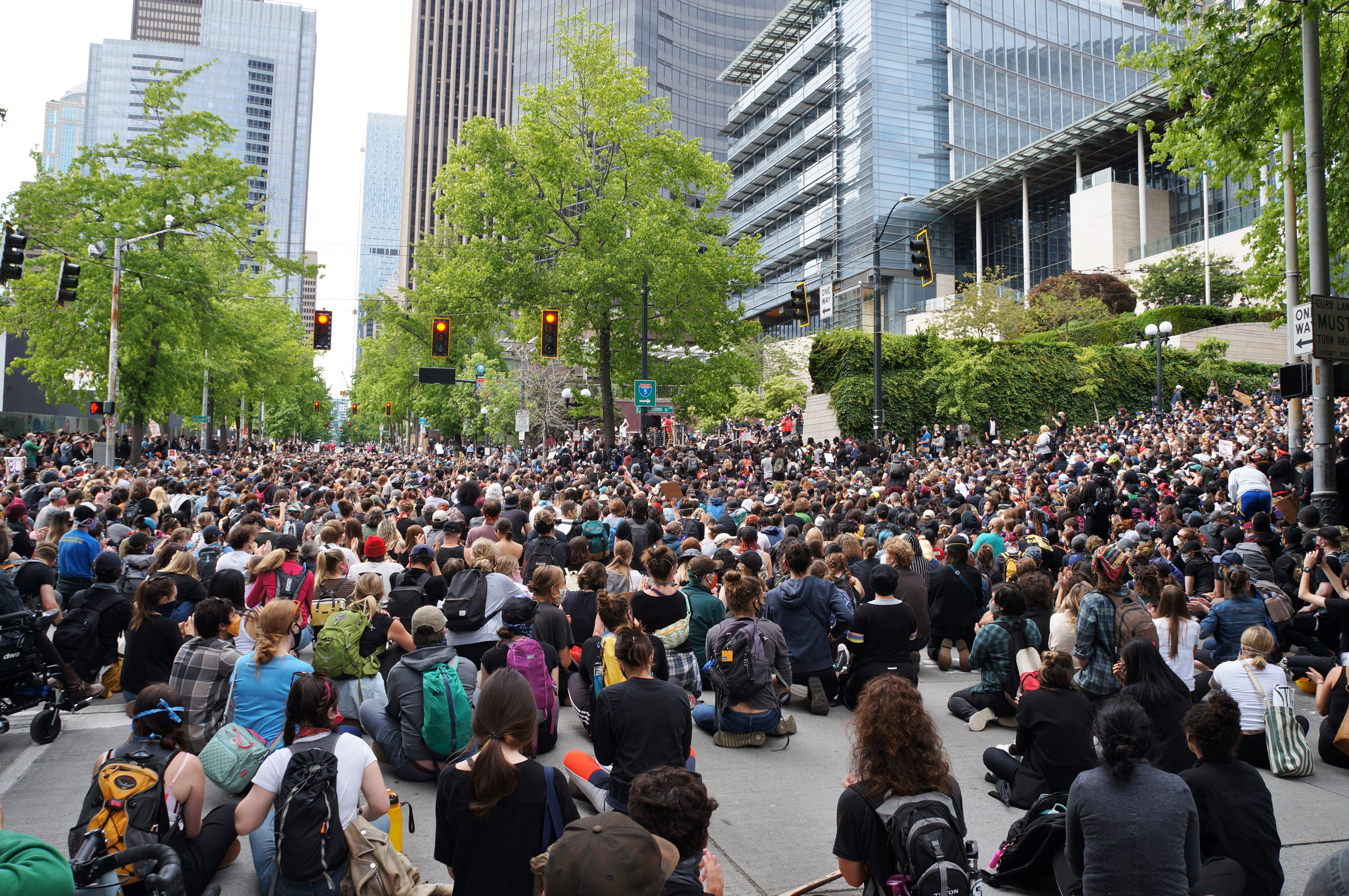
- Protesters at a sit-in at Seattle City Hall on June 3, 2020
- Date: May 29 - December 11, 2020
- Location: Seattle, Washington, U.S.
- Caused by: Police brutality; Institutional racism against African Americans; Reaction to the murder of George Floyd; Economic, racial and social inequality
- Status: Ended

The city of Seattle experienced protests over the murder of George Floyd in 2020 and 2021. Beginning on May 29, 2020, demonstrators took to the streets throughout the city for marches and sit-ins, often of a peaceful nature but which also devolved into riots. Participants expressed opposition to systemic racism, police brutality and violence against people of color.

By June 8, there had been eleven straight days with major protests in Seattle. The Capitol Hill neighborhood experienced a week-long series of clashes between demonstrators and police near the East Precinct that culminated in the formation of the Capitol Hill Organized Protest (CHOP) area, after police abandoned the precinct on June 8. The month of June brought further protests including a Black Lives Matter general strike and silent protest march with 60,000 people on June 12 and several actions throughout the city for Juneteenth. The CHOP zone was reclaimed by police on July 1 after two fatal shootings. It was followed by a fatal vehicle collision with protesters on Interstate 5 over the July 4 holiday.

Major protests reemerged in opposition to the deployment of federal law enforcement in the city by the Trump administration. Additional actions occurred on July 19, July 22, and again on July 25, when several businesses were vandalized and five construction trailers were set on fire at a youth jail.

== Events ==
George Floyd was murdered on May 25 in Minneapolis, Minnesota. Bystander video of Floyd's arrest went viral on May 26, and it showed Floyd repeatedly saying "I can't breathe" as a white police officer pressed a knee into his neck. The officer continued to kneel on Floyd's neck minutes after he appeared to go unconscious. Protests against police brutality began in Minneapolis on May 26, and protests started in other U.S. cities on May 27.

=== Weekend of May 29–31 ===
==== May 29 ====
On May 29, demonstrators gathered at 7 pm near Hing Hay Park in Seattle's Chinatown–International District (CID) to protest the murder of George Floyd. According to a later report by the City of Seattle's Office of Inspector General, there were over 150 protestors at the park, and they marched downtown chanting slogans like "Black Lives Matter" and "George Floyd". Protestors clashed with Seattle Police Department (SPD) officers, especially when police formed lines dividing the march from other streets. When SPD formed a line blocking the march itself at 8 pm, an argument grew that resulted in a broken window nearby, with police firing pepper spray and flash bangs at protestors.

After the protest dispersed, smaller groups damaged buildings and cars that evening, with some throwing rocks and fireworks at the King County Children and Family Justice Center. 100 protestors marched to SPD's East Precinct building in Capitol Hill, and SPD tried to redirect protestors back to the CID. A separate group of mostly white men had left the Hing Hay Park protest and methodically destroyed storefronts and security cameras across one mile of the CID, not encountering police for 45 minutes until they had broken a bank window. This resulted in broken windows on storefronts near Fifth Avenue South and South Jackson Street. Damaged businesses included a Bank of America branch, a dim sum restaurant, and an insurance office.

That weekend, Seattle Public Utilities, city partners, and volunteers worked in the CID to remove graffiti, clean broken glass, and put up plywood boards over the storefronts of 130 businesses who requested it. On June 5, over 100 artists volunteered to paint murals on the plywood using donated supplies. Over 100 businesses signed up to have free murals painted, and subjects included Black Lives Matter messaging; images of Asian people, Asian Americans and Black people; cultural symbols; and food and nature.

==== May 30 protests ====
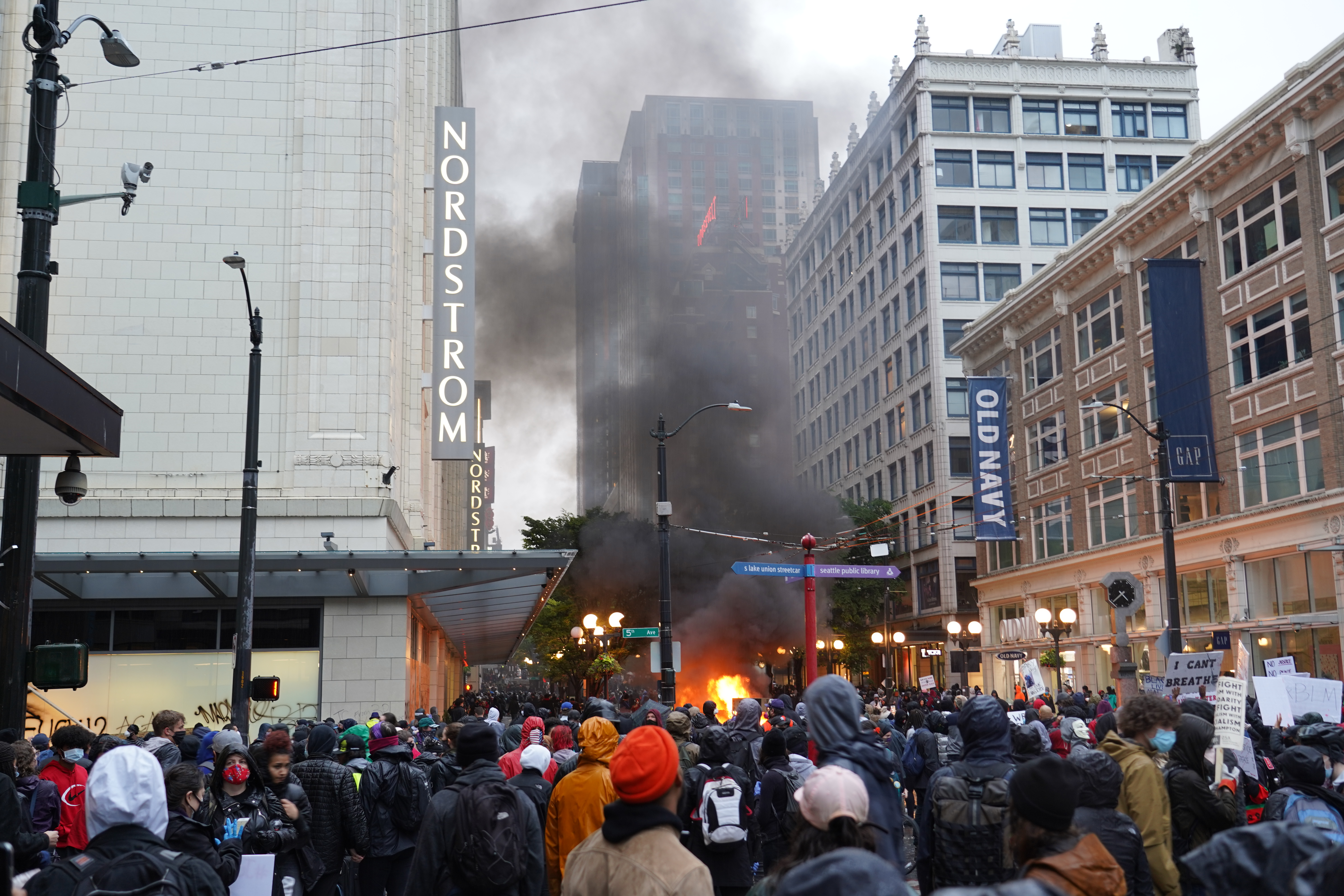
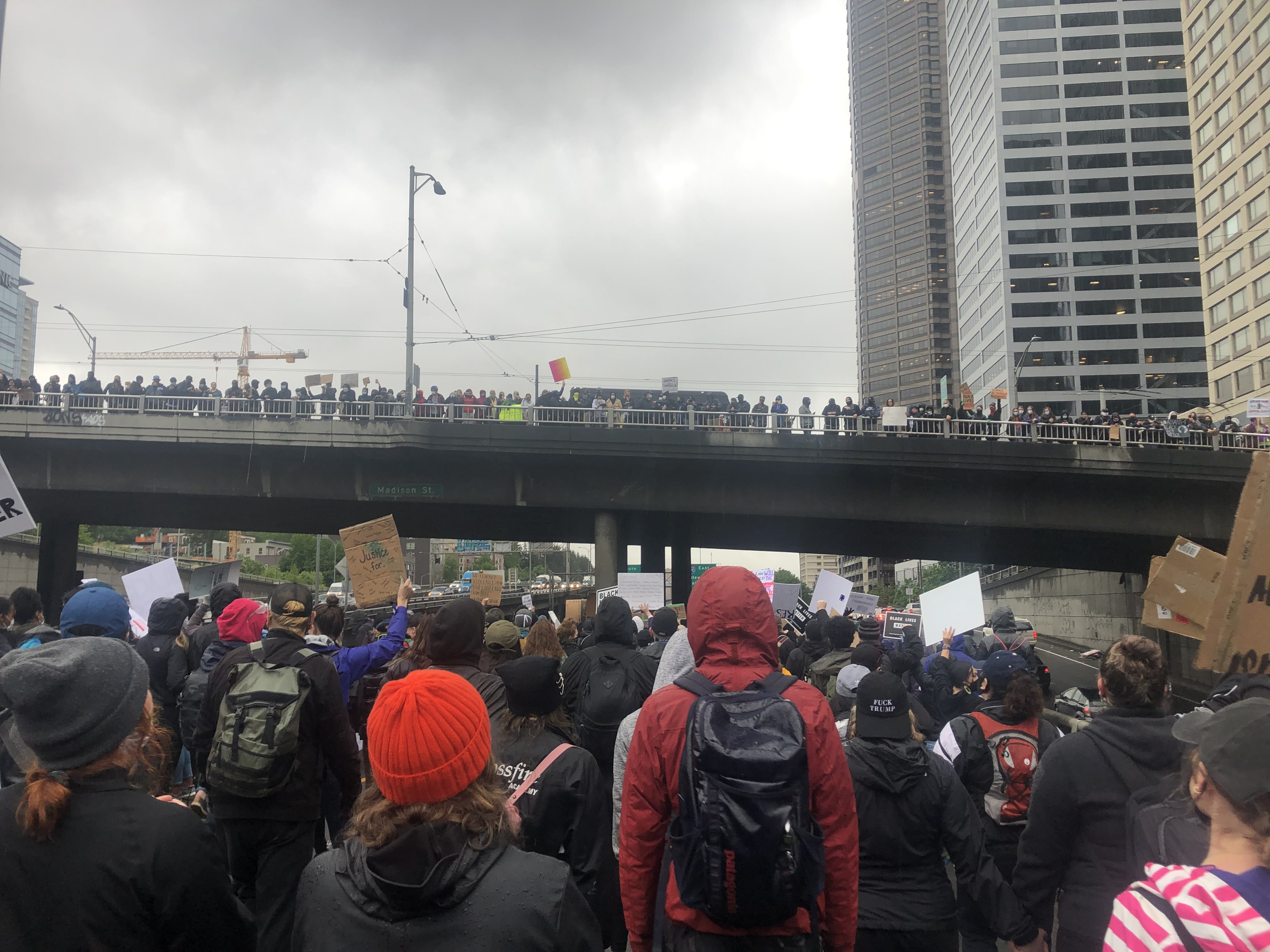
May 30 riots: Smoke from a burning police car near the Nordstrom store (top); Police secure a street (middle); Eye-level view of the Seattle Interstate 5 protest (bottom)

Two protests were planned for Saturday in Downtown Seattle by advocates of police reform, and Nathan Hale High School hosted a third. Justice for George Floyd hosted a noon protest outside SPD headquarters. Not This Time!, founded by the brother of a man previously killed by SPD, hosted speakers at 3 pm in Westlake Park before a planned march to the King County District Court. The afternoon protests were largely peaceful, and thousands joined. However, clashes between protesters and police led to acts of looting and arson downtown, including of the Nordstrom flagship store. Protestors also marched onto Interstate 5 and blocked it in both directions.

Initially, over one thousand protestors listened to speakers in the rain outside SPD Headquarters, divided from the building by a line of police officers. Protestors left in small groups for the Westlake protest. SPD officers reported a few people throwing bottles and rocks at them. By 2 pm, SPD cordoned off the nearby northern entrances to Westlake Park, forcing protestors to enter around the block to align their flow with street traffic. As some protestors got stuck outside, they chanted "Let us through" against the police cordon. Other chants throughout the day included "We do this for our children: we do this for our children's children", "I can't breathe!", "George Floyd" and "Black Lives Matter".

When the police line pushed into the crowd to arrest a man who had previously clashed with them, they surprised and angered the protestors, and one woman grabbed a police baton as she pushed back. An officer pepper-sprayed her face, and also hit an 8-year-old and his father. Video of protestors treating the child went viral and resulted in over 13,000 complaints of police brutality to Seattle's Office of Police Accountability (OPA). The incident was reported as under review by the OPA on June 2, and in September the office decided the officer did not violate policy because he could not see the child. In June Seattle police arrested Evan Hreha, a hot dog stand operator who recorded the video of the child, on suspicion of unlawfully discharging a laser. He was later released without charge.

Standoffs intensified when the crowd had grown to around 5,000 people. SPD leadership thought the crowd was too large for their capacity, and decided to keep officers in place and not engage with protestors. Many officers later said that they wanted to voice solidarity with protestors over their moral outrage at George Floyd's murder, but felt they could not show any support that would violate SPD's protest neutrality policy. At 2:30 the police opened one cordon to allow protestors to pass, but another individual clash led to wider deployment of blast balls and pepper spray against protestors throwing water bottles. The explosions dispersed protestors at the intersection and scared protestors in the park, some of whom started running. Protestors returned to the cordon, chanting "hands up, don't shoot" with their hands in the air and no physical engagement with officers. Some protestors de-escalated through the crowd as others verbally confronted officers, but officers did not reply until they ordered the crowd to disperse around 3 pm. The dispersal order was not issued loudly enough to be heard by the crowd. SPD then deployed tear gas, blast balls, and pepper spray against protestors, affecting large numbers of people.

===== Riot declaration =====
The intersection crowd broke into many small groups heading towards 6th Ave, where police vehicles were parked. Around 4 pm, a group vandalized the cars. Individuals stole three rifles from one, and shot once into a car. A security guard for the Q13 Fox news crew drew his pistol on the shooter and seized his weapon. The others were returned or retrieved later. Two men who stole the rifles were later sentenced. After the cars were vandalized, some lit six SPD cars on fire, and others shattered dozens of retail storefronts, looting from the stores. One man brought molotov cocktails and lit at least two SPD cars on fire this way. He was later sentenced for possession of destructive devices.

At the same time, hundreds of protestors peacefully marched onto I-5 and blocked southbound traffic. 1,200 protestors gathered at SPD headquarters and threw bottles, rocks and paintballs at SPD officers. Mayor Jenny Durkan announced a 5 pm curfew with a weapons ban at 4:46 pm, although there were almost no transit methods for protestors to leave downtown by this time. While conceding that the local protests were largely peaceful, she stated that the curfew was in response to the instances of violence and was "intended to preserve the health and safety of our residents by keeping our streets safe and accessible for essential workers and first responders and preventing the further spread of COVID-19." She also requested state National Guard assistance, with 200 unarmed members providing backup for the SPD. The Not This Time! rally ended peacefully and led a march of hundreds or thousands to the King County Courthouse after the curfew, with SPD managing the march without conflict. The protests ended by nighttime, with SPD, Bellevue SWAT, and the Washington State Patrol responding to individual reports of looting, vandalism and arson. Volunteers cleaned up after the downtown protests that night and the next morning.

While Seattle police were attempting to detain looters, an officer restrained a white suspect, placing a knee on his neck for 13 seconds while bystanders urged the officer to stop. This continued, documented on video, until a second officer intervened to push the first officer's knee to the suspect's back. George Floyd himself had died after being restrained with a knee on his neck during an arrest. According to The Huffington Post, further video footage showed that the same Seattle officer had just used his knee on the neck of another white looting suspect. The OPA found that the officer used disproportionate force and had inappropriately sworn at and threatened protestors. A Black woman was also hit in the eye by a rubber bullet fired by a member of the Washington State Patrol: she claimed she had been hit seconds after holding up her sign listing victims of police violence. She received surgery for permanent damage to her eye, and settled a lawsuit with the state of Washington for $825,000.

==== May 31 protests and cleanup ====
Protests continued on May 31. Hundreds of people protested peacefully in the afternoon downtown, but later the police arrested several people and dispersed protests with incendiary devices. I-5 again closed in both directions due to protests. The second 5 p.m. curfew happened this night, and SPD Chief Carmen Best said the police would enforce it. Several thousand people protested on Capitol Hill starting an hour before the curfew, marching to SPD's East Precinct building and kneeling or sitting there. SPD did not deploy tear gas or flash bangs here, and protestors encouraged each other to not engage with police. Protestors tried to march downtown after the curfew, but police lines blocked their access until some found other routes downtown. Later, SPD allowed protestors to enter Westlake, and then blocked protestors from leaving except by the southern exit. SPD pushed this group on a mile-long uphill route away from downtown. By late evening SPD estimated there were fewer than 100 protestors remaining.

The morning of the 31st, a cleanup effort was organized to support businesses in the downtown core and International District: three dozen storefronts had been damaged downtown. Hundreds of volunteers helped clean graffiti and broken glass. City crews helped businesses cover storefronts with plywood boards. Many business owners expressed support for the cause of the protests but condemned vandals who looted while the protests occurred, and some complained that the city was not able to stop the damage.

=== Capitol Hill clashes June 1–7 ===
==== June 1 ====
On June 1, police and protesters clashed in Cal Anderson Park on Capitol Hill after hours of demonstrations and a march to the Seattle PD East Precinct. SPD affected thousands of protestors, who were overwhelmingly nonviolent, with blast balls, pepper spray, and CS gas (tear gas).

On June 1, Mayor Durkan again imposed a curfew, this time starting at 6 pm. Hundreds of protestors gathered at Westlake and marched to City Hall in the afternoon, where thousands then marched to SPD's East Precinct. Protestors regulated the crowd and maintained a five-foot distance from police officers during the march. SPD blocked protestors from reaching the East Precinct with a line at 13th Ave and Pine Street. At one point, police announced an officer would take a knee with protestors, but many booed and chanted "a knee is not enough". Some protesters had begun using umbrellas to shield themselves from tear gas, adopting a tactic used during Hong Kong's Umbrella Revolution. After 9 pm, a protestor's pink umbrella was grabbed by police, causing a tug-of-war followed by SPD's use of tear gas and flash bangs against protestors. The police then declared the protest a riot. Frontline footage of the pink umbrella event was captured by Omari Salisbury of Converge Media, which clearly shows the sequence of actions on both the police and protester sides that led to the escalation. Videos of the incident drew public attention and outrage. More umbrellas appeared the following day and pink umbrellas specifically became a symbol of the Seattle protests.

A later review by Seattle's Office of Police Accountability (OPA) found that SPD officer John Brooks should not have ordered SPD to disperse the crowd during the "pink umbrella incident", and should not have led SPD to use pepper spray and blast balls against protestors. The report found there was not "substantial risk" of violence or property destruction from the protestors, there was no formal order given to the crowd to disperse, and less-lethal weapons had been used near many who posed no active threat of harm. Although two major allegations were sustained against Brooks, SPD Chief Adrian Diaz overturned the OPA's findings so that additional training was the only recommended discipline for Brooks. Instead, Diaz blamed and demoted Captain Steve Hirjak, who was SPD's incident commander for the protests at that time as well as SPD's first Asian American assistant chief. Hirjak sued the city for racial discrimination and retaliation in 2021, saying he had been used as a scapegoat for Brooks' misconduct. The city settled his lawsuit in 2023 for $600,000.

==== June 2–3 ====
On June 2, a protest led by activists Rashyla Levitt and David Lewis marched from Westlake Park to Seattle City Hall with the intention of forcing Durkan to exit the building and talk to the activists. After an hour and a half Durkan spoke to the protesters and agreed to meet with leaders of the movement the next day. This was the first time Durkan had spoken to protesters after five days of demonstrations. Many protesters were unfamiliar with Levitt and Lewis; Black Lives Matter released a statement that they had no affiliation with the pair. Suspicions over Levitt and Lewis were first reported by Seattle journalist Erica C. Barnett and quickly escalated to accusations of Lewis and Levitt being either police "plants" working against the movement, or simply naive novices who were "in over their head." Both Levitt and Lewis denied being police collaborators and no evidence proving their guilt has been provided. Levitt stated that she did not initially intend to be a leader and it happened organically; she had been receiving death threats since the rumors began.

After the June 3 meeting with leaders of the protests that Levitt and Lewis initiated, Durkan ended the citywide curfew and announced the city's withdrawal from ending the consent decree on the SPD. On June 29 Levitt had a physical altercation with Fox News reporter Dan Springer and was arrested on July 1 during the police clearance of the Capitol Hill Occupied Protest. Community activist Andrè Taylor referred to Lewis and Levitt as "youngsters" and chastised Lewis when demonstrators refused to comply with his demand that they evacuate CHOP.

==== June 5–7 ====
On June 5, Mayor Durkan announced a 30-day ban on police use of tear gas, saying officers "do not need to be using tear gas at protests as a crowd management tool."

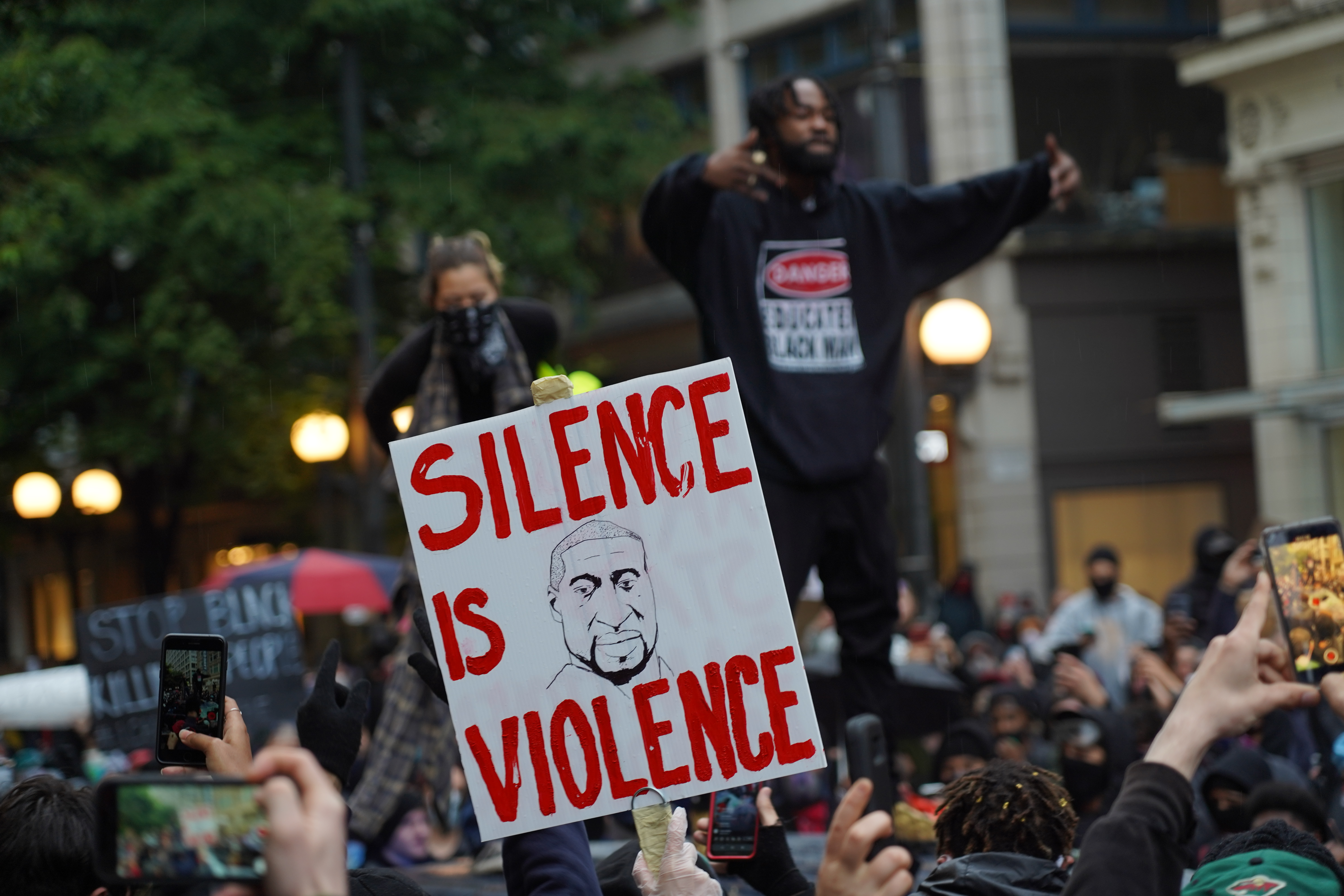
Protesters in downtown Seattle

In light of the 30 day ban on tear gas, on June 6 Seattle police used pepper spray and blast balls to disperse protesters outside the East Precinct on Capitol Hill. City Council President Lorena González criticized the police response, tweeting "This is NOT what de-escalation looks like!" Also on June 6, the Seattle Police Department posted photographs of a candle on Twitter which it described as an "improvised explosive" and an "incendiary device" that had been thrown at officers.

On June 7, during a demonstration at the East Precinct on Capitol Hill, a man, later identified as Nikolas Fernandez, drove a black Honda Civic into the crowd. As the vehicle was in motion, protester Daniel Gregory reached in the driver's side window. Fernandez then shot Gregory in the arm, exited the vehicle and ran past the barricades to the police line. Fernandez, whose brother works at the East Precinct, shot Gregory with a Glock 26 that had extended magazines taped together jungle style.

Later that evening (on June 7), police "unleashed a barrage of tear gas and flash bangs" on a crowd outside the East Precinct on Capitol Hill despite the 30 day ban on tear gas. Aubreanna Inda, a 26-year-old protester, experienced cardiac arrest after being shot repeatedly with flash grenades by police while kneeling. Police Chief Carmen Best defended the use of tear gas, saying that the 30 day ban exempts SWAT officers and "life safety issues." City Councilwoman Kshama Sawant was among the victims and claimed that there was no provocation from protesters before tear gas was deployed. The following day, Kshama Sawant alongside fellow Councilwomen Teresa Mosqueda and Tammy Morales, called upon Mayor Jenny Durkan to resign over the way the city has handled the protests. Police use of flash grenades and tear gas continued and grew in intensity over the subsequent days.

=== Police retreat from the East Precinct ===
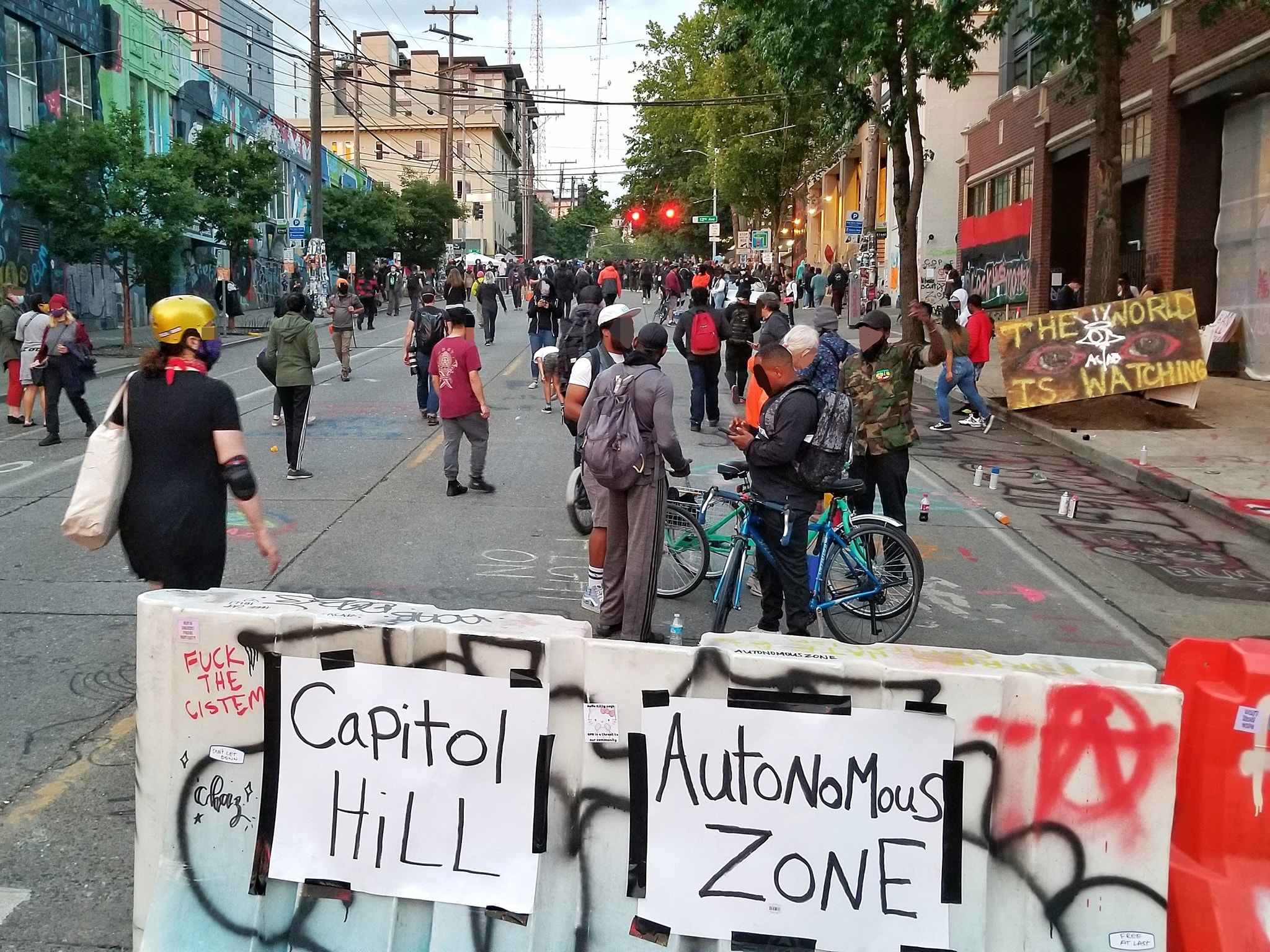
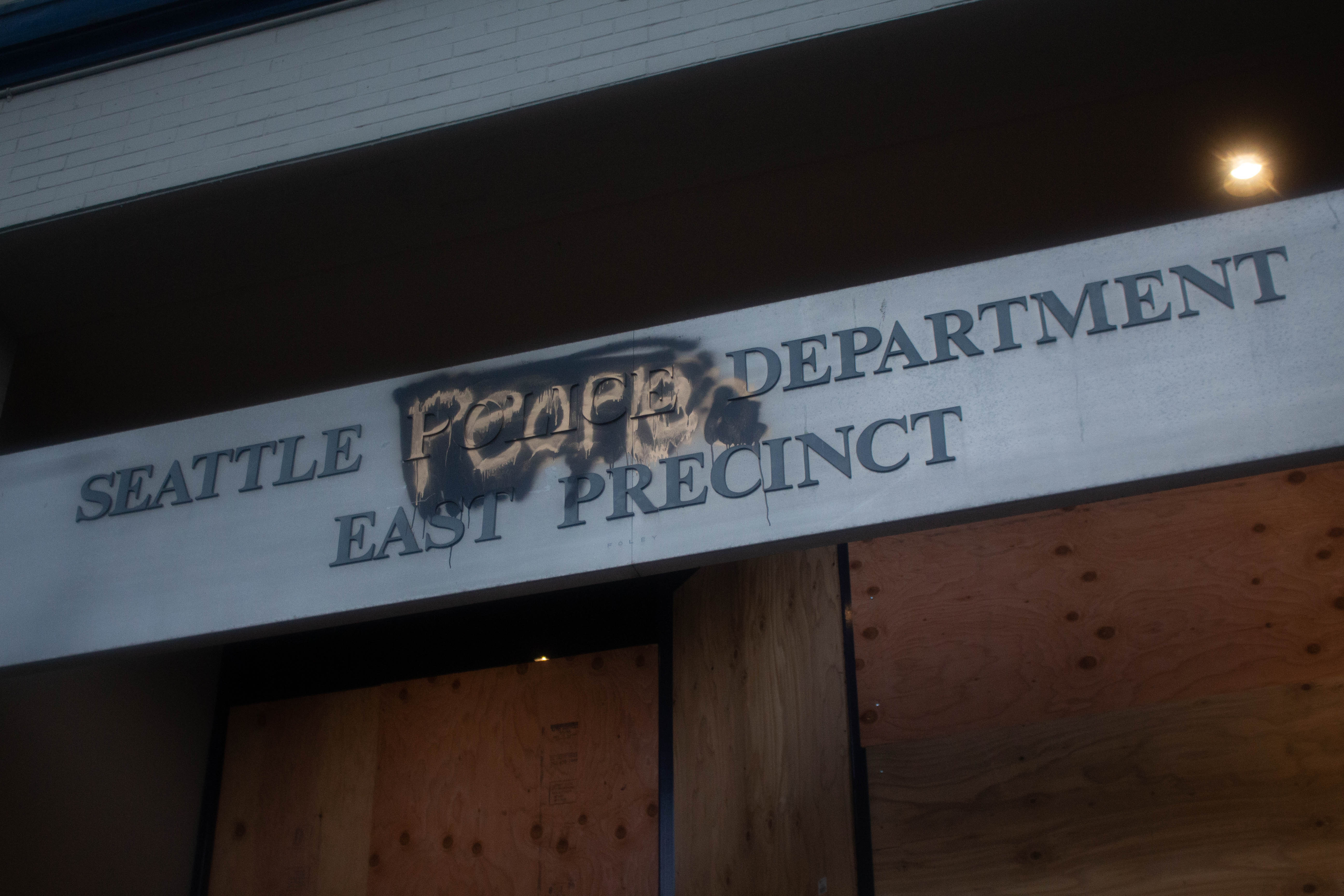
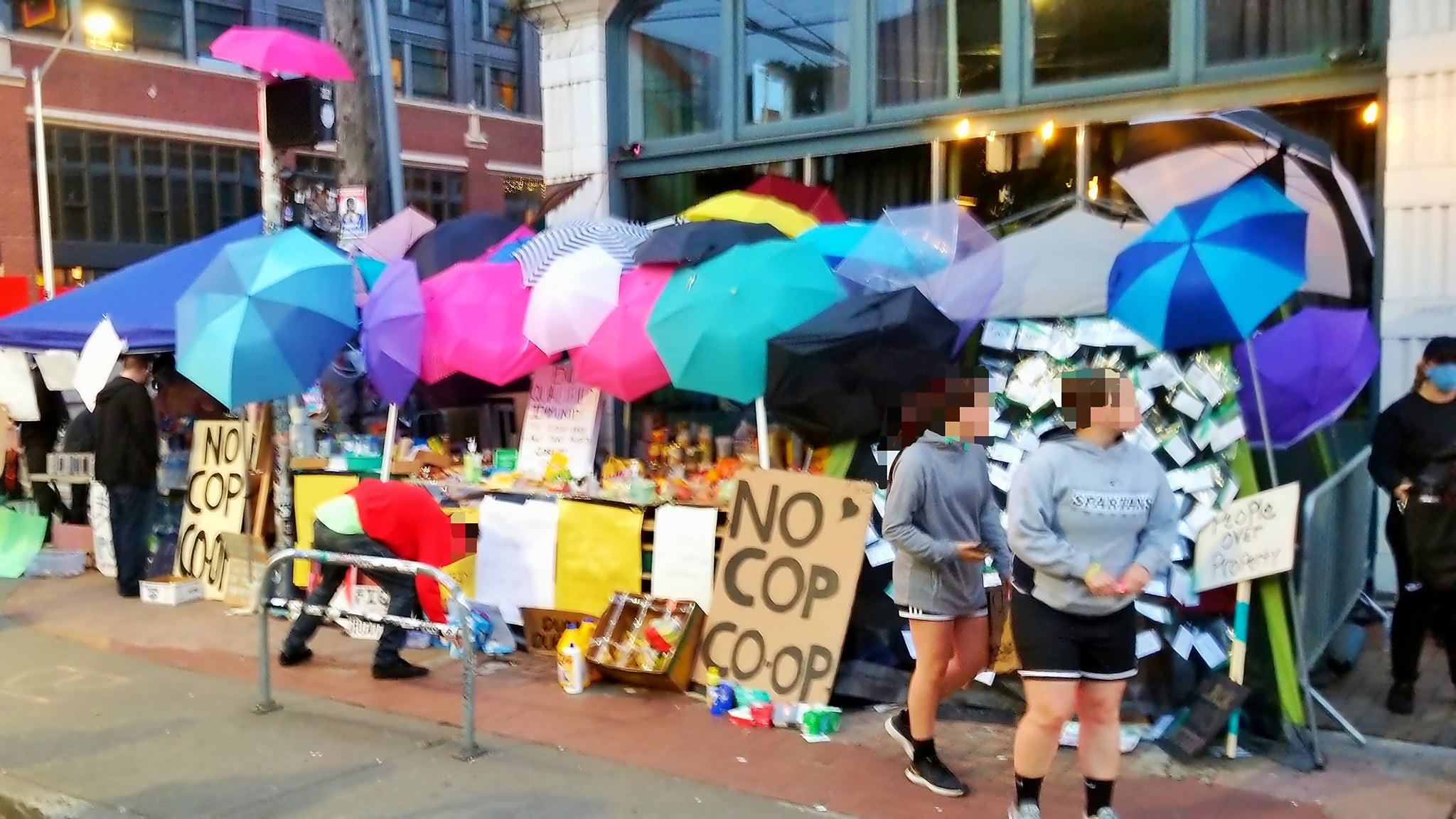
The CHAZ or CHOP in the Capitol Hill neighborhood of Seattle (top); East Precinct sign after police retreat (middle); CHAZ protesters with umbrellas used to defend against chemical attacks (bottom) on June 10

Early in the afternoon on June 8, police began removing all items of value from the East Precinct on Capitol Hill, preparing for the possibility that the East Precinct may need to be abandoned, as happened on May 28 in Minneapolis. The streets surrounding the precinct were reopened and protesters marched up to the precinct that evening. After police withdrew from the East Precinct of Seattle, six blocks adjacent to it were walled off by protesters with barricades to prevent another vehicle attack. The six blocks around the East Precinct were declared by protesters to be the Capitol Hill Occupied Protest.

On June 9, hundreds of protesters temporarily occupied City Hall calling for the resignation of Mayor Jenny Durkan.

In an interview given on June 11, Mayor Durkan remarked, unfazed, that the area was "more like a block party atmosphere" than a military occupation and commented "[w]e could have the summer of love." In contrast, on June 12 police chief Carmen Best alleged that crimes were occurring. Best said: "Rapes, robberies and all sorts of violent acts have been occurring in the area and we have not been able to get to it." In the early morning of June 12, Isaiah Thomas Willoughby, a former Seattle resident, set a fire at the East Precinct building and walked away; community residents extinguished it before it spread beyond the building's external wall or to nearby tents. Later that day, Durkan visited the zone and told a New York Times reporter that she was unaware of any serious crime reported in the area. Most of the people Vox interviewed had participated in the protests but did not feel safe walking in the area at night, especially in late June. One Capitol Hill resident noted a difference in perspective between outsiders and residents: "I feel a lot of the current 'it's not safe' stuff comes from either people who aren't living in the neighborhood itself or from affluent new arrivals, or from business owners."

An exposé by The Seattle Times on June 12 found that Fox News had digitally altered photographs of the Capitol Hill Occupied Protest to include a man armed with an assault rifle. The Fox News website also used a photograph of a burning scene from the Minnesota protests to illustrate their articles on Seattle's protests.

=== June 12 general strike ===
After meeting with Mayor Jenny Durkan on June 6, Black Lives Matter Seattle-King County called for a statewide general strike and silent protest march on June 12. The demands of the protest would be for police to keep their body cams on during protests and stop the sweeps of homeless camps, and for the City of Seattle to divest $100 million of the police budget used for militarization of police and invest the money into social services, to drop their lawsuit against King County over the inquest process, to require that "'Community Oversight' be a part of the police contract bargaining process," and to develop and fund a Black Commission to address racial issues going forward.

In the days leading up to the protest, occupiers of the Capitol Hill Occupied Protest painted a giant colorful mural spelling out "Black Lives Matter" on East Pine Street.

Many Seattle businesses closed for the day or closed early because of the general strike and to allow their employees to leave work and attend the protest. Black Lives Matter Seattle/King County claimed that about 60,000 people joined the silent protest march on June 12.

=== Juneteenth demonstrations ===
Hundreds gathered on June 18, the eve of Juneteenth, for a vigil in Magnuson Park in remembrance of Charleena Lyles, a pregnant mother of four who was shot and killed at home in her apartment by Seattle police exactly three years prior in 2017.

Local activist Andre Taylor, whose brother was killed by Seattle police in 2016, held a rally on June 19 in Judkins Park which was attended by Mayor Durkan and King County Executive Dow Constantine.

Thousands of people marched through the historically black Central District to Jimi Hendrix Park chanting "black lives matter." The march was organized by the King County Equity Now Coalition, a group which called upon the City of Seattle to divest $180 million from the police budget and invest $50 million of that into the local black community. While the Central District is historically black, much of the neighborhood's black community has been pushed out through a long process of redlining, racial covenants, gentrification and a rising cost of living in the city.

Late that night, at 2:20 a.m., two people were shot in Cal Anderson Park within the boundaries of the Capitol Hill Occupied Protest zone. A 19-year-old man died and a second man was in critical condition in the Intensive Care Unit with life-threatening injuries. Seattle police attempted to respond but were, according to the police blotter, "met by a violent crowd that prevented officers safe access to the victims." A later investigation by KUOW showed that miscommunication between Seattle police and Seattle Fire delayed city response to the victim. The victims were taken by a CHOP medic to Harborview Medical Center. The suspect remains at large and Seattle police have not released any description of the suspect.

=== July 4 freeway protest ===
On the early morning of July 4, a car drove onto a closed section of Interstate 5, where several people were protesting, and struck two protesters. 23-year-old Summer Taylor from Seattle was killed, while 32-year-old Diaz Love of Portland, Oregon, who was live-streaming the protest on Facebook, remained for a time in critical condition at Harborview Medical Center; by July 13, Diaz Love self-reported being "in stable, satisfactory condition". Troopers from the Washington State Patrol (WSP) said that the driver drove the wrong way on the Stewart Street off-ramp in order to enter the closed section of I-5. A graphic video posted on social media showed the driver, a black man later identified as Dawit Kelete of Seattle, speeding into the crowd around 1:40 a.m. in a white Jaguar. After Kelete fled the scene, a protester chased him by car for about a mile where they both waited for the arrival of police. Kelete was arrested on two counts of vehicular assault. The WSP announced it would no longer allow protesters to enter I-5, which had been closed off late at night in downtown Seattle (between I-90 and Washington State Route-520) for 19 nights prior to the collision. Kelete pled not guilty, however in 2023, Kelete was sentenced to six and a half years for the crime.

=== Mid-July and August events ===
After several weeks of calm with low-key protests, demonstrators returned to downtown Seattle on July 19. Police reported that peaceful demonstrators began to gather in the morning at Westlake Park but three hours later they were joined by a second group that was organized and more intent on property destruction. Several buildings were vandalized and police officers were injured, before the protesters dispersed after marching to Cal Anderson Park.

The Capitol Hill neighborhood experienced vandalism, fires, and the looting of several businesses when a group of 150 people returned to the area at late at night on July 22. One of the businesses targeted was owned by a relative of the officer who fatally shot Seattle resident Charleena Lyles, a pregnant black woman, at home in 2017.

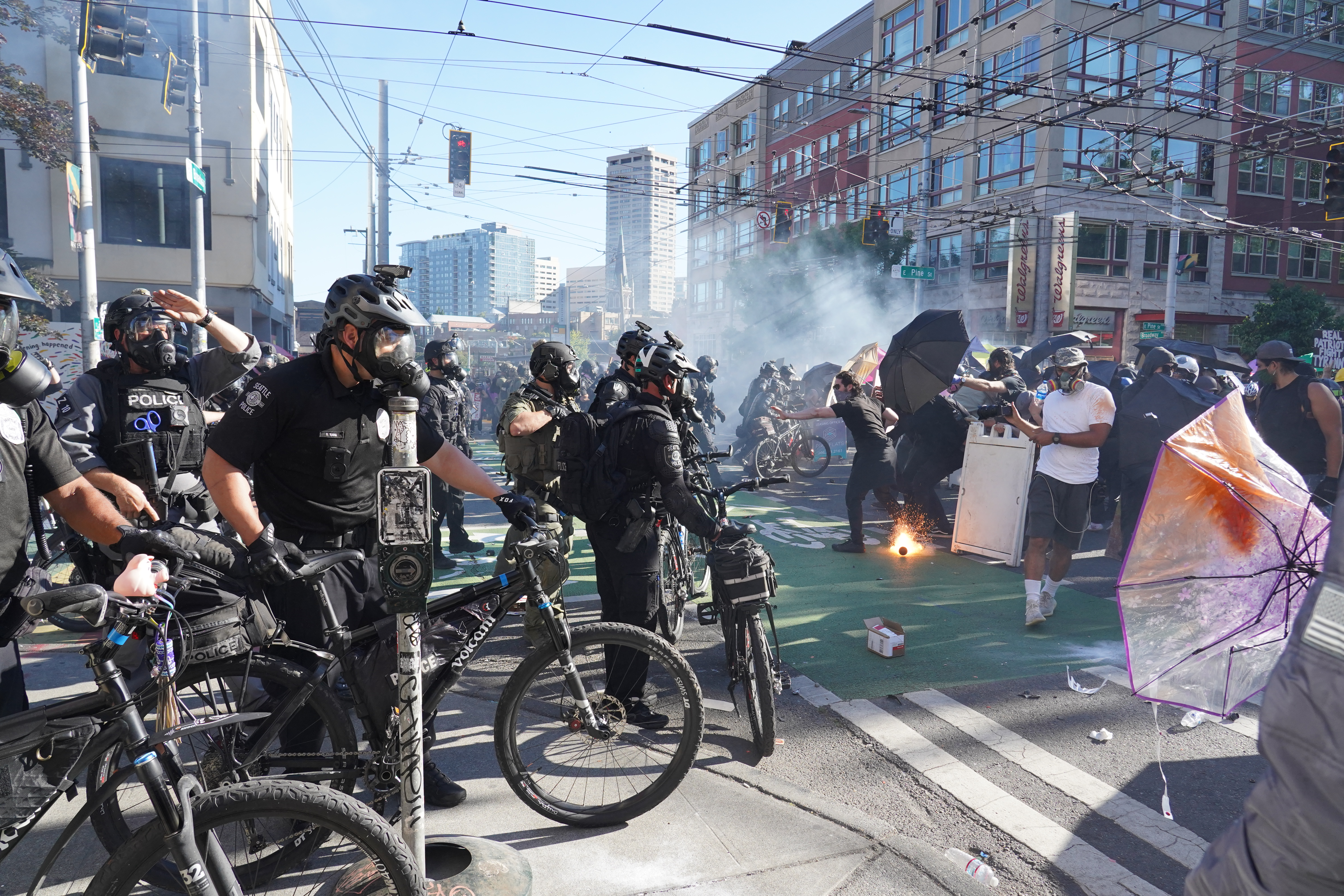
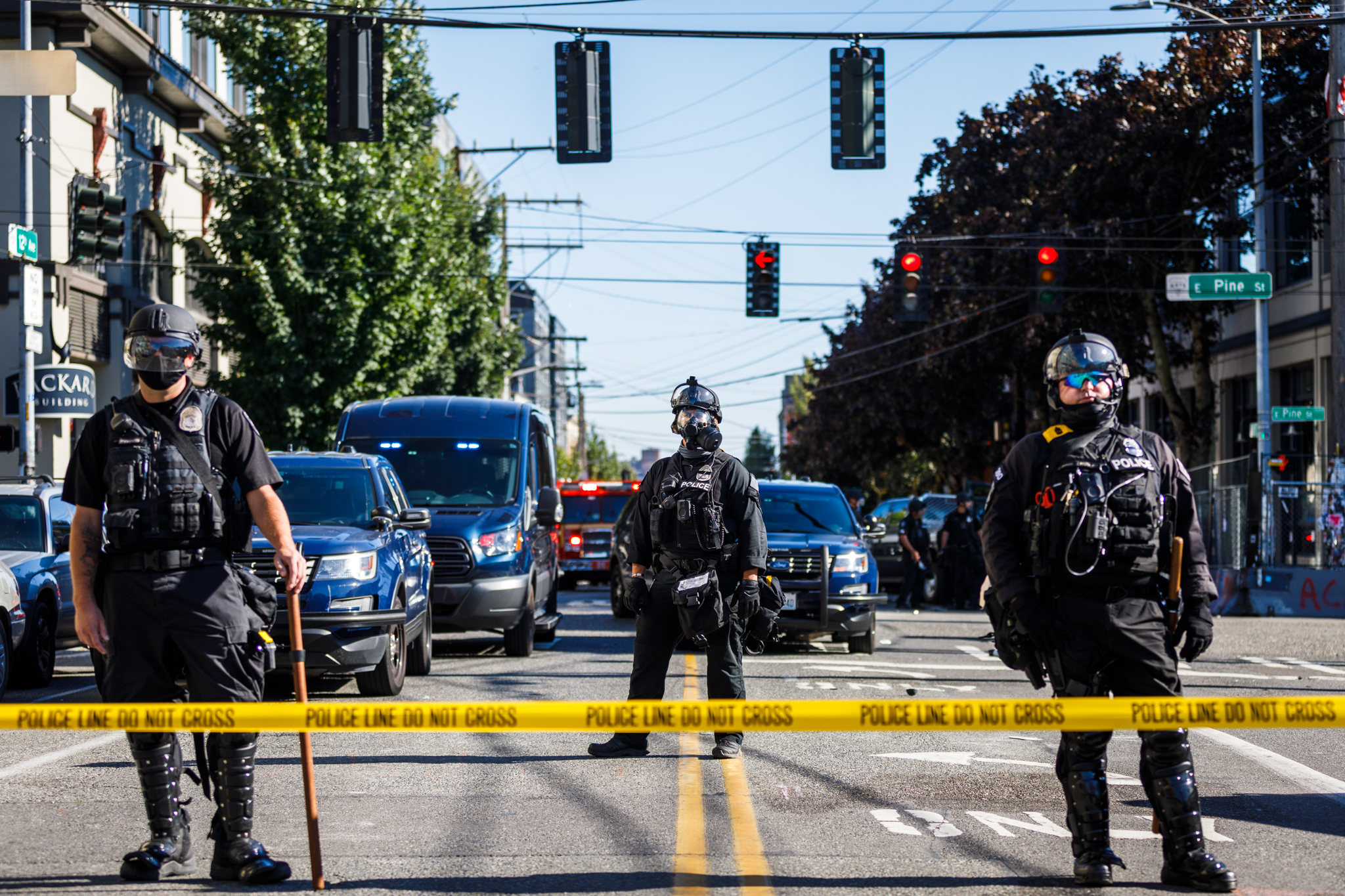
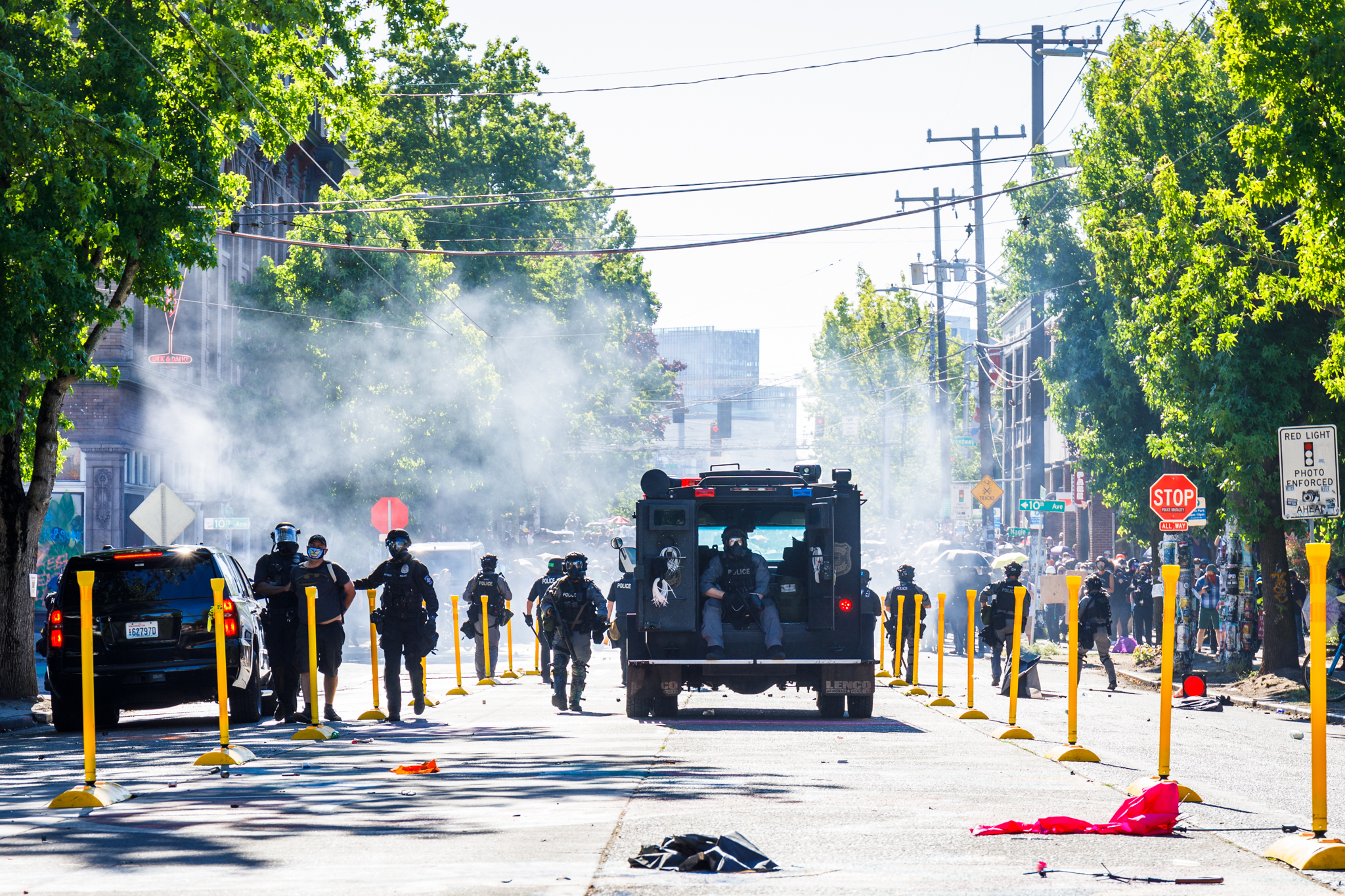
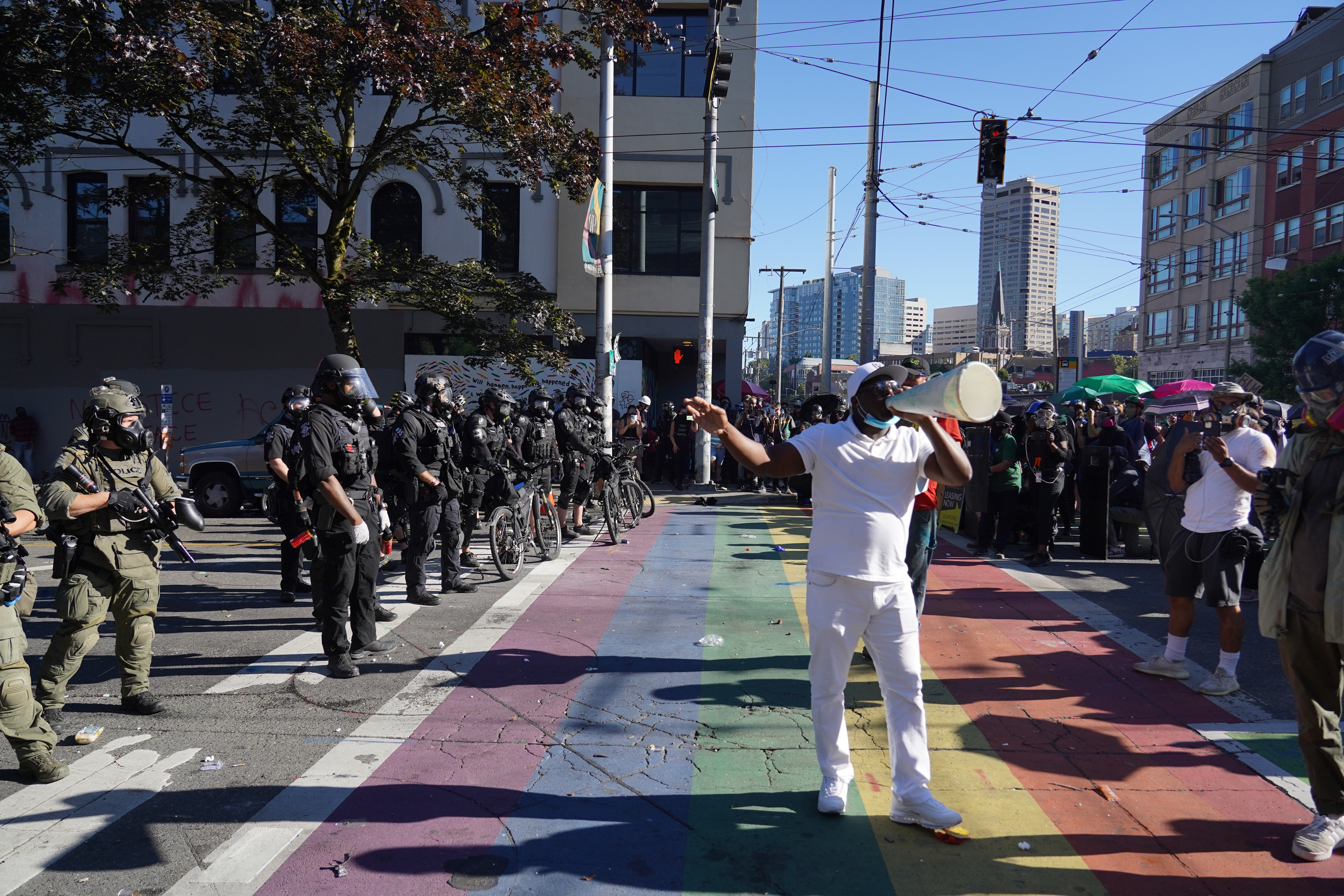
Protesters using umbrellas to protect from Seattle Police Department (SPD) pepper spray, as officers make arrests during clashes and use tear gas, July 25

On July 25, several thousand protesters gathered in the Capitol Hill neighborhood of Seattle for demonstrations in solidarity with Portland, Oregon. Tensions escalated in the neighboring city in early July after the Trump administration deployed federal forces against the wishes of local officials, stirring controversy and regenerating the protests. The Department of Homeland Security deployed an undisclosed number of federal agents to Seattle on July 23, without notifying local officials, adding to anxieties for the city's residents.

A July 25 march by the Youth Liberation Front gathered peacefully for several hours in the early afternoon, but was later designated a riot by the SPD after the protest devolved into property destruction towards several businesses and fires were started in five construction trailers near a future juvenile detention center. Many marchers reportedly participated out of an understanding that the two central issues of the protest, police brutality and federal overreach, were deeply connected.

Among the businesses vandalized was the Starbucks at 12th and Columbia Street, which had all windows shattered, merchandise stolen, and profanity spray painted throughout the building. The personal vehicles of several employees at the youth jail were vandalized with broken windows, graffiti and slashed tires. KIRO reported that 47 people were arrested and 21 police officers were injured.

On July 26, around 5 p.m. protesters returned to Capitol Hill and gathered at Seattle Central College with "Black Lives Matter" and "defund police" signs. About an hour and a half later protesters marched toward the East Precinct and set up a line on East Pine Street near 12th Avenue using signs, recycling and garbage bins. No arrests, clashes, or property damage was reported.

On August 9, hundreds of pro-police and "Back the Blue" supporters gathered at Seattle City Hall to protest and to call on City Council to not defund the SPD. A group of counter-protesters gathered across the street from City Hall to support defunding the police. Police kept the two groups separate. Later that evening, a group of around 100 people marched along Broadway from Cal Anderson Park. Vandals within the group damaged 8 businesses in Seattle's First Hill neighborhood with much of the damage occurring along Madison Street over to Broadway. Police arrested 6 individuals.

== Office of Police Accountability complaints from June 1 ==
On June 1, Seattle's independent Office of Police Accountability announced that it received some 12,000 individual complaints about police behavior during the first few days of George Floyd protests in the city. The following is a list of ten specific incidents that received the highest number of complaints.

- "Pepper spraying a young girl (Saturday)"
- "Punching a person on the ground who was being arrested (Friday)"
- "Placing a knee on the neck area of two people who had been arrested (Saturday)"
- "Covering up badge numbers"
- "Failing to record law enforcement activity on body-worn video"
- "Pepper spraying peaceful protestors (Saturday)"
- "The use of flashbangs, including causing a significant thumb injury (Saturday)"
- "Failing to secure rifles in the rear of a patrol vehicle (Saturday)"
- "Punching a person on the ground who was being arrested (Sunday)"
- "Officers breaking down windows of a Target store"

== Government response ==
Washington State Governor Jay Inslee ordered the activation of the Washington National Guard on May 30 in response to the riot that day.

As a consequence of the May 30 events, all Seattle-bound service by Washington State Ferries, Kitsap Fast Ferries and the Seattle Water Taxi was suspended, with Colman Dock loading westbound traffic to Bainbridge Island and Bremerton only; many downtown streets were closed and bus service was halted; the Westlake and Pioneer Square light rail stations were also closed by Sound Transit. The Washington State Department of Transportation rerouted Interstate 5 freeway traffic away from Downtown Seattle in a 20-mile detour across the Evergreen Point Floating Bridge and Interstate 90 floating bridges, and through the Eastside.

Avatar of Donald J. Trump

Donald J. Trump
(@realDonaldTrump)
tweeted:

Radical Left Governor @JayInslee and the Mayor of Seattle are being taunted and played at a level that our great Country has never seen before. Take back your city NOW. If you don't do it, I will. This is not a game. These ugly Anarchists must be stooped IMMEDIATELY. MOVE FAST!

June 10, 2020

President Donald Trump criticized the response of Governor Inslee and Seattle Mayor Jenny Durkan, claiming that they were not effective in dealing with protesters, especially regarding the Capitol Hill Occupied Protest and the Seattle police's abandonment of the East Precinct. Trump threatened to retake the city if local leaders did not reassert their authority.

Seattle Mayor Jenny Durkan issued an executive order, declaring an end to the zone and authorized police to clear the area. On July 1, the police cleared the protest zone and retook the East Precinct soon-after.

In order to find violent and destructive agitators the FBI monitored the protests and provided intelligence to the Seattle Police Department. The FBI monitored both alleged threats within and against the protests, and they worked with Seattle police when the Capitol Hill Organized Protest zone was cleared.

=== Procedural changes ===
Following a large and peaceful demonstration on June 3, the City of Seattle announced several changes to its policing protocols, including restrictions on badge coverings for officers.

The Seattle City council voted unanimously on June 15 to demilitarize the police department by banning the purchase and use of crowd control weapons including tear gas, pepper spray, flashbang grenades and rubber bullets. The city council also voted to prohibit the use of "choke holds" by Seattle Police. On July 24, in response to a request the U.S. Department of Justice, U.S. District Judge James Robart issued a temporary restraining order, blocking the law from taking effect.

City Attorney Pete Holmes announced that the city would withdraw its request to lift a federal consent decree that had been imposed following a U.S. Department of Justice investigation in 2012. The city government also announced a 30-day ban on the use of tear gas by police on protesters in response to outcry from Capitol Hill residents who had been affected by its use. The ban did not apply to SWAT and other special officers.

The Seattle Public Schools voted on June 24 to terminate contracts with the local police departments.

=== Arrests ===
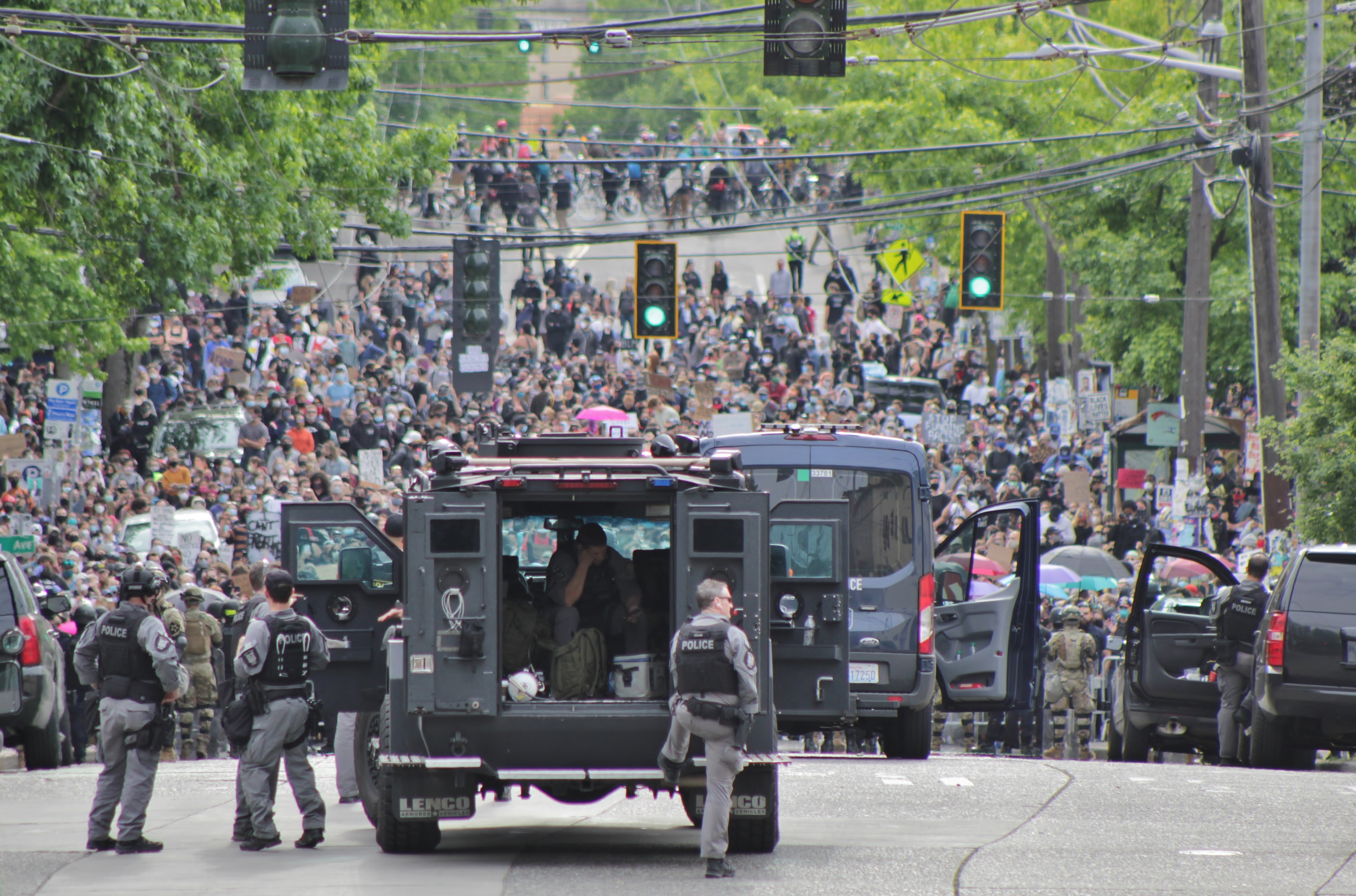
Police and National Guard on Capitol Hill in Seattle on June 3

At least 55 people were arrested in Seattle during the May 30 riots.

A man was arrested near the East Precinct in Capitol Hill on June 7, after he drove into a protest and shot a protester.

On June 11, federal authorities in full SWAT gear arrested Margaret Channon, a 25-year-old Tacoma woman, for allegedly setting fires in five police vehicles during the May 30 riot in Seattle. Channon was charged with five counts of arson in U.S. District Court in Seattle.

On the morning of July 1, there were 44 people arrested in Seattle for refusing to disperse as Seattle police retook the East Precinct and cleared the Capitol Hill Organized Protest zone. That night, 25 more people were arrested near Broadway and East Pine. The following night, on July 2, three people were arrested outside the West Precinct in the Denny Triangle and then later that night seven more were arrested near Broadway and East Pine Street.

A man was arrested on July 4 and charged with two counts of vehicular assault after driving into a crowd of protesters on I-5 in Seattle, killing one protester and critically injuring another.

On July 25, after declaring a riot, police made more than two dozen arrests for "assault on officers, obstruction and failure to disperse" during a protest in the Capitol Hill neighborhood near the former CHOP zone.

=== Seattle police exodus ===
In the months following the protests, at least 118 police officers including Chief Carmen Best left the Seattle Police Department, mostly due to low morale and budget cuts, seeking jobs with neighboring police departments. Retiring from police work, Best began working as a law enforcement analyst at local news station King 5. By October, the Seattle Police Officer Guild warned that some 911 calls may go unanswered and that response times will be longer due to lack of personnel.

== See also ==
- 1999 Seattle WTO protests
- Capitol Hill Occupied Protest
- Killing of Manuel Ellis
- Occupy Seattle
- Seattle General Strike
