= Pudding mit Gabel =

Youth and internet phenomenon

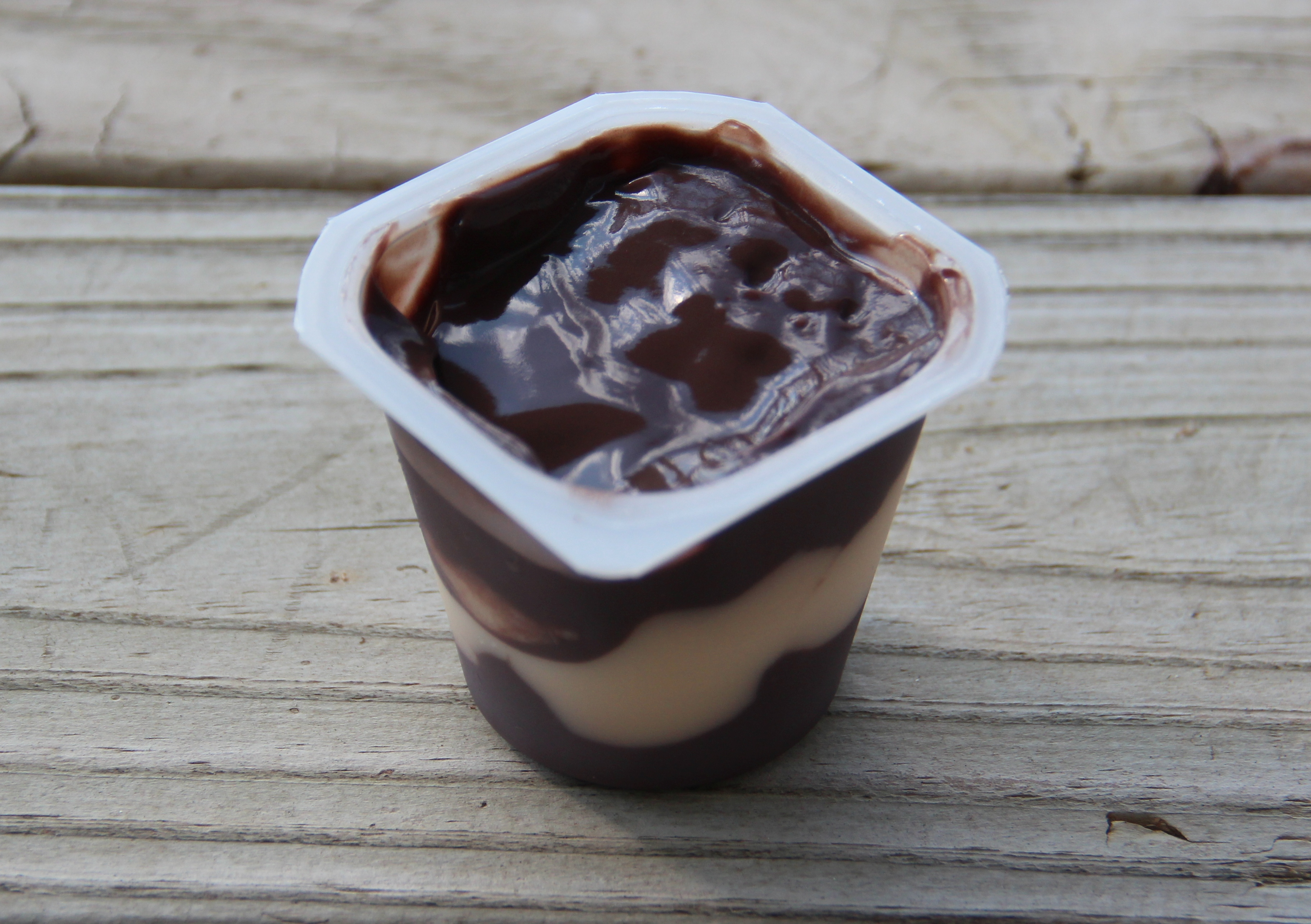
A standard pudding cup.

Pudding mit Gabel (English: Pudding with fork) is an internet meme created in August 2025 in Karlsruhe, Germany, where people gather in groups to eat pudding with forks. The events are primarily organized over social media, and hundreds of people have gathered for some of the events.

== Creation ==
The trend started in the German city of Karlsruhe in August 2025, where a flyer was posted inviting people to a "we eat pudding with a fork meeting [sic]", which soon got attention through a local Instagram account. The event was held on August 28, 2025, and drew about 150-200 people. Videos showed participants tapping their pudding lids with their forks and counting down from ten before eating.

It subsequently developed into a trend on TikTok. Who created the idea is unclear, with some online sources identifying a southern German artist group as the possible creator.

== Spread ==
Pudding with fork events soon spread to other German cities, including Berlin, Munich, Frankfurt, Hamburg, Bremen, Bonn and Stuttgart. Over 1,000 people showed up for a meeting in Hannover. It also spread into German-speaking Austria and Switzerland.

Gatherings have also taken place in the United States, for example in Seattle's Cal Anderson Park and Northeastern University in Boston. The trend has spread internationally predominately via TikTok, with some videos from users in the United States getting millions of views, and one video inviting people to a meeting in New York City's Central Park.

Stephen Colbert would later highlight the trend in his "Meanwhile" segment of The Late Show.

The event also spread to Southeastern Europe, with a gathering taking place on October 25, 2025 in Prishtina, Kosovo.
