= Waterworks (Hollis) =

Fountain and sculpture in Seattle, Washington, U.S.

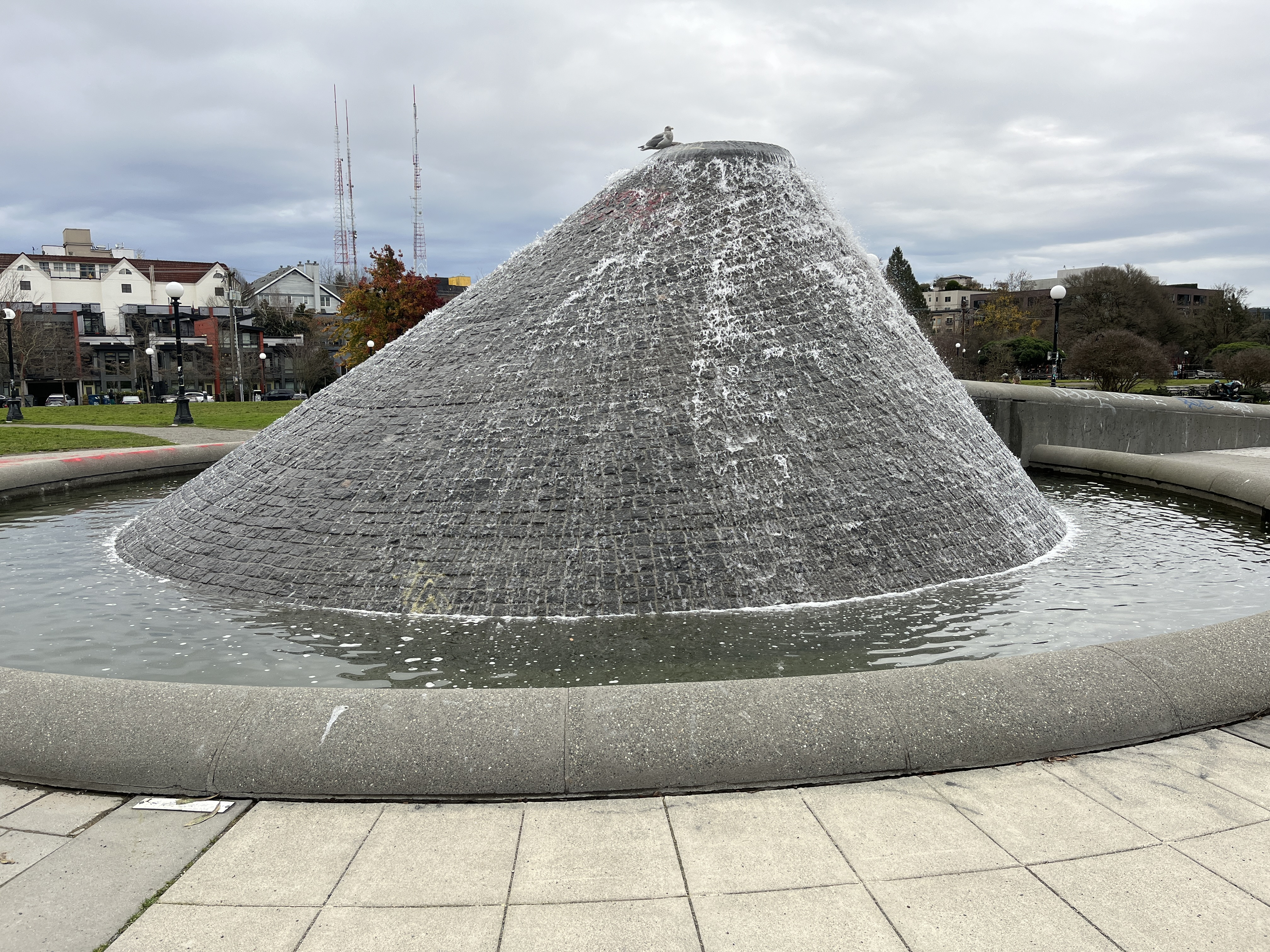
- The fountain in 2023
- Artist: Douglas Hollis
- Location: Seattle, Washington, U.S.
- 47.618082°N 122.319492°W

Waterworks is a 2005 outdoor fountain and sculpture by Douglas Hollis, installed in Seattle's Cal Anderson Park, in the U.S. state of Washington.

== Description and history ==
Constructed during the redesign that resulted in modern day Cal Anderson Park, the former open-air Lincoln Reservoir was replaced by a covered, underground reservoir during Seattle’s reservoir covering program, with park space created above the buried reservoir. The public artwork Waterworks by Douglas Hollis is integrated into this park landscape above the former reservoir site.

Hollis has said: "Underlying much of this design is the sensual delight and amplified awareness of water (which the Greeks referred to as 'sensitive chaos'). In this new park we not only see the water, but we can hear it in different ways, we can touch it, we can have a more intimate relationship with it, observing its ever-changing character as it fall and flows, and reflects…I believe this is a work of joy, contemplation and learning of this most precious resource."

== See also ==
- 2005 in art
