= Hot Rat Summer =

Mosaic in Seattle, Washington, U.S.

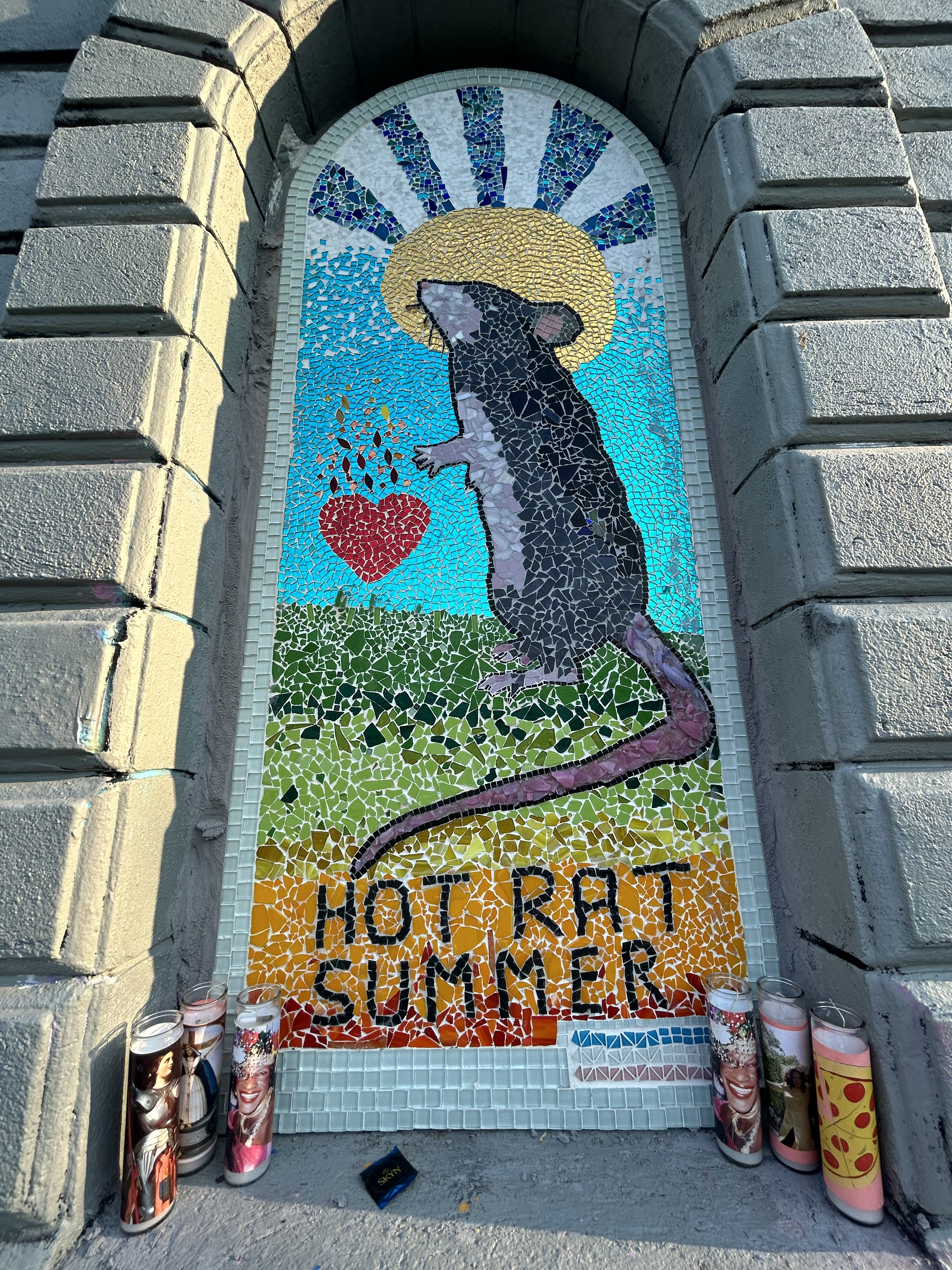
- The artwork in July 2025
- Artist: Unknown
- Year: 2024
- Medium: Mosaic
- Movement: Guerrilla art
- Subject: Rat
- Location: Seattle, Washington, U.S.; 47.6171006°N 122.3195172°W

Hot Rat Summer, also known as St. Rat, is the unofficial name given to a guerrilla mosaic public artwork installed in Cal Anderson Park in Capitol Hill, Seattle in 2024. It is located within one of the north-facing arcs of the historic Capitol Hill Gatehouse. The mosaic became the subject of local controversy after repeated removals by the city and subsequent grassroots restoration efforts. Widely interpreted as a symbol of queer and trans resilience, the mosaic gained cult status and sparked broader discussions around public art, graffiti policy, and civic engagement; eventually gaining the support of city council members Alexis Mercedes Rinck and Joy Hollingsworth, who participated in a community clean-up event to restore the mosaic.

== Description ==
According to the artist, the official name of the mosiac is Community is our Savior. The artwork is a small tile-and-glass mosaic installed on the side of a utility gatehouse in Cal Anderson Park, in Seattle's Capitol Hill neighborhood. It features a rat in a devotional pose, surrounded by a gold halo and adorned with a red sacred heart. The mosaic includes a small trans pride flag embedded in the lower right corner. The mosaic's caption, "Hot Rat Summer", references the Megan Thee Stallion song Hot Girl Summer.

Seattle University art history professor Ken Allan told The Stranger that the piece "refers to Byzantine mosaic tradition in a fun way" and "the use of architecture nicely echoes this".

== History ==
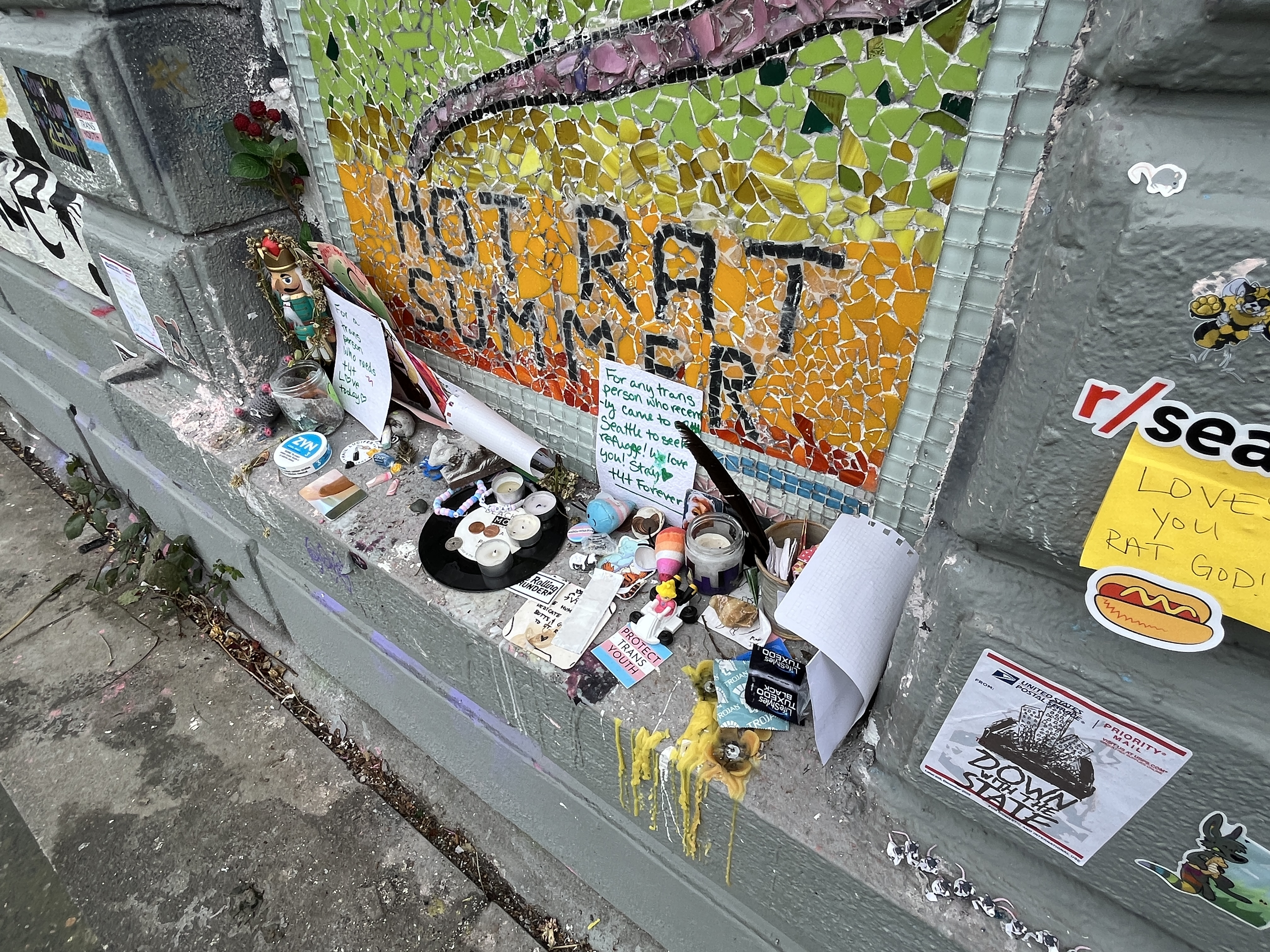
Bottom of the artwork with various items left on the shelf below, 2025

The mosaic is believed to have been installed during the summer of 2024. The artist or collective responsible has not been publicly identified. Its presence was not widely noted until early 2025, when public interest in the piece began to spread via social media and local online forums. The mosaic has a nickname, "Saint Rat."

The City of Seattle initially classified the mosaic as graffiti. Between late 2024 and mid-2025, Seattle Public Utilities crews reportedly painted over the mosaic at least four times. The concealment prompted swift backlash from community members, who stripped away the paint to reveal and restore the artwork.

During this time, the city also moved to increase fines for graffiti and tagging violations, passing an ordinance in July 2025 that raised penalties up to $1,500 per incident. Critics noted the irony of the city's intensified anti-graffiti stance coinciding with public support for the mosaic and the involvement of two council members in its preservation.

The restoration was widely covered in local media, and the city subsequently allowed the mosaic to remain intact. The city has tried to contact the anonymous artist, in hopes they will agree to maintain the mosaic and potentially create new artwork for the gatehouse. Absent such an agreement, community members have emerged as stewards for the artwork, with one "unofficial janitor" visiting daily to clear trash and scrub dirt away from the tiles.

In October of 2025, two additional mosaics appeared on the gatehouse in alcoves besides the one containing Hot Rat Summer. The mosaic on the close left of Hot Rat Summer exhibits a large pigeon flying with a rose in its claws while three smaller rats look up at it. The mosaic on the far left of Hot Rat Summer features a rat in a blue robe with a single tear on its face, looking towards a crow. The bottom of the mosaic is inscribed with caption "Hot Rat Mother".
