= Blast ball =

Less-lethal hand grenade

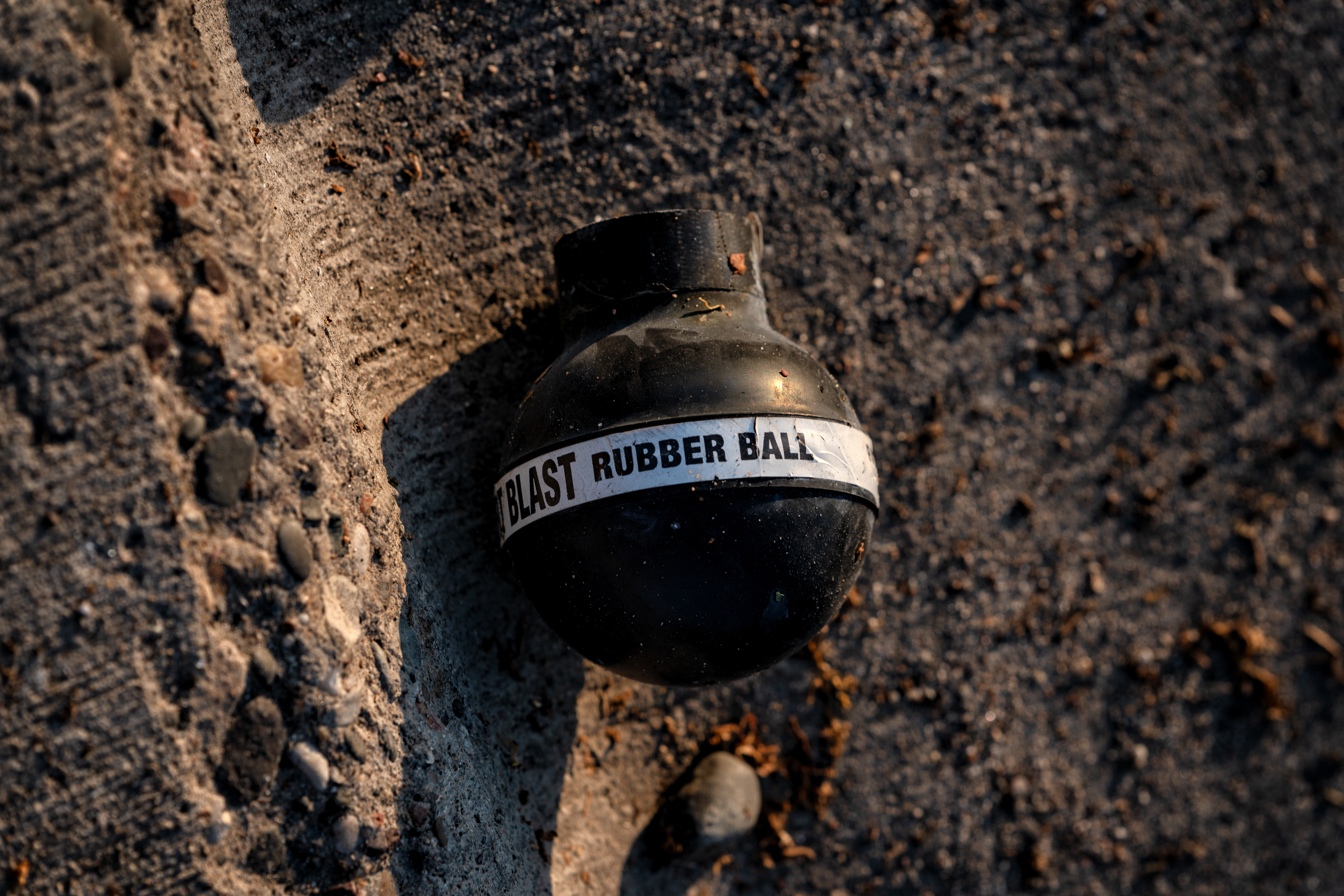
A blast ball used by the Minneapolis Police Department during the George Floyd protests

A blast ball, also known as a tear gas ball, rubber ball grenade, sting ball grenade, or stinger grenade, is a ball-shaped, rubber coated, non-lethal grenade designed for law enforcement and riot control applications. A blast ball is similar to a stun grenade in that, when detonated, it generates a loud noise and bright light; it also releases a chemical irritant (usually pepper gas or tear gas) and sometimes also rubber pellets or fragments.

Blast balls are often used by riot police to keep protestors back or separate "casual" rioters from "hardcore" instigators. They can also be used by police tactical units in close-quarters combat to incapacitate suspects as a less-lethal and less-destructive alternative to actual grenades, which are generally not used by civilian law enforcement.

The use of blast balls in riot control is controversial. Proponents argue they are less harmful than traditional riot control agents or physical force, while opponents argue they are used indiscriminately and are capable of harm.

== Application ==
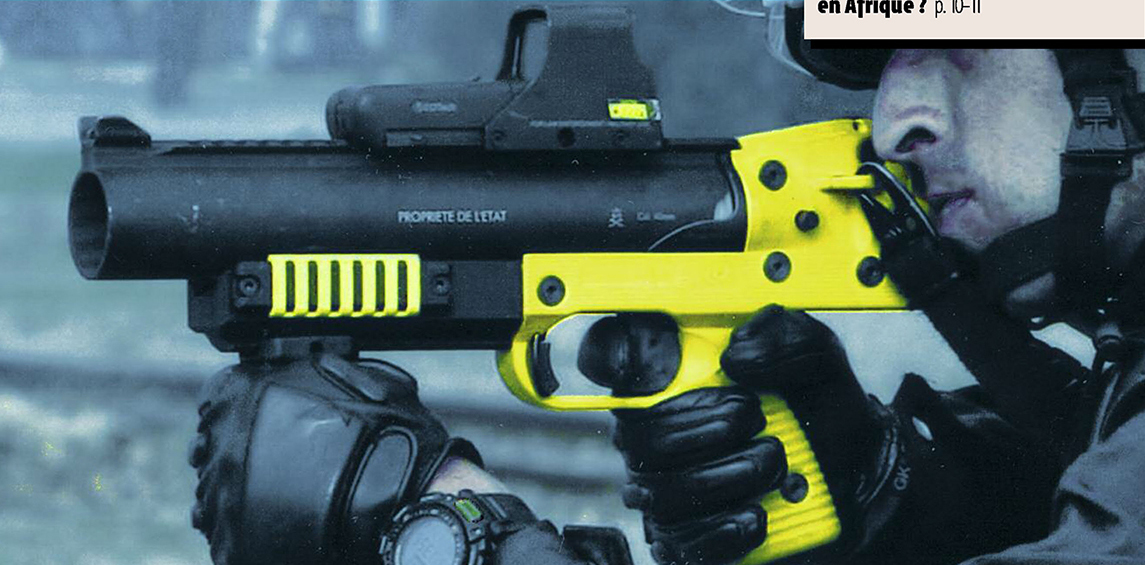
A riot police officer aiming a riot gun loaded with blast balls in 2009

Blast balls being used against a May Day protest in Seattle, 2015

Blast balls can be used against aggressive crowds during situations in which rioters significantly outnumber police or prison guards. In this application, they are intended to frighten away and disperse "casual" rioters, or those who have been "sucked into" the contagion of the crowd, allowing police or prison guards to separate them from, and engage with, the remaining "hardcore instigator" element.

One typical deployment of blast balls occurred during the 2011 Vancouver Stanley Cup riot and was described by a Vancouver Police Department officer:

We started moving forward as a line but the crowd remained still. The gap narrowed to about 5 meters and some people started to move, but many would not move until they were physically contacted. This was very risky for us as we were significantly outnumbered and stretched very thin across six lanes of a major street. Once the order was given, the first blast ball landed about 2 meters in front of the crowd and got some people moving. As more dropped, the crowd turned and ran and we drove them to the end of the block. The police line held at the intersection, which allowed negotiators to use the public address system to warn the crowd and encourage them to leave. We had pushed the crowd past all the burning cars on the block and a large number of the "lesser influenced" crowd had dispersed. What remained were the hardcore instigators and a few hundred enthusiastic participants.

Blast balls can also be used to create "negative stimulus" by detonating in areas toward which police do not want the crowd to move, creating a herding effect.

== Manufacturers ==
Blast balls are marketed by AMTEC Less-Lethal Systems, Combined Tactical Systems, and Defense Technology, among other manufacturers. Blast balls manufactured by AMTEC weigh 212 grams and contain either 14 grams of OC gas or 12 grams of CS gas.

== Safety ==
The use of blast balls as a riot control measure is controversial. Opponents argue that blast balls are used indiscriminately against peaceful protestors and that they are capable of causing physical harm. Proponents and police argue blast balls, when used properly, are less harmful than traditional riot control measures such as pepper spray, tear gas, or baton strikes, which would have to be resorted to without blast balls.

In 2015, a Seattle woman sued the Seattle Police Department (SPD), alleging shrapnel from a blast ball penetrated her leg. The SPD denied her claims, alleging that tests show that a blast ball detonated at contact range against ballistic gel fails to produce trauma or tearing. In 2020, a judge found the SPD in contempt for frequent use of blast balls while attempting to quell the George Floyd protests in Seattle, finding that they were used "when no immediate threat to the officers' safety or public property could be identified".

In 2026, a 15 year-old protester in the French city of Lens lost his hand following the explosion of a blast ball. Early reports suggest that the student was holding the ball in their left hand when it exploded.

== See also ==
- Flash-ball
