= Cal Anderson Park =

Park in Seattle, Washington, U.S.

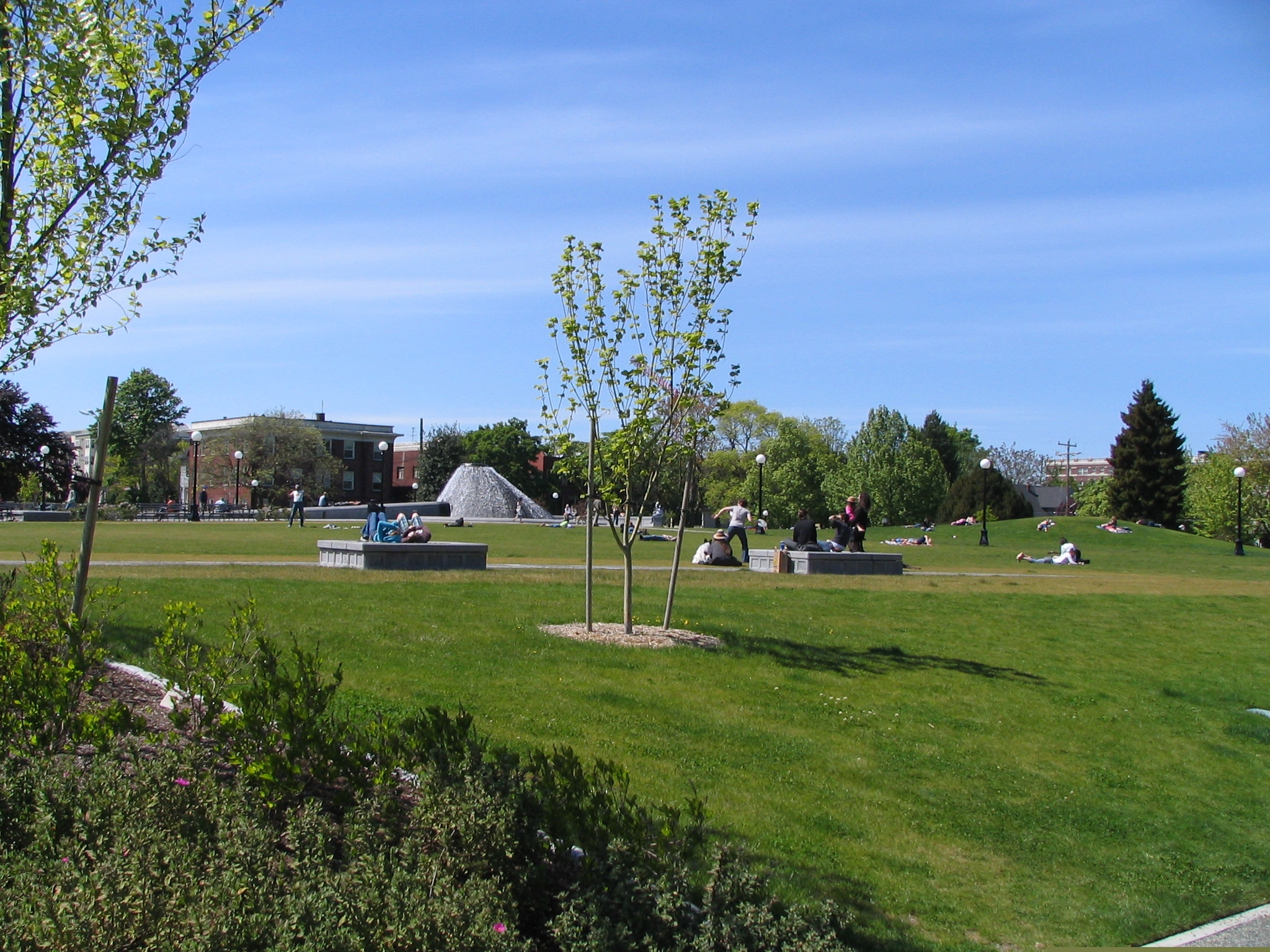
- The park on May 13, 2006
- Interactive map of Cal Anderson Park
- Type: Public Park
- Location: Capitol Hill, Seattle, Washington
- Coordinates: 47.617°N 122.319°W
- Area: 7.37 acres (29,800 m^{2})
- Created: September 24, 2005; 21 years ago
- Operator: Seattle Parks and Recreation
- Open: All year
- Public transit: Capitol Hill Station

Cal Anderson Park is a public park on Seattle’s Capitol Hill that includes Lincoln Reservoir and the Bobby Morris Playfield.

== Features ==
The north end of the open park features Waterworks, a large mountain-shaped water fountain feeding a shallow texture pool, a reflecting pool, and a wading pool. The south end features the lighted Bobby Morris Playfield. The wading pool operates in the summer months from 12:00 to 7:00 p.m. The pumphouse at the south end of the reflecting pool is home to three guerilla mosaics, including Hot Rat Summer.

Other features:

- Shelterhouse
- Plaza
- Children's play area
- Caged tennis courts with outdoor lights
- Basketball courts
- Dodgeball court

== History ==
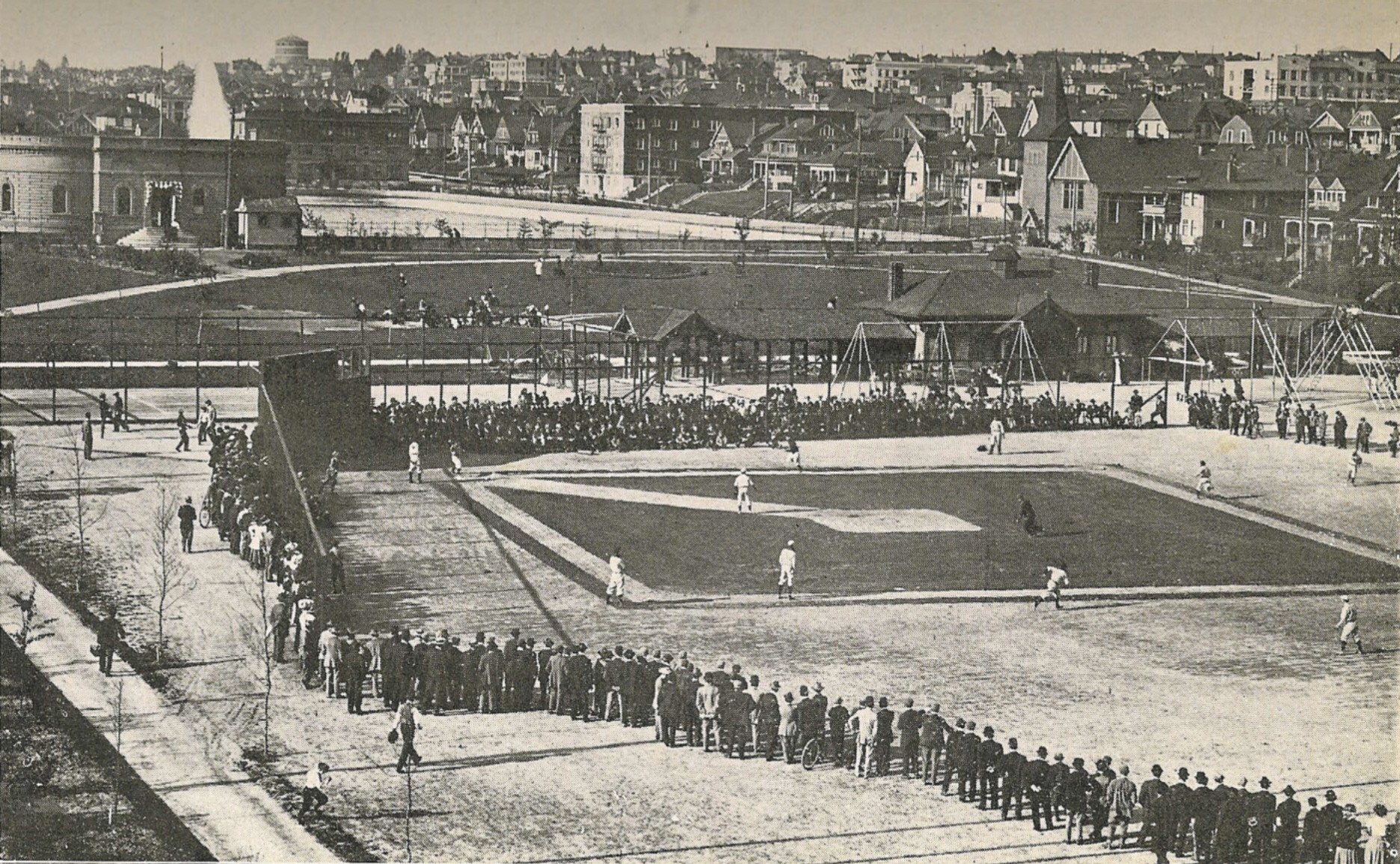
Baseball at Lincoln Park circa 1919. The open-air Lincoln Reservoir is visible in the near background. The building at left still exists today, as does the German United Church of Christ at right. The water tower on the horizon is in Volunteer Park.

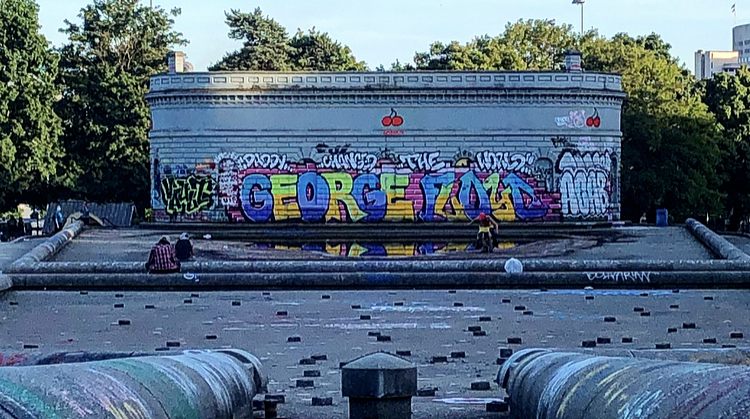
George Floyd memorial graffiti at Lincoln Reservoir in Cal Anderson Park on June 25, 2020, during CHAZ/CHOP occupation of the park and surrounding area

Lincoln Reservoir was begun in 1889 in response to the Great Seattle Fire of the same year and was completed in 1901. A parcel just south of it was named Lincoln Park the same year. The famed Olmsted Brothers designed the park as part of their many works in the Seattle area. Over time, the area underwent several name changes. In 1908 it was developed as a playfield, and in 1922 its name was changed to Broadway Playfield so as not to duplicate the name of the new Lincoln Park in West Seattle. The playfield was named after Bobby Morris, a former King County, Washington, auditor, in 1980. Meanwhile, the area around the reservoir came to be known as Lincoln Reservoir Park. On April 10, 2003, the entire site was officially renamed Cal Anderson Park, in honor of Cal Anderson, Washington’s first openly gay state legislator, who died of AIDS-related complications in 1995.

From 2003 to 2005, the reservoir was rebuilt as a covered basin.

Three security cameras were installed in the park in April 2008 in an effort to combat certain types of criminal activity, namely vandalism, drug dealing, and public sex.

In 2009, Forbes magazine recognized Cal Anderson Park as one of the 12 Best City Parks in the U.S.

The Seattle March for Science took place at the park on April 22, 2017.

On June 8, 2020, protesters occupied the park and declared it part of the Capitol Hill Autonomous Zone (CHAZ). The area was renamed the Capitol Hill Occupied Protest (CHOP) several days later.

On June 20, 2020, a shooting took place in the park, which served as a gathering area in the CHOP at the time. A 19-year-old man was fatally shot, and a 33-year-old man was critically injured. The incident was cited by opponents of the zone as a justification to disband it, using either the National Guard or the Seattle Police Department.

== Light rail station ==
The northwest corner of Cal Anderson Park (at the corner of East Denny Way and Nagle Place) contains an entrance to the underground Capitol Hill Station of Sound Transit's Link light rail.
